= Acids in wine =

Malic and tartaric acid are the primary acids in wine grapes.

The acids in wine are an important component in both winemaking and the finished product of wine. They are present in both grapes and wine, having direct influences on the color, balance and taste of the wine as well as the growth and vitality of yeast during fermentation and protecting the wine from bacteria. The measure of the amount of acidity in wine is known as the “titratable acidity” or “total acidity”, which refers to the test that yields the total of all acids present, while strength of acidity is measured according to pH, with most wines having a pH between 2.9 and 3.9. Generally, the lower the pH, the higher the acidity in the wine. There is no direct connection between total acidity and pH (it is possible to find wines with a high pH for wine and high acidity). In wine tasting, the term “acidity” refers to the fresh, tart and sour attributes of the wine which are evaluated in relation to how well the acidity balances out the sweetness and bitter components of the wine such as tannins. Three primary acids are found in wine grapes: tartaric, malic, and citric acids. During the course of winemaking and in the finished wines, acetic, butyric, lactic, and succinic acids can play significant roles. Most of the acids involved with wine are fixed acids with the notable exception of acetic acid, mostly found in vinegar, which is volatile and can contribute to the wine fault known as volatile acidity. Sometimes, additional acids, such as ascorbic, sorbic and sulfurous acids, are used in winemaking.

== Tartaric ==
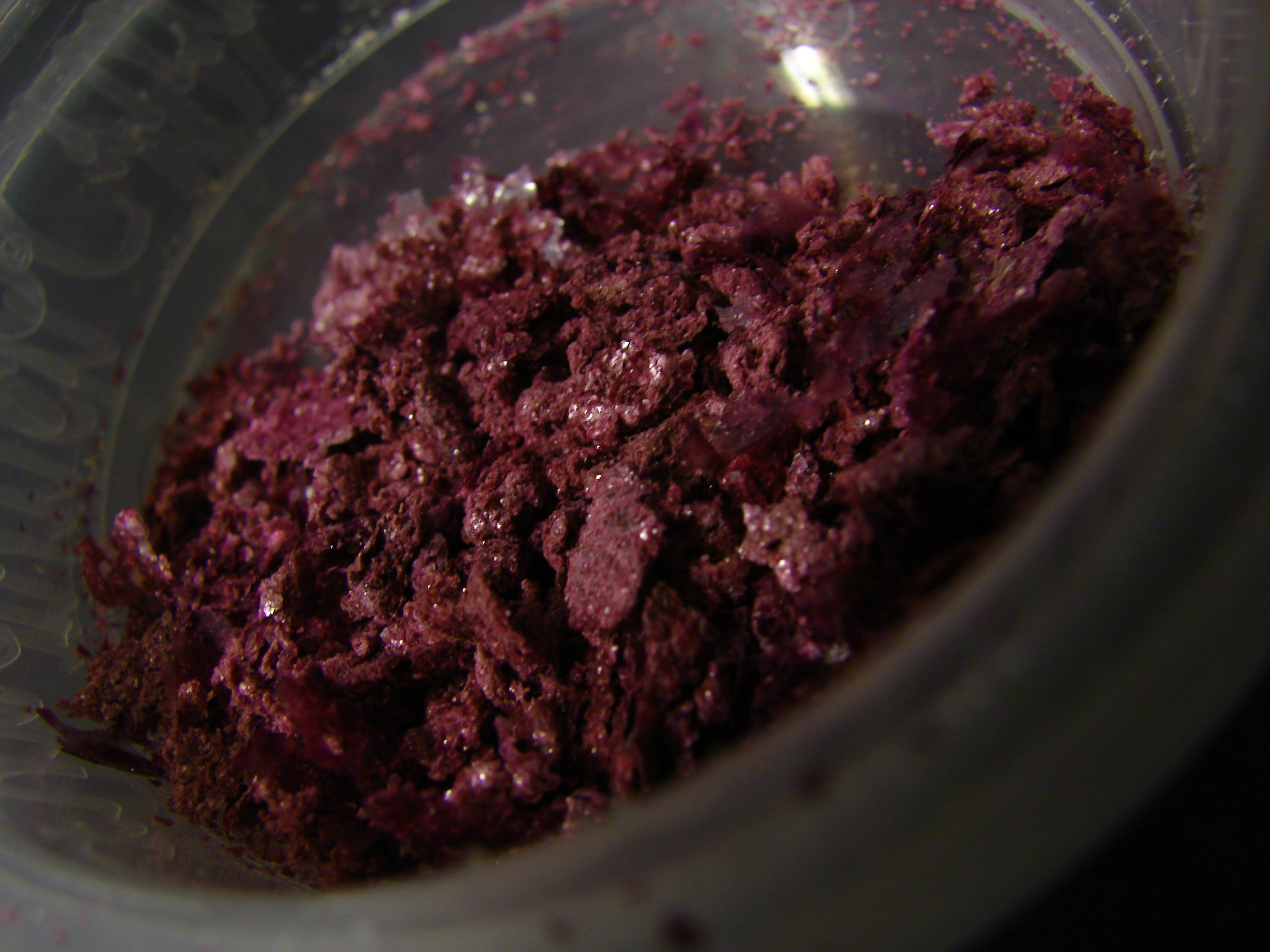
While normally clear, tartaric crystals (pictured) can be dyed the color of the wine in which it has been saturated.

Tartaric acid is, from a winemaking perspective, the most important in wine due to the prominent role it plays in maintaining the chemical stability of the wine and its color and finally in influencing the taste of the finished wine. In most plants, this organic acid is rare, but it is found in significant concentrations in grape vines. Along with malic acid, and to a lesser extent citric acid, tartaric is one of the fixed acids found in wine grapes. The concentration varies depending on grape variety and the soil content of the vineyard. Some varieties, such as Palomino, are naturally disposed to having high levels of tartaric acids, while Malbec and Pinot noir generally have lower levels. During flowering, high levels of tartaric acid are concentrated in the grape flowers and then young berries. As the vine progresses through ripening, tartaric does not get metabolized through respiration like malic acid, so the levels of tartaric acid in the grape vines remain relatively consistent throughout the ripening process.

Less than half of the tartaric acid found in grapes is free standing, with the majority of the concentration present as potassium acid salt. During fermentation, these tartrates bind with the lees, pulp debris and precipitated tannins and pigments. While some variance among grape varieties and wine regions exists, generally about half of the deposits are soluble in the alcoholic mixture of wine. The crystallization of these tartrates can happen at unpredictable times, and in a wine bottle may appear like broken glass, though they are in fact harmless. Winemakers will often put the wine through cold stabilization, where it is exposed to temperatures below freezing to encourage the tartrates to crystallize and precipitate out of the wine, or electrodialysis which removes the tartrates via a membrane process.

== Malic ==
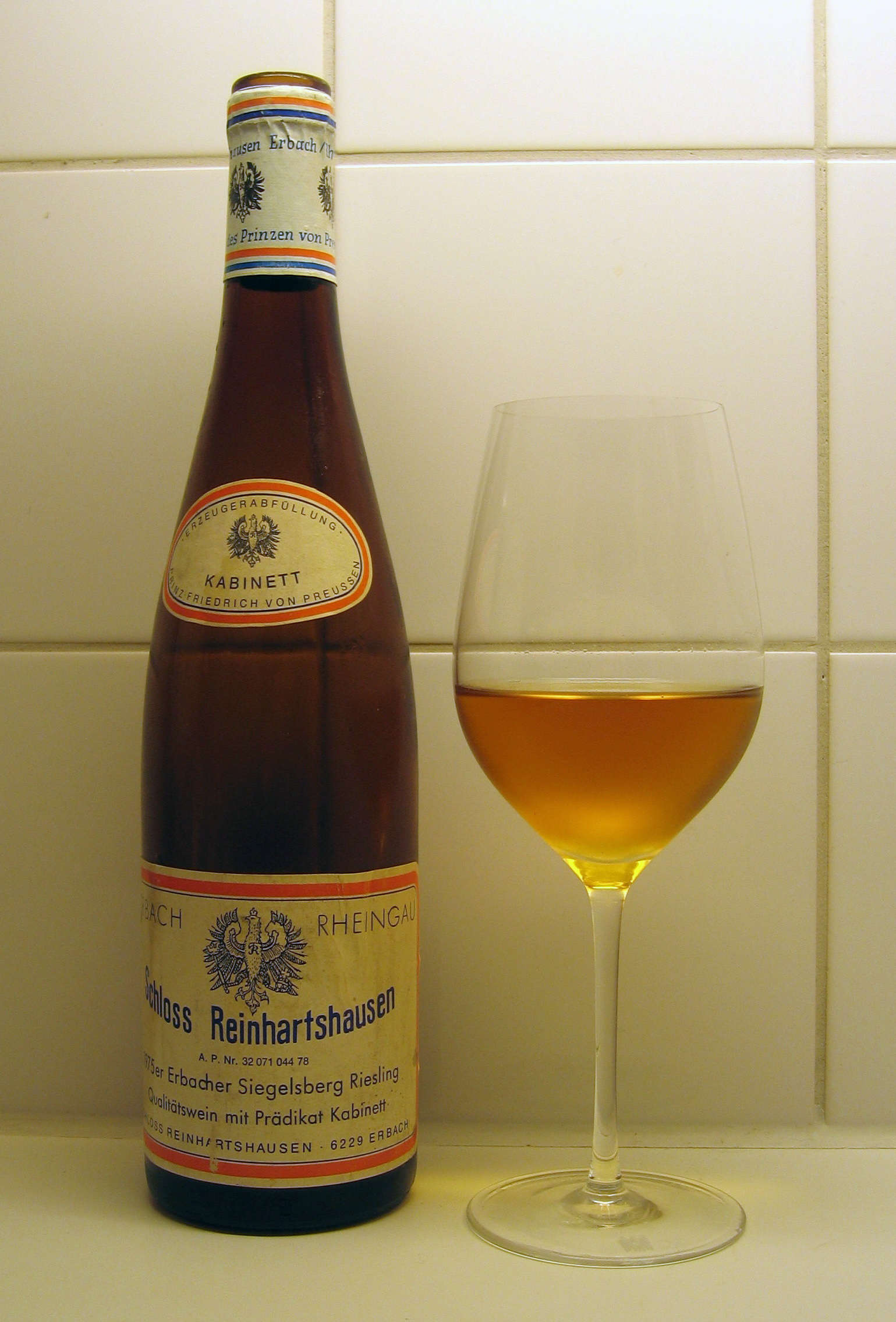
Riesling from cool climate wine regions, such as the Rheingau in Germany will have more malic acid and green apple notes than wines from warmer regions.

Malic acid, along with tartaric acid, is one of the principal organic acids found in wine grapes. It is found in nearly every fruit and berry plant, but is most often associated with green (unripe) apples, the flavor it most readily projects in wine. Its name comes from the Latin malum meaning “apple”. In the grape vine, malic acid is involved in several processes which are essential for the health and sustainability of the vine. Its chemical structure allows it to participate in enzymatic reactions that transport energy throughout the vine. Its concentration varies depending on the grape variety, with some varieties, such as Barbera, Carignan and Sylvaner, being naturally disposed to high levels. The levels of malic acid in grape berries are at their peak just before veraison, when they can be found in concentrations as high as 20 g/L. As the vine progresses through the ripening stage, malic acid is metabolized in the process of respiration, and by harvest, its concentration could be as low as 1 to 9 g/L. The respiratory loss of malic acid is more pronounced in warmer climates. When all the malic acid is used up in the grape, it is considered “over-ripe” or senescent. Winemakers must compensate for this loss by adding extraneous acid at the winery in a process known as acidification.

Malic acid can be further reduced during the winemaking process through malolactic fermentation or MLF. In this process, bacteria convert the stronger malic acid into the softer lactic acid; formally, malic acid is polyprotic (contributes multiple protons, here two), while lactic acid is monoprotic (contributes one proton), and thus has only half the effect on acidity (pH); also, the first acidity constant (pK_{a}) of malic acid (3.4 at room temperature) is lower than the (single) acidity constant of lactic acid (3.86 at room temperature), indicating stronger acidity. Thus after MLF, wine has a higher pH (less acidic), and a different mouthfeel.

The bacteria behind this process can be found naturally in the winery, in cooperages, which make oak wine barrels that will house a population of the bacteria or they can be introduced by the winemaker with a cultured specimen. For some wines, the conversion of malic into lactic acid can be beneficial, especially if the wine has excessive levels of malic acid. For other wines, such as Chenin blanc and Riesling, it produces off flavors in the wine (such as the buttery smell of diacetyl) that would not be appealing for that variety. In general, red wines are more often put through MLF than whites, which means a higher likelihood of finding malic acid in white wines (though notable exceptions, such as oaked Chardonnay, are often put through MLF).

== Lactic ==
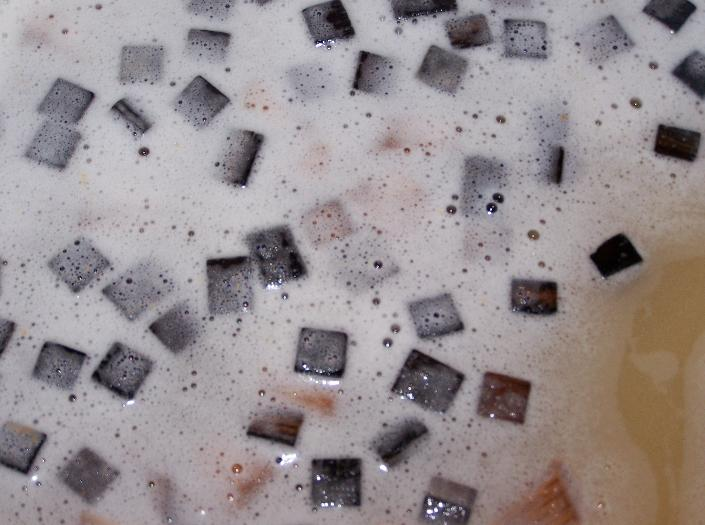
Chardonnay is often put through malolactic fermentation when it is being oaked, such as via oak chips as pictured. The softer, milky lactic acid helps contribute to a creamier mouthfeel in the wine.

A much milder acid than tartaric and malic, lactic acid is often associated with “milky” flavors in wine and is the primary acid of yogurt and sauerkraut. It is produced during winemaking by lactic acid bacteria (LAB), which includes three genera: Oenococcus, Pediococcus and Lactobacillus. These bacteria convert both sugar and malic acid into lactic acid, the latter through MLF. This process can be beneficial for some wines, adding complexity and softening the harshness of malic acidity, but it can generate off flavors and turbidity in others. Some strains of LAB can produce biogenic amines, such as histamine, tyramine and putrescine, which may be a cause of red wine headaches in some wine drinkers. Winemakers wishing to control or prevent MLF can use sulfur dioxide to stun the bacteria. Racking the wine quickly off its lees will also help control the bacteria, since lees are a vital food source for them. The winemakers must also be very careful of what wine barrels and winemaking equipment to which the wine is exposed, because of the bacteria's ability to deeply embed themselves within wood fibers. A wine barrel that has completed one successful malolactic fermentation will almost always induce MLF in every wine stored in it from then on.

== Citric ==
While very common in citrus fruits, such as limes, citric acid is found only in very minute quantities in wine grapes. It often has a concentration about 1/20 that of tartaric acid. The citric acid most commonly found in wine is commercially produced acid supplements derived from fermenting sucrose solutions. These inexpensive supplements can be used by winemakers in acidification to boost the wine's total acidity. It is used less frequently than tartaric and malic due to the aggressive citric flavors it can add to the wine. When citric acid is added, it is always done after primary alcohol fermentation has been completed due to the tendency of yeast to convert citric into acetic acid. In the European Union, use of citric acid for acidification is prohibited, but limited use of citric acid is permitted for removing excess iron and copper from the wine if potassium ferrocyanide is not available.

== Acetic ==
Acetic acid is a two-carbon organic acid produced in wine during or after the fermentation period. It is the most volatile of the primary acids associated with wine and is responsible for the sour taste of vinegar. During fermentation, activity by yeast cells naturally produces a small amount of acetic acid. If the wine is exposed to oxygen, Acetobacter bacteria will convert the ethanol into acetic acid. This process is known as the “acetification” of wine and is the primary process behind wine degradation into vinegar. An excessive amount of acetic acid is also considered a wine fault. A taster's sensitivity to acetic acid will vary, but most people can detect excessive amounts at around 600 mg/L.

== Ascorbic ==
Ascorbic acid, also known as vitamin C, is found in young wine grapes prior to veraison, but is rapidly lost throughout the ripening process. In winemaking, it is used with sulfur dioxide as an antioxidant, often added during the bottling process for white wines. In the European Union, use of ascorbic acid as an additive is limited to 150 mg/L.

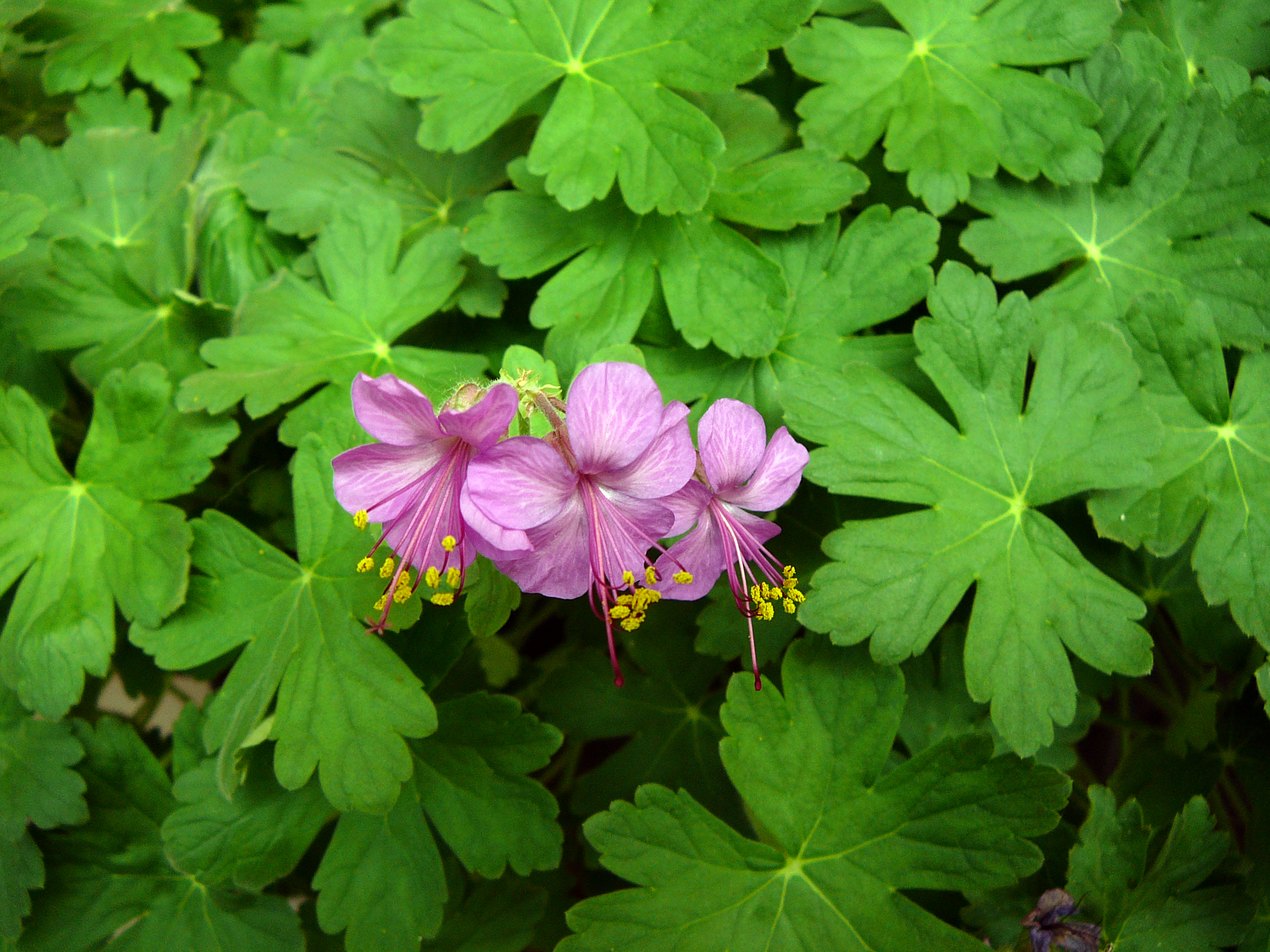
The smell of crushed Pelargonium geranium leaves is a sign that a wine has a wine fault derived from sorbic acid.

== Butyric ==
Butyric acid is a bacteria-induced wine fault that can cause a wine to smell of spoiled Camembert or rancid butter.

== Sorbic ==
Sorbic acid is a winemaking additive used often in sweet wines as a preservative against fungi, bacteria and yeast growth. Unlike sulfur dioxide, it does not hinder the growth of the lactic acid bacteria. In the European Union, the amount of sorbic acid that can be added is limited — no more than 200 mg/L. Most humans have a detection threshold of 135 mg/L, with some having a sensitivity to detect its presence at 50 mg/L. Sorbic acid can produce off flavors and aromas which can be described as “rancid”. When lactic acid bacteria metabolize sorbates in the wine, it creates a wine fault that is most recognizable by an aroma of crushed Pelargonium geranium leaves.

== Succinic ==
Succinic acid is most commonly found in wine, but can also be present in trace amounts in ripened grapes. While concentration varies among grape varieties, it is usually found in higher levels with red wine grapes. The acid is created as a byproduct of the metabolization of nitrogen by yeast cells during fermentation. The combination of succinic acid with one molecule of ethanol will create the ester ethyl succinate which contributes to a mild fruity aroma in wines.

== Effects ==
=== Making ===
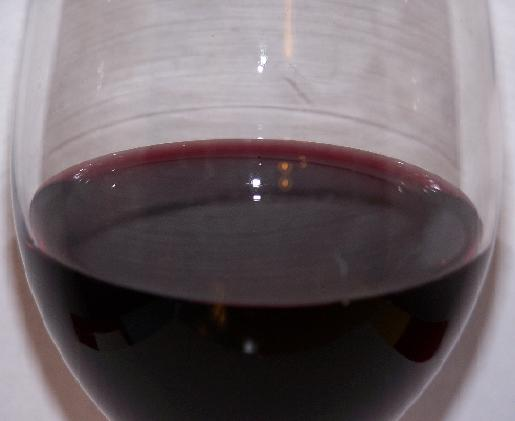
A wine with high pH and low acidity like Carménère (pictured) will have more bluish color notes than a wine with high acidity.

Acidity is highest in wine grapes just before the start of veraison, which ushers in the ripening period of the annual cycle of grape vines. As the grapes ripen, their sugar levels increase and their acidity levels decrease. Through the process of respiration, malic acid is metabolized by the grape vine. Grapes from cooler climate wine regions generally have higher levels of acidity due to the slower ripening process. The level of acidity still present in the grape is an important consideration for winemakers in deciding when to begin harvest. For wines such as Champagne and other sparkling wines, having high levels of acidity is even more vital to the winemaking process, so grapes are often picked under-ripe and at higher acid levels.

In the winemaking process, acids aid in enhancing the effectiveness of sulfur dioxide to protect the wines from spoilage and can also protect the wine from bacteria due to the inability of most bacteria to survive in low pH solutions. Two notable exceptions to this are Acetobacter and the lactic acid bacteria. In red wines, acidity helps preserve and stabilize the color of the wine. The ionization of anthocyanins is affected by pH, so wines with lower pH (such as Sangiovese-based wines) have redder, more stable colors. Wines with higher pH (such as Syrah-based wines) have higher levels of less stable blue pigments, eventually taking on a muddy grey hue. These wines can also develop a brownish tinge. In white wines, higher pH (lower acidity) causes the phenolics in the wine to darken and eventually polymerize as brown deposits.

Winemakers will sometimes add acids to the wine (acidification) to make the wine more acidic, most commonly in warm climate regions where grapes are often harvested at advanced stages of ripeness with high levels of sugars, but very low levels of acid. Tartaric acid is most often added, but winemakers will sometimes add citric or malic acid. Acids can be added either before or after primary fermentation. They can be added during blending or aging, but the increased acidity will become more noticeable to wine tasters if added at this point.

=== Tasting ===
The acidity in wine is an important component in the quality and taste of the wine. It adds a sharpness to the flavors and is detected most readily by a prickling sensation on the sides of the tongue and a mouth-watering aftertaste. Of particular importance is the balance of acidity versus the sweetness of the wine (the leftover residual sugar) and the more bitter components of the wine (most notably tannins but also includes other phenolics). A wine with too much acidity will taste excessively sour and sharp. A wine with too little acidity will taste flabby and flat, with less defined flavors.

== See also ==
- Wine chemistry
