= Tinto de Barrantes =

Galician wine variety

Tinto de Barrantes is a Galician red wine from the municipality Ribadumia, more specifically the village of Barrantes.

It is made from grapes of hybrid vines, locally referred to as Folla Redonda, which are cultivated in Barrantes. Despite efforts to change its legal status, Folla Redonda has not yet been granted the classification as legally regulated wine grape ("variedad viticola") by Spanish authorities. The Folla Redonda vines in Ribadumia were planted in the late 19th century and early 20th century in the wake of the catastrophic destruction caused by the phylloxera beetle.

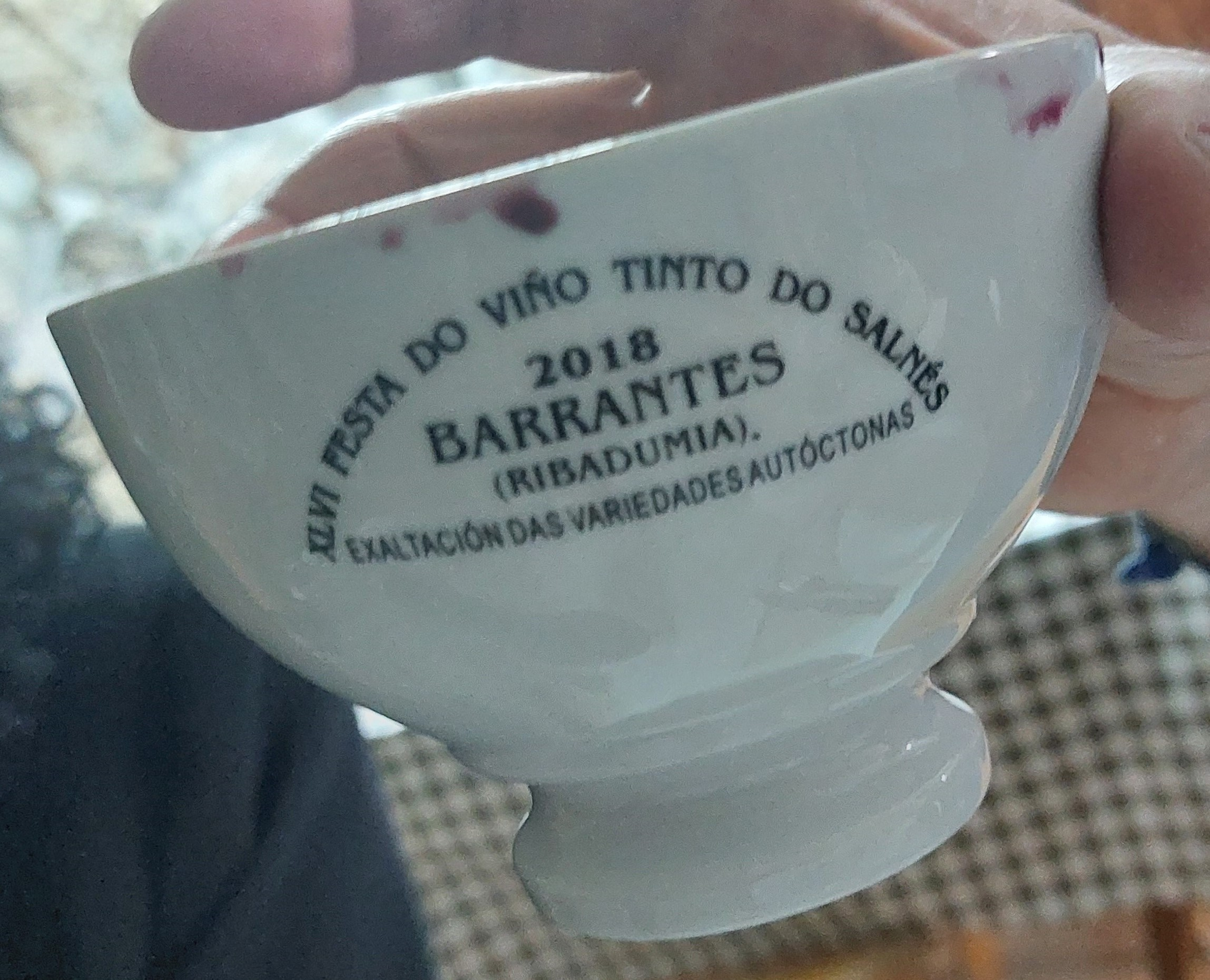
Cunca cup typically used for the consumption of Tinto de Barrantes

Tinto de Barrantes is of a deep violet tinged, blackcurrant red colour. Its intense red colour is emphasised by the white ceramic cup (cunca) it is typically served in. It is rather low in alcohol (below 10%) and also low in sugar with a high level of acidity.

Tinto de Barrantes has not gone through a malolactic conversion at the usual time of its serving. The malolactic conversion would take place in the bottle if Tinto de Barrantes would be stored for an extended period of time after bottling, making it unsuitable for storage or longer periods of transportation. It is hence rarely encountered outside of Galicia.

Every May, Tinto de Barrantes is celebrated during the “Festa do Viño Tinto do Salnés de Barrantes” in Ribadumia.
