= Sørensen formol titration =

Titration of amino acid

The Sørensen formol titration(SFT) invented by S. P. L. Sørensen in 1907 is a largely archaic method that was once used to determine the amino acid content of a sample. It is used in the determination of protein content in samples.

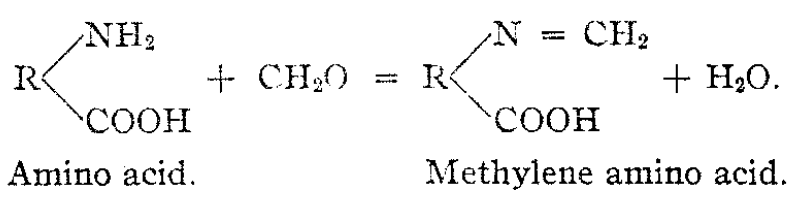
A historic and archaic representation of the Formol titration.

In case of tyrosine, the actual results are too high due to the negative hydroxyl group (-OH), which acts as a base. This explanation is supported by the fact that phenylalanine can be accurately titrated.

== Method ==
The titration of an amino acid with potassium hydroxide in the presence of formaldehyde.

== In winemaking ==
Formol titration is used in winemaking to measure yeast assimilable nitrogen needed by wine yeast in order to complete fermentation. A related analysis method is o-phthaldialdehyde/N-acetyl-L-cysteine spectrophotometric assay (NOPA).
