= Volatile acid =

Type of acid

In chemistry, the terms volatile acid (or volatile fatty acid (VFA)) and volatile acidity (VA) are used somewhat differently in various application areas.

== Wine ==
In wine chemistry, the volatile acids are those that can be separated from wine through steam distillation. Many factors influence the level of VA, but the growth of spoilage bacteria and yeasts are the primary source and consequently VA is often used to quantify the degree of wine oxidation and spoilage.

Acetic acid is the primary volatile acid in wine, but smaller amounts of lactic, formic, butyric, propionic acid, carbonic acid (from carbon dioxide), and sulfurous acid (from sulfur dioxide) may be present and contribute to VA; in analysis, measures may be taken to exclude or correct for the VA due to carbonic, sulfuric, and sorbic acids. Other acids present in wine, including malic and tartaric acid are considered non-volatile or fixed acids. Together volatile and non-volatile acidity compromise total acidity.

Classical analysis for VA involves distillation in a Cash or Markham still, followed by titration with standardized sodium hydroxide, and reporting of the results as acetic acid. Several alternatives to the classical analysis have been developed.

While VA is typically considered a wine flaw or fault, winemakers may intentionally allow a small amount of VA in their product for its contribution to the wine's sensory complexity. Excess VA is difficult for winemakers to correct. In some countries, including the United States, European Union, and Australia, the law sets a limit on the level of allowable VA.

== Wastewater ==
In wastewater treatment, the volatile acids are the short chain fatty acids (1-6 carbon atoms) that are water-soluble and can be steam distilled at atmospheric pressure - primarily acetic, proprionic, and butyric acid. These acids are produced during anaerobic digestion. In a well functioning digester, the volatile acids will be consumed by the methane forming bacteria. Volatile acid/alkalinity ratio is often measured as one indicator of a digester's condition. The acceptable level of volatile fatty acids in environmental waters is up to 50,000 ppm.

Volatile fatty acids can be analyzed by titration, distillation, steam distillation, or chromatography. Titration provides approximate but relatively quick results; it is widely used by wastewater treatment plants to track a status of a digestor. Distillation similarly is used in wastewater treatment plants and produces approximate results; 15-32% of the VFAs are lost during distillation. Steam distillation can recover 92-98% of a samples VFA. This method is more precise than previous two methods, but requires about 4 hours to complete. Chromatography gives the most precise and accurate results. It is capable of qualitatively and quantitatively analyzing each individual VFA.

== Physiology ==
In physiology, volatile acid (or respiratory acid) refers to carbonic acid, a product of dissolved carbon dioxide. In this context, volatile indicates that it can be expelled as a gas through the lungs. Carbonic acid is the only physiologically volatile acid; all other acids are physiologically nonvolatile acids (also known as a fixed or metabolic acids). Volatile acid results from the aerobic oxidation of substances such as carbohydrates and fatty acids.

== Butter ==
Volatile acid concentration can be used to detect adulteration of butter with less expensive fats. Butterfat has uncommonly high levels of volatile butyric and caproic acids, and mixing with fats from other sources dilutes the volatile acids. A measurement of the volatile acids is known as the Reichert Meissel value.

== Nutrition and digestion ==
In digestion, volatile acids or volatile fatty acids are short chain fatty acids. They are especially important in the digestion of ruminant animals, where they result from the action of rumen flora, and are absorbed as an energy source by the animal.

== Industrial hygiene ==
In workplace air samples, concentrations of hydrochloric, hydrobromic, and nitric acid may be monitored as hazardous volatile acids.

== See also ==
- Acids in wine
