= Malolactic fermentation =

Process in winemaking

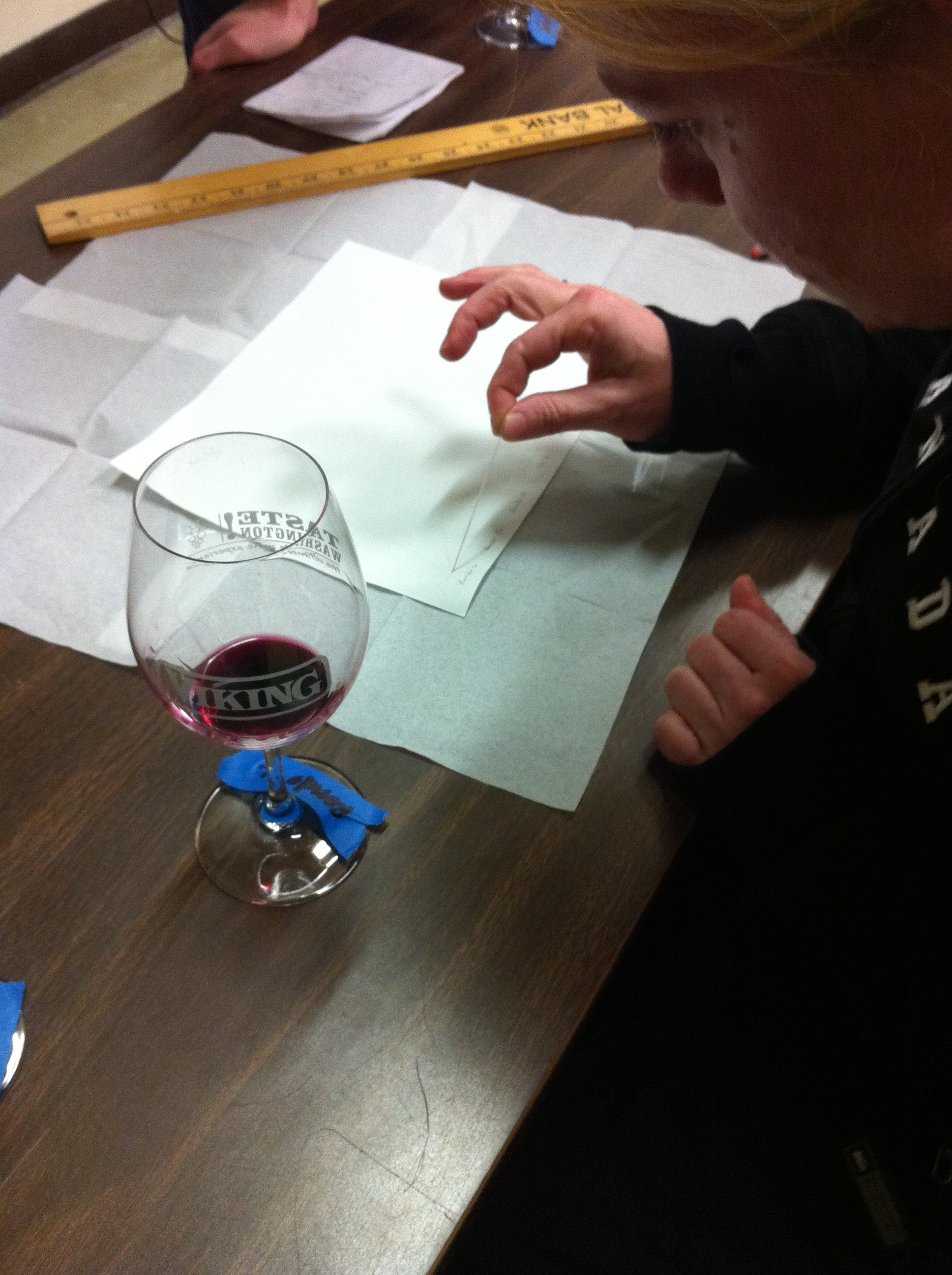
A winemaker running a paper chromatography test to determine whether a wine has completed malolactic fermentation

Malolactic conversion (also known as malolactic fermentation or MLF) is a process in winemaking in which tart-tasting malic acid, naturally present in grape must, is converted to softer-tasting lactic acid. Malolactic fermentation is most often performed as a secondary fermentation shortly after the end of the primary fermentation, but can sometimes run concurrently with it. The process is standard for most red wine production and common for some white grape varieties such as Chardonnay, where it can impart a "buttery" flavor from diacetyl, a byproduct of the reaction.

The fermentation reaction is undertaken by the family of lactic acid bacteria (LAB); Oenococcus oeni, and various species of Lactobacillus and Pediococcus. Chemically, malolactic fermentation is a decarboxylation, which means carbon dioxide is liberated in the process.

The primary function of all these bacteria is to convert L-malic acid, one of the two major grape acids found in wine, to another type of acid, L+ lactic acid. This can occur naturally. However, in commercial winemaking, malolactic conversion typically is initiated by an inoculation of desirable bacteria, usually O. oeni. This prevents undesirable bacterial strains from producing "off" flavors. Conversely, commercial winemakers actively prevent malolactic conversion when it is not desired, such as with fruity and floral white grape varieties such as Riesling and Gewürztraminer, to maintain a more tart or acidic profile in the finished wine.

Malolactic fermentation tends to create a rounder, fuller mouthfeel. Malic acid is typically associated with the taste of green apples, while lactic acid is richer and more buttery tasting. Grapes produced in cool regions tend to be high in acidity, much of which comes from the contribution of malic acid. Malolactic fermentation generally enhances the body and flavor persistence of wine, producing wines of greater palate softness. Many winemakers also feel that better integration of fruit and oak character can be achieved if malolactic fermentation occurs during the time the wine is in barrel.

A wine undergoing malolactic conversion will be cloudy because of the presence of bacteria, and may have the smell of buttered popcorn, the result of the production of diacetyl. The onset of malolactic fermentation in the bottle is usually considered a wine fault, as the wine will appear to the consumer to still be fermenting (as a result of CO_{2} being produced). However, for early Vinho Verde production, this slight effervesce was considered a distinguishing trait, though Portuguese wine producers had to market the wine in opaque bottles because of the increase in turbidity and sediment that the "in-bottle MLF" produced. Today, most Vinho Verde producers no longer follow this practice and instead complete malolactic fermentation prior to bottling with the slight sparkle being added by artificial carbonation.

== History ==
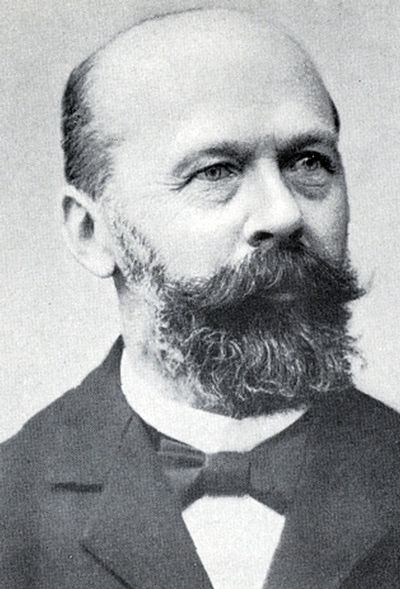
The Swiss enologist Hermann Müller was one of the first scientists to theorize that bacteria were a potential cause of acid reduction in wine.

Malolactic fermentation is possibly as old as the history of wine, but scientific understanding of the positive benefits of MLF and control of the process is a relatively recent development. For many centuries, winemakers noticed an "activity" that would happen in their wines stored in barrel during the warm spring months following harvest. Like primary alcoholic fermentation, this phenomenon would release carbon dioxide gas and seem to have a profound change on the wine that was not always welcomed. It was described as a "second fermentation" in 1837 by the German enologist Freiherr von Babo and the cause for increased turbidity in the wine. Von Babo encouraged winemakers to quickly respond at the first sight of this activity by racking the wine into a new barrel, adding sulfur dioxide, and then following up with another set of racking and sulfuring to stabilize the wine.

In 1866, Louis Pasteur, one of the pioneers of modern microbiology, isolated the first bacteria from wine and determined that all bacteria in wine were a cause for wine spoilage. While Pasteur did notice an acid reduction in wine with the lactic bacteria, he did not link that process to a consumption of malic acid by the bacteria, but rather assumed it was just tartrate precipitation. In 1891, the Swiss enologist Hermann Müller theorized that bacteria may be the cause of this reduction. With the aid of peers, Müller explained his theory of "biological deacidication" in 1913 to be caused by wine bacterium Bacterium gracile.

In the 1930s, the French enologist Jean Ribéreau-Gayon published papers stating the benefits of this bacterial transformation in wine. During the 1950s, advances in enzymatic analysis allowed enologists to better understand the chemical processes behind malolactic fermentation. Émile Peynaud furthered enology understanding of the process and soon cultured stock of beneficial lactic acid bacteria was available for winemakers to use.

== Role in winemaking ==
The primary role of malolactic fermentation is to deacidify wine. It can also affect the sensory aspects of a wine, making the mouthfeel seem smoother and adding potential complexity in the flavor and aroma of the wine. For these other reasons, most red wines throughout the world (as well as many sparkling wines and nearly 20% of the world's white wines) today go through malolactic fermentation.

Malolactic fermentation deacidifies the wine by converting the "harsher" diprotic malic acid to the softer monoprotic lactic acid. The different structures of malic and lactic acids leads to a reduction of titratable acidity (TA) in the wine by 1 to 3 g/L and an increase in pH by 0.3 units. Malic acid is present in the grape throughout the growing season, reaching its peak at veraison and gradually decreasing throughout the ripening process. Grapes harvested from cooler climates usually have the highest malic content and have the most dramatic changes in TA and pH levels after malolactic fermentation.

The chemical process of malolactic fermentation is actually a decarboxylation instead of a fermentation. The bacterial cell takes in malate, converts it into lactate, and releases carbon dioxide in the process. The lactate is then expelled by the cell into the wine.

Malolactic fermentation can aid in making a wine "microbiologically stable" in that the lactic acid bacteria consume many of the leftover nutrients that other spoilage microbes could use to develop wine faults. However, it can also make the wine slightly "unstable" due to the rise in pH, especially if the wine already was at the high end of wine pH. It is not unusual for wines to be "deacidified" by malolactic fermentation only to have the winemaker later add acidity (usually in the form of tartaric acid) to lower the pH to more stable levels.

=== Conversion of malic into lactic ===
Lactic acid bacteria convert malic acid into lactic acid as an indirect means of creating energy for the bacteria by chemiosmosis which uses the difference in pH gradient between inside the cell and outside in the wine to produce ATP. One model on how this is accomplished notes that the form of L-malate most present at the low pH of wine is its negatively charged monoanionic form. When the bacteria move this anion from the wine into higher pH level of its cellular plasma membrane, it causes a net-negative charge that creates electrical potential. The decarboxylation of malate into L-lactic acid releases not only carbon dioxide but also consumes a proton, which generates the pH gradient which can produce ATP.

Lactic acid bacteria convert L-malic acid found naturally in wine grapes. Most commercial malic acid additives are a mixture of the enantiomers D+ and L-malic acid.

=== Sensory influences ===
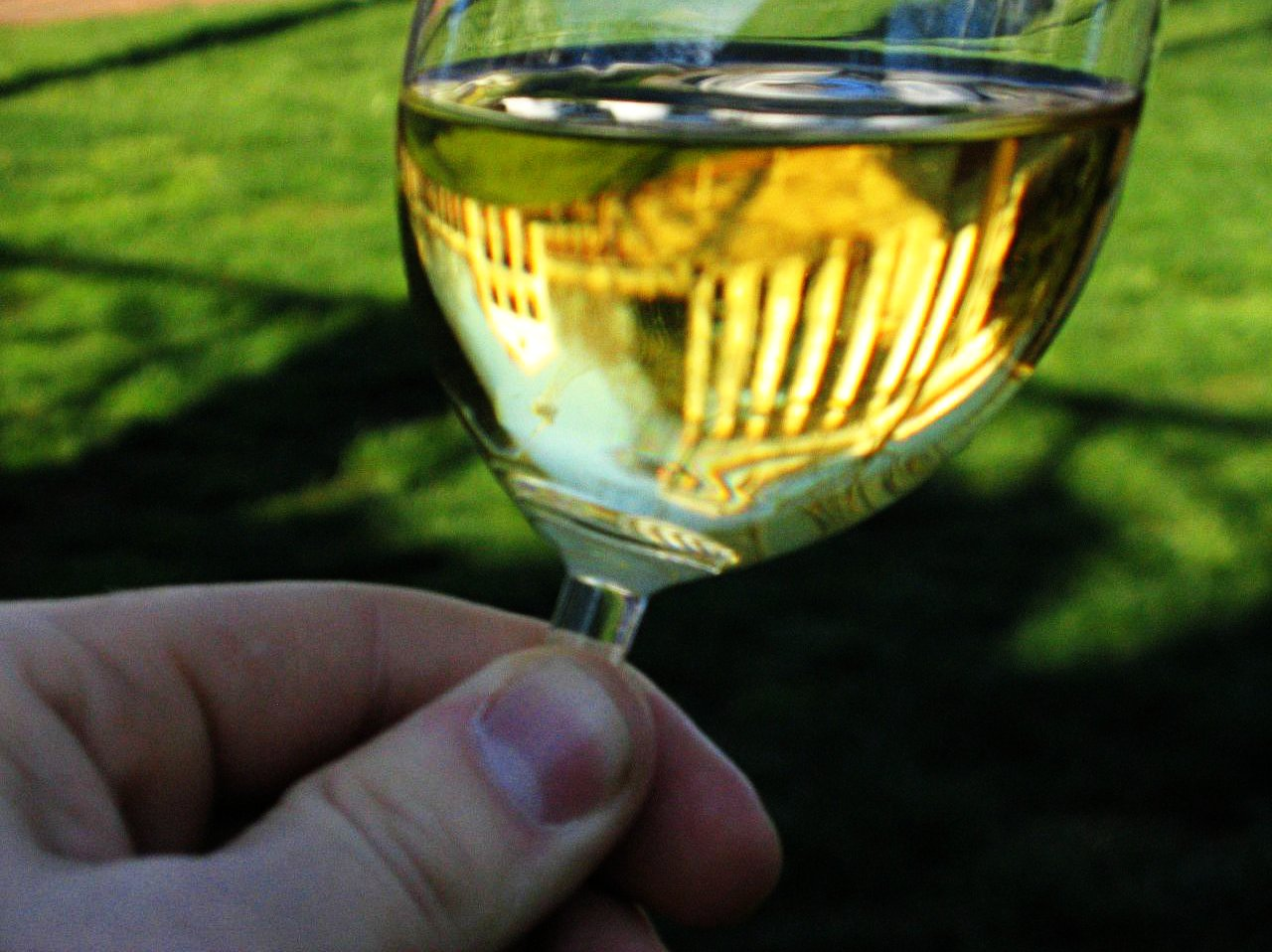
The sensory characteristic of "buttery" Chardonnay comes through the process malolactic fermentation.

Many different studies have been conducted on the sensory changes that occur in wines that have gone through malolactic fermentation. The most common descriptor is that acidity in the wine feels "softer" due to the change of the "harsher" malic acid to the softer lactic acid. The perception of sourness comes from the titratable acidity in the wine, so the reduction in TA that follows MLF leads to a reduction in perceived sour or "tartness" in the wine.

The change in mouthfeel is related to the increase in pH, but may also be due to the production of polyols, particularly the sugar alcohols erythritol and glycerol. Another factor that may enhance the mouthfeel of wines that have gone through malolactic fermentation is the presence of ethyl lactate which can be as high as 110 mg/L after MLF.

The potential influence on the aroma of the wine is more complex and difficult to predict with different strains of Oenococcus oeni (the bacterium most commonly used in MLF) having the potential to create different aroma compounds. In Chardonnay, wines that have gone through MLF are often described as having "hazelnut" and "dried fruit" notes, as well as the aroma of freshly baked bread. In red wines, some strains metabolize the amino acid methionine into a derivative of propionic acid that tends to produce roasted aroma and chocolate notes. Red wines that go through malolactic fermentation in the barrel can have enhanced spice or smoke aromas.

However, some studies have also shown that malolactic fermentation may diminish primary fruit aromas such as Pinot noir, often losing raspberry and strawberry notes after MLF. Additionally, red wines may endure a loss of color after MLF due to pH changes that causes a shift in the equilibrium of the anthocyanins which contribute to the stability of color in wine.

== Lactic acid bacteria ==
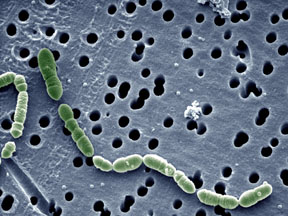
Oenococcus oeni

All lactic acid bacteria (LAB) involved in winemaking, whether as a positive contributor or as a source for potential faults, have the ability to produce lactic acid through the metabolism of a sugar source, as well as the metabolism of L-malic acid. Species differ in how they metabolise the available sugars in wine (both glucose and fructose, as well as the unfermentable pentoses that wine yeasts do not consume). Some bacteria species use the sugars through a homofermentative pathway, meaning only one main end product (usually lactate) is produced, while others use heterofermentative pathways that can create multiple end products such as carbon dioxide, ethanol, and acetate. While only the L-isomer of lactate is produced by LAB in the conversion of malic acid, both hetero- and homofermenters can produce D-, L- and DL-isomers of lactic from glucose which may contribute to slightly different sensory properties in the wine.

While O. oeni is often the LAB most desired by winemakers to complete malolactic fermentation, the process is most often carried out by a variety of LAB species that dominate the must at different points during fermentations. Several factors influence which species will be dominant, including fermentation temperature, nutritional resources, the presence of sulfur dioxide, interaction with yeast and other bacteria, pH, and alcohol levels (Lactobacillus species, for example, tend to prefer higher pH and can tolerate higher alcohol levels than O. oeni), as well as initial inoculation (such as "wild" ferments versus an inoculation of cultured O. oeni).

=== Oenococcus ===
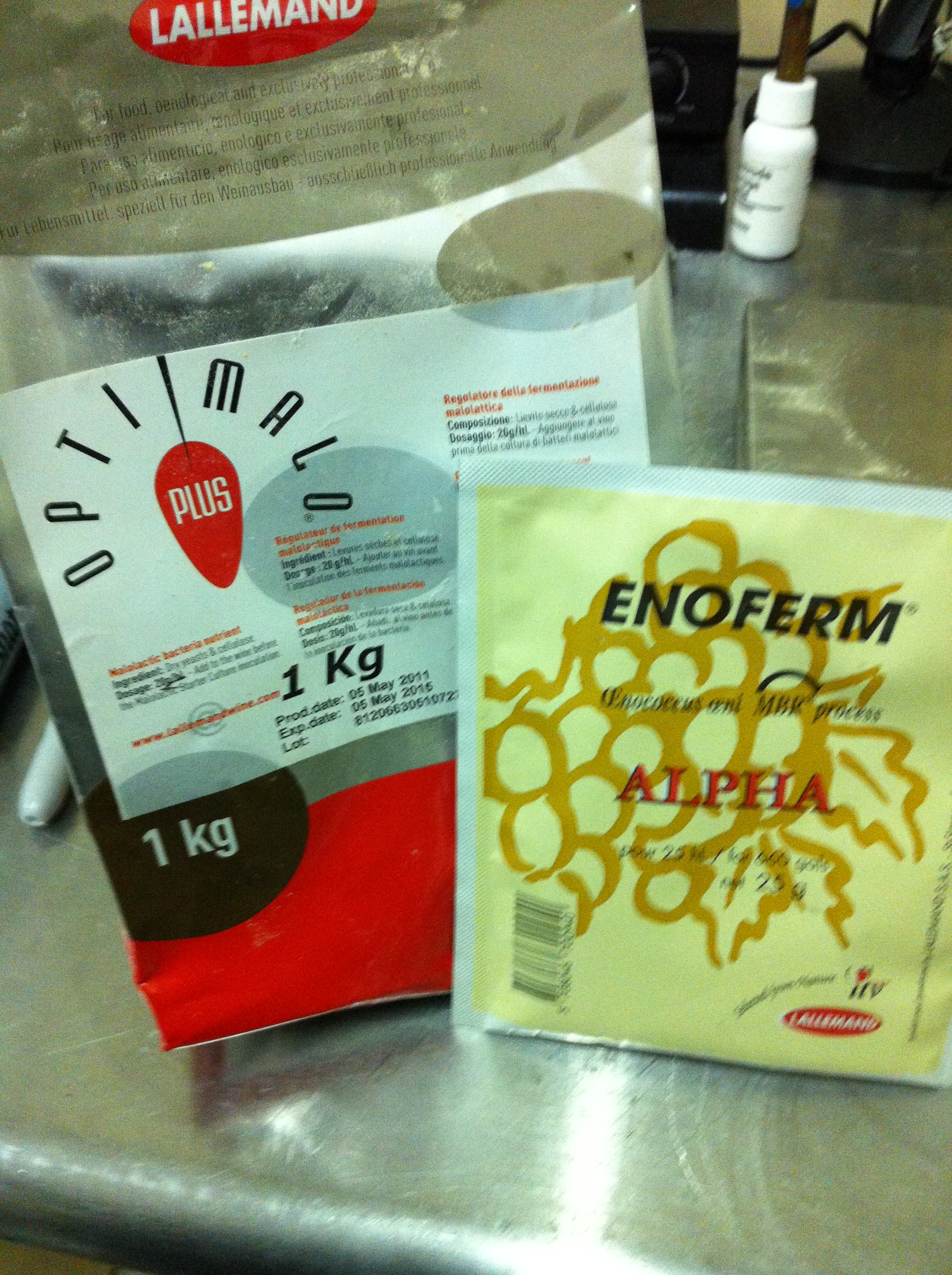
Cultured Oenococcus oeni inoculum strain and "Opti-malo" nutrient additive

The genus Oenococcus has one main member involved in winemaking, O. oeni, once known as Leuconostoc oeni. Despite having the name Oenococcus, under the microscope, the bacterium has a bacillus (shape) rod shape. The bacteria is a Gram-positive, facultative anaerobe that can utilize some oxygen for aerobic respiration but usually produces cellular energy through fermentation. O. oeni is a heterofermenter that creates multiple end products from the use of glucose with D-lactic acid and carbon dioxide being produced in roughly equal amounts to either ethanol or acetate. In reductive conditions (such as near the end of alcoholic fermentation), the third end product is usually ethanol while in slightly oxidative (such as early in alcohol fermentation or in an untopped barrel), the bacteria are more likely to produce acetate.

Some O. oeni strains can use fructose to create mannitol (which can lead to wine fault known as mannitol taint), while many other strains can break down the amino acid arginine (which can be present in the wine that is resting on the lees after fermentation from the autolysis of dead yeast cells) into ammonia.

In addition to the hexose glucose and fructose sugars, most strains of O. oeni can use the residual pentose sugars left behind from yeast fermentation including L-arabinose and ribose. Only around 45% of O. oeni strains can ferment sucrose (the form of sugar usually added for chaptalization that gets converted by yeast into glucose and fructose).

Winemakers tend to prefer O. oeni for several reasons. First, the species is compatible with the main wine yeast Saccharomyces cerevisiae, though in cases where both MLF and alcoholic fermentation are started together, the yeast most often outcompetes the bacterium for nutritional resources which may cause a delay in the onset of malolactic fermentation. Second, most strains of O. oeni are tolerant to the low pH levels of wine and can usually deal with the standard alcohol levels that most wines reach by the end of fermentation. Additionally, while sulfur dioxide levels above 0.8 molecular SO_{2} (pH dependent but roughly 35-50 ppm) will inhibit the bacteria, O. oeni is relatively resistant compared to other LAB. Finally, O. oeni tends to produce the least amount of biogenic amines (and most lactic acid) among the lactic acid bacteria encountered in winemaking.

=== Lactobacillus ===
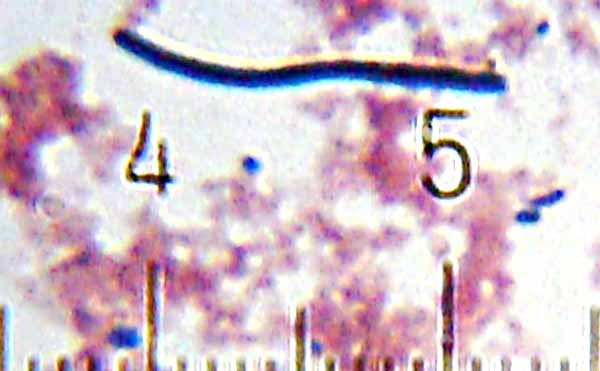
Lactobacillus from a yogurt sample.

Within the genus Lactobacillus are both heterofermentative and homofermentative species. All lactobacilli involved in winemaking are Gram-positive and microaerophilic, with most species lacking the enzyme catalase needed to protect themselves from oxidative stress.

Species of Lactobacillus that have been isolated from wine and grape must samples across the globe include L. brevis, L. buchneri, L. casei, L. curvatus, L. delbrueckii subsp. lactis, L. diolivorans, L. fermentum, L. fructivorans, L. hilgardii, L. jensenii, L. kunkeei, L. leichmannii, L. nagelii, L. paracasei, L. plantarum, and L. yamanashiensis.

Most Lactobacillus species are undesirable in winemaking with the potential of producing high levels of volatile acidity, off odors, wine haze, gassiness, and sediment that can be deposited in the bottle, especially if the wine had not been filtered. These bacteria also have the potential to create excessive amounts of lactic acid which can further influence the flavor and sensory perception of the wine. Some species, such as the so-called "ferocious Lactobacillus", have been implicated in causing sluggish or stuck fermentations, while other species, such as L. fructivorans, have been known to create a cottony mycelium-like growth on the surface of wines, nicknamed "Fresno mold" after the wine region where it was discovered.

=== Pediococcus ===
Acrolein taint is a common wine fault that undesirable species of Pediococcus can introduce to wine. Acrolein can interact with various phenolic compounds, imparting a bitter taste to the wine.

So far, four species from the genus Pediococcus have been isolated in wines and grape must, P. inopinatus, P. pentosaceus, P. parvulus, and P. damnosus, with the last two being the species most commonly found in wine. All Pediococcus species are Gram-positive with some species being micro-aerophilic while others utilizing mostly aerobic respiration. Under the microscope, Pediococcus often appear in pairs of pairs or tetrads which can make them identifiable. Pediococci are homofermenters, metabolizing glucose into a racemic mixture of both L- and D-lactate by glycolysis. However, in the absence of glucose, some species, such as P. pentosaceus, begin using glycerol, degrading it into pyruvate which later can be converted to diacetyl, acetate, 2,3-butanediol and other compounds that can impart unfavorable characteristics to the wine.

Most Pediococcus species are undesirable in winemaking due to the high levels of diacetyl that can be produced, as well as increased production of biogenic amines that has been implicated as one potential cause for red wine headaches. Many species of Pediococcus also have the potential to introduce off odors or other wine faults to the wine such as the bitter-tasting "acrolein taint" that comes from degradation of glycerol into acrolein which then reacts with phenolic compounds in the wine to produce a bitter-tasting compound.

One species, P. parvulus, has been found in wines that have not gone through MLF (meaning malic acid is still present in the wine), but has still had its bouquet altered in a way that enologist have described as "not spoiled" or flaw. Other studies have isolated P. parvulus from wines that have gone through malolactic fermentation without the development of off odors or wine faults.

=== Nutritional requirements ===
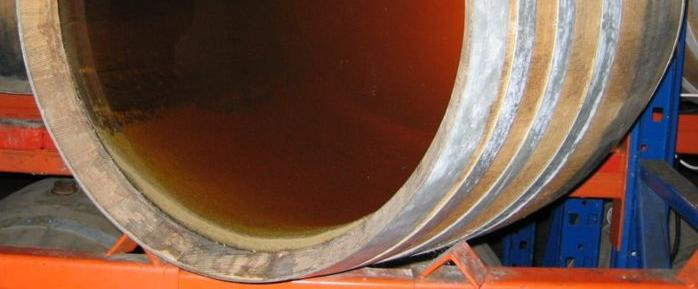
When yeast cells die, they sink to the bottom of the tank or barrel, creating the "lees" sediment visible in this picture. The autolysis of the dead yeast cells is a source of a nutrients for lactic acid bacteria.

Lactic acid bacteria are fastidious organisms that cannot synthesize on their own all of their complex nutritional requirements. For LAB to grow and complete malolactic fermentation, the constitution of the wine medium must provide for their nutritional needs. Like wine yeast, LAB require a carbon source for energy metabolism (usually sugar and malic acid), nitrogen source (such as amino acids and purines) for protein synthesis, and various vitamins (such as niacin, riboflavin, and thiamine) and minerals to assist in the synthesis of enzymes and other cellular components.

The source for these nutrients is often found in the grape must itself, though MLF inoculations that run concurrent with alcoholic fermentation risk the yeast outcompeting the bacteria for these nutrients. Towards the end of fermentation, while most of the original grape must resources have been consumed, the lysis of dead yeast cells (the "lees") can be a source for some nutrients, particularly amino acids. Plus, even "dry" wines that have been fermented to dryness still have unfermentable pentose sugars (such as arabinose, ribose and xylose) left behind that can be used by both positive and spoilage bacteria. As with wine yeast, manufacturers of cultured LAB inoculum usually offer specially prepared nutritional additives that be used as a supplement. However, unlike wine yeast, lactic acid bacteria can not use the supplement diammonium phosphate as a nitrogen source.

Before the introduction of complex nutritional supplements and advances in freeze-dried cultures of LAB, winemakers would cultivate their inoculum of lactic acid bacteria from culture slants provided by laboratories. In the 1960s, these winemakers found it easier to create starter cultures in media that contained apple or tomato juice. This "tomato juice factor" was discovered to be a derivative of pantothenic acid, an important growth factor for the bacteria.

As with yeast, oxygen can be considered a nutrient for LAB, but only in very small amount and only for microaerophilic species such as O. oeni. However, no evidence exists currently to suggest that malolactic fermentation runs more smoothly in aerobic conditions than in complete anaerobic conditions, and in fact, excessive amounts of oxygen can retard growth of LAB by favoring conditions of competing microbes (such as Acetobacter).

=== Native LAB species in the vineyard and the winery ===
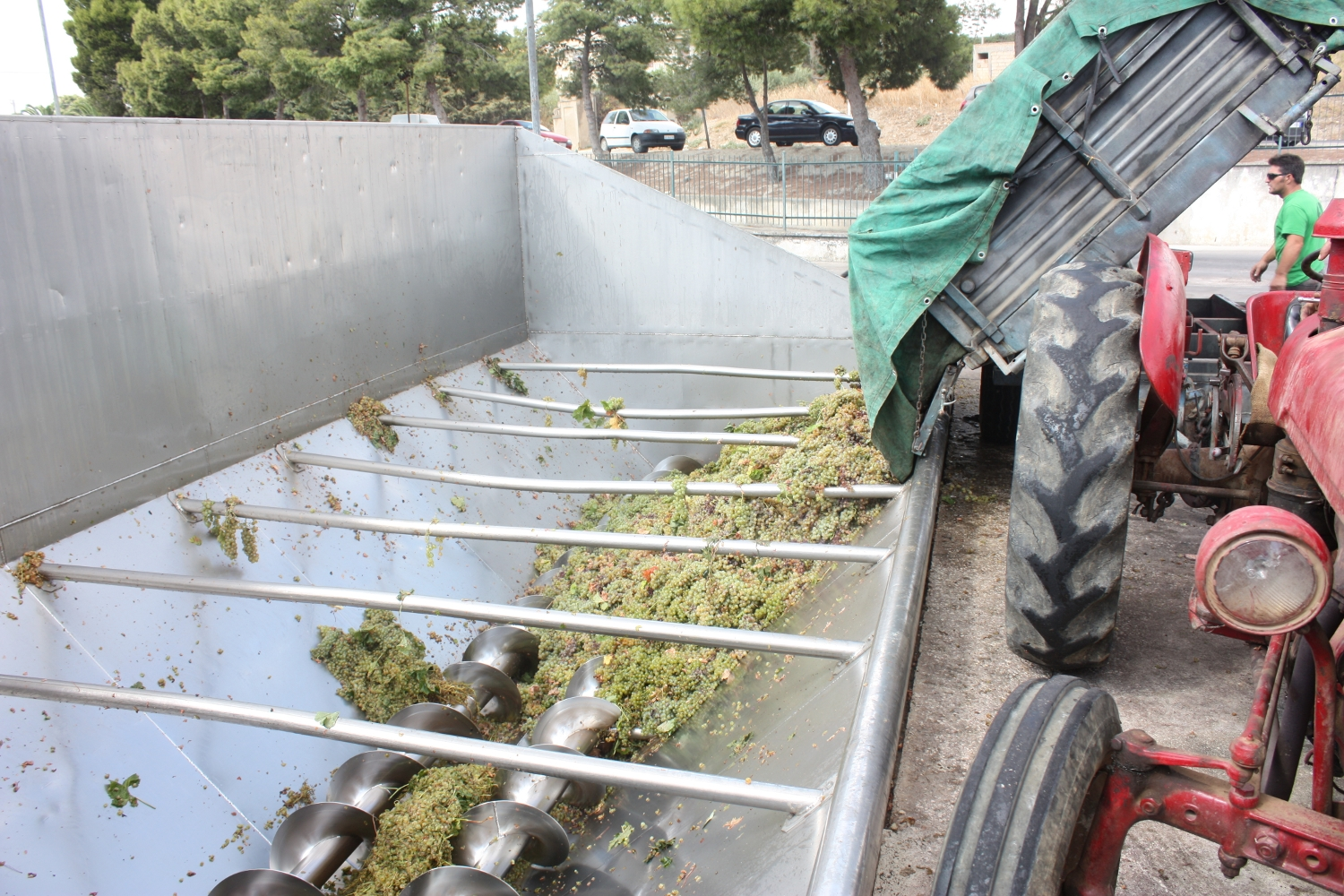
Winery equipment offers multiple contact points for native populations of lactic acid bacteria to be introduced to the wine.

Oenococcus oeni, the LAB species most often desired by winemakers to carry out malolactic fermentation, can be found in the vineyard, but often at very low levels. While moldy, damaged fruit has the potential to carry a diverse flora of microbes, the LAB most often found on clean, healthy grapes after harvest are species from the Lactobacillus and Pediococcus genera. After crushing, microbiologists usually find populations under 10^{3} colony forming units/mL containing a mix of P. damnosus, L. casei, L. hilgardii, and L. plantarum, as well as O. oeni. For musts that do not receive an early dose of sulfur dioxide to "knock back" these wild populations of LAB, this flora of bacteria compete with each other (and the wine yeasts) for nutrients early in fermentation.

In the winery, multiple contact points can be home to native population of LAB including oak barrels, pumps, hoses, and bottling lines. For wines where malolactic fermentation is undesirable (such as fruity white wines), the lack of proper sanitation of wine equipment can lead to the development of unwanted MLF and result in wine faults. In cases of oak barrels where full and complete sanitation is almost impossible, wineries often mark barrels that have contained wines going through MLF and keep them isolated from "clean" or brand new barrels that they can use for wines that are not destined to go through MLF.

=== Schizosaccharomyces yeast ===
Several species in the genus Schizosaccharomyces use L-malic acid, and enologists have been exploring the potential of using this wine yeast for deacidifying wines instead of the traditional route of malolactic fermentation with bacteria. However, early results with Schizosaccharomyces pombe have shown a tendency of the yeast to produce off odors and unpleasant sensory characteristics in the wine. In recent years, enologists have been experimenting with a mutant strain of Schizosaccharomyces malidevorans that has so far been shown to produce less potential wine flaws and off odors.

== Influence of inoculation timing ==
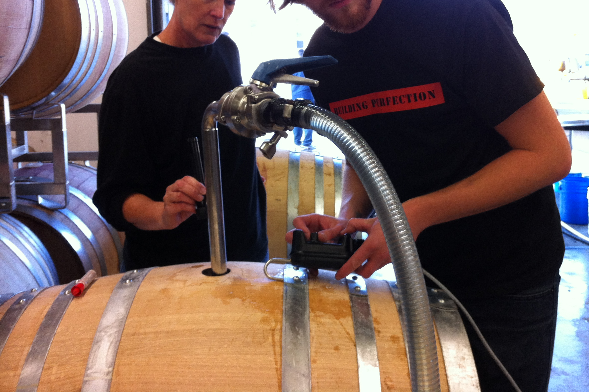
Some winemakers choose to inoculate for MLF after the wine has been racked off its lees and transferred to a barrel. If malolactic fermentation has previously taken place in the barrel, a "wild" or "natural" ferment will often take off in the barrel without any inoculation needed.

Winemakers differ in when they choose to inoculate their must with LAB, with some winemakers pitching the bacteria at the same time as the yeast, allowing both alcoholic and malolactic fermentations to run concurrently, while some wait till the end of fermentation when the wine is racked off its lees and into barrel, and others doing it somewhere between. For practitioners of minimalist or "natural winemaking" who choose not to inoculate with cultured LAB, malolactic fermentation can happen at any time depending on several factors such as the microbiological flora of the winery and the competing influences of these other microbes. All options have potential benefits and disadvantages.

The benefits of inoculating for MLF during alcoholic fermentation include:

- More potential nutrients from the grape must (though the bacteria will be competing with the yeast for these)
- Lower sulfur dioxide and ethanol levels which can otherwise inhibit the LAB
- Higher fermentation temperatures which are more conducive to LAB growth and an earlier completion of MLF: The optimal temperatures for malolactic fermentation are between 20 and 37 °C (68 and 99 °F), while the process is significantly inhibited at temperatures below 15 °C (59 °F). Wine stored in the barrels in the cellar during the winter following fermentation will often have a very prolonged malolactic fermentation due to the cool cellar temperatures.
- Early completion of malolactic fermentation means the winemaker can make a postfermentation SO_{2} earlier to protect the wine from oxidation and spoilage microbes (such as Acetobacter). Since sulfur dioxide can inhibit MLF, delaying LAB inoculation till after alcoholic fermentation may mean a delay in sulfur addition till early spring when cellar temperatures warm up enough to encourage the completion of MLF.
- Less diacetyl production

The disadvantages for early inoculation include:

- Wine yeast and LAB competing for resources (including glucose) and potential antagonism between the microbes
- Heterofermenters such as O. oeni metabolizing the glucose still present in the must and potentially creating undesirable byproducts such as acetic acid

Many of the advantages for postalcoholic fermentation answer the disadvantages of early inoculation (namely less antagonism and potential for undesirable byproducts). Also, the advantage is seen of the lees being a nutrient source through the autolysis of the dead yeast cells, though that nutrient source may not always be enough to ensure MLF runs successfully to completion. Conversely, many of the disadvantages of late inoculation are the absence of the advantages that come from early inoculation (higher temperatures, potentially quicker completion, etc.).

== Preventing MLF ==
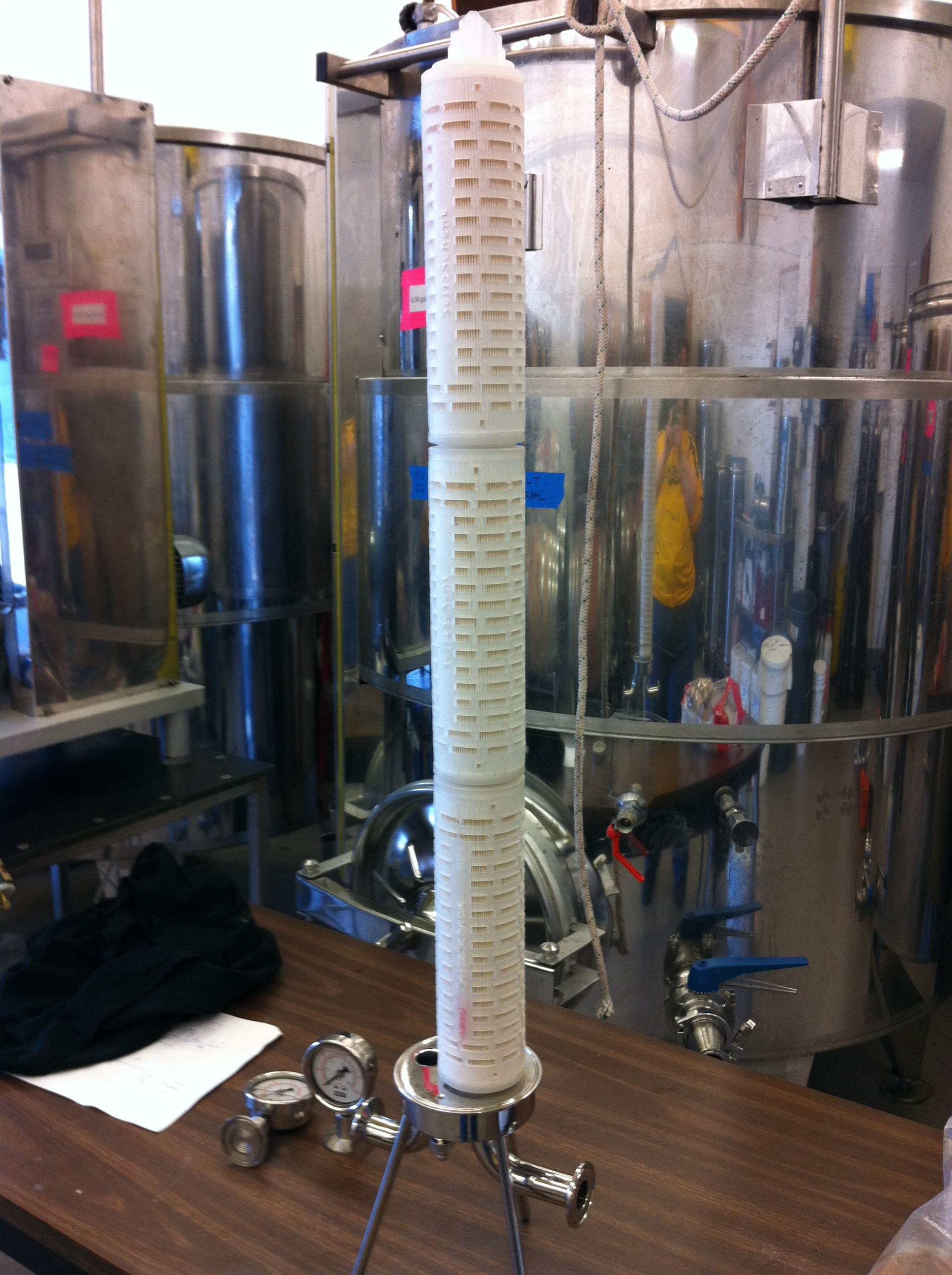
Wines that have not gone through malolactic fermentation will often be "sterile bottled" with a 0.45-micron membrane filter (pictured without housing).

For some wine styles, such as light, fruity wines or for low-acid wines from warm climates, malolactic fermentation is not desired. Winemakers can take several steps to prevent MLF from taking place, including:

- Limited maceration, early pressing, and early racking to limit contact time of the LAB with potential nutrient sources
- Maintain sulfur dioxide levels to at least 25 ppm of "free" (unbound) SO_{2}, depending on the pH of the wine, this may mean an addition of 50–100 mg/L of SO_{2}
- Maintain pH levels below 3.3
- Keep the wine cool at temperatures between 10 and 14 °C (50. 0 to 57.2 °F)
- Filter the wine at bottling with at least a 0.45-micron membrane filter to prevent any bacteria from making it into the bottle

In addition, winemakers can use chemical and biological inhibitors such as lysozyme, nisin, dimethyl dicarbonate (Velcorin), and fumaric acid, though some (like Verlcorin) are restricted in winemaking countries outside the United States. Fining agents, such as bentonite, and putting the wine through cold stabilization will also remove potential nutrients for LAB, thus inhibiting malolactic fermentation. Some experimentation with the use of bacteriophages (viruses that infect bacteria) has been conducted to limit malolactic fermentations, but disappointing results in the cheesemaking industry have led to skepticism about the practical use of bacteriophages in winemaking.

== Measuring malic content ==
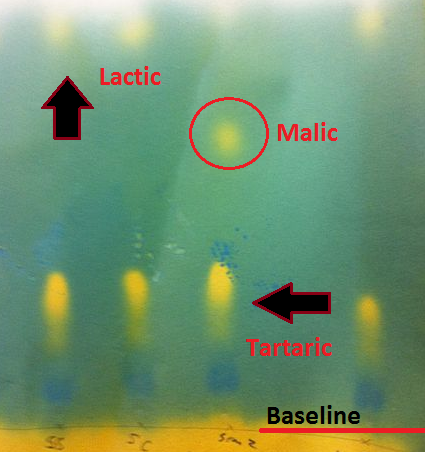
A paper chromatography sheet showing that one wine still has some level of malic present while the other three wines have seemingly gone through malolactic fermentation

Winemakers can track the progression of malolactic fermentation by paper chromatography or with a spectrophotometer. The paper chromatography method involves using capillary tubes to add small samples of the wine to chromatograph paper. The paper is then rolled and placed in a jar filled with a butanol solution containing bromocresol green indicator dye for several hours. After the paper is pulled out and dried, the distance of yellow-colored "splotches" from the base line denotes the presence of various acids, with tartaric being closest to the baseline followed by citric, malic, and finally lactic acids near the top of the paper.

A significant limitation to paper chromatography is that it will not show exactly how much malic is still remaining in the wine, with the size of the "splotch" on the paper having no correlation to a quantitative figure. The sensitivity of the paper is also limited to a detection threshold of 100–200 mg/L while most measurements of "MLF stability" target a malic level of less than 0.03 g/L (30 mg/L).

The enzymatic method allows for a quantitative measurement of both malic and lactic acids, but requires the expense of reagent kits and a spectrophotometer that can measure absorbance values at 334, 340, or 365 nm.

== Other products produced ==
The main products of malolactic fermentation are lactic acid, diacetyl, acetic acid, acetoin, and various esters. The amount and exact nature of these products depends on the species/strain of LAB conducting the malolactic fermentation and the condition influencing that wine (pH, available nutrients, oxygen levels, etc.).

Some strains of O. oeni can synthesize higher alcohols which can contribute to fruity notes in the aroma of the wine. Additionally, some strains of the bacterium have beta-glucosidase enzymes that can break down monoglucosides which are aroma compounds attached to a sugar molecule. When the sugar component is cleaved, the rest of the compound becomes volatilized, meaning it can potentially be detected in the aroma bouquet of the wine.

In the early 21st century, some strains of O. oeni were shown to use acetaldehyde by breaking it down into ethanol or acetic acid. While this may help for wines with excessive levels of acetaldehyde, for red wines, it can also destabilize the color of the wine by interfering with acetaldehyde's reaction with anthocyanins to create polymeric pigments that help create a wine's color.

=== Diacetyl ===
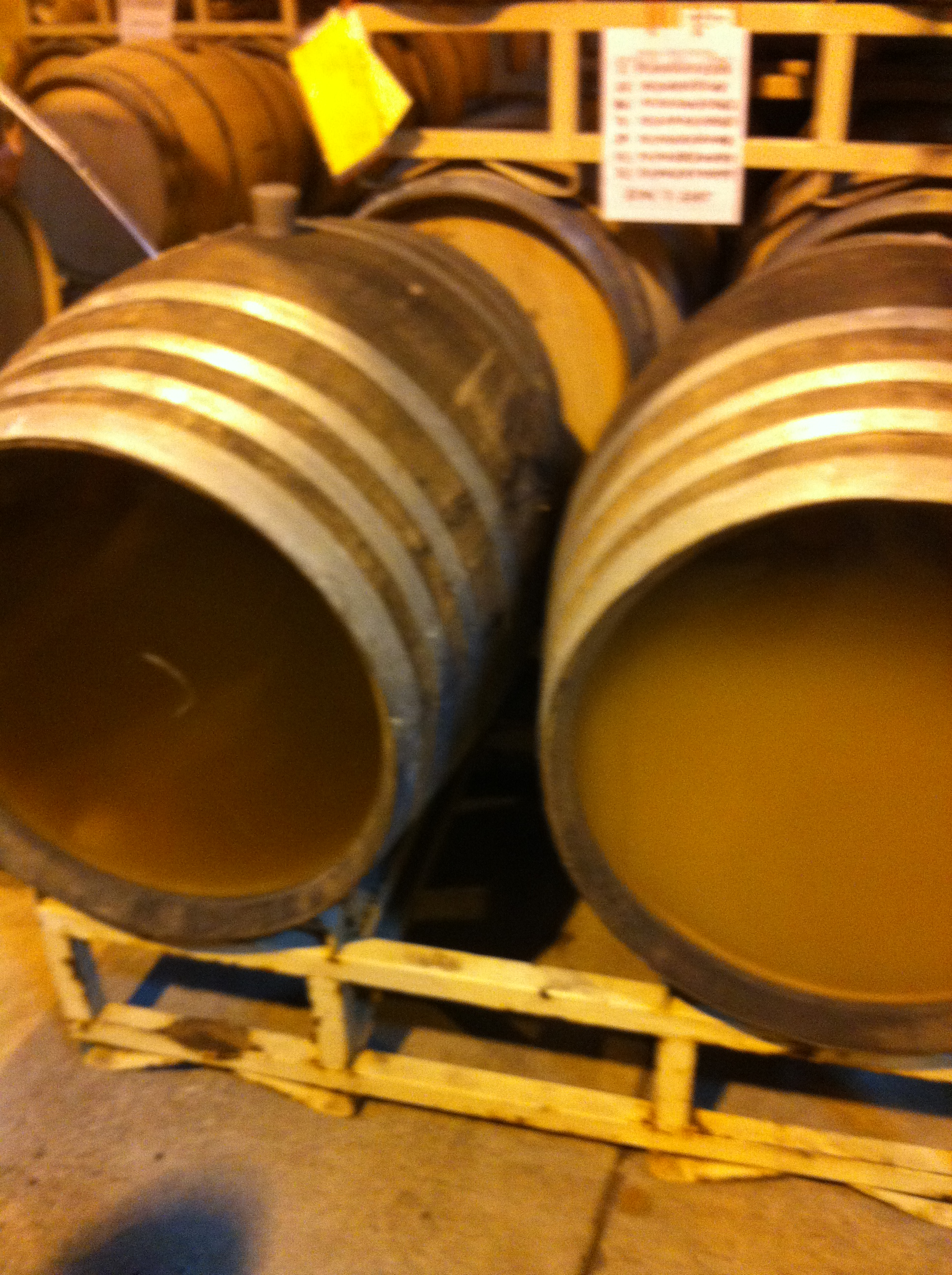
Winemakers can encourage diacetyl production by keeping the wine sur lie in the barrel. The barrel on the right has recently been stirred with a bâtonage tool.

Diacetyl (or 2,3-butanedione) is the compound associated with the "buttery" aromas of Chardonnays, but it can affect any wine that has gone through malolactic fermentation. At an odor detection threshold of 0.2 mg/L in white wines and 2.8 mg/L in red wines, it can be perceived as slightly buttery or "nutty" while at concentrations greater than 5 to 7 mg/L (5-7 ppm) can overwhelm other aroma notes in the wine.

Diacetyl can be produced by the LAB through metabolism of sugar or of citric acid. While citric acid is naturally present in grapes, it is in a very small amount with most of it coming from deliberate addition by the winemaker to acidify the wine. In the presence of both malic and citric acids, the LAB use both, but use the malic much more quickly, with the rate of citric use/diacetyl formation influenced by the particular bacterial strain (with most strains of O. oeni producing less diacetyl than Lactobacillus and Pediococcis species), as well as the redox potential of the wine. In wine conditions that have a low redox potential (meaning it is more oxidative such as in a barrel that is not fully topped up), more citric acid will be consumed and diacetyl formed. In more reductive conditions, such as in alcoholic fermentations where yeast populations are at their peak and the wine is heavily saturated with carbon dioxide, the formation of diacetyl is much slower. The yeasts also help keep levels low by consuming diacetyl and reducing it to acetoin and butylene glycol.

Diacetyl production is favored in fermentations that run warm with temperatures between 18 and 25 °C (64 and 77 °F). It also tends to be produced at higher levels in wines with lower pH levels (under 3.5), though at levels below 3.2, most strains of LAB desirable for MLF tend to be inhibited. "Wild" (as in uninoculated) malolactic ferments have the potential to produce more diacetyl than inoculated ferments due to the lower initial populations during the lag phase with inoculated ferments usually having an initial inoculum of 10^{6} CFU/mL. Late MLF inoculations, after alcoholic fermentation, also tend to produce higher levels of diacetyl. Chardonnay producers desiring to make the high-diacetyl "buttery style" will often do late or "wild" inoculation in the barrel after primary fermentation, allowing the wine to spend several weeks or even months sur lie in reductive conditions that promote diacetyl production. Some sources point out that diacetyl is actually decreased by sur lie, due to surviving yeast metabolizing diacetyl, and therefore malolactic fermentation is best performed apart from lees.

With wines that have excessive levels of diacetyl, some winemakers use sulfur dioxide to bind with the compound and reduce the perception of diacetyl by 30 to 60%. This binding is a reversible process and after only a few weeks aging in the bottle or tank, the high levels of diacetyl return. However, sulfur dioxide added earlier in the malolactic fermentation process limits diacetyl production by inhibiting the bacteria and limiting their activity in its entirety, including the conversion of malic to lactic acid.

== Wine faults ==
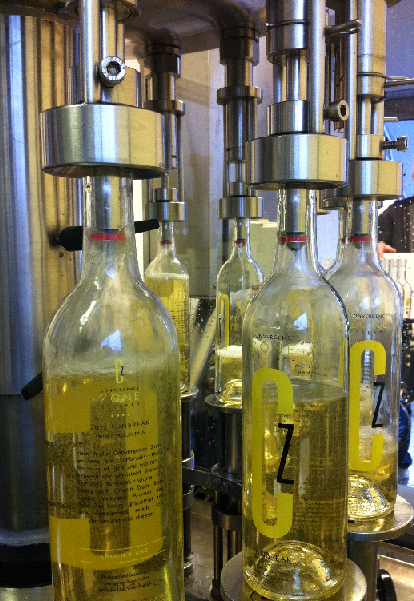
To prevent malolactic fermentation from happening in the bottle, wineries must have high levels of sanitation throughout the winemaking process.

The most common fault associated with malolactic fermentation is its occurrence when it is not desired. This could be for a wine that is meant to be acidic and fruity (such as Riesling) or it could be a wine that was previously thought to have gone through MLF and bottled only to have malolactic fermentation commence in the bottle. The outcome of this "in-bottle" fermentation is often gassy, hazy wine that can be unpalatable to consumers. Improvement in sanitation and control of lactic acid bacteria in the winery can limit the occurrence of these faults.

For early Vinho Verde producers, the slight effervesce that came from in-bottle malolactic fermentation was considered a distinguishing trait that consumers enjoyed in the wine. However, wineries had to market the wine in opaque bottles to mask the turbidity and sediment that the "in-bottle MLF" produced. Today, most Vinho Verde producers no longer follow this practice and instead complete malolactic fermentation prior to bottle with the slight sparkle being added by artificial carbonation.

While not necessarily a fault, malolactic fermentation does have the potential of making a wine "protein unstable" due to the resulting change in pH which affects the solubility of proteins in wine. For this reason, protein fining and heat stability tests on wine usually take place after malolactic fermentation has run to completion.

=== Volatile acidity ===
While volatile acidity (VA) is usually measured in terms of acetic acid content, its sensory perception is a combination of acetic (vinegary aromas) and ethyl acetate (nail polish remover and model airplane glue aromas). High levels of VA can inhibit wine yeast and may lead to a sluggish or stuck fermentation. Several microbes can be a source for VA, including Acetobacter, Brettanomyces, and film yeast such as Candida, as well as LAB. However, while LAB usually only produce acetic acid, these other microbes often produce ethyl acetate, as well as acetic acid.

Most wine-producing countries have laws regulating the amount volatile acidity permitted for wine available for sale and consumption. In the United States, the legal limit is 0.9 g/L for foreign wine exported to the United States, 1.2 g/L for white table wine, 1.4 g/L for red wine, 1.5 g/L for white dessert wine, and 1.7 g/L for red dessert wine. European Union wine regulations limit VA to 1.08 g/L for white table wines and 1.20 g/L for red table wines.

Heterofermenting species of Oenococcus and Lactobacillus have the potential to produce high levels of acetic acid through the metabolism of glucose, though with most strains of O. oeni, the amount is usually only 0.1 to 0.2 g/L. Several species of Pediococcus can also produce acetic acid through other pathways. Wines starting out with a high pH levels (above 3.5) stand the greatest risk of excessive acetic acid production due to the more favorable conditions for Lactobacillus and Pediococcus species. L. Kunkeei, one of the so-called "ferocious Lactobacillus" species, has been known to produce 3 to 5 g/L of acetic acid in wines—levels which can easily lead to stuck fermentations.

=== "Ferocious" Lactobacillus ===
In the late 20th century, among American winemakers, seemingly healthy fermentation were reported becoming rapidly inundated with high levels of acetic acid that overcame wine yeasts and led to stuck fermentations. While a novel species of Acetobacter or wine spoilage yeast was initially thought to be the culprit, it was eventually discovered to be several species of Lactobacillus, L. kunkeei, L. nagelii, and L. hilgardii, collectively nicknamed "ferocious" Lactobacillus for their aggressive acetic acid production, how quickly they multiply, and their high tolerance to sulfur dioxides and other microbiological controls.

Ferments of high-pH wines (greater than 3.5) that spent time cold soaking prior to yeast inoculations and received little to no sulfur dioxide during crushing seem to be at the most risk for "ferocious" Lactobacillus. While infection seems to be vineyard-specific, currently, none of any of the implicated lactobacilli has been reported as being found on the surface of freshly harvested wine grapes.

=== Acrolein and mannitol taint ===
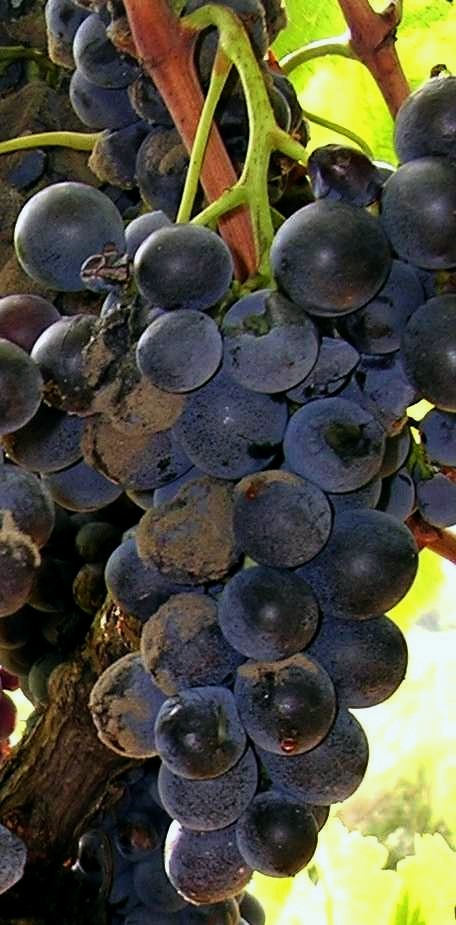
Wine grapes infected with Botrytis bunch rot tend to have higher levels of glycerol which can be metabolized by LAB into acrolein. Especially in red wine grapes with their high phenolic content, this can lead to the development of bitter-tasting wines as the acrolein interacts with these phenolics.

The degradation of glycerol by some strains of LAB can yield the compound acrolein. Glycerol is a sweet-tasting polyol present in all wines, but at higher levels in wines that have been infected with Botrytis cinerea. An "active-aldehyde", acrolein can interact with some phenolic compounds in wine to create highly bitter-tasting wines, described as amertume by Pasteur. While at least one strain of O. oeni has been shown to produce acrolein, it is more commonly found in wines that have been infected by strains of Lactobacillus and Pediococcus species such as L. brevis, L. buchneri, and P. parvulus. Acrolein taint has also shown to be more common in wines that have been fermented at high temperatures and/or made from grapes that have been harvested at high Brix levels.

Heterofermenting species from the genus Lactobacillus, as well as some wild strains of O. oeni, have the potential to metabolize fructose (one of the main sugars in wine) into the sugar alcohols mannitol and (less commonly) erythritol. These are sweet-tasting compounds can add sweetness to a wine where it is not desired (such as Cabernet Sauvignon). Mannitol taint, described as mannite by Pasteur, in wines is often accompanied by other wine faults, including the presence of excessive levels of acetic acid, diacetyl, lactic acid, and 2-butanol, which can contribute to a "vinegary-estery" aroma. The wine may also have a slimy sheen on the surface.

=== Fresno mold and ropiness ===
In the mid-20th century, a cottony mycelium-like growth began appearing in the bottles of some sweet fortified wines produced in California's Central Valley. Being fortified, these wines often had alcohol levels in excess of 20% which is usually a level that discourages growth of most spoilage organisms associated with winemaking. Nicknamed "Fresno mold" due to where it was first discovered, the culprit of this growth was determined to be L. fructivorans, a species which can be controlled by sanitation and maintaining adequate sulfur dioxide levels.

Some Lactobacillus and Pediococcus species (particularly P. damnosus and P. pentosaceus) have the potential to synthesize polysaccharides that add an oily viscosity to the wine. In the case of Lactobacillus, some of these saccharides may be glucans that can be synthesized from glucose present in the wine as low as 50–100 mg/L (0.005 to 0.01% residual sugar) and afflict seemingly "dry" wines. While "ropiness" can occur in the barrel or tank, it is often observed in the wines several months after they are bottled. Wines with pH levels above 3.5 and low sulfur dioxide levels are at most risk for developing this fault.

Called graisse (or "grease") by the French and les vins filant by Pasteur, this fault has been observed in apple wines and cider. It can also be potentially be caused by other spoilage microbes such as Streptococcus mucilaginous, Candida krusei, and Acetobacter rancens.

=== Mousiness and geranium taint ===
Wines infected with L. brevis, L. hilgardii, and L. fermentum have been known to occasionally develop an aroma reminiscent of rodent droppings. The aroma becomes more pronounced when the wine is rubbed between the fingers and, if consumed, can leave a long, unpleasant finish. The aroma can be very potent, detectable at a sensory threshold as low as 1.6 parts per billion (μg/l). The exact compound behind this is derivatives of the amino acid lysine created through an oxidation reaction with ethanol. While undesirable LAB species have been most commonly associated with this fault, wine infected by Brettanomyces yeast in the presence of ammonium phosphate and lysine have also been known to exhibit this fault.

Sorbate is often used as a yeast-inhibitor by home winemakers to stop alcoholic fermentation in the production of sweet wines. Most species of lactic acid bacteria can synthesize sorbate to produce 2-ethoxyhexa-3,5-diene which has the aroma of crushed geranium leaves.

=== Tourne ===
Compared to malic and citric acids, tartaric acid is usually considered microbiologically stable. However, some species of Lactobacillus (particularly L. brevis and L. plantarum) have the potential to degrade tartaric acid in wine, reducing a wine's total acidity by 3-50%. French winemakers had long observed this phenomenon and called it tourne (meaning "turn to brown") in reference to the color change that can occur in the wine at the same time likely due to other processes at work in addition to the tartaric loss. While Lactobacillus is the most common culprit of tourne, some species of the spoilage film yeast Candida can also metabolize tartaric acid.

=== Health-related faults ===
Cadaverine is one of the biogenic amines that some LAB species, particularly from the Lactobacillus and Pediococcus genera, have the potential to produce.

While the presence of ethyl carbamate is not a sensory wine fault, the compound is a suspected carcinogen which is subjected to regulation in many countries. The compound is produced from the degradation of the amino acid arginine which is present in both grape must and released in the wine through the autolysis of dead yeast cells. While the use of urea as a source of yeast assimilable nitrogen (no longer legal in most countries) was the most common cause of ethyl carbamate in wine, both O. oeni and L. buchneri have been known to produce carbamyl phosphate and citrulline which can be precursors to ethyl carbamate formation. L. hilgardii, one of the "ferocious Lactobacillus" species, has also been suspected of contributing to ethyl carbamate production. In the United States, the Alcohol and Tobacco Tax and Trade Bureau has established a voluntary target limit of ethyl carbamate in wine to less than 15 μg/L for table wines and less than 60 μg/L for dessert wines.

Biogenic amines have been implicated as a potential cause of red wine headaches. In wine, histamine, cadaverine, phenylethylamine, putrescine, and tyramine have all been detected. These amines are created by the degradation of amino acids found in grape must and left over from the breakdown of dead yeast cells after fermentation. Most LAB have the potential to create biogenic amines, even some strains of O. oeni, but high levels of biogenic amines are most often associated with species from the Lactobacillus and Pediococcus genera. In the European Union, the concentration of biogenic amines in wine is beginning to be monitored, while the United States currently does not have any regulations.
