= Yeast assimilable nitrogen =

Form of nitrogen available to wine yeast to use during fermentation

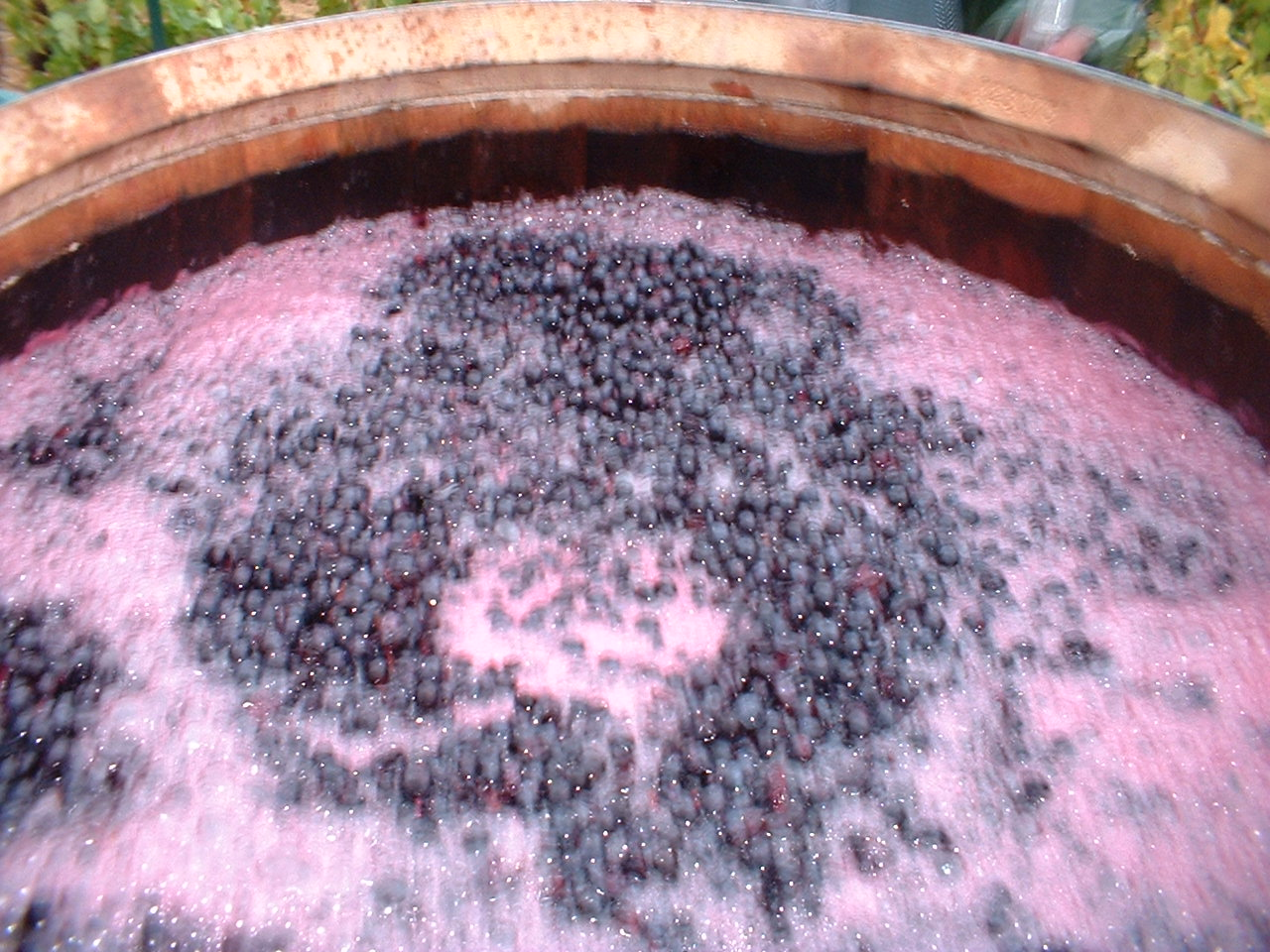
Yeast need a reliable source of nitrogen in forms that they can assimilate in order to successfully complete fermentation.

Yeast assimilable nitrogen or YAN is the combination of free amino nitrogen (FAN), ammonia (NH_{3}) and ammonium (NH_{4}^{+}) that is available for a yeast, e.g. the wine yeast Saccharomyces cerevisiae, to use during fermentation. Outside of the fermentable sugars glucose and fructose, nitrogen is the most important nutrient needed to carry out a successful fermentation that doesn't end prior to the intended point of dryness or sees the development of off-odors and related wine faults. To this extent winemakers will often supplement the available YAN resources with nitrogen additives such as diammonium phosphate (DAP).

However, the addition of excessive amounts of nitrogen can also create a hazard as other organisms besides beneficial wine yeast can utilize the nutrients. These include spoilage organisms such as Brettanomyces, Acetobacter and Lactic acid bacteria from the Lactobacillus and Pediococcus genera. This is why many wineries will measure the YAN after harvest and crushing using one of several methods available today including the nitrogen by o-phthaldialdehyde assay (NOPA) which requires the use of a spectrometer or the Formol titration method. Knowing the YAN in the must allows winemakers to calculate the right amount of additive needed to get through fermentation, leaving only "nutrient desert" for any spoilage organisms that come afterwards.

The amount of YAN that winemakers will see in their grape musts depends on a number of components including grape variety, rootstock, vineyard soils and viticultural practices (such as the use of fertilizers and canopy management) as well as the climate conditions of particular vintages.

== Components ==
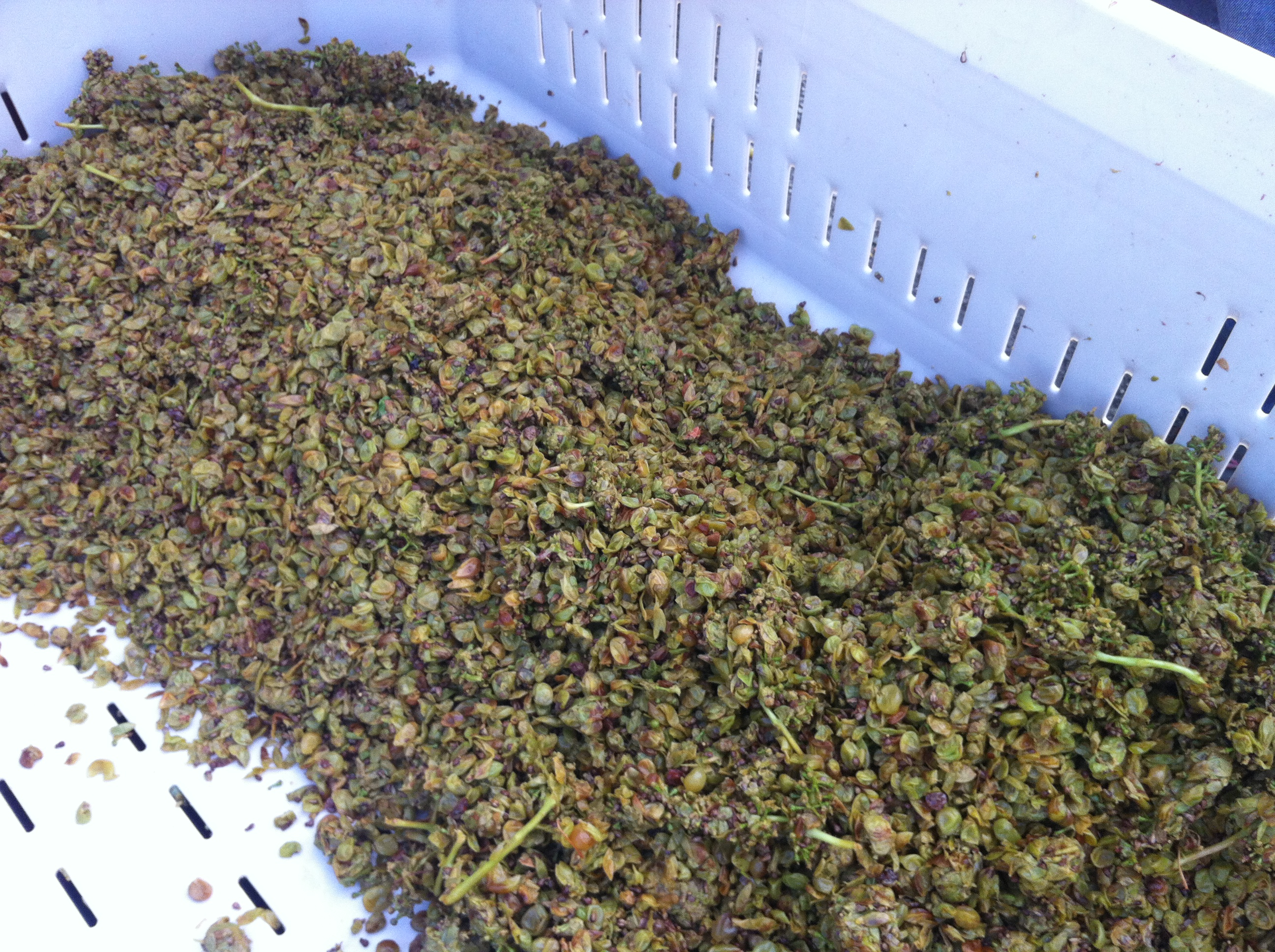
Most of a grape's YAN content is found in the skins and seeds which gets left behind as pomace after pressing.

YAN is a measurement of the primary organic (free amino acids) and inorganic (ammonia and ammonium) sources of nitrogen that can be assimilated by S. cerevisiae. There are several nitrogenous compounds found in must and wine including peptides, larger proteins, amides, biogenic amines, pyridines, purines and nucleic acids but these cannot be directly used by yeast for metabolism. Taken together, the total nitrogen content of grape must can range from 60 to 2400 mg of nitrogen per liter, however not all of this nitrogen will be assimilable. The lack of protease enzymes, which break down larger peptides into smaller components, that can work outside the cell, limits the size of the molecules that yeast can use as a source for nitrogen.

The amount of YAN that winemakers will see in their grape musts depends on a number of components including grape variety, rootstock, vineyard soils and viticultural practices (such as the use of fertilizers and canopy management) as well as the climate conditions of particular vintages. Infections by mold, such as Botrytis cinerea (known as noble rot when it is desired) can reduce the amino acid content of grape must by as much as 61%. Some regions are noted for having low YAN such as Washington State which during a typical vintage will have 90% of tested must below 400 mg N/L and nearly a quarter be below 150 mg N/L.

In the vineyard, nitrogen is taken up by the grapevine as nitrate (NO_{3}^{−}), ammonium or urea which gets reduced into ammonia. Through additional reactions the nitrogen is incorporated into glutamine and glutamate and eventually used in the synthesis of other amino acids and nitrogenous compounds. After harvest, the majority (around 80%) of available nitrogenous compounds found in the grapes are concentrated in the skins and seeds. These compounds get released into the must during the process of crushing and during maceration/skin contact. Even after pressing up to 80% of initial nitrogen content within each grape berry will be left behind in the pomace.

=== Amino acids ===
Of the Free Amino Nitrogen (FAN) that make up YAN, the amino acids arginine, proline and glutamine are the most abundant followed by alanine, threonine, serine and aspartic acid in much smaller concentrations though trace amounts of most known amino acids can be found in grape must. Proline is usually the most concentrated and can represent up to 30% of the total amount of amino acids. The exact amount FAN will vary and can range 22 to 1242 mg of nitrogen/liter of YAN being derived from free amino acids.

Specialized transporter proteins (far left) within the plasma membrane of yeast cells bring amino acid residues and small peptides into the cell coupled with a hydrogen ion that later gets expelled by the cell.

While arginine, glutamine and other amino acids are rapidly consumed often very early in fermentation, proline is not consumed by yeast at all during the normal, anaerobic conditions of fermentations. This is because one of the enzymes required for its use is an oxidase (requiring molecular oxygen) and the other is repressed by the presence of ammonium (another source of assimilable nitrogen needed by yeast) in the must. However, well aerated starter cultures that contain must which hasn't had any diammonium phosphate added it to it will usually see some utilization of proline before the anaerobic conditions of fermentation kick in. When winemakers measure FAN, they need to be aware if their assay is including proline since this will make their YAN measurement higher. Chardonnay and Cabernet Sauvignon are two Vitis vinifera varieties that are known to have very high proline levels while Riesling and Sauvignon blanc usually have very low levels.

Yeast transport amino acids and small peptides (less than 5 amino acid residues) into the cell via an active transport process that utilizes specialized membrane proteins and the difference in the pH gradient of the acidic wine solution (pH between 3-4) and the near neutral pH of cytoplasm inside the yeast cells. The proton symport proteins in the membrane take in the amino acid coupled with a hydrogen ion that later gets expelled by the cell via a hydrogen ion pump. This is an energy dependent process that becomes more energetically unfavorable for the yeast cell as fermentation progressed and ethanol levels increase, creating "passive leakage" of excess hydrogen ions into the cell. The cell's hydrogen ion pumps have to work even harder to maintain its internal pH so it sends a signal to the symport proteins to stop bringing other ions. This is one of the reasons why late fermentation nitrogen additions have little to no effective as the transport mechanisms of the nitrogen into the cell are shut down.

=== Ammonia compounds ===
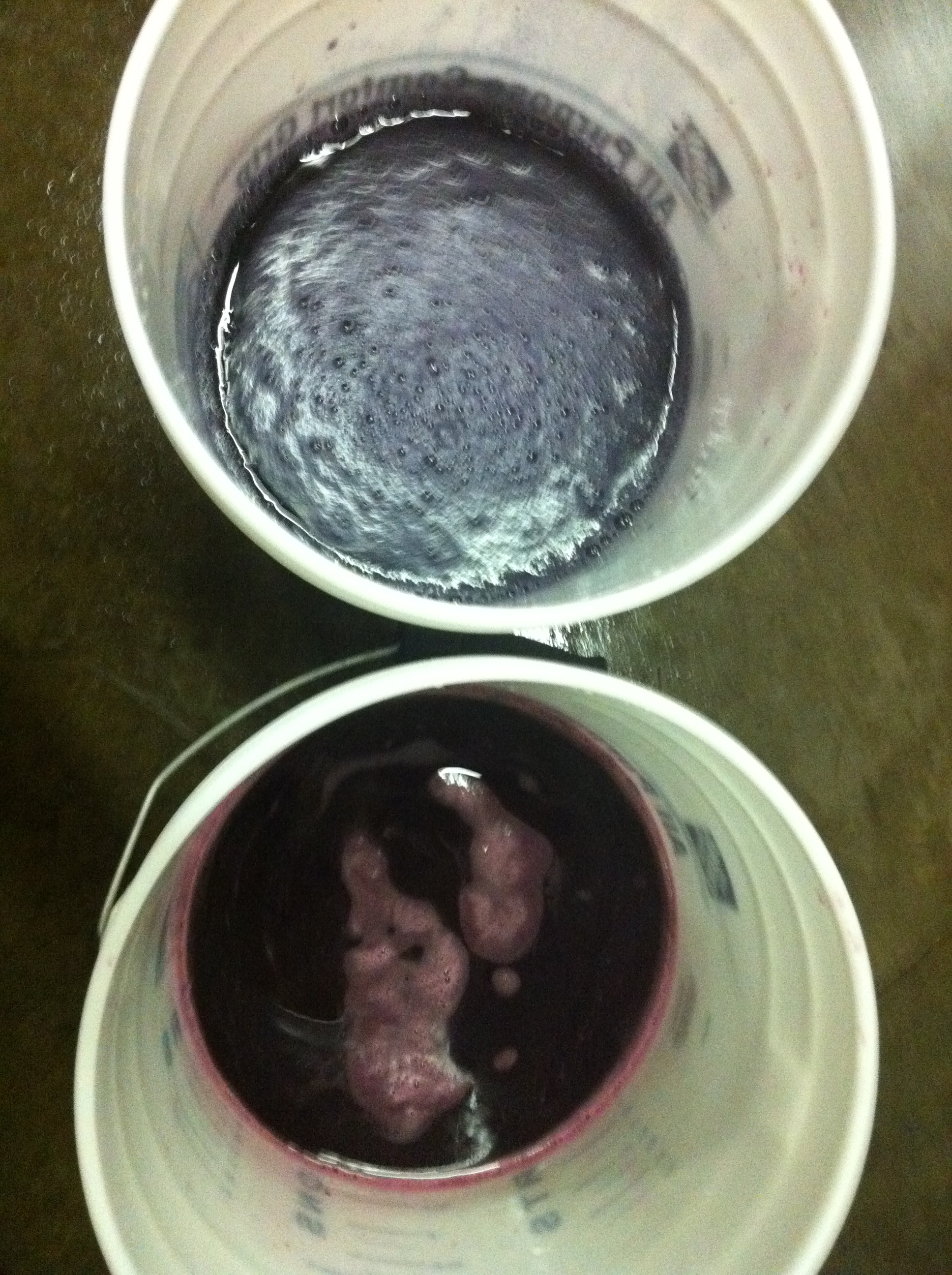
Two buckets of red wine must with the top bucket showing the bluish color change after diammonium phosphate (an ammonia base) is added to the wine.

Throughout fermentation ammonium is the primary form of assimilable nitrogen available to yeast. However, at crushing the juice may contain anywhere from 0 to 150 mg/L of ammonium salts, depending on the how much nitrogen the grapevine received in the vineyard.

In the cell, the inorganic ammonia and ammonium ions get "fixed" through a series of chemical reactions that ultimately yields the organic nitrogen source glutamate. The ammonium ion also serves as an allosteric regulator for one of the enzymes used in glycolysis and may also have an effect on how the yeast cell transports glucose and fructose into the cell. The proteins used in the main glucose transport system have been shown to have a half-life of 12 hours. In the studies that put yeast cells through "ammonia starvation" the entire system shut down after 50 hours which gives strong evidence that a lack of ammonia/ammonium can create increase risk of having a stuck fermentation.

Glutathione (GSH: L-gamma-glutamyl-L-cysteinylglycine) is present in high concentrations up to 10 mM in yeast cells. It assumes a pivotal role in response to sulfur and nitrogen starvation.

Ammonia is not used by bacteria such as Acetobacter and the lactic acid bacteria used in malolactic fermentation.

== Importance in winemaking ==
Assimilable nitrogen is an essential nutrient needed by wine yeast in order to fully complete fermentation with a minimum amount of undesirable by-products (such as compounds like hydrogen sulfide that can create off odors) created. Over the course of a fermentation, yeast may use up to a 1000 mg/L of amino acids though often far less than amount is needed. Yeast can store amino acids in intracellular vacuoles and then later either use them directly, incorporating them into proteins, or break them down and use their carbon and nitrogen components separately.

In the absence of nitrogen, yeast will begin to shut down and die off. Some strains will begin breaking down sulfur containing amino acids like cysteine and methionine releasing a sulfur atom that can combine with hydrogen to produce hydrogen sulfide (H_{2}S) which can impart rotten egg odors to the wine. However, there is not a direct correlation between YAN levels and hydrogen sulfide production since H_{2}S can be produced by yeast even in the presence of abundant nitrogen but with instead other vital nutrients (such as the vitamin pantothenic acid) lacking. There are even some strains of S. cerevisiae that produce H_{2}S as a response to having too much available nitrogen (particularly too much glutamic acid and alanine). This is why a prophylactic approach of indiscriminately adding nitrogen supplementation to every fermentation may not have the desired results of preventing H_{2}S.

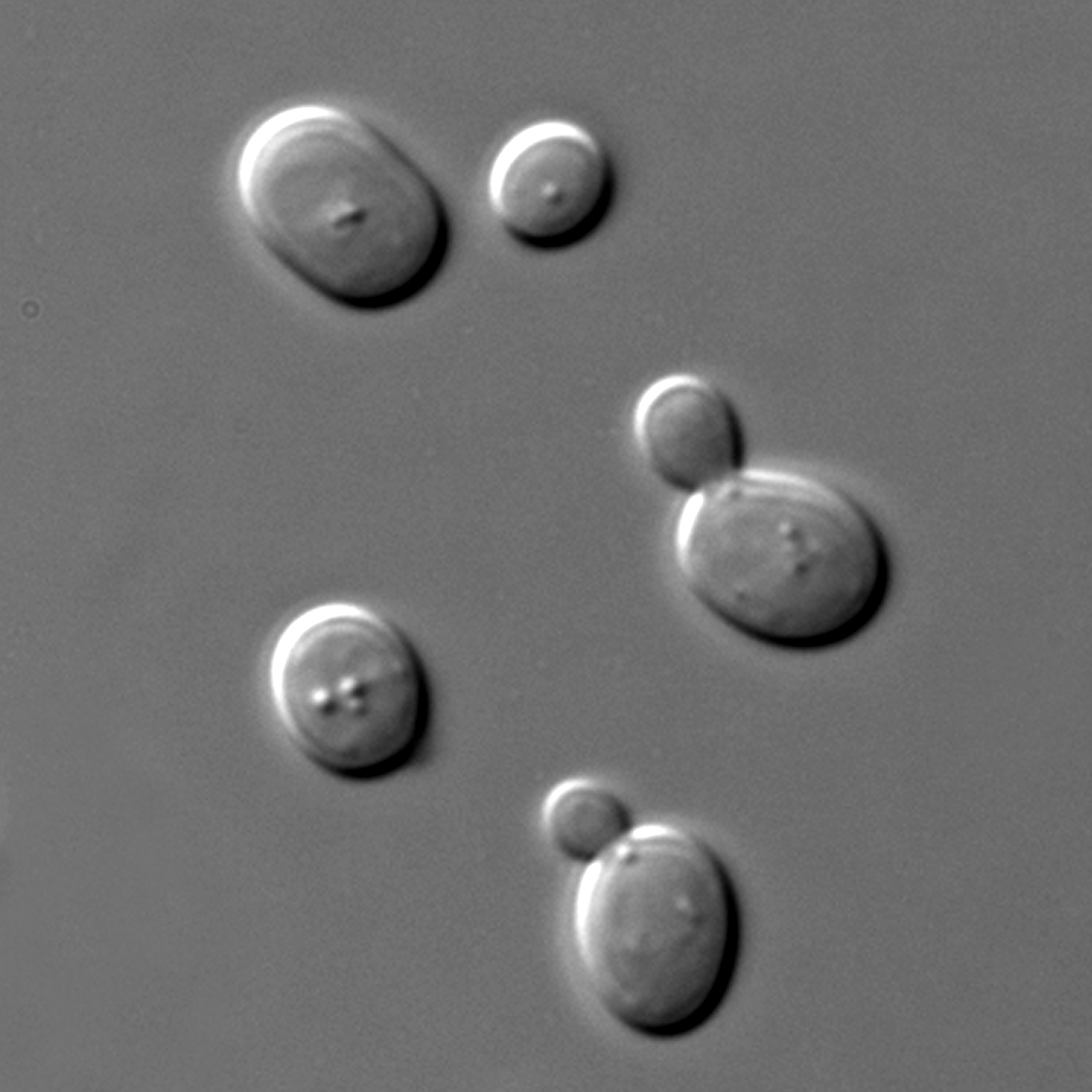
Saccharomyces cerevisiae can store amino acids in vacuoles until they are needed by the cell.

Nitrogen levels in the wine can have an influence on many sensory aspects of the resulting wine, including the synthesis of many aromatic compounds. Fusel alcohols are made by the degradation of amino acids though in the presence of high levels of ammonia and urea their production is reduced. When available nitrogen is limited, the levels of glycerol and trehalose, which may influence mouthfeel, are higher.

=== Estimates on how much is needed ===
The amount of YAN needed will depend on what the winemaker's goals are for fermentation, particularly whether or not wild fermentation is desired or if the wine will be fully fermented to dryness. The state of the grapes and the conditions of fermentation will influence the amount of nitrogen needed. Fruit that is damaged, moldy or botrytis infected will usually be more depleted of nitrogen (as well as other vitamin resources) when they come in from the vineyard than clean, intact grapes. This depletion can be further exacerbated by over clarification of the must and high sugar content. Wines fermented at higher temperatures tend to progress at a faster rate, requiring more nitrogen than longer, cooler fermentation. Also the amount of oxygen exposure will influence the rate of nitrogen uptake by the yeast with wine fermented in complete anaerobic conditions (such as many white wines in stainless steel tanks) requiring less nitrogen than wines fermented in barrels or open top fermentors.

The suggested range given by enologists varies from 150 mg/L YAN to 400 mg of nitrogen per liter. Some studies have shown that maximum fermentation rates can be achieved with YAN in the 400 to 500 mg N/L range. However, not all winemakers will want to have a fermentation going at maximum rate (in terms of yeast biomass, temperature and speed) due to the impact that it can have on other sensory aspects of the wine such as aroma development and fruit retention.

A study by the UC Davis Department of Viticulture and Enology found that recommendations on optimal nitrogen levels to complete a successful fermentation could be made based harvest brix level which have been adopted by many yeast and nutrient manufacturers.

- 21°Bx = 200 mg N/L
- 23°Bx = 250 mg N/L
- 25°Bx = 300 mg N/L
- 27°Bx = 350 mg N/L

However, other studies have shown successful fermentation be conducted with YAN levels below these recommendations as well as sluggish/stuck fermentations occurring even when YAN levels are in line with recommendations.

=== In malolactic fermentation ===
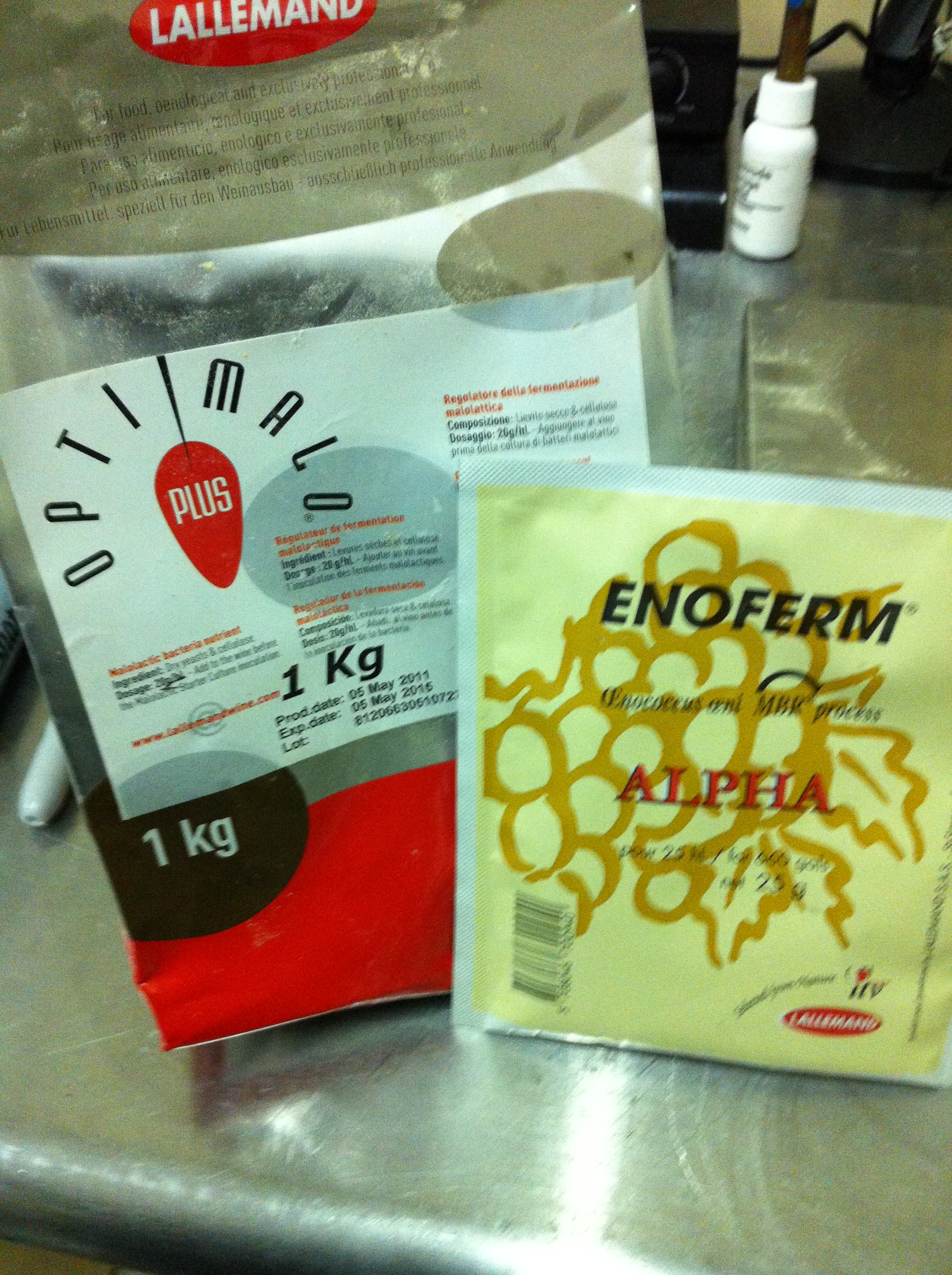
Malolactic fermentation inoculum packet and Optimalo, a nutrient supplement that contains amino acids.

Like yeast, the lactic acid bacteria (LAB) used in malolactic fermentation (generally Oenococcus oeni) requires nitrogen. However, unlike S. cerevisiae LAB can not utilize ammonia and such additions like diammonium phosphate (DAP) offers no nutritional benefits. Winemakers who inadvertently use DAP as a nutrient additive for their MLF inoculation risk providing nutrients instead for spoilage organisms such as Brettanomyces.

While some winemakers will inoculate their LAB with nutrients that include nitrogen, most of the nutrients needed for MLF come from the breakdown (or autolysis) of the dead yeast cells. Additionally, most bacteria used in MLF have the ability to produce extracellular protease enzymes that can also breakdown larger peptide chains into their base amino acid residues that can then be used for metabolism.

== Measurements and tests ==
The nitrogen by o-phthaldialdehyde assay (NOPA) is used to measure available primary amino acids in grape juice using a spectrophotometer that can measure at 335 nm wavelength. Since the assay only measures primary amino acids, the results won't include proline or ammonia concentrations. Proline can be separately measured with an assay that uses ninhydrin to react with the amino acid in the presence of formic acid, yielding a compound that can be absorbed at 517 nm.

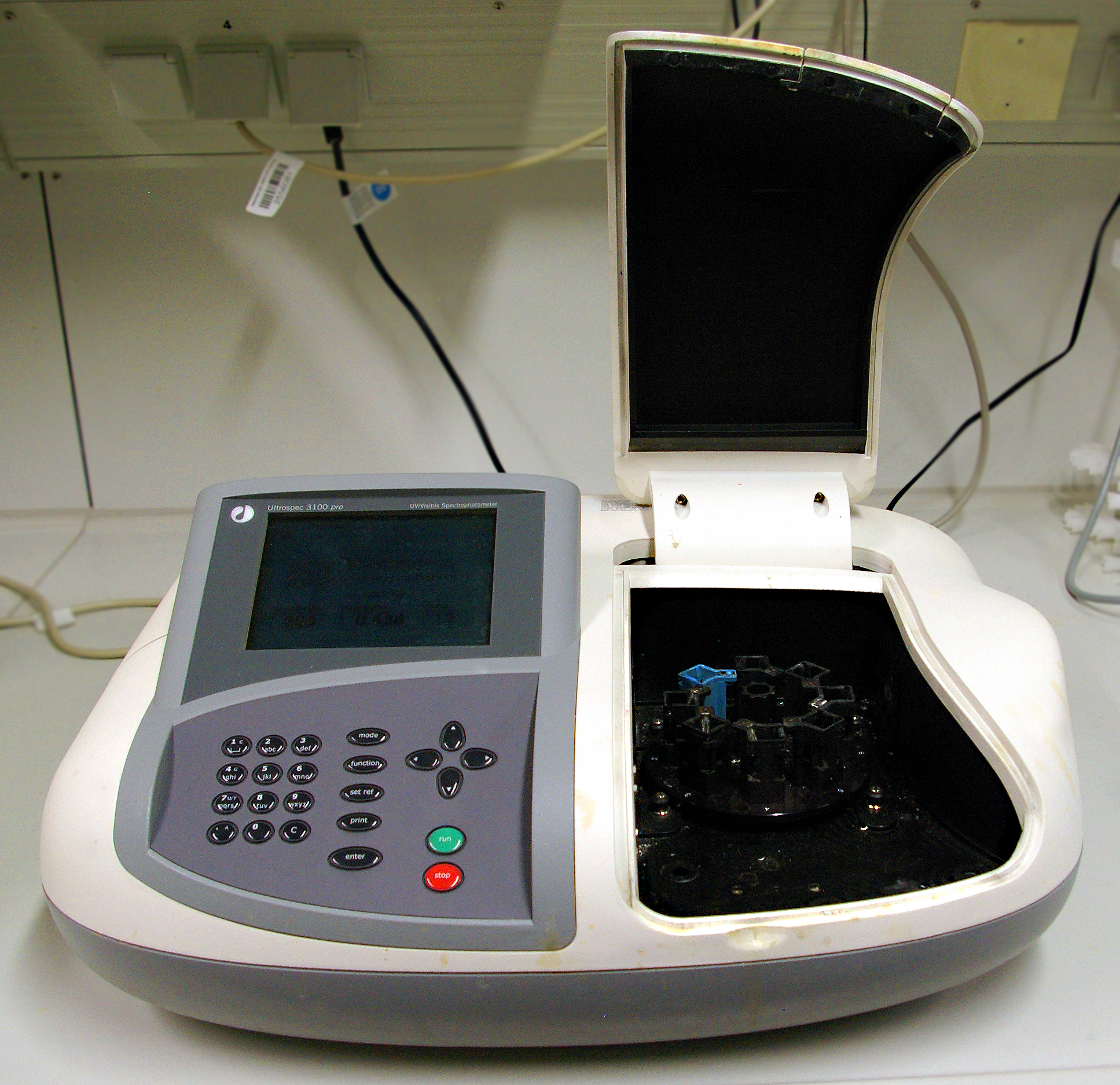
YAN levels can be measured using the NOPA assay and a spectrophotometer.

Formol titration, invented by the Danish chemist S. P. L. Sørensen in 1907, utilizes formaldehyde in the presence of potassium or sodium hydroxide to measure amino acid concentration and ammonia with the aid of a pH meter. The reagents will also react with proline which can give a slightly higher YAN measurement than NOPA. The formol titration method also has the disadvantages of involving the use and disposal of formaldehyde which is a known carcinogen and the highly toxic reagent barium chloride.

Ammonia and ammonium can be measured using an ion-selective electrode and a pH meter.

== Nitrogen supplementation ==
Winemakers have long known that some fermentations ran more predictable and "healthier" if pomace (the solid skins, seeds and remains left after pressing) from another wine was added to the batch. This is a method still used today to make the Italian wine Ripasso. In 14th century Tuscany, the technique of governo used in some of the earliest Chiantis involved adding dried grapes to the batch. While that also added sugar both methods provided extra nitrogen and other nutrients still available in the skins and seeds.

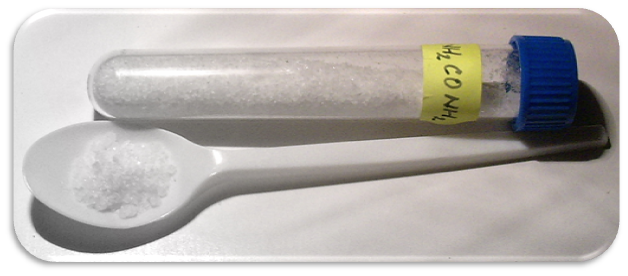
Urea.

As enologists began better understanding the science of fermentation, nitrogen was identified as a principal nutrient and winemakers as early as the 1900s began adding ammonium salts to their must. Urea was also used as an early nitrogen supplement but research linking it to the development of ethyl carbamate has led to its banning in many countries, including the United States since 1990.

There are many types of nitrogen supplements available for winemakers to use. Most of them are complex formulations that include nitrogen (from either amino acids or ammonium salts) along with vitamins, minerals and other growth factors and sold under brand names like Go-Ferm, Superfood, Fermaid K (the later two also containing some DAP). Amino acids can be added directly to the must though as of 2010 only glycine is permitted to be added to must in the United States.

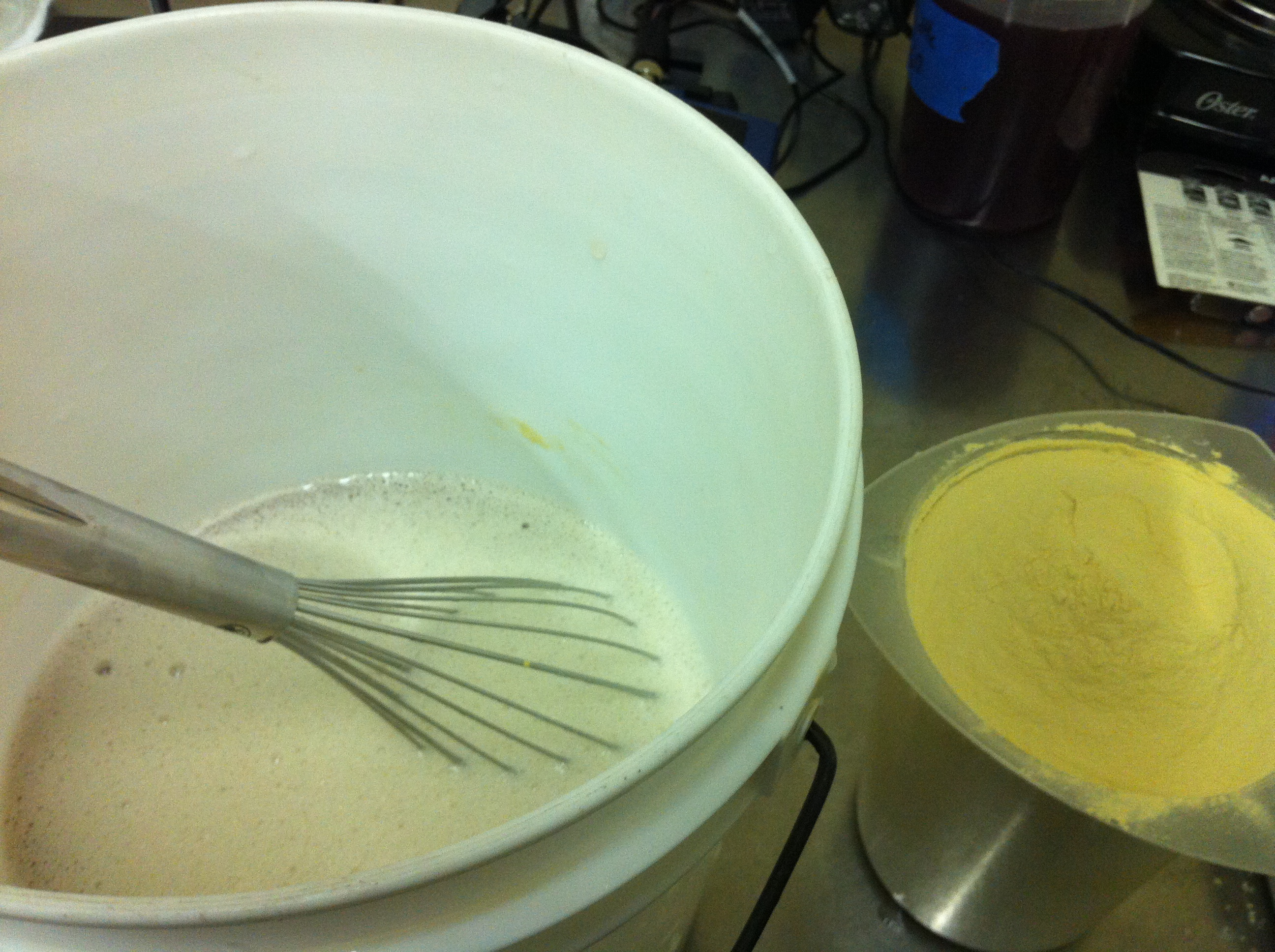
Fermaid-O is nitrogen supplement containing yeast hulls (a source of amino acids) and other vitamins but no diammonium phosphate.

Yeast hulls (or Yeast ghosts) are the remnants of yeast cell walls left over from the commercial production of yeast strains to be used for inoculation. In addition to providing a source of assimilable nitrogen from amino acids, they also provide lipids and sterols that can be used by the cells to strengthen their plasma membrane, allowing for the uptake of other sources of nitrogen.

=== Risk in adding too much ===
Nitrogen supplements, particularly DAP, stimulates yeast reproduction and can greatly increase the biomass. This could have the consequence of speeding up the fermentation rate faster than what a winemaker may desire and will also increase the fermentation temperature due to the heat being generated by the yeast. The excess biomass can also create a scarcity of other yeast nutrients, such a vitamins and sterols, due to increase competition and may lead to the production of off-odors (such as hydrogen sulfide) and even stuck fermentations.

Excessive levels of the amino acid arginine (greater than 400 mg/L), especially near the end of fermentation, can pose the risk increase the production of ethyl carbamate. This is because arginine gets broken down into urea which can be reabsorbed and utilized by yeast or metabolized into ammonia. However, urea also reacts with ethanol if it is not completely metabolized which coupled with long term exposure (as well as high temperatures) can lead to the production of the ester ethyl carbamate.

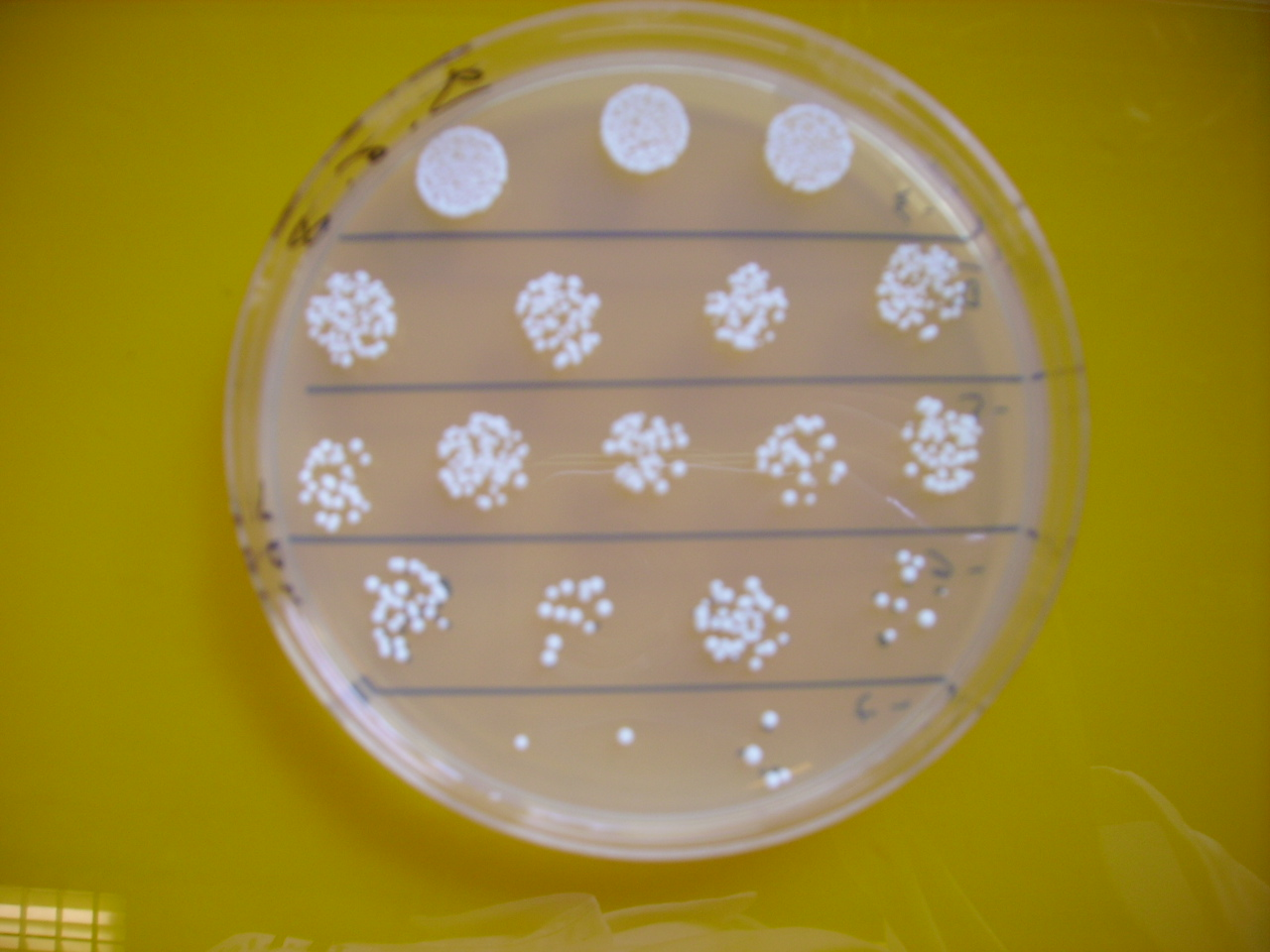
Brettanomyces is one spoilage organism that can take advantage of excess nitrogen supplementation left in the wine.

However, the greatest risk of over supplementing a must is that excess nitrogen and other nutrients will be left behind after fermentation is complete. This can create microbial instability as spoilage organisms can use these excess nutrients.

=== Wine laws and regulations ===
In the United States, the Alcohol and Tobacco Tax and Trade Bureau (TTB) limits the use of diammonium phosphate as a nitrogen additive to 968 mg/L (8 lbs/1000 gal) which provides 203 mg N/L of YAN. In the European Union, most countries follow the guidelines of the International Organisation of Vine and Wine (OIV) which dictates a limit of 300 mg/L. In Australia, the limit is based on the level of inorganic phosphate with a maximum limit of 400 mg/L of phosphate permitted.

=== Influence of timing ===
As most nutrient supplements feed all living microorganism in the must (whether desirable or not), winemakers will often wait to add the nutrients until they are ready to inoculate the must with their desired S. cerevisiae strain. Producers who are using wild ferments may also wait until after sulfur dioxide additions have killed off unwanted microbes or feed early because they would like the potential complexity that other microbes could add to the wine. When added, the nitrogen is usually in the form of amino acids, combined with vitamins and minerals to help kick start the fermentation.

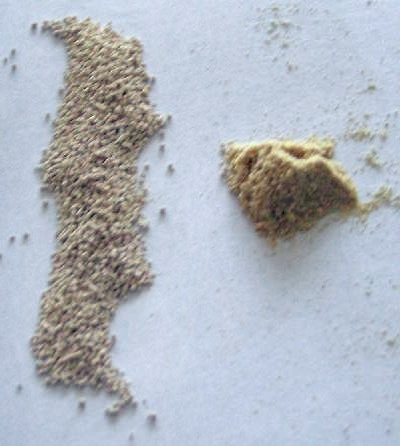
When yeast inoculum (left) is first rehydrated, the ammonium salts in DAP would be too toxic so winemakers will often use a nutrient supplement (right) that contains primarily amino acids as the nitrogen source.

Soon after inoculation, yeast begin to rapidly consume the available assimilable nitrogen with up to 46% of YAN being fully consumed by the onset of full fermentation. Because inorganic nitrogen, such as the ammonium salts in DAP, are toxic to yeast in high levels, it is never added during inoculation when the biomass of the newly re-hydrated yeast is low. Many winemakers split up the dosage of DAP with the first addition being made at the end of the lag phase when the yeast enter their period of exponential growth and alcoholic fermentation begins. In most must this is around 48 to 72 hours after inoculation. A second dosage is then often added around a third of the way through sugar fermentation and often before the sugar levels hit 12-10 Brix (6.5 to 5.5 Baumé, 48.3 to 40.0 Oechsle) because as the fermentation progresses yeast cells are no longer able to bring the nitrogen into the cell due to the increasing toxicity of ethanol surrounding the cells. This leaves the nitrogen unused and available for spoilage organisms that may come afterwards.
