= Free amino nitrogen =

Measure

In brewing and winemaking, free amino nitrogen (FAN) is a measure of the concentration of individual amino acids and small peptides (one to three units) which can be utilized by yeast and wine yeast for cell growth and proliferation. Together with ammonia, FAN makes up the measurement of yeast assimilable nitrogen that can be measured prior to the start of fermentation.

The exact components of FAN will vary from the composition of the wort or grape must. In wine, all 21 amino acids can be found in trace amounts with arginine, proline and glutamine being the most abundant. However, as Saccharomyces cerevisiae, the primary yeast for both beer and wine, can not utilize proline in the anaerobic conditions of ethanol fermentation it is not included in FAN (and subsequently YAN) calculations.

== In winemaking ==
The amount of FAN that winemakers will see in their grape depends on a number of components including grape variety, rootstock, vineyard soils and viticultural practices (such as the use of fertilizers and canopy management) as well as the climate conditions of particular vintages. The typical wine grape will have anywhere from 22 to 1242 mg of nitrogen/liter derived from free amino acids.

== In brewing ==
For vigorous fermentation, a sufficient quantity of FAN must be present in the wort. An excessive concentration in the wort is not desirable however, as this may cause the production of a significant quantity of fusel alcohols, or spoilage of the finished beer by other organisms.
