= Nonvolatile acid =

Physiological category of acids

A nonvolatile acid (also known as a fixed acid or metabolic acid) is an acid produced in the body from sources other than carbon dioxide, and is not excreted by the lungs. They can be produced from an incomplete metabolism of carbohydrates, fats, and proteins. All acids produced in the body are nonvolatile except carbonic acid, which is the sole volatile acid. Common nonvolatile acids in humans are lactic acid, phosphoric acid, sulfuric acid, acetoacetic acid, and beta-hydroxybutyric acid. Humans produce about 1–1.5 mmoles of H^{+} per kilogram per day. Most nonvolatile acids are excreted by the kidneys. Lactic acid is usually completely metabolized by the body, and is thus not excreted from the body.

== Reactions ==
The following reactions result in nonvolatile acids:

- sulfur-containing amino acid oxidations:
  e.g. methionine or cysteine → urea + CO_{2} + H_{2}SO_{4} → 2H^{+} + SO^{2−}_{4}
- phosphorus-containing compound metabolism → H_{3}PO_{4} → H^{+} + H_{2}PO^{−}_{4}
- cationic amino acid oxidation:
  e.g. lysine or arginine → urea + CO_{2} + H_{2}O + H^{+}
- Non-metabolizable organic acid production:
  HA → H^{+} + A^{−}
- Incomplete metabolism of carbohydrates, fats, and proteins → e.g. lactic acid or keto-acids

== See also ==
- Carbonic acid
- Volatile acid
