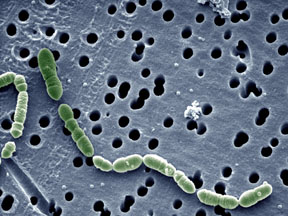

Scientific classification
- Domain: Bacteria
- Kingdom: Bacillati
- Phylum: Bacillota
- Class: Bacilli
- Order: Lactobacillales
- Family: Lactobacillaceae
- Genus: Oenococcus
- Species: O. oeni

Binomial name
- Oenococcus oeni (Garvie 1967) Dicks et al. 1995

Synonyms
- Leuconostoc oeni corrig. Garvie 1967 (Approved Lists 1980); Leuconostoc oenos Garvie 1967 (Approved Lists 1980)

= Oenococcus oeni =

Species of bacterium

Oenococcus oeni (known as Leuconostoc oeni until 1995) is a Gram-positive bacterial species in the genus of Oenococcus. It was the only species in the genus until 2006, when the species Oenococcus kitaharae was identified. As its name implies, Oe. oeni holds major importance in the field of oenology, where it is the primary bacterium involved in completing the malolactic fermentation.

== Diacetyl ==
Diacetyl

Diacetyl in wine is produced by lactic acid bacteria, mainly Oe. oeni. In low levels, it can impart positive nutty or caramel characters, but at levels above 5 mg/L, it creates an intense buttery or butterscotch flavour, where it is perceived as a flaw. The sensory threshold for the compound can vary depending on the levels of certain wine components, such as sulfur dioxide. It can be produced as a metabolite of citric acid when all of the malic acid has been consumed. Diacetyl rarely taints wine to levels where it becomes undrinkable.
