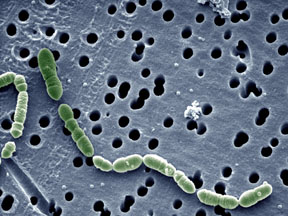

Scientific classification
- Domain: Bacteria
- Kingdom: Bacillati
- Phylum: Bacillota
- Class: Bacilli
- Order: Lactobacillales
- Family: Lactobacillaceae
- Genus: Oenococcus; Dicks et al. 1995

Type species
- Oenococcus oeni (Garvie 1967) Dicks et al. 1995

Species
- Oenococcus alcoholitolerans Badotti et al. 2015; "Candidatus Oenococcus aquikefiri" Verce et al. 2019; Oenococcus kitaharae Endo and Okada 2006; Oenococcus oeni (Garvie 1967) Dicks et al. 1995; "Oenococcus sicerae" Cousin et al. 2019

= Oenococcus =

Genus of bacteria

Oenococcus is a genus of gram-positive bacteria, placed within the family Lactobacillaceae. The only species in the genus was Oenococcus oeni (which was known as Leuconostoc oeni until 1995). In 2006, the species Oenococcus kitaharae was identified. Oenococcus oeni holds major importance in the field of oenology, where it is the primary bacterium involved in completing malolactic fermentation.
