= Red wine headache =

Headache often accompanied by nausea and flushing

Red wine headache (RWH) describes a headache, often accompanied by nausea and flushing, that occurs after consuming red wine by susceptible individuals. White wine headaches have been less commonly reported.

A 2025 review found insufficient evidence to indicate that consumption of red or white wine triggered migraine headaches.

== Speculative causes ==
=== Sulfites ===
Many wines contain a warning label about sulfites, and some people believe that sulfites are the cause of headaches and other allergic and pseudoallergic reactions. However, this may not be the case. Dried fruit and processed foods like lunch meat have more sulfites than red wine. Reactions to sulfites are not considered a "true allergy" and reactions more commonly occur in persons with asthma and may manifest themselves in difficulty breathing or skin reactions, rather than headache.

Some wines may be exempt from including a sulfite warning. Wines that have under 10mg/L of sulfites do not need to be labeled that they contain sulfites. This includes added and natural sulfites, like sulfites that come from the soil, or those produced by yeasts during alcoholic fermentation. Wines labeled "100% Organic", "Organic", "Made With Organic Grapes", "Made With Organic and Non-Organic Grapes" or without organic certification may contain sulfites, and must disclose this on the label. This also means that the so called "Natural" wine can also contain sulfites. Different rules might apply in different countries.

=== Histamine ===
Red wine intolerance is supposedly linked to histamine intolerance. Histamine, a biogenic amine involved in immune responses, gastric acid secretion, and neurotransmission, has been identified in varying concentrations in different types of wine. One study observed that red wine contained significantly higher levels of histamine compared to white wine. However, another study demonstrated that some red wines have minimal histamine content. For instance, an analysis of histamine levels in 100 varieties of Austrian red wines from the 2004 vintage revealed a significant variation in histamine concentrations. This inconsistency in histamine content among red wines, coupled with the lack of reproducibility of symptoms in patients, raises questions about the validity of the clinical diagnosis of headache as a histamine-induced adverse reaction following red wine consumption.

== See also ==
- Alcohol (drug)
- Alcohol flush reaction
- Browning in red wine
- Food intolerance
- Hangover
- Headache
- Wine and health
- Wine fault
- Potomania
