= Glossary of winemaking terms =

This glossary of winemaking terms lists some of terms and definitions involved in making wine, fruit wine, and mead.

== A ==
Acetaldehyde
The main aldehyde found in wines, most notably Sherry.
Acetic acid
One of the primary volatile acids in wine.
Acetification
The process through which acetic acid is produced in wine.
Acetobacter
A bacterium found in wine that causes acetification resulting in the conversion of wine to vinegar.
Acidity
The quality of wine that gives it its crispiness and vitality. A proper balance of acidity must be struck with the other elements of a wine, or else the wine may be said to be too sharp – having disproportionately high levels of acidity – or too flat – having disproportionately low levels of acidity. The three main acids found in wine are tartaric acid, malic acid and lactic acid. The first two come from the grapes and the third from Malolactic fermentation which often occurs in the winemaking process.
Active acidity
The concentration of acids in the wine. Used to gauge the "total acidity" in the wine. Measured using the pH scale.
Actual alcohol
The amount of ethanol present in wine, usually measured as a percent of total volume (ABV) taken at 20°C.
Aerobic conditions
Winemaking conditions that promote exposure to oxygen, such wine barrels kept partially full in order to oxidatively age the wine.

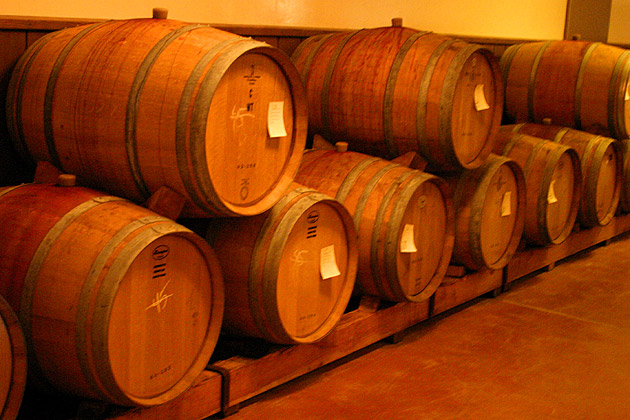
Aging barrels

Aging barrel
A barrel, often made of oak, used to age wine or distilled spirits.
Alcohol
Generally refers to ethanol, a chemical compound found in alcoholic beverages. It is also commonly used to refer to alcoholic beverages in general.
Alcoholic fermentation
The conversion by yeast of sugar into alcohol compounds.
Aldehyde
A component of wine that is formed during the oxidation of alcohol. It is midway between an acid and an alcohol.
Alternative wine closures
Various substitutes used in the wine industry for sealing wine bottles in place of traditional cork closures.
Amino acids
Protein found in wine grapes that are formed by fruit esters and consumed during the fermentation process and/or autolysis. They contribute to the sense of complexity in a wine.
Amphora
A type of ceramic vase, used for transporting and storing wine in ancient times.
Anaerobic
The opposite of aerobic, referring to a chemical process that takes place in the absence of oxygen. As a wine ages in a sealed wine bottle, it is going through anaerobic changes.
Analyzer
The first column in a Coffey still, outlawed for the production of Cognac but can be used in other regions for wine-based spirits, where the pre-heated wash is vaporized by steam.
Angel's share
The portion of a wine in an aging barrel that is lost to evaporation.
Anreicherung
German winemaking term for must enrichment
Anthocyanin
Phenolic pigments that give red wine its color.
Antioxidant
Chemicals, such as sulfur dioxide, that are used to prevent the grape must from oxidizing.
Aromatized wine
A wine that has been flavored with herbs, fruit, flowers and spices. Examples: Vermouth, Retsina or mulled wine.
Ascorbic acid
An antioxidant used to prevent grape must from oxidizing.
Aseptic
The characteristic of a chemical (like sulfur dioxide or sorbic acid) to kill unwanted or beneficial bacteria.
Assemblage
The blending of base wines in order to create a final blend or cuvee.
Atmosphere
The measure of atmospheric pressure within a wine bottle. The average internal pressure inside a bottle of sparkling wine is 6 atmospheres.
Autolysis
The breakdown of dead yeast cells (or lees) and the process through which desirable or undesirable traits maybe imparted to the wine. Wines that are deliberately aged sur lie such as Muscadet or some white Burgundies derive certain flavors and textures from this process.

== B ==
Back-Blend
Blending unfermented, fresh grape juice into a fully fermented wine in order to add sweetness. Synonymous with the German winemaking technique Sussreserve.
Barrel fermented
A wine fermented in oak barrels as opposed to stainless steel or concrete. Traditional with white Burgundies, some Chardonnays and some Champagne.
Barrique
French term for a 225 liter cask that is traditionally used in Bordeaux and now adopted worldwide.
Baumé
French measurement of the sugar concentration in the juice or wine.
Beeswing
A light sediment, chiefly mucilage, found in Port.
Bentonite
A type of clay of volcanic origins used in wine as a clarifying agent.
Blanc de Blancs
A white wine, usually sparkling, made exclusively from white grapes, often Chardonnay.
Blanc de Noirs
A white wine, usually sparkling, made from red grapes.
Blending
The mixing of two or more different parcels of wine together by winemakers to produce a consistent finished wine that is ready for bottling. Laws generally dictate what wines can be blended together, and what is subsequently printed on the wine label.
Blue fining
The use of potassium ferrocyanide to remove iron or copper casse from a wine.
Blush wine
A pale, pinkish color wine. It may refer to a sweet rosé such as White Zinfandel.
Bonne chauffe
The second distillation that takes place during Cognac production where the cloudy brouillis (first distillate with alcohol levels between 28 and 32%) gets converted into the clear eau de vie.
Botrytized grapes
Grapes that have been rotted by botrytis cinerea.
Botte (plural botti)
Italian term for a very large barrel that can hold up to 160 hectolitres (4,200 US gal).
Bottiglia
Italian term for a wine bottle.
Bottle Age
The length of time that wine has been allowed to age and mature in bottle.
Bottle shock
Also known as bottle-sickness, a temporary condition of wine characterized by muted or disjointed fruit flavors. It often occurs immediately after bottling or when wines (usually fragile wines) are shaken in travel. After several days the condition usually disappears.
Bottle variation
The degree to which bottled wine of the same style and vintage can vary.
Box wine
Wine packaged in a bag usually made of flexible plastic and protected by a box, usually made of cardboard. The bag is sealed by a simple plastic tap.
Brettanomyces
A wine spoilage yeast that produces taints in wine commonly described as barnyard or band-aids.
Brix/Balling
A measurement of the dissolved sucrose level in a wine.
Brouillis
The product of the first distillation in the production of Cognac.
Brut
A French term for a very dry Champagne or sparkling wine. Drier than extra dry.
Bung
A stopper used to seal a bottle or barrel. Commonly used term for corks.
Burnt wine
Another name for Brandy, a liquor made from distilled wine. It is often the source of additional alcohol in fortified wines.
Butt
An old English unit of wine casks, equivalent to about 477 liters (126 US gallons/105 imperial gallons). In Sherry production, a butt traditionally holds around 600 litres (160 US gal).

== C ==
Cap
The layer of grape skins that are forced by rising carbon dioxide gas to the top of the fermentation vessel during cuvaison.

Carbonic acid
Carbon dioxide gas dissolved in the water content of wine. It is a volatile acid that held in equilibrium with the dissolved carbon dioxide gas and can not be isolated in a pure form.

Carbonic gas
A natural by product of the fermentation process in which yeast cells convert sugar into nearly equal parts alcohol and carbonic gas. While a small amount stays presence in the wine as carbonic acid, most of the gas will rise to the surface of the fermentation vessel and attempt to escape into the air. If the fermentation vessel is closed (such as a sealed wine bottle used to make sparkling wine), the gas will dissolve into the wine and when released will make the wine sparkling.

Carbonic maceration
A winemaking practice of fermenting whole grapes that have not been crushed. This intracellular fermentation (as opposed to the traditional extracellular fermentation of wine yeast) tends to produce fruity, deeply colored red wines with low tannins.

Casein
A fining agent derived from a milk protein.

Cask
A wood barrel or storage vessel, often made from oak, that is used in winemaking for fermentation and/or aging.

Cask-strength
A term sometimes seen in Cognac production (but more often associated with grain spirits) to denote a Cognac that has not been watered down to reduce its alcohol level. Like whiskeys these Cognacs will usually be unfiltered and with a high alcohol proof over 40% ABV.

Casse
An unwanted haze in wine caused by various unstable compounds (such as proteins or excess copper from previous finings) that can develop into a wine fault if not corrected before bottling.

Charmat method
Sparkling wine production method where the secondary fermentation takes place in a tank as opposed to the traditional method where it takes place in the individual wine bottle that the consumer eventually purchases.

Chauffe-vin
An optional attachment to the Cognac still that heats the wine prior to the first distillation.

Cellaring
To age wine for the purpose of improvement or storage.

Centrifugal force filtration
The process of separating unwanted particles (such as dead yeast cells or fining agents) from the wine by use of centrifugal force.

Ceramic filtration
A filtration process of the wine that utilizes perlite and is able to fine the wine to an ultrafine degree.

Chaptalization
A winemaking process where sugar is added to the must to increase the alcohol content in the fermented wine. This is often done when grapes have not ripened adequately.

Charmat process
The Charmat or bulk process is a method where sparkling wines receive their secondary fermentation in large tanks, rather than individual bottles as seen in Méthode champenoise.

Clarification
A winemaking process involving the fining and filtration of wine to remove suspended solids and reduce turbidity.

Col de cygnet
The swan's neck shaped portion of a pot still used in Cognac production that transports the vapors from the pot to the condenser.

Cold stabilization
A winemaking process where wine is chilled to near freezing temperatures for several weeks to encourage the precipitation of tartrate crystals.

Compte
Classification system used in the Armagnac and Cognac region based on the age of the spirit ranging from 00 for a newly distilled spirit to 2 for a VS ("Very Special"), 4 for a VSOP Reserve, 6 for a Napoleon XO (extra old) and 10 for the longest aged XO. Congeners that are produced throughout the winemaking process from fermentation through maturation and even distillation for spirits such as a Cognac. These compounds include aldehydes, esters and ketones which can influence the aroma and flavor of wine.

Cork
A wine bottle stopper made from the thick outer bark of the cork oak tree.

Cork taint
A type of wine fault describing undesirable aromas and flavors in wine often attributed to mold growth on chlorine bleached corks.

Coupage
A custom of "enormous antiquity" of mixing a little good wine with much bad wine and calling it good. "The result of this operation is that the best qualities of the good are destroyed without a trace."

Courbe de fermentation
French term for plotting the temperature and must density/sugar levels of an individual vat or tank of fermenting must to track its progress from the initiation of fermentation to dryness.

Crossflow filtration
A highspeed form of microfiltration that has the wine flow across a membrane filter rather than through it.

Crown-cap
A beer bottle cap used as a temporary closure for a sparkling wine as it undergoes a secondary fermentation.

Crush
After harvest, and prior to pressing, grape are "crushed" or broken up so that the juice is released and allowed to macerate with the skins prior to and during fermentation. In viticultural terms, "Crush" is used as a synonym for harvest time.

Cryoextraction
A mechanical means of concentrating the grape must (and such increasing sugar concentration) by chilling the must until its water content freezes into ice crystals that are then removed. This production method is used to make so called "ice box wines" in a style similar to ice wines which are produced by the grapes naturally freezing on the vine before harvest.

Cut
A blending term used to refer to either blending a wine with one distinct characteristic (such as high acidity) into a wine that currently dominated by the opposite characteristic (such as low acidity). It can also mean blending a red wine with a white wine in order to make a rosé. Cutting may also refer to the illegal practice of diluting a wine with water. The French term tailles or "cut" refers to the point during pressing when the quality of the grape juices degrades. The first tailles is the free-run juice followed by successive pressing.

Cuve
A large vat used for fermentation.

Cuve Close
Alternative name for the Charmat method of sparkling wine production.

Cuvée
A wine blended from several vats or batches, or from a selected vat. Also used in Champagne to denote the juice from the first pressing of a batch of grapes.

== D ==
Debourbage
Refers to a process in which the must of a white wine is allowed to settle before racking off the wine, this process reduces the need for filtration or fining.
Dégorgement
The disgorging or removal of sediment from bottles that results from secondary fermentation.
Délestage
French term for racking with the purpose of removing harsh tannins from the wine in the form of grape seeds. In this process the wine is drained into a secondary vessel, allowing the cap to settle to a bottom and loosen the seeds that are trapped in the pulps. As the wine drains, a filter captures the seeds and removes them from the wine. The wine is then returned the first vessel.
Demi-muid
A large oak barrel that holds 159 gallons (600 liters). In between the petit foudre and the barrique.
Depth filtration
A means of filtering a wine that takes solely inside filtration medium, such as a kieselguhr, rotary drum vacuum or a frame filter.
Devatting
The process of separating red must from pomace, which can happen before or after fermentation.
Diatomaceous Earth
Very fine particles of sedimentary rock used for filtering wine. Also known as D.E. or Kieselgur.
Doble pasta
Spanish winemaking term describing a wine that is macerated with double the normal ratio of grape skins to juice. This is achieved by the winemaker bleeding off and disposing of extra juice in order to increase the ratio of grape skin and concentration of phenolic compounds.
Doppelstück
A German oak barrel that holds 635 U.S. gallons (2,400 liters).
Dosage (wine)
The addition of sugar with the liqueur d'expedition after degorgement where the sweetness level of a sparkling wine is determined.
Drawing off
see Devatting.
Dry
Wines with zero or very low levels of residual sugar. The opposite of sweet, except in sparkling wines, where dry means sweet.

== E ==
Egg white fining
A technique of fining that uses the whites of eggs to attract negatively charged matter.
Enology
American English spelling of oenology, the study of wine.
En Tirage
French for "in pulling", refers to the period of time in which bottled sparkling wine is rested in contact with lees generated during secondary fermentation. Part of the Méthode Champenoise process.
Enzyme
A protein created by yeast that act as a bio-chemical catalysts in grape or wine development. An example would be the enzyme invertase which aids the storage of sugars within individual grape berries.
Esters
Compounds formed in wine either during fermentation or the wine's aging development that contribute to a wine's aroma.
Estufagem
Portuguese term for the process where Madeira is heated in estufas (ovens) and then cooled to create the unique flavors and texture of the wine.
Ethanoic acid
Another name for acetic acid
Ethanol
Also known as "ethyl alcohol". The primary alcohol in wine and most other alcoholic beverages. The alcohol content of a wine contributes to its body.
Extract
Everything in a wine except for water, sugar, alcohol, and acidity, the term refers to the solid compounds such as tannins. High levels of extract results in more colour and body, which may be increased by prolonging the wine's contact with the skins during cuvaison.
Extra dry
A champagne or sparkling wine with a small amount of residual sugar (slightly sweet). Not as dry as Brut.

== F ==
Fall bright
The point when a wine becomes limpid, or clear, after all the cloudy sediments falls to the bottom of container. The wine is then usually racked over the sediment or, in the case of sparkling wine, disgorged.
Fatty acids
Another term used in winemaking to describe volatile acids such as butyric or propionic acids.
Fault
An unpleasant characteristic of wine resulting from a flaw with the winemaking process or storage conditions.
Feints
The "tails" of alcohol spirits leftover at the end of distillation in the production of Cognac. These are usually low in alcohol and may be re-distilled or blended with the "heart" (distillate with 70% ABV taken after the "heads" are produced) to add flavor to the Cognac.

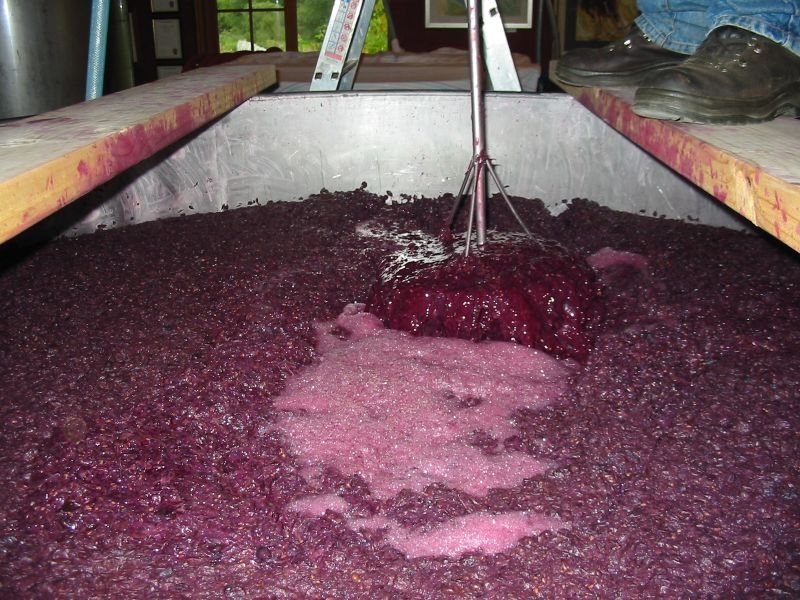
Vigorously fermenting red wine.

Fermentation
A chemical reaction in winemaking. In alcoholic fermentation it is the conversion of sugars to alcohol by yeast while in malolactic conversion it is the conversion of malic acid to lactic by bacteria.
Feuillette
A French wine barrel with the capacity to hold 30 US gallons/25 imperial gallons (114 liters) in Burgundy and 35 US gallons/29 imperial gallons (132 liters) in Chablis.
Filtration
The removal of unwanted particles suspended in wine or grape juice.
Fining
A clarification process where flocculants, such as bentonite or egg white, are added to the wine to remove suspended solids. Fining is considered a more gentle method of clarifying a wine than filtering.
First pressing
The first press, after the free run juice has been collected, that contains the clearest and cleanest juice that will come out of pressing.
Fixed acidity
A measurement of "total acidity" (TA), including tartaric, malic and lactic, of a wine minus the volatile acids.
Fixed sulfur
The molecules of sulfur dioxide that binds with sugar and acids in the wine. This leaves the unbound "free sulfur" to combine with molecules of oxygen in order to prevent oxidation.
Flash Pasteurization
A procedure different from full pasteurization where the wine is subjected to high temperatures around 176 °F (80 °C) for intervals of 30-60 seconds.
Flor
The yeast responsible for the character of dry Sherries.
Foreshots
The "heads" of alcohol spirit that are first released during distillation in the production of Cognac. These often include acetone, methanol and the lighter aldehydes and ester compounds with low boiling points and are usually discarded rather than added to the final blend of Cognac.
Fortification
The process of adding pure alcohol or very strong (77 to 98 proof) grape spirit to a wine. Depending on when the alcohol is added, either before, during or after fermentation, this can result in a wine with a high alcohol content and noticeable sweetness.
Foudre
A generic French term for a large wooden vat between 20 and 120 hectoliters.
Fractions
The separate parts that are released at different boiling points during the distillation process in the production of Cognac. These include the "heads", "heart" and "tails" with each fractions containing different alcohol levels and flavor compounds.
Free sulfur
The active element of sulfur dioxide that combined with molecules of oxygen to prevent oxidation. For more details see fixed sulfur above.
Free run juice
Juice obtained from grapes that have not been pressed.
Fruit wine
A fermented alcoholic beverage made from non-grape fruit juice which may or may not include the addition of sugar or honey. Fruit wines are always called "something" wines (e.g., plum wine), since the word wine alone is often legally defined as a beverage made only from grapes.
Fuder
A German oak barrel with the capacity to hold 265 US gallons/220 imperial gallons (1000 liters).
Fully fermented
A wine that was allowed to complete the process of fermentation without interruption to produce a wine that is completely dry.
Fusel alcohol
Also known as Fusel oils. By-products of fermentation and distillation that are encountered in small quantities in winemaking that can contribute to a wine's complexity. Yeast naturally produce propyl alcohol, isobutyl alcohol, isoamyl and amyl alcohol as fusel oils with the distillation process able to produce even larger long-chain hydrocarbons that can be potentially unpleasant tasting and toxic. These are usually found in the "tails" fraction of a distillate which is often discarded.
Fût
Generic French term for an oak cask where wines are fermented and/or aged.

== G ==
Gelatine
A fining agent used to remove excessive amounts of tannins and other negatively charged phenolic compounds from the wine.
Geosmin
A chemical compound found in wine grapes that is responsible for some earthy aromas and flavors. Geosmin is also found in beets and potatoes.
Governo
Winemaking technique historically associated with Chianti where a small amount of partially dried grapes are added to vat of wine that completed or stopped fermentation in order to restart fermentation, potentially adding more alcohol and glycerine to the wine.
Grape juice
The free-run or pressed juice from grapes. Unfermented grape juice is known as "must."
Gyropalette
A mechanized riddling palate that can complete the remuage process that would manually take several weeks over the course a few days.

== H ==
Heads
In Cognac production, this is the first fraction of alcohol spirit that is collected during the distillation process which includes volatile alcohol compounds, ethanol and potentially toxic alcohols such as methanol. This fraction is discarded.
Hearts
The second fraction that is collected during the distillation process in Cognac production that makes up the vast majority of the end product.
Halbfüder
A German oak barrel with the capacity of 132 U.S. gallons (500 liters).
Halbstück
A German oak barrel with the capacity of 159 U.S. gallons (600 liters).
Hogshead
A barrel whose capacity varies by region. A hogshead of wine in the US holds 63 US gallons (52 imperial gallons; 240 litres); a hogshead of wine in the UK holds 300 litres (66 imperial gallons; 79 US gallons).
Hydrogen sulfide
The combination of hydrogen and sulfur dioxide which can produce a fault in the wine reminiscent of the smell of rotting eggs that may eventually develop in the bottle into mercaptans.

== I ==
Isinglass
A clarifying agent which is a form of collagen derived from fish.

== J ==
Juice
A liquid which is expressed from a fruit or vegetable matter.

== K ==
Kieselgur
Another name for diatomaceous earth which is used in filtration.

== L ==
Lactic acid
The acid in wine formed during the process of malolactic fermentation.
Lagar
A traditional Portuguese concrete vessel used for treading grapes by foot.
Late disgorgement
A term, often abbreviated as LD on sparkling wine labels, that means the wine was recently disgorged after spending an extended period aging on its lees.
Leaching
A process of oak barrel production during which some tannins are deliberately removed from the wood by steaming. The viticultural term refers to the loss of certain qualities of the soil, such as pH, when rainwater removes or "leaches out" carbonates from the soil.
Lees
Wine sediment that occurs during and after fermentation, and consists of dead yeast, grape seeds, and other solids. Wine is separated from the lees by racking.
Lees stirring
Also known as bâttonage, A process associated with sur lie aging where the lees are stirred up to extract flavor and other sensory components into the wine and to avoid reductive conditions that may contribute to various wine faults.
Lieu dit
French term for a named vineyard site. Usually used for vineyards that do not separate have a Grand cru or Premier cru designation.
Liqueur de tirage
French term for a liquid containing saccharose and yeast used to effect the second fermentation in sparkling wine production.
Liqueur d'expedition
French term for "shipping liquid" or dosage, used to top up and possibly sweeten sparkling wine after disgorging. Usually a solution of saccharose in base wine.
Low wines
Also known as Brouillis, the cloudy, water-white alcoholic spirit of around 30% ABV that is derived from the first distillation of Cognac production.

== M ==
Maceration
The contact of grape skins with the must during fermentation, extracting phenolic compounds including tannins, anthocyanins, and aroma. See also cuvaison.
Madeirized
A wine showing Madeira-like flavor, generally evidence of oxidation. Sometimes used to describe white wine that has been kept long past its prime.
Maillard reactions
The complex chemical reaction between amino acids and sugar in the wine or grapes. During the raisining process of grapes, such as in the production of straw wine, the Maillard reaction process play a vital role in concentrating the flavors of the grapes. During sparkling wine production, the amino acids created during the autolysis process reacts with the residual sugar of the wine to create a series of aromas and flavors associated with premium quality Champagne.
Malic acid
A strong tasting acid in wine reminiscent of the flavor of green (unripe) apples. The amount of malic acid in grapes is gradually reduced during the ripening process while the grapes are on the vine and can be further reduced during winemaking by fermentation and malolactic fermentation.
Malolactic fermentation
Also known as malo or MLF, a secondary fermentation in wines by lactic acid bacteria during which tart tasting malic acid is converted to softer tasting lactic acid, during which carbon dioxide is generated.
Mannoprotein
A nitrogen rich protein secreted by dead yeast cells during the autolysis process that occur while the wine ages on its lees.
Marc
The distillate made from pomace. The term can also refer to the pomace itself or, in the Champagne region, to individual press fractions from the traditional vertical wine press.
Mead
A wine-like alcoholic beverage made of fermented honey and water rather than grape juice.
Membrane filtration
A process of filtration that uses a thin screen of biologically inert material, perforated with microsize pores that capture matter larger than the size of the holes.
Mercaptans
Chemical compounds formed by the reaction of ethyl and methyl alcohol with hydrogen sulfide to produce a wine fault that creates odors in the wine reminiscent of burnt rubber, garlic, onions or stale cabbage.
Méthode Champenoise
(aka Methode Traditionelle, Traditional Method) Process whereby sparkling wines receive a second fermentation in the same bottle that will be sold to a retail buyer. Compare with Charmat, transfer or bulk fermented methods.
Méthode Rurale
A method of sparkling wine production similar to the Champagne method except there is no secondary fermentation. Rather the wine bottled before the primary fermentation has completed, trapping the resulting carbon dioxide gas, and leaving the residual sediment in the wine.
Microoxygenation
The controlled exposure of wine to small amounts of oxygen in the attempt to reduce the length of time required for maturation.
Microvinification
A winemaking technique often used for experimental batches of wine where the wine is fermented in small, specialized vats.
Mise tardive
French term, literally "late bottling", for extended elevage with aging on lees.
Mistelle
French term for fresh grape juice that has had alcohol added to it (Fortification) before fermentation has started. This results in a generally sweet wine.
MOG
A winemaking abbreviation for "Material Other than Grapes". Usually refers to debris like leaves, dirt and stems that can be unintentionally harvested with the grapes.
Mosto cotto
Italian term for concentrated grape must used to add sweetness to a wine. Similar to the German term süssreserve.
Mud
See "Lees".
Muid
French term for a large oval barrel with a capacity of 159 U.S. gallons (600 liters).
Must
Unfermented grape juice, including pips (seeds), skins and stalks.
Must weight
The level of fermentable sugars in the must and the resultant alcohol content if all the sugar was converted to ethanol.
Mutage
French term for fortifying a wine by adding alcohol to the must either before fermentation (i.e. vin de liqueur) or during (i.e. vin doux naturel).

== O ==
Oak
The most commonly used wood source for fermentation vessel and barrel aging. Oak influence can also be imparted to a wine by the used of oak chips or staves.
Oechsle
A measure of must weight.
Oenology
The science of wine and winemaking.
Off-dry
A wine that has the barest hint of sweetness; a slightly sweet wine in which the residual sugar is barely perceptible.
Orange wine
A white wine with extending skin contact, similar to red wine production. The opposite of a rosé.
Organic winemaking
A style of winemaking using organically grown grapes and a minimum amount of chemical additives such as sulfur dioxide.
Osmotic pressure
The tendency of water of within two solutions separated by a semipermeable membrane to travel from a weaker solution to the more concentrated one to achieve equilibrium. In winemaking, osmotic pressure is observed in yeast cells added to grape must with a high sugar content. The water in the yeast cell escapes through the cell membrane into the solution causing the cell to experience plasmolysis, caving in on itself and dying.
Oxidation
The degradation of wine through exposure to oxygen. In some aspects oxygen plays a vital role in fermentation and through the aging process of wine. But excessive amounts of oxygen can produce wine faults.
OTR
Oxygen transmission rate. A factor of cork closures which shows some variation in their oxygen transmission rate, which translates to a degree of bottle variation.

== P ==
Pad filtration
A technique of filtering wine that involves running the wine through a series of pads made of asbestos, cellulose or thin paper sheet.
Passito
A method of straw wine production that involves drying bunches of grapes in a special room in order to dehydrate them and concentrate flavors. In some circumstances the grapes maybe left on the vine to dry out in a method similar to the French technique of passerillage.
Pasteurization
An umbrella term for various methods of sterilization and stabilization of the grape must.
Pectic enzyme
An enzyme added to fruit to increase juice yield. Also used as a clarifying agent in fruit wines when added to wine or must to eliminate pectin hazes.
Perlant
French term for a very lightly sparkling wine with less effervescence than a crémant or pétillant.
Perlite
A fine, powder-like substance of volcanic origins that is sometimes used for ceramic filtration. It has many of the same filtering properties as diatomaceous earth.
pH
A measure of the acidity. The lower the pH, the higher the acidity. The term pH is a shorthand for a mathematical approximation: in chemistry a small 'p' is sometimes used in place of writing log_{10} and the 'H' in pH represents [H^{+}], the concentration of hydrogen ions (usually termed 'hydronium ions' or 'protons').
Phenolic compounds
Compounds found in the seeds, skins and stalks of grapes that contribute vital characteristics to the color, texture and flavor of wine. Two of the most notable phenols in wine include anthocyanins which impart color and tannins which add texture and aging potential.
Pipe
A Portuguese oak barrel with the capacity of 145 U.S. gallons (550 liters).
Polishing
An ultrafine means of filtration usually done with kieselgur or perlite that leaves a wine with exceptionally bright clarity – giving the impression that it has been polished. Premium wines will often decline polishing because ultra fine precision can also remove flavor and phenolic compounds that may diminish the quality and aging potential of the wine.
Polyvinylpolypyrrolidone
A fining agent, more commonly abbreviated as PVPP, used in white wine production to remove compounds that can contribute to premature browning of the wine.
Pomace
The skins, stalks, and pips (seeds) that remain after making wine. Also called marc.
Post-disgorgement aging
The time a sparkling wine spend aging in the bottle between when it has been disgorged to when the bottle is opened for consumption.
Potable alcohol
Another term for ethanol or ethyl alcohol which is accounts for the majority of alcohol compounds found in wine.
Potassium sorbate
A wine stabilizer and preservative.
Potential alcohol
The calculation, based on brix, must weight and other measurements, of the potential finished alcohol levels if a batch of grape must was fermented to complete dryness.
Pot still
Distillation vessel, usually made of copper, used in the production of Cognac and other alcohol spirits. Usually a wash will be distilled twice with three fractions (heads, hearts and tails) coming from each distillation.
Pre-fermentation maceration
The time prior to fermentation that the grape must spends in contact with it skins. This technique may enhance some of the varietal characteristics of the wine and leech important phenolic compounds out from the skin. This process can be done either cold (also known as a "cold soak") or at warmer temperatures.
Proof
Refers to the alcohol content of a beverage. In the United States, proof represents twice the alcohol content as a percentage of volume. Thus, a 100 proof beverage is 50% alcohol by volume and a 150 proof beverage is 75% alcohol. In the Imperial system, proof, (or 100% proof), equals 57.06% ethanol by volume, or 48.24% by weight. Absolute or pure ethanol is 75.25 over proof, or 175.25 proof.
Protein haze
A condition in wines with an excessive amount of protein particles. These particles react with tannins to create a cloudy, hazy appearance in the wine. This condition is rectify with the use of a fining agent, such as bentonite, to remove the proteins.
Puncheon
An oak wine barrel with the capacity of 119 U.S. gallons (450 liters).
Pupitre
An A-frame rack used in the production of sparkling wine. The drilled holes in the boards allow sparkling wine bottles to go through the riddling process to slowly move the leftover sediment from secondary fermentation into the neck for removal.
Puttonyos
In Hungary, the measurement of sweetness levels for Tokaji ranging from 3 Puttonyos, which contains at least 60 grams/liter of sugar, to 6 Puttonyos containing at least 150 g/L of sugar.
Pyrazines
A group of aromatic compounds in grapes that contribute to some of the green herbaceous notes in wine from the green bell pepper notes in some Cabernet Sauvignon to the grassy notes of some Sauvignon blanc. In red wines, the abundance of pyrazines can be a sign that the grapes came from vines with vigorous leaf canopy that impeded the ripening process of the grapes.

== R ==
Racking
The process of drawing wine off the sediment, such as lees, after fermentation and moving it into another vessel.
Rancio
French and Spanish term for a fortified wine that has been madeirized, often by storage in oak barrels for at least two years often exposed to direct sunlight. Rancio wines are often found in the Roussillon region of France and in various Spanish regions.
Ratafia
A liqueur made by combining unfermented grape juice with a brandy made from the residue of seeds, skins and grape stalks left over from pressing.
Rectifier
The second column used in a patent still during the production of some wine-based spirits where the vapor from the analyzer containing the alcohol spirits is separated into fractions through a process of several "mini-distillations" taking place between segments of perforated plates.
Remontage
French term for the process of pulling out wine from underneath the cap of grape skins and then pumping it back over the cap in order to stimulate maceration.
Reserve cuvee
In sparkling wine production, these are the still wines kept over from previous vintages in order to blend with the product of a current vintage in order to improve quality or maintain a consistent house style with a non-vintage wine.
Remuage
See "riddling".
Residual sugar
The unfermented sugar left over in the wine after fermentation. All wines, including those labeled as "dry wines" contain some residual sugars due to the presence of unfermentable sugars in the grape must such as pentoses.
Reverse osmosis/RO
A process used to remove excess water or alcohol from wine.
Riddling
Also known as "Remuage" in French, part of the Méthode Champenoise process whereby bottles of sparkling wine are successively turned and gradually tilted upside down so that sediment settles into the necks of the bottles in preparation for degorgement.
Ripasso
An Italian method of winemaking that involves putting a wine through a secondary fermentation on the lees from a previously made recioto wine. This method is common in the Valpolicella area among Amarone producers who make a secondary Ripasso wine.

Rosé wines
Pink wines are produced by shortening the contact period of red wine juice with its skins, resulting in a light red colour. These wines are also made by blending a small amount of red wine with white wine.

== S ==
Saccharometer
A winemaking tool that uses specific gravity to measure the sugar content of grape juice.
Saignée
Pronounced "sahn yay" is the removal of grape juice from the "must" before primary fermentation to increase a wines skin/juice ratio. Typically done after 24 hrs of cold soak and prior to inoculation.
Screwcap
An alternative to cork for sealing wine bottles, comprising a metal cap that screws onto threads on the neck of a bottle. Also called a "Stelvin".
Sec
French for dry, except in the case of Champagne, where it means semi-sweet.
Secondary fermentation
Most commonly the term is used to refer to the continuation of fermentation in a second vessel – e.g. moving the wine from a stainless steel tank to an oak barrel. The Australian meaning of this term is malo lactic fermentation MLF, as distinct from primary fermentation, the conversion of sugar to alcohol.
Skin contact
Another term to describe maceration.
Solera system
A process used to systematically blend various vintages of Sherry.
Sorbic acid
An acid that can be added to wine in order to halt yeast activity and alcohol production – such as in the production of some sweet wines. If a wine goes through malolactic fermentation when there is a significant amount of sorbic acid present, the wine can develop a fault characterized by a strong odor of crushed geraniums.
Souped up
A wine that starts out as a lighter bodied and perhaps weaker flavor that is blended with a stronger, more robust wine.
Sparging
A process of adding carbonic gas to a wine just before bottling in order to add some slight effervescence to the wine.
Spinning cone column
Used to reduce the amount of alcohol in a wine.
Stabilization
The process of decreasing the volatility of a wine by removing particles that may cause unwanted chemical changes after the wine has been bottled. In winemaking wines are stabilized by fining, filtration, adding sulfur dioxide or techniques such as cold stabilization where tartrate chemicals are precipitated out.
Stabilizer
An additive such as potassium sorbate which is added to wines before they are sweetened. Unlike sulfites, these products do not stop fermentation by killing the yeast, rather they prevent re-fermentation by disrupting the reproductive cycle of yeast.
Stretching
Cutting or diluting a wine with water, often used to lower the alcohol level of the wine. In many wine regions this practice is illegal.
Still wine
Wine that is not sparkling wine.
Stoving wine
A production method of artificially mellowing wine by exposing it to heat.
Stück
A large German oak barrel with the capacity of 317 U.S. gallons (1,200 liters).
Stuck fermentation
A fermentation that has been halted due to yeast prematurely becoming dormant or dying. There are a variety of causes for a stuck fermentation including high fermentation temperatures, yeast nutrient deficiency, or an excessively high sugar content.
Sulfites
Compounds (typically: potassium metabisulfite or sodium metabisulfite) which are added to wine to prevent oxidation, microbial spoilage, and further fermentation by the yeast.
Sulphur dioxide
A substance used in winemaking as a preservative.
Sur lie
A winemaking practice that involves prolonged aging on the dead yeast cells (the lees).
Sur pointe
French term for a sparkling wine that has been aged with its neck down following the completion of autolysis but before dégorgement. Wines that are being riddled (remuge) will end up sur pointe with the yeast sediment consolidated in the neck of the bottle.
Süssreserve
A reserve of unfermented grape juice that is added to wines as a sweetening device.
Sweetness of wine
Defined by the level of residual sugar in the final liquid after the fermentation has ceased. However, how sweet the wine will actually taste is also controlled by factors such as the acidity and alcohol levels, the amount of tannin present, and whether the wine is sparkling.

== T ==
Tails
In the distillation process used in Cognac and Armagnac production, this is the third fraction that is collected from a pot still that usually contains a large number of less volatile compounds and alcohols, many of which are toxic with this fraction being discarded.
Tank method
Also known as the "Charmat" or "Cuve close" method where the secondary fermentation of sparkling wine production takes place under pressure within a sealed tank.
Tannin
Phenolic compound that give wine a bitter, dry, or puckery feeling in the mouth while also acting as a preservative/anti-oxidant and giving wine its structure. It is derived from the seeds (pips), skins and stalks of grapes.
Tartaric acid
The primary acid found in wine that is detectable only on the palate. Prior to veraison, the ratio of tartaric and malic acid in grapes are equal but as malic acid is metabolized and used up by the grapevine, the ratio of tartaric sharply increases.
Tartrates
Crystalline deposits of the tartaric acids that precipitate out of the wine over time or through exposure to cold temperatures such as the process of cold stabilization.
TCA
An abbreviation for trichloroanisole which is the prime cause of wines developing the wine fault of cork taint.
Terpene
A class of unsaturated hydrocarbons that are responsible for certain aromas that are characteristic of a grape variety such as the petrol notes of mature Riesling or the floral aromas of Muscats.
Téte de Cuvée
The juice that comes from the very first pressing of the grapes. After the free run juice, this is the highest quality juice with the best balance of phenols, sugars and acids.
Toast
The charring of the wine staves during cask manufacture or rejuvenation.
Tonneau
French cask capable of holding 900 litres (240 US gal) or the equivalent of 100 cases of twelve standard 750 mL (75 cL) bottles of wine.
Topping
The process of filling the headspace that is created inside a barrel through wine evaporation into the barrel wood.
Total acidity
The total amount of acidity (Tartaric, latic, malic, etc) in a wine as measured in grams per liter.
Traditional method
A method of sparkling wine production associated with the Champagne wine region where wine undergoes secondary fermentation in the exact bottle that will be eventually sold to the customer, in contrast to the Charmat method.
Transfer method
A method of sparkling wine production where a wine undergoes normal secondary fermentation in the bottle but then after the bottles are open, its contents transferred to a tank where they are filtered and then rebottled in small "splits" or large format size bottles. Also known as transvasage.
Triage
French term for the sorting of grapes after harvest but before crushing/pressing to remove less desirable bunches or MOG.
Tun
A wine cask that holds approximately, two butts, or 252 U.S. gallons.

== U ==
Ullage
Also known as headspace, the unfilled space in a wine bottle, barrel, or tank. Derived from the French ouillage, the terms "ullage space" and "on ullage" are sometimes used, and a bottle or barrel not entirely full may be described as "ullaged". It also refers to the practice of topping off a barrel with extra wine to prevent oxidation.

== V ==
Vacuum distillation
A means of removing water from grape must at a lower temperature than standard distillation/boiling which could also burn off the delicate flavors and aromas of wine. Within a vacuum, the pressure on the liquid is reduced allowing the must to boil at between 25 and 30 °C (77 and 86 °F) which can cause much less damage to the wine. In winemaking, this technique is sometimes used in vintages where late harvest rains has caused the grapes to swell with water, diluting the flavor and potential alcohol level of the wines.
VA lift
Winemaking technique where the volatile acidity of a wine is deliberately elevated in order to enhance the fruitiness of wines that are meant to be consumed young.
Vanillin
An aldehyde found naturally in oak that imparts a vanilla aroma in wine.
Varietal
A wine made from a single grape variety.
Véraison
French term (now English also) for the onset of ripening of the grape cluster.
Viertelstück
A German wine barrel with the capacity of 80 U.S. gallons (300 liters).
Vin de goutte
French term for free run juice.
Vin de liqueur
Fortified wine boltered with alcohol prior to fermentation.
Vin de paille
French for "straw wine", a dried grape wine.
Vin de rebèche
The juice that is still remaining the wine grapes during Champagne wine production after the second pressing has retrieved the taille fraction. By law this juice can not be used to make Champagne and is usually discarded or distilled.
Vin de presse
The dark, tannic wine produced from pressing the cap of grape skins.
Vin doux naturel
A fortified wine that has been fortified with alcohol during fermentation, for example Muscat de Beaumes de Venise.
Vin d'une nuit
A French rosé that spends only one night in contact with the red grape skins.
Vin gris
A light pale rosé.
Vinegar
A sour-tasting, highly acidic, liquid made from the oxidation of ethanol in wine, cider, beer, fermented fruit juice, or nearly any other liquid containing alcohol.
Viniculture
The art and science of making wine. Also called enology (or oenology). Not to be confused with viticulture.
Vinification
The process of making grape juice into wine.
Vin jaune
French for "yellow wine", a wine fermented and matured under a yeast film that protects it, similar to the flor in Sherry production.
Vinimatic
An enclosed fermentation tank with rotating blades that operates similar to a cement mixer with the propose of maximizing extraction during maceration and minimizing the potential for oxidation.
Volatile acidity
Acids that are detectable on both the nose and the palate. The level of fatty or volatile acids in a wine that are capable of evaporating at low temperatures. Acetic and carbonic acids are the most common volatile acids but butyric, formic and propionic acids can also be found in wine. Excessive amounts of VA are considered a wine fault.
Volatile phenols
Phenolic compounds found in wine that may contribute to off odors and flavors that are considered wine faults. The most common types of volatile phenols found in wine are ethyl and vinyl phenols. To a limited degree some volatile phenols may contribute pleasing aromas that add to a wine's complexity, such as ethyl-4-guaiacol which imparts a smokey-spicy aroma.

== W ==
Wash
In Cognac and Armagnac production, this is the alcoholic liquid that results from fermentation that is about be distilled.
Wine
An alcoholic beverage made from the fermentation of unmodified grape juice.
Wine cave
A large cave that is excavated to provide a cool location for storing and aging wine. Similar to wine cellar.
Wine cellar
A cool, dark location in which wine is stored, often for the purpose of ageing.
Wine fault
Undesirable characteristics in wine caused by poor winemaking techniques or storage conditions.
Winemaker
A person engaged in the occupation of making wine.
Wine-press
A device, comprising two vats or receptacles, one for trodding and bruising grapes, and the other for collecting the juice.
Winery
A building, property, or company that is involved in the production of wine.
Wood lactones
The various esters that a wine picks up from exposure to new oak. These lactones are responsible for the creamy and coconut aromas and flavors that develop in a wine.

== Y ==
YAN
Yeast assimilable nitrogen, a measurement of amino acids and ammonia compounds that can be used by wine yeast during fermentation.
Yeast
A microscopic unicellular fungi responsible for the conversion of sugars in must to alcohol. This process is known as alcoholic fermentation.
Yeast enzymes
The enzymes within yeast cells that each act as a catalyst for a specific activity during the fermentation process. There are at least 22 known enzymes that are active during fermentation of wine.

== Z ==
Zymology
The science of fermentation.

== See also ==
- Glossary of viticulture terms
- Glossary of wine terms
- Wine tasting descriptors
