= Bonificateur =

Additive for alcohol production

A bonificateur (from French, "improver", also known as typage or bouquetier) is a substance or mixture used in the production of alcohol drinks to improve its overall quality, flavor, and smoothness. The term is used in multiple production processes, including manufacturing of French Cognac, South African brandy, and German Weinbrand.

Bonificateurs can range from traditional additions of reserved, very old spirits used to add depth, to modern additives such as sugar (dosage), coloring, or flavoring extracts. Specific additives can include extracts from fruit (like prunes or plums), vanilla, or wood and nuts (like oak chips, green walnuts, and roasted almond shells).

== Definition and use ==
In Cognac production, a bonificateur is defined as a material, "typically small in volume and powerful in character," that is added during blending. Traditionally, this referred to reserved, extended-aged exemplar spirits added to give the final blend more depth and dimension. In a more liberal, modern application, the term also includes additives like dosage (sugar), boisé (wood extract), rancio, coloring, or flavoring agents. These can take the form of concentrated "teas" or extracts from items like dried fruit or vanilla beans, used to soften the spirit's character and improve its smoothness and flavor.

== Regional practices ==
=== German Weinbrand ===
In the production of German Weinbrand, the Typage is employed after the distillate has been diluted to drinking strength, with the goal of giving the final product a softer character and imitating the qualities of a long maturation in wooden casks. Under European Union law, Typage for Weinbrand may consist of an extract from oak wood chips, plums, green walnuts, and roasted almond shells. Caramel syrup and sugar coloring are also permitted to adjust the color.

EU regulations for spirits mandate that the total extract in the finished Weinbrand cannot exceed 20 g/l. The use of these rounding additives is not permitted in brandies made from grape berries, pomace, or yeast.

=== South African brandy ===
In South African brandy production, bonificateurs contained, per 1955 book, "prune extract or something of the kind". The same source described the use of bonificateurs (in moderation) as "almost universal in Europe", but noted it was less common in South Africa for producing the "'dry' type of Brandy".

== Sources ==
- Bosdari, C. De (1955). Wines of the Cape. A.A. Balkema.
- Grosch, Werner; Schieberle, Peter (2008). Lehrbuch der Lebensmittelchemie [Textbook of Food Chemistry] (in German) (6th, fully rev. ed.). Berlin: Springer. ISBN 978-3-540-73201-3.
- Campbell, Maggie (2021). "bonificateur". In Wondrich, David; Rothbaum, Noah (eds.). The Oxford Companion to Spirits and Cocktails. New York: Oxford University Press. ISBN 9780199311132.
