= Bosie =

Bosie may refer to:

- a googly, a type of delivery in the game of cricket
- a nickname for Lord Alfred Douglas, the lover of Oscar Wilde, addressed as such in Wilde's letter from prison, De Profundis

== See also ==
- Boise (disambiguation)
