= Sake kasu =

Cooking ingredient

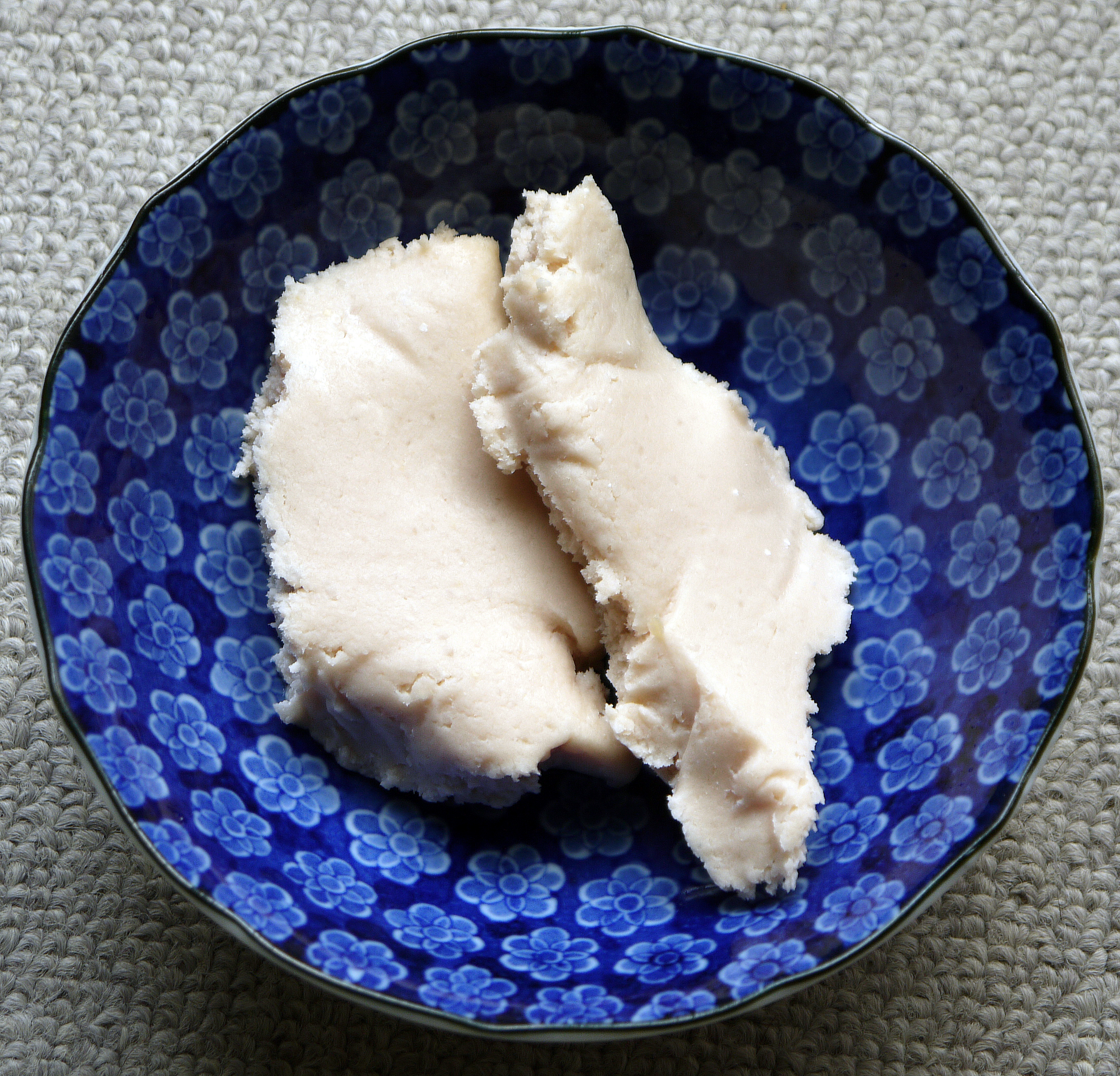
Sake kasu

Sake kasu (酒粕) or sake lees are the pressed lees left from the production of sake (Japanese rice wine). It is a white paste used in cooking. Its taste is fruity and similar to sake. A by-product of Japanese sake production, it typically contains 8% alcohol, has high nutritional value, and might have health benefits.

Sake kasu is used as a marinade for Japanese dishes based on fish, vegetables, and meat, and contributes an umami flavor to the dish. Sake kasu is also found in cosmetics and skincare products. Sake kasu is considered a part of the Japanese "no waste" culture since the waste of the sake production is used in various ways. Mirin, a type of sweet Japanese sake, can also produce kasu called mirin kasu. Similar to sake kasu, mirin kasu can also be used as a healthy food ingredient.

== Process ==
Sake kasu is created during the sake brewing process. When koji, a type of fungus used for sake brewing, is added to steamed rice, it releases amylase enzyme. This enzyme breaks down the rice starch, creating sugar. After that, yeast is added to the mixture, transforming the sugar into alcohol. Finally, the fermented rice mash is compressed and the sake is drawn out of the mash. The residue that remains behind from the process is called sake kasu. Sake brewer Todd Bellomy estimates that in his brewery, 250 liters of sake kasu are produced as a by-product of every 700 liters that of sake that they produce.

The weather conditions during rice growing can affect the production of sake kasu. In high temperatures, the starch inside the rice grain has a less soluble structure. This boosts the amount of sake kasu and reduces the taste of Japanese sake due to the reduction of the solubility of the rice. In contrast, when the weather is cooler, the rice grains are finer, and the solubility is higher. Thus, creating less sake kasu and the taste of Japanese sake will be stronger.

== Nutrition ==
Sake kasu is a highly nutritious by-product of sake providing protein, carbohydrates, fat, vitamins (including some B vitamins), fiber, ash, peptides, and amino acids.

It has also been found that sake kasu has the potential to reduce the risk of non-alcoholic fatty liver disease (NAFLD) and an extract has potential to be used as a treatment. According to a science television program, "Tameshite Gatten", that aired on NHK in Japan, it was explained that the fiber and resistant protein in sake kasu can reduce low-density lipoprotein cholesterol levels and amino acids.

Whether sake kasu is heat-dried or freeze-dried, there is little difference in nutritional value between the two drying methods. With heat-dried sake kasu there are more free amino acids, whereas the freeze-dried sake kasu contains more S-adenosyl methionine. The degradation of microbial metabolites during heat-drying sake kasu can cause an increase in the amount of nucleic acid-related components.

When feeding aging mice with sake kasu, the branched-chain amino acid level is high in different parts of the mice including the plasma, brain, and muscle. Based on the experiment, it is believed that consuming sake kasu may be beneficial towards the elderly in maintaining brain tissue and motor functions.

Fermented sake kasu is produced by introducing lactic acid bacteria to the sake kasu during the fermentation process. Consuming fermented sake kasu can suppress type I allergic reaction and allergic rhinitis-like symptoms. Therefore, it is believed that fermented sake kasu is beneficial against nasal allergies. This may also be a result of its potential to reduce symptoms of inflammation or swelling.

Consuming fermented sake kasu can also delay the occurrence of scratching behavior and pathogenesis in NC/Nga mice that are prone to atopic dermatitis.

== Food that uses Sake kasu ==
Sake kasu can commonly be found in Japanese food recipes since it has a distinct taste and also contains yeast and enzymes which can synergize with other food ingredients. Marinating food ingredients in sake kasu can increase the amount of inosine-monophosphate, which is one of the substances that contribute to the umami flavor of the dish.

=== Kasuzuke ===
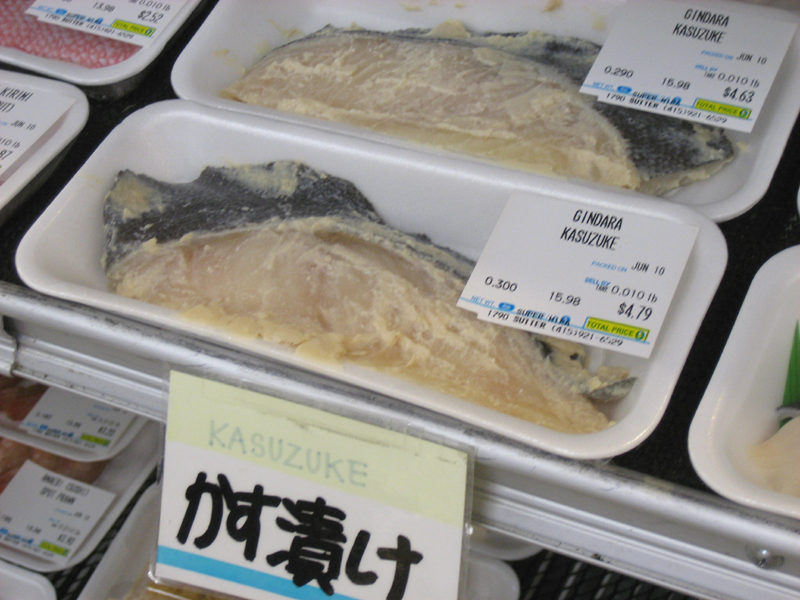
Fish Kasuzuke

Kasuzuke is a type of Japanese tsukemono pickling and marinating process that uses sake kasu as one of the main ingredients. Kasuzuke can be used to marinade different ingredients such as cucumber, daikon, salmon, or chicken The first step of creating Kasuzuke is to create a mixture that contains sake kasu, miso, mirin or sake, sugar, and salt. The ratio can be different for personal preference. Next, add the ingredients that into the mixture and allow the marinade to permeate the food. The Kasuzuke can be eaten raw or cooked depending on whether the ingredient added to the Kasuzuke requires cooking or not in order to consume safely.

=== Marinating swordfish ===
A traditional method marinating swordfish is to soak the swordfish into sake kasu. Normally, marinating food ingredients in sake kasu can increase the amount of inosine-monophosphate thus increasing the umami flavor of the dish. Soaking swordfish in sake kasu will decrease the amount of inosine-monophosphate in the swordfish and increase the level of inosine and the amount of inosine-monophosphate in the sake kasu marinade.

=== Kasujiru ===
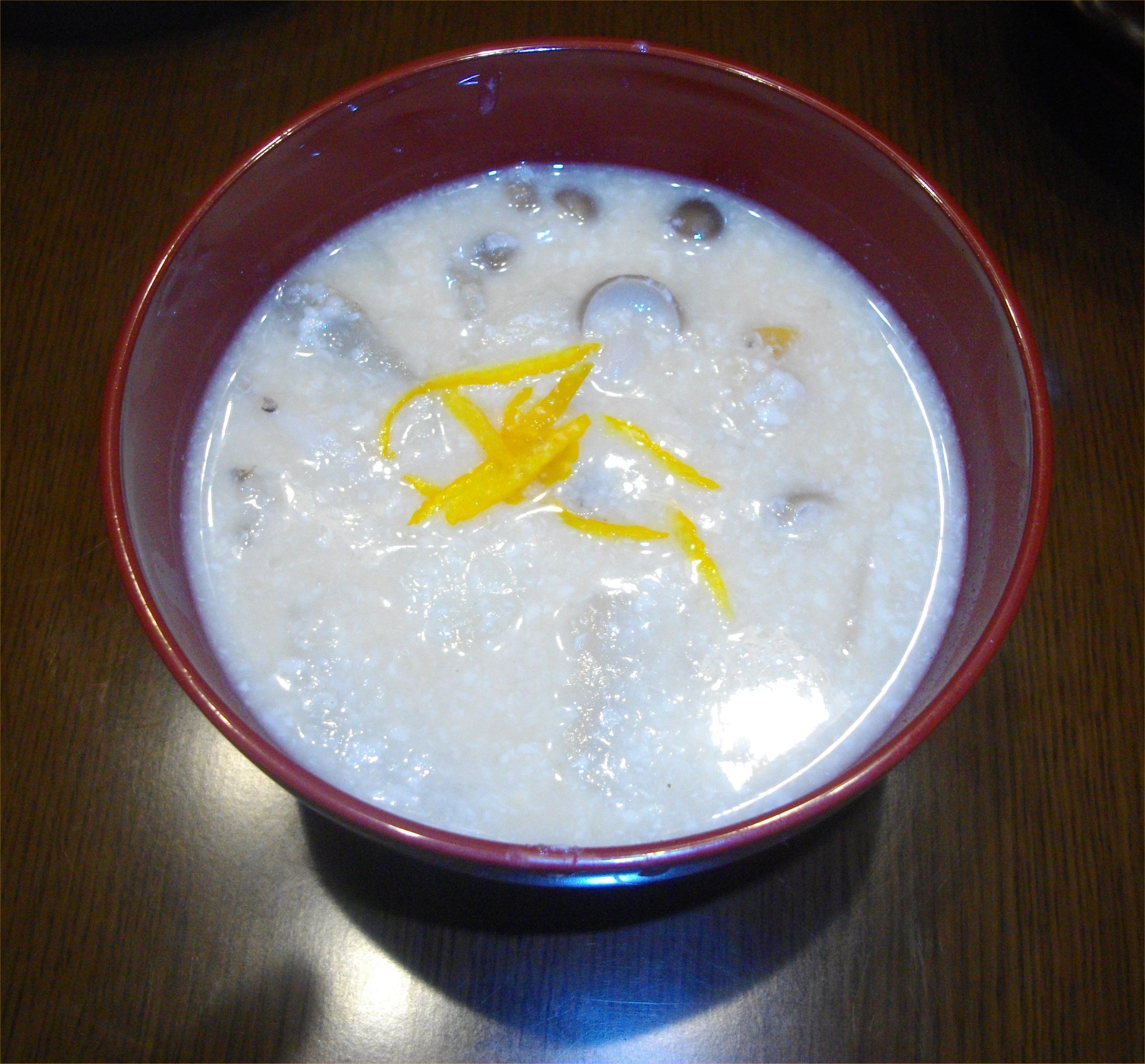
Kasujiru (a kind of Japanese soup made from sakekasu)

Kasujiru is a soup eaten typically during winter in Japan. Ingredients of kasujiru include sake kasu, different types of vegetables such as Japanese daikon radish, carrots, burdock, miso, salted salmon, and dashi stock.

=== Fermented dry sausage ===
Adding sake kasu when mixing the ingredients for fermented dry sausage can increase the speed of decomposition in both sarcoplasmic and myofibrillar proteins. It also can increase the amount of peptides and free amino acids, causing the fermented dry sausage to increase in hardness and acidity.

=== Other food that uses sake kasu ===
Sake kasu can be purchased in packages at grocery stores and supermarkets in Japan. Japanese home cooks use it as an ingredient to make food such as bread, cakes, and ice cream. In addition, Kasu senbei is a snack created by toasting a flatted piece of sake kasu on a grill. Sake kasu can also be used to make narazuke, which is a winter melon that has been heavily salted and marinated in sake kasu. It is a well-known local product in Nara Prefecture. Amazake is a traditional Japanese drink. The drink is sweet in flavor and has a creamy texture. There is a non-alcoholic and alcoholic version of the drink. The alcoholic version uses sake kasu as a main ingredient for the drink. The non-alcoholic version uses rice and rice koji as the main ingredient of the drink. Amazake that uses rice koji as one of the main ingredients is more nutritious than amazake that uses sake kasu as the main ingredient. The rice koji version of amazake contains nutrients including glucose, vitamin B1, B2 and B6, dietary fiber, glutamine, folic acid, and ferulic acid. The amazake that uses rice koji has also been called "IV drip to drink".

== Other use of sake kasu ==
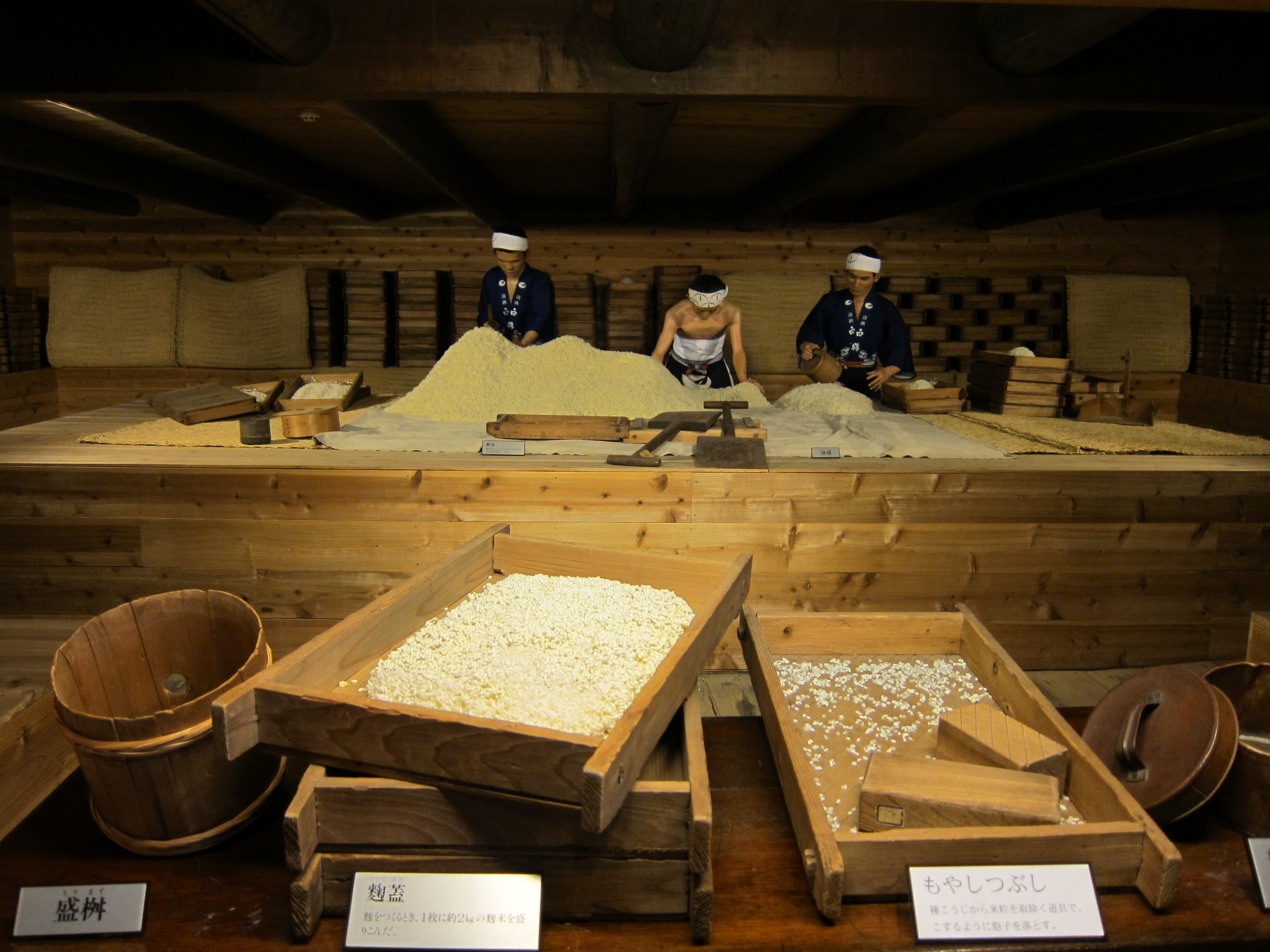
A model of sake brewing process

Sake kasu can be found in different cosmetics and skincare products such as facial masks, bath powder, and face cream. There is an old folktale about an elderly man who worked in a brewery with youthful-looking hands compare to his old wrinkled face; in light of this, different cosmetics companies use sake kasu as an ingredient and a selling point for their product.

A research scientist found an old sake brewer who had no wrinkles on his hands due to the constant contact with the yeast produced during the sake fermentation process. Other research focused on the yeast produced during the sake fermentation process leading to a product line called Pitera. Sake kasu can also be used as the main ingredient for homemade beauty products including sake kasu facial masks and body masks. Adding citrus fruit juice, honey, and rice water, aloe vera or rose water to sake kasu can create a mask for both face and body. It brightens the users' skin and the antioxidants in the mask can stimulate collagen production. Because sake kasu contains alcohol, it is recommended that sunscreen be applied before using the homemade sake kasu mask.

Sake kasu can be beneficial for cosmetic use due to the high amount of triacylglycerols found in freeze-dried sake kazu. Tyrosinase catalytic activity is hindered by the n-hexane extract from freeze-dried sake kasu. Tyrosinase inhibitor was further purified by the n-hexane extract from the freeze-dried sake kasu. This process then causes the n-hexane extract to create a mixture of triacylglycerols, with the property of tyrosinase inhibition. Therefore, sake kasu can be used as an anti-browning material. One of the elements in triacylglycerols called trilinolein is often found in cosmetic products. Based on users' experience, sake kasu can make the users' skin more moisturized and softer, the redness of acne and the color of age spots faded, and the pores are tightened.

== The "no waste" culture ==
Sake kasu can be considered as a part of the "no waste" culture in Japan. Sake kasu is the waste produced by sake production, and the Japanese decided to use it because they do not want to waste any of the ingredients. A lot of sake kasu is produced during sake production and a lot of sake kasu is considered as industrial waste and being discarded. In order to reduce the waste produced by the sake kasu in Japan, it is recycled for use in other products. Some breweries sell their sake kasu directly to restaurants or put it into packages sold in convenient stores and supermarkets.

== Mirin kasu ==
Mirin kasu is a by-product created when separating the mirin with the mixture that creates mirin during the brewing process. Mirin is a type of sweet Japanese sake that contains 14% alcohol. It is sweet, syrupy and used for seasoning, marinating, broth making, and glazing. Mirin kasu is mildly sweet compared to the taste of sake kasu. The use of mirin kasu can be traced back to the Edo Period in Japan as a "sweet confectionary". Mirin kasu can also be used as a food ingredient. It can be used as a marinade base for pickled vegetables, fish, and meat; and can also be used for bakery and drinks.

== Mirin kasu nutrition ==
Mirin kasu contains water, alcohol, fat, carbohydrate, and protein. A type of protein called resistant protein can be found in Mirin kasu. Resistant protein is beneficial to the consumers' health because it can improve immunity against lifestyle-related diseases including tumorigenesis, gallstone formation, corpulence hypercholesterolemia, constipation, and improving enteric fermentation of short-chain fatty acids.
