= Glossary of viticulture terms =

This glossary of viticultural terms list some of terms and definitions involved in growing grapes for use in winemaking.

== A ==
Absorption
The method that grapevines use in the uptake of nutrients by the roots in the soil.
Accolage
French term for tying vine branches (or cordons) to the horizontal trellising wires in a vine-training system
Adsorption
The method that grapevines use in the transport of certain nutrients through the plant by adhesion of ions or molecules on the surface of colloidal particles or other solid materials.
Adjuvants
Chemicals or other materials that are mixed with sprays aid in the penetration, wetting or spreading of the active ingredient in the viticultural spray.
Adventitious roots
Roots that develop in areas of the grapevine where there previously was no root system, such as the roots that develop from the nodes of a newly planted cutting. While grapevines have adventitious roots, they do not have adventitious buds and requiring pre-existing buds for future growth.
Alkali soil
Soils with high levels of sodium that will interfere with the growth and development of the grapevine.
American hybrid
A grape variety that, unlike French-American hybrids, was developed in North America. It is usually a crossing of North American grape varieties but some varieties do have Vitis vinifera in their parentage.
Ampelography
The science of identify grape varieties and tracing their history using both DNA and physical characteristics such as the appearance of clusters and leaves.
Anther
The part of the male-reproductive organs of the grapevine flower, located on the stamen, that contains the pollen needed for fertilization.
Anthesis
A stage during the flowering period of the grape vine when the calyptra has fallen off and the vine is in full bloom.
Anthocyanins
Polyphenols located in the skin of grapes that includes the color pigments that gives both grapes and wine their color.
Aoutement
French term for the period of ripening when the vine's shoot stop growing and the plant shifts its carbohydrate production into reserves as it prepares for dormancy and next year's growth. During this time the leaves may begin to change color as the shoots also change color, usually from a green to a brown wood color.
Apical dominance
The tendency of the central mid-section region of a grapevine shoot up to the apex to exhibit the most growth and development of foliage, tendrils and grape clusters. The apical dominance of the grapevine also inhibits the growth of lateral buds.
Apical meristem
The growth cells located at the tip of a grapevine shoot that have the ability to differentiate and continue to grow. Unlike other plants, grapevines do not have terminal buds that limit growth.
Appellation
A geographical based term to identify where the grapes for a wine were grown.
Aquifer
A geological landform that retains rain water drained from the surrounding area.
Aspect
A topographical feature of a vineyard including the angle and direction of a slope as well as its altitude.
Aspersion
Frost protection technique where overhead sprinklers are used to spray the grapevines with water, allowing the water to freeze and coat the young buds with ice at 0°C with the latent heat of freezing protecting them from damage from further temperature drops
Axil
The attachment point on a grapevine leaf of petiole where usually a developing bud will be located

== B ==
Balance pruning
A method of pruning based on the amount of growth that the vine experienced the previous growing season. This is often determined by weighing the one-year-old that is pruned during the winter dormancy period and using a formula to determine how many buds should be left for the next season's crop.
Bark
The dead tissue that makes up the hard, woody external covering of the grapevine canopy outside the cork cambium.
Basal bud
The small bud located at the base of a grapevine's cane or spur.
Bench
A natural terrace of flat land between two slopes.
Bilateral cordon training
A vine training system that utilizes two arms, or cordons, extending horizontally from the trunk in two different directions along support wires.
Biodynamic wine
Wines produced by the principles of biodynamic agriculture.
Black rot
A fungal disease that causes black stains to appear on grapevine leaves. Most prevalent in warm and wet conditions
Bleeding
The phenomenon of sap being expelled from an open pruning wound on the grapevine that often happens during early spring. This is often a sign of good health for the vine. Also known as weeping.
Bloom
The powdery, waxy substance that is often found on the surface of grapes. While this substance may contain the spores of wild yeast, it is not necessary composed of yeast cells.
Bordeaux mixture
An organic fungicide composed of copper sulfate and calcium hydroxide (lime) and water that was invented in Bordeaux in the late 19th century as a treatment against powdery and downy mildew
Botrytis cinerea
See Noble rot.
Bud
The undeveloped, primordial grape shoot that is usually located along nodes of a cane.
Bud scales
Hairy, scale-like leaves containing suberin that act as a protective cover over buds, often protecting them against the elements during the dormancy period of winter.
Bud sport
The shoot, fruit or flower offspring that arise from bud that has experienced a spontaneous genetic mutation in at least one gene in one of the buds cells. This offspring will be genetically different from the rest of the bud offspring on the plant and maybe the source of new clonal material.
Bush training
Vine training system where the vines are kept as individual, free-standing vines not supported by or joined together by a trellising system. Also known as Goblet training. Common training system in the Rhone Valley and in parts of California with old vine Zinfandel.
Buttage
French term for adding mounds of earth to the base of a newly grafted vine to cover the graft union between the rootstock and scion to protect from frost damage.

== C ==
Callus
The undifferentiated mass of tissue that grows over grafting or pruning wounds that protects the tissue from drying out or suffering further injury. In the case of grafting, the callus eventually hardens into the bulging graft union of the vine.
Calyptra
The petals of a grapevine flower that are fused together to form the "cap" which is shed during flowering.
Cambium
The layer of undifferentiated meristematic cells located just underneath the bark of the grapevine from which all other plant tissues, including the xylem and phloem, originate from.
Cane
The mature, brown and woody shoot of the grapevine after leaf fall.
Cane pruning
Pruning method where the one or two canes of 1 year old wood is left on the vine after winter pruning with between 8 and 15 buds
Canopy
The parts of the grape vine above ground, in particular the shoots and leaves.
Canopy management
A range of viticultural techniques applied in vineyards to manipulate the vine canopy. This is performed for vine shape, limiting direct sunlight and disease control, in order to create an optimal growing environment.
Carbonate
An ester or salt of carbonic acid that increases the alkalinity of the soil. Most commonly found in vineyards with chalky-limestone soils.
Chalk
Limestone based vineyard soil that is almost pure calcium-carbonate. Associated with several wine regions such as the Champagne wine region of France.
Chip-budding
A system of propagating vines by cutting the xylem and phloem of a vine bud into a tiny wedge shape and then inserting onto the rootstock of an existing root system.
Chlorosis
A viticultural disorder of the vine also known as "green sickness". It is caused by a mineral imbalance such as a deficiency in magnesium or iron.
Clay
Vineyard soil type made up of extremely fine-grained particles that can retain water, sometimes to excess, with usually low soil temperatures. Associated with several wine regions such as the Pomerol AOC located on the right bank of Bordeaux
Climat
French term for a designated vineyard site. Also known as a lieu-dit.
Clone
A vine that has developed differently from other vines of the same grape variety. The clone may have developed through natural selection by adapting to its environment or was artificially bred and developed in a control environment in order to advance favorable characteristics.
clonal selection
Propagation method where individual grapevines from a particular variety that have demonstrated desirable features (disease resistance, reliable yields, smaller berry size, etc) are selected for propagation. This is opposed to massal selection where several grapevines within a vineyard that have produced well are selected for propagation each generation.
Contact herbicide
Chemical herbicide which kills the portion of the plant that it comes into contact with.
Continentality
A summation of the difference between summer and winter temperatures during the growing season
Cordon
The outward extensions or "arms" of a grapevine extending from the trunk which carries the fruiting grape shoots or spurs.
Coulure
A physiological ailment afflicting the grapevine during bud break. If the vine is subjected to alternating conditions of dry/wet or hot/cold during this period, the vine begins to move sap past the embryonic grape clusters to the shoot-tips. This increases the foliage but at the expense of the grape cluster receiving vital nutrients that it needs to develop. The partially formed berries eventually dry up and drop to the ground.
Cross
A vine whose parentage is from grape varieties that belong to the same Vitis species such as Cabernet franc and Sauvignon blanc from the Vitis vinifera family crossing to produce Cabernet Sauvignon.
Crush
In the United States and Australia, Crush is the harvest period. In winemaking terms, it is the procedure that precedes pressing where the grapes are broken and the juice is allowed to macerate with the skin prior or during fermentation.
Cryptogamic
A fungas based grape disease also known as "gray rot".
Cultivar
A cultivated grape variety. Used mainly in South African viticulture.
Curtain
The portion of a grapevine's canopy that holds the current year's growth of fruit and foliage. Depending on the vine training system used, the current may be closed or split and oriented to grow upwards or downwards.

== D ==
Debourrement
The period during the grapevine's growing season between bud break and the first appearance of inflorescence flowers.
Débuttage
The removal of the mound of dirt added to the base of the vine to protect the graft union from frost danger
Degree day
A measurement based on the sum of the average daily temperature above 10 °C (50 °F) used to classify climates in wine growing regions. In California winemaking this is associated with the Winkler Scale.
Dendometer
A device used to measure the swelling and shrinkage of the trunk of the vine in response to irrigation/water use.
Dioecious
A grapevine that produces either male or female flowers. Many wild grapevines are dioecious while many domesticated vines used for wine production are hermaphroditic with flowers containing both the male staminate and female pistillate features.
Diurnal temperature variation
The degree of temperature variation that occurs in a wine region from daytime to night.
Dormancy
The period during a grapevine's growing season where there is no photosynthetic and very little metabolic activity going on. In grapevine this usually occurs after harvest and leaf fall when daily air temperatures stay below 50°F.
Downy mildew
Fungal infection of grapevines that can negatively impact photosynthesis by covering the leaves in a downy patches. Also known as Peronospora
Drip irrigation
A controlled system of irrigation where water is provided to the grape vine drip by drip in precise amounts by a system of pipes and metered valves. Modern vineyards equipped with sensor technology may have their irrigation pattern computerized with the amount of water being adjusted depending on the data received from the soil sensors.
Duplex soils
Vineyard soils that include two contrasting soil textures layered, one on top of the other. An example is the vineyards of Western Australia where coarse sand is commonly found over fine grained clay. Duplex soils are categorized based on the color of the sub soil.

== E ==
Emasculation
The removal of the male parts of a hermaphroditic grapevine flower in order to prevent self-pollination. This usually occurs in grape breeding when the breeder wishes to create a particular cross or hybrid grape variety by cross pollination.
Embryonic bunches
The miniature green berries that form in the spring time during the annual cycle of the grapevine. The bunches will eventually bloom during the flowering period and, if fertilized, will develop into fully formed grape clusters. The number of embryonic bunches can be an indicator of potential crop yields.
Eye
The compound bud of a grapevine.

== F ==
Fertilizer
A chemical or natural product (such as manure or compost) used to enrich the soil with one or more of the vital nutrients (nitrogen, phosphorus and potassium) needed for optimal vine development.
Field blend
A vineyard that is not planted homogeneously to a single grape variety but, rather, to several grape varieties growing interspersed among each other. In some cases, such as the Merlot and Carménère field blends widely found through Chile in the late 20th century, this is due to misidentification of both vines being the same variety. In other areas, such as the Sauternes field blends of Semillon and Sauvignon blanc, this may be intentional.
Flurbereinigung
German term for a viticultural technique of growing vines upon slopes in vertical, up and down, rows rather horizontally across terraces.
Foliar feed
A method of fertilization that involves spraying plant nutrients directly onto the foliage of the grape vine so that it is absorbed by the leaves rather than through the root system.
Friable
Soil structures that can be easily broken up or crumbly.
Fruit
The main component of the wine, usually grape but other fruits are also used to make wine, such as pear, plum, etc. Often mentioned when the fruit isn't grown in the same site as the winery, such as "the wine is produced here on-site, but the fruit is purchased from a vineyard upstate."

== G ==
Garrigue
The moorland terrain associated with the Languedoc and Provence regions of France. The wines of these areas will sometimes have a characteristic earthy garrigue aroma.
Genus
A botanical family. The grapes used for winemaking belong to Vitis genera.
Gout de Terroir
French term meaning "taste of earth" that denotes the characteristic flavors that certain vineyard soils impart on a wine.
Graft
The joint made during the grafting of rootstock to the scion of a vine.
Green harvest
The harvesting of green (unripe) grapes in an attempt to increase the yield of quality grapes.
Grey rot
The undesirable presence of Botrytis cinera, particularly in unripe or red wine grapes, that can cause poor coloration and various wine fault and off flavors in the resulting wine
Guyot
is a system of training and pruning of the vine that allows you to edit and enhance plant growth and fruit to fit the objectives for which it is grown.

== H ==
Head grafting
A grafting technique used in already established vineyard where a new grapevine (or even new grape variety) is grafted as a scion upon the rootstock of an already planted vine.
Heat summation
A measurement, usually expressed in "degree days", of the environmental conditions and suitability of an area for viticultural activity. The measurement is derived by a formula using the number of days in a year with daily temperature average above 50°F (10°C) and average daily temperature during that period.
Hectare
A metric measure that equals 10,000 m² (2.471 acres).
Herbicide
A concoction of chemical or organic chemicals used to control weed growth in the vineyard. Organic and Biodynamic viticulture discourages the use of chemical herbicides that may include toxins.
High density planting
A vineyard management plan that incorporates planting a high number of vines per acre/hectare in order to improve fruit quality. This is achieved by making more vines compete for a limited amount of resources, which subsequently reduces the yields of the individual vines. Smaller yields produce more concentrated flavors in the grapes.
Hybrid grapes
A grape variety derived from parent vines of two different species--such as Vitis vinifera and Vitis labrusca.

== I ==
Iron
An element found in vineyard soils with substantial ferrous deposits. Trace amounts are found grapes and the wines produced from those grapes though that amount can be lessen through fining. An excessive amount of iron can cause a wine to taste medicinal or become cloudy.
Irrigation
The supplementation of water in the vineyard either by drip-systems, overhead sprinklers or canals. While commonly used in New World wine regions, the practice was, until recently, banned in most wine-regions in the European Union

== L ==
Leaching
The loss of certain qualities of the soil, such as pH, when rainwater removes or "leaches out" carbonates from the soil. The winemaking term refers to a process of oak barrel production during which some tannins are deliberately removed from the wood by steaming.
Limestone
Vineyard soil type made up of sedimentary rock containing calcium carbonate which has desirable drainage and water-retention for grape growing. Limestone soils tend to produce grapes with high potential acidity levels due to inhibiting the vines from up-taking potassium ions that neutralize acids in the wine grapes.
Loess
Vineyard soil type composed of very fine, wind-blown particles of sand and silt that is noted for water-retaining properties.
Lutte raisonnée
A style of sustainable viticulture that, while not completely organic, aims to avoid the unnecessary use of synthetic chemicals

== M ==
Microclimate
The unique climate and geographical conditions of a designated area, such as a vineyard, within a large wine region.
Millerandage
A French term referring to a viticultural problem in which grape bunches contain berries of greatly differing size and levels of maturity. Caused by cool weather during flowering.

== N ==
Neutral grape varieties
White grape varieties that are relatively bland and not very aromatic on their own. These varieties are considered "neutral" because, unlike more aromatic varieties like Riesling and Muscat, these varieties can be enhanced by oak treatment or sur lie aging. Grape varieties that fall into this category include Aligote, Chardonnay, Melon de Bourgogne, Pinot blanc and Semillon.
Noble rot
Another name for the Botrytis cinerea mould that can pierce grape skins causing dehydration. The resulting grapes produce a highly prized sweet wine, generally dessert wine.

== O ==
Off vintage
A vintage that brought many challenges and adverse climatic conditions during the growing season such as lack of sunshine, rains and frosts.
Oidium
Also known as powdery mildew. A common name for Erysiphe necator, a fungal grape disease that forms whitish or greyish mycelium on leaves, stems and fruits.
Old vine
Wine produced from vines that are notably old.
Organic viticulture
A system of vine growing that doesn't use chemical fertilizers, herbicides and pesticides.

== P ==
Partial rootzone drying
A system of vineyard irrigation to where only a section of a vine's root system received measured amounts of water. The side not receiving the water will go through a mild water stress and starts diverting metabolic energy from the leaves to the grape cluster. The process alternates between irrigating the two sides in a manner that conserves water and improves grape quality. Sometimes abbreviated as "PRD".
Passerillage
French term for leaving grapes on the vine past normal harvest so that they dry up and concentrate their flavors. Passerillage is distinct from noble rot in that these grapes are not exposed to the botrytis fungus. The Italian equivalent is passito though in Italy the grapes maybe harvested to dehydrate off the vine in special rooms.
Peronospora
Another term for fungal disease downy mildew
Pesticide
A highly toxic concoction of chemicals used to eliminate pests in the vineyards such as flies, larvae, moths and spiders. In organic and biodynamic viticulture, the use of pesticides is prohibited.
Phenolic compounds
Compounds found in the seeds, skins and stalks of grapes that contribute vital characteristics to the color, texture and flavor of wine. Two of the most notable phenols in wine include anthocyanins which impart color and tannins which add texture and aging potential.
Photosynthesis
The vital system of plant life where sunlight energy is trapped by chlorophyll in the leaves and is converted in chemical energy (such as the sugar glucose) that is used throughout the grapevine.
Phylloxera
A minute (ca. 0.75 mm) underground insect that kills grape vines by attacking their roots.
Pip
Grape seeds.
Pourriture noble
French term for noble rot.
Powdery mildew
Also known as Oidium. Fungal infection that attacks the leaves and grapes of vines, appearing as a powdery white dust, that will ultimately cause the grapes to split and be vulnerable to other infections
Precision viticulture
The cultivation of grapes using an approach that applies appropriate vineyard management practices according to variation in environmental factors (soil, topography, microclimate, etc.). Typically the approach uses technological tools (GPS, GIS, remote sensing, etc.) to measure local variation, and manages different vineyard areas accordingly to maximize yield and quality, while minimizing risk and environmental impact.
Producer vine
In the case of grafted vines, the producer vine is the above ground vine stock that determined the grape variety. Since the phylloxera epidemic, many vines had American Vitis labrusca rootstock onto Vitis vinifera producer vine stock such as Merlot. The resulting plant is identified by the producer vine.
Pruning
The removal of unwanted or unneeded parts of the grapevines. In winter this usually involved removing the canes and wood that is less is less than year old, leaving on the necessary buds or spur desired for next year's production
Pyrazines
A group of aromatic compounds in grapes that contribute to some of the green herbaceous notes in wine from the green bell pepper notes in some Cabernet Sauvignon to the grassy notes of some Sauvignon blanc. In red wines, the abundance of pyrazines can be a sign that the grapes came from vines with vigorous leaf canopy that impeded the ripening process of the grapes.

== R ==
Refractometer
A device used to measure the sugar content of grapes.
Ripeness
The point when a grape has achieved a sufficient balance of sugars and acids. In recent years there has been an emphasis on developing the physiological ripeness of phenolic compounds in the grape such as tannin. Unlike sugar/acid ripeness, "physiological ripeness" does not lend itself to a straight scale of measurement but rather is a complex concept that is not yet fully understood.
Ripe acidity
Grapes with a high proportion of fruity and fresh tasting tartaric acid in contrast to the harsher tasting malic acid.
Rootstock
The lower part of a grafted vine that consists of the root structure of the plant. Since the phylloxera epidemic of the 19th century, emphasis has been on using phylloxera resistant rootstock but rootstock selection can also control vigor and yields.

== S ==
Scion
Another term for producer vine. This the part of the vine, usually Vitis vinifera, that is grafted on the rootstock and from which wine grapes will be harvested from
Site climate
Another term for the meso-climate of a particular site, block or plot of vineyard land
Solumology
The study and science of soils. In viticulture, solumological research goes into studying the relationship between certain grape varieties and various vineyard soil types.
Sprout
Young springly shoot
Spur
The one-year old wood of a grapevine that is pruned back to leave just one or two buds to be used for next year's crop of grapes
Systemic fungicide
A chemical application that is used to combat fungal infections by spraying the chemical on the vine and allowing it to be absorbed by plant tissue and transported through the xylem system. This is in contrast to a contact fungicide which works only on the surface of grapevine in spaces where the fungus comes into contact with the fungicide.

== T ==
T budding
A technique that permits grafting of different grape varieties onto existing rootstocks in a vineyard.
Taille
French term for pruning
Teinturier
A class of grape varieties that have red, colored juice inside of the more common clear or grayish color grape juice. Example Alicante Bouschet.
Terroir
French for "soil", the physical and geographical characteristics of a particular vineyard site that give the resultant wine its unique properties.
Trellis
A man-made support system used in vine-training where shoots and cordons of grapevines are held along wires attached to posts
Trie
Plural of Tri. A French term meaning a "sweep" or tries through the vineyard picking grapes. In the harvesting of botrytized grapes, a team will go through the vineyard several times (several tries) over a couple weeks picking only the individual grapes that have been sufficiently rotted.

== V ==
Vara y pulgar
Loosely translated as "thumb and stick". Vine training system used in the Jerez region of Spain for Sherry wine grapes. This involves pruning the vine to two branches with one short "thumb" branch that only has a couple buds and one long "stick" branch with around 8 buds that alternate each year between which side is the "thumb" and which is the "stick". This system was developed to lessen the stress on the vine in the hot heat of the Jerez region and high yield expectations needed for the production of Sherry
Veraison
The stage in the annual growth cycle of a grapevine where the grapes ripen and change color.
Vigor
The growth potential of a grapevine's canopy. To ripen fully a grapevine needs to produce around 8 square inches (50 square centimeters) of leaf surface for every gram of fruit. A vine that is too vigorous will produce an excessive amount of foliage that will impart an herbaceous character to the resulting wine.
Vine
A plant on which grapes grow.
Vine density
The number of vines per a define area of land (acres, hectare, etc). This can be influenced by many factors including appellation law, the availability of water and soil fertility and the need for mechanization in the vineyard. In many wine regions vine density will vary from 3000 to 10000 vines per hectare
Vine training
Technique aimed to assist in canopy management
Vineyard
A place where grape vines are grown for wine making purposes.
Vintage
The year in which a particular wine's grapes were harvested. When a vintage year is indicated on a label, it signifies that all the grapes used to make the wine in the bottle were harvested in that year.
Viticulture
The cultivation of grapes. Not to be confused with viniculture.
Vitis labrusca
A breed of grapes native to North America.
Vitis vinifera
A breed of grapes native to Europe.

== W ==
Watershed
An area from which water drains into a large body of water such as a river or a lake.
Winkler scale
A scale of measurement to evaluate a region's heat summation.

== Y ==
Yield
In any farming capacity, the quantity of quality fruit that a parcel of land render after a harvest. In terms of wine making it is the quantity of grapes that a vineyard can produce per hectare (2.47 acres) of land to produce the level of quality desired.

== Z ==
Zinfandel

== See also ==
- Glossary of wine terms
- Glossary of winemaking terms
- List of viticulturists
- Wine tasting descriptors
- GIESCO International Group of international Experts of vitivinicultural Systems for Co-Operation
