= Boise (disambiguation) =

Boise is the capital city of the U.S. state of Idaho.

Boise may also refer to:

== Places in the United States ==
- Boise, Texas
- Boise, Portland, Oregon
- Boise City, Oklahoma
- Boise County, Idaho
- Boise National Forest, a US national forest north and east of the city of Boise, Idaho
- Boise River

== Ships ==
- Boise (CL-47), a light cruiser commissioned in 1938
- Boise (SSN-764), a Los Angeles-class nuclear attack submarine

== People with the surname ==
- Reuben P. Boise (1819–1907), former chief justice of the Oregon Supreme Court
- Charles Watson Boise (1884–1964), mining engineer and a sponsor of Louis Leakey

== Other ==
- Boise, an unlockable costume in Pizza Tower
- Boise Cascade, a pulp and paper products company
- Boisé, a wood extract
