= Secondary fermentation =

Secondary fermentation may refer to:

- Secondary fermentation (wine) - a second fermentation in wine-making
- Secondary fermentation (beer) - a second fermentation in brewing beer
