= Boisé =

Oak extract additive for spirits

Boisé (b-w-az-AY) is a wood extract, typically from oak, used as a legal additive (bonificateur) in the production of aged spirits, most notably brandy. It is used to intensify or mimic the character of barrel aging, often to accelerate the aging process, as well as to add color and tannins to "round" and "shape" the final product.

The use of boisé is a traditional and legally controlled practice in French Cognac production. In the United States, it is classified as a "harmless coloring, flavoring, or blending material" and is authorized for use in brandy without label disclosure, provided it does not exceed 2.5 percent by volume of the finished product.

== Production and composition ==
Boisé is produced by boiling oak chips in water to create a thick, dark liquid, which can then be mixed with eau-de-vie and liquid sugar. It can also be made as an infusion that is "fortified with spirits" after being gently boiled, evaporated, and concentrated. While French and American oak are common, other woods and even "bitter galls" have been used.

The process of making boisé is often secretive. Distiller Hubert Germain-Robin described it as "a special place where you don't visit. It's not known."

The extract itself is often aged. While new boisé may be used for cheaper brandies, a "good boisé is thirty, forty years or more." Germain-Robin noted a preference for extracts aged at least fifteen years, which can be blended to achieve different characteristics, similar to blending different brandies.

== History ==
While a "liquid oak extract" was reportedly patented by Antoine Descoffre in 1902 in the Cognac region, the use of boisé and similar treatments is much older. In its "earliest incarnations, boise was simply chips from barrels." Records suggest practices such as adding oak pieces to barrels date back to at least the mid-19th century.

== Purpose and controversy ==
The purpose of boisé is to "enhance brandy aroma and flavor" and accelerate aging. It can mirror many traditional aromas of oak aging, such as "vanilla, caramel, butterscotch, clove, [and] allspice."

Discussion around its use is "charged," with some producers considering it essential and others believing it is "dishonest." The counterargument to its use is that boisé can only duplicate raw oak aromas and is unable to replicate the complex oxidative process that defines true barrel aging. For example, true rancio is not considered to be wholly duplicated by boisé.

== Legal status ==
=== France ===
Boisé is a common and legally defined component in all French brandies. French law, re-established in 1990 based on 1921 regulations, dictates that a "gentle water extraction" of oak chips is legal. However, a "more robust alcohol or brandy extraction is not," though this remains a point of contention as EU rules may allow it.

=== United States ===
In 1991, the U.S. Bureau of Alcohol, Tobacco and Firearms (ATF) issued a final rule (T.D. ATF-292) authorizing the use of "an oak chip infusion (Boise)" in Cognac brandy sold in the US without requiring it to be disclosed on the label.

The ATF classified the infusion as a "harmless coloring, flavoring, or blending material," similar to caramel and sugar, which may be added without changing the product's class or type "if the infusion does not total more than 2.5 percent by volume of the finished product." The agency's justification for not requiring disclosure was that "the infusion of oak chips does not contribute any character (i.e., flavor, aroma) to the finished product."

== See also ==
- Oak (wine)
- Rancio

== Sources ==
- Frost, Doug (2021). "boisé". In Wondrich, David; Rothbaum, Noah (eds.). The Oxford Companion to Spirits and Cocktails. New York: Oxford University Press. p. 97. ISBN 9780199311132.
- Rowley, Matthew (2015-10-01). Lost Recipes of Prohibition: Notes from a Bootlegger's Manual. The Countryman Press. p. PT143. ISBN 978-1-58157-635-1.
- United States Congress, Senate Committee on Agriculture, Nutrition, and Forestry (1991). Futures Trading Practices Act of 1991--S. 207: Hearings Before the Committee... U.S. Government Printing Office. p. 128. ISBN 978-0-16-035699-5.
