= Ullage (wine) =

Winemaking term

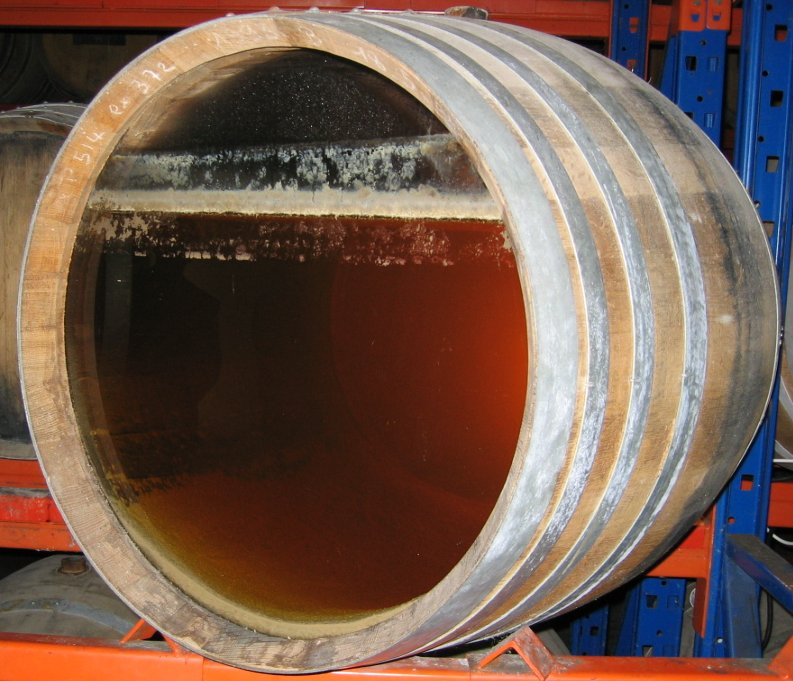
Ullage is the headspace of air between the wine and the top of the container (such as this barrel).

Ullage (from the French ouillage) is a winemaking term that has several meanings but most commonly refers to the headspace of air between wine and the top of the container holding the wine. It can also refer to the process of evaporation that creates the headspace itself or it can be used as a past tense verb to describe a wine barrel or bottle that has gone through the evaporation process (to be ullaged, etc.). The headspace of air is a mixture mostly of alcohol and water vapors with carbon dioxide that is a by-product of the fermentation process. In containers that are not completely air-tight (such as an oak wine barrel or a cork-stoppered wine bottle), oxygen can also seep into this space. While some oxygen is beneficial to the aging process of wine, excessive amounts can lead to oxidation and other various wine faults. This is why wine in the barrels is regularly "topped up" and refilled to the top with wine in order to minimize the head space. In the bottle, the ullage or "fill level" of the wine can be an important indicator of the kind of care and storage conditions that the wine was kept in. After-market resellers and wine auction houses will often inspect the ullage levels of older vintages to determine the potential quality and value of wine.

== In the barrel ==
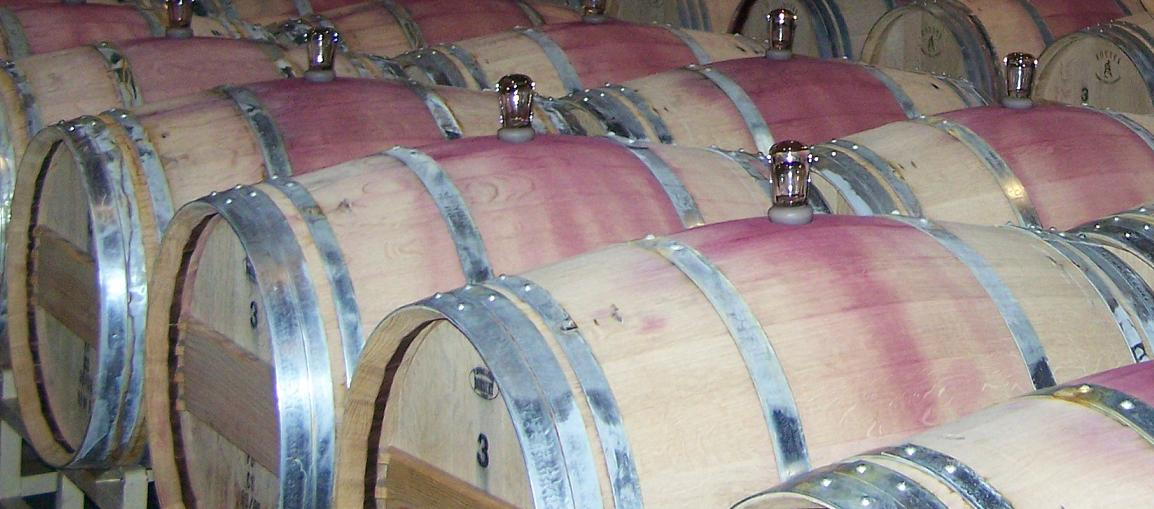
The "red band" seen on many wine barrels is from wine spill. Some of this spillage comes from the topping off process when the bung is reinserted into the barrel.

At the winery, the natural process of evaporation creates ullage in the barrel by causing some of the alcohol and water particles to escape as vapors, a loss sometimes referred to as the "angel's share". If the wine is in a container that is not completely air-tight, these vapor molecules (along with carbon dioxide) will diffuse out of the container through openings in the wood and around the bung and be replaced with oxygen molecules. While some oxygen is beneficial in the maturation and break-down of some phenolic compounds such as tannin, excessive amounts of oxygen can interact with Acetobacter present in the wine and start the process of turning the wine into vinegar. To prevent this possible oxidation and spoilage wineries will regularly "top up" the barrels by replacing the lost liquid with new wine.

The exact method and timing of topping up a wine barrel is determined by the individual wineries and can depend on the type of wine or grape variety that is being produced. A barrel can be topped off anywhere from once a week to every month and a half. The position of the barrel can affect the speed and degree of evaporation and the need for topping up. If the barrel is sitting with its bung hole on top, aeration and evaporation occurs more quickly. If the barrel is turned to the side in the bung over position, the bung is kept moist with the wine and aeration occurs at a slower pace. The wine that is replaced during the topping up is usually the same wine taken from another smaller container (such as a carboy) with the barrel filled to the very top to where the reinsertion of the bung causes some spillage.

== In the bottle ==
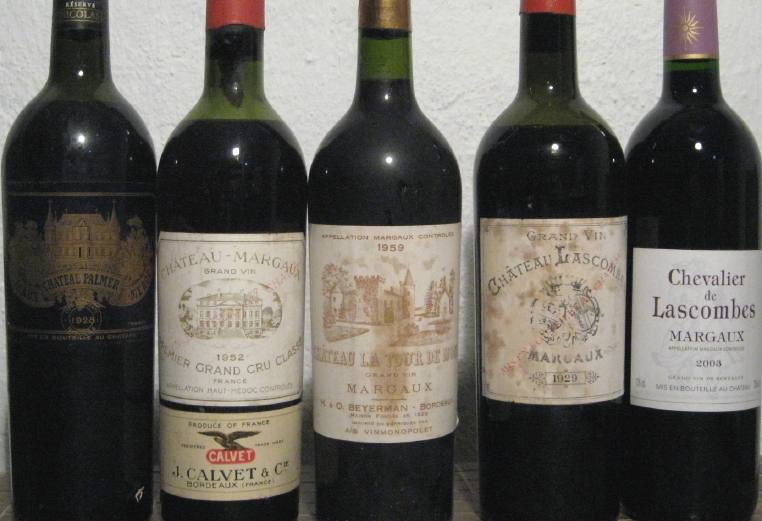
An assortment of aged Bordeaux wine with various ullage levels

The ullage level of a wine bottle is sometimes described as the "fill level". This describes the space between the wine and the bottom of the cork. During the bottling process, most wineries strive to have an initial ullage level of between 0.2–0.4 inches (5–10mm). As a cork is not a completely airtight sealant, some wine is lost through the process of evaporation and diffusion. As a wine ages in the bottle, the amount of ullage will continue to increase unless a wine is opened, topped up and recorked. If the wine is stored on its side, in contact with the cork, some wine will also be lost by absorption into the cork with longer corks having the potential to absorb more wine (and thus create more ullage) than shorter corks.

Generally the greater the amount of ullage, the more potential that the wine has been exposed to harmful levels of oxidation. This is why auction houses and retailers of mature wines pay close attention to the ullage levels in determining the resale value of the wine. The ullage level can also give insight as to the type of care and storage condition that the wine was kept in. Wines that have been kept at ambient humidity levels and in temperatures between 50–59 °F (10–15 °C) will experience evaporation and diffusion at a slower rate than wine kept in lesser conditions and will thus have a lower ullage levels. Ullage levels are generally important to the likelihood of almost any wine being in good shape. Vintage Port might be slightly less prone to damage since it is fortified, but the only wines that can not be damaged by oxidation are Madeira wines, which are already oxidized.

There are standard descriptions used by wine merchants and auction houses for the fill levels (ullage levels) of wine. The fill levels descriptions are different for Bordeaux and Burgundy wines due to the different shape of the bottles from those two regions.

=== Broadbent's ullage guide ===
Commonly used terms for ullage of Bordeaux bottles (Capsule line appears to indicate depth of cork.)

In the late 1980s, Master of Wine and senior consultant of Christie's auction Michael Broadbent developed a guide for evaluating the ullage levels of matured wines. While the focus of his guide was primarily on Bordeaux, it has been generally accepted and widely used in the wine market as an evaluation tool for all sorts of wine. The terms are used to describe the levels of wine in a wine bottle. They are commonly used to describe old wine bottles offered for sale in wine auctions and by dealers in rare wine. Due to the guide's popularity, Broadbent has been quoted as regretting his decision not to copyright it.

Ullage level (in/cm)	Appearance	Assessment
0.12 in (0.3 cm)	High up to the cork	Normal level for young wines
0.2 in (0.5 cm)	High in neck	Good condition for any age
0.6 in (1.5 cm)	Top of the shoulders	Normal for older wines. Good condition for wines over 15 years
1 in (2.5 cm)	Upper part of shoulders	Generally okay in older wines, especially those over 20 years
1.18–1.38 in (3–3.5 cm)	Mid to mid-low shoulders	Possible oxidation. Price should reflect the risk.
2.36–2.75 in (6–7 cm)	Low shoulders to below shoulders	Extremely risky. Possibly undrinkable
