= Autolysis (alcohol fermentation) =

Chemical reactions in wines

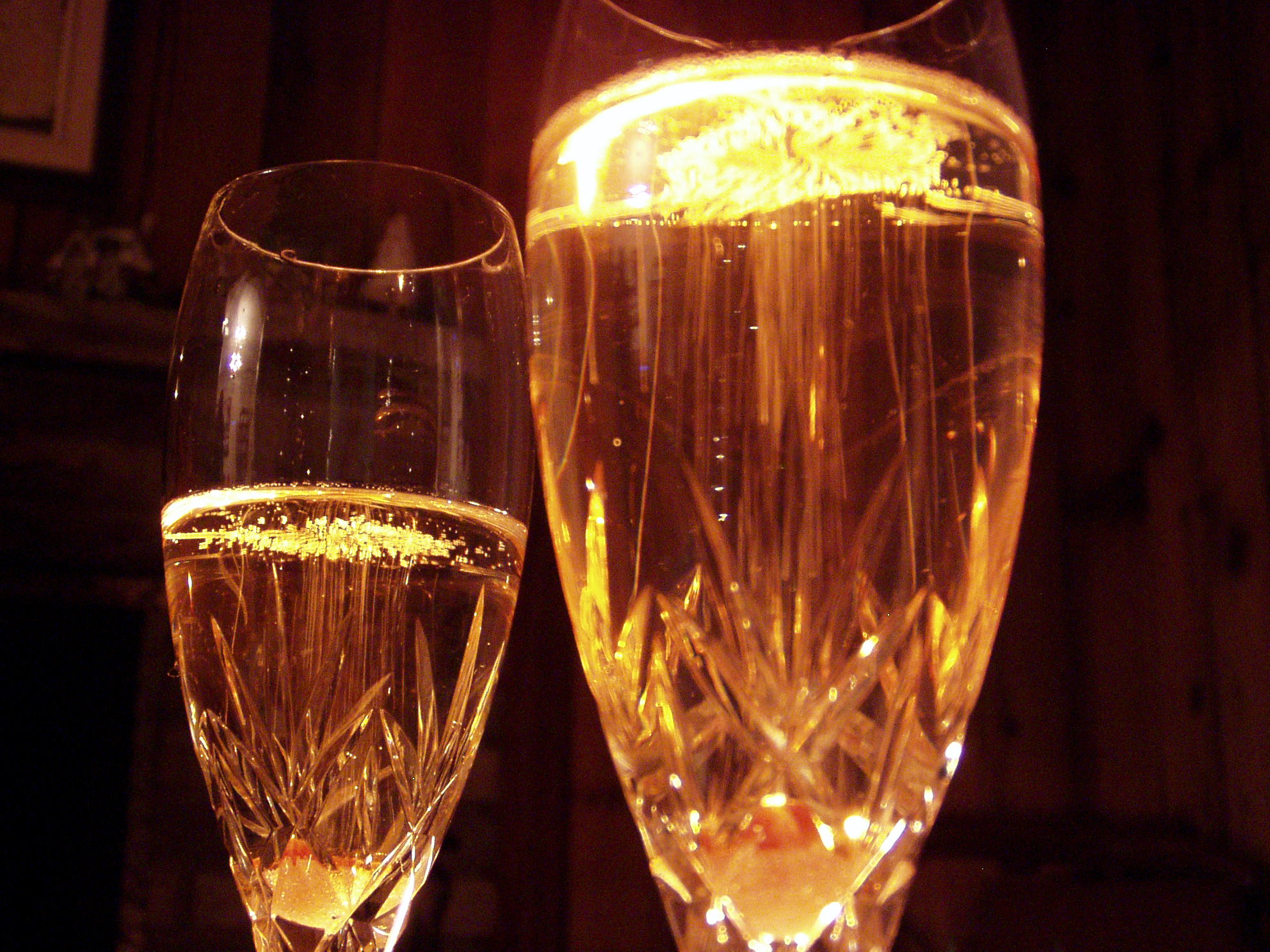
Many of the flavors associated with premium Champagne are influenced by the autolysis of the lees during winemaking.

Autolysis in winemaking relates to the complex chemical reactions that take place when a wine spends time in contact with the lees, or dead yeast cells, after fermentation. While for some wines - and all beers - autolysis is undesirable, it is a vital component in shaping the flavors and mouth feel associated with premium Champagne production. The practice of leaving a wine to age on its lees (or sur lie aging) has a long history in winemaking dating back to Roman winemaking. The chemical process and details of autolysis were not originally understood scientifically, but the positive effects such as a creamy mouthfeel, breadlike and floral aromas, and reduced astringency were noticed early in the history of wine.

== History ==
Ancient Roman writers, such as Marcus Porcius Cato, observed that wine that was left on its lees (or sediment as they knew it) exhibited different characteristics than wine that was quickly separated from its sediment. While the Romans did not understand the full chemical process or details behind the autolysis that took place, they were able to perceive the results of this autolysis in the creamy mouthfeel, reduced astringency and unique flavors and aromas that developed. With modern day understanding of autolysis, winemaking in the Champagne have strict regulation regarding the time Champagne must spend in contact with its lees in order to receive some benefit from autolysis. Under Appellation d'origine contrôlée (AOC) regulations, wines from Champagne cannot legally be sold until it has gone through autolysis in the bottle for at least 15 months with non-vintage Champagne. Vintage Champagne must have a minimum of 3 years aging; some Champagne houses extend the time for autolysis to 7 years or more.

== Process ==
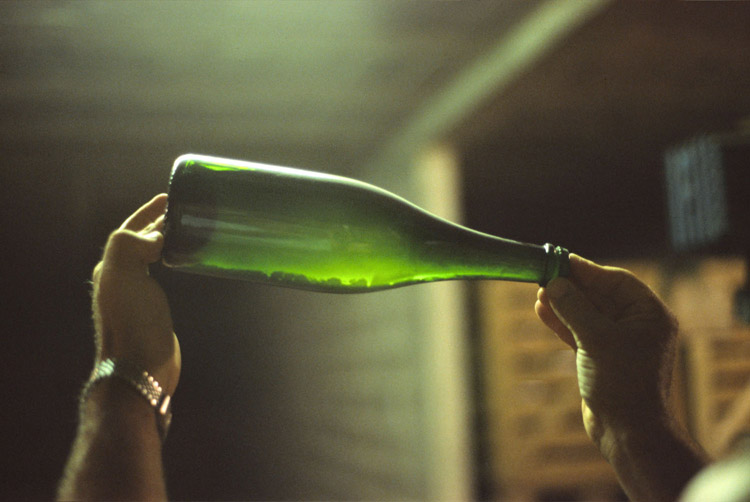
As the Champagne ages on its lees (pictured inside bottle) the process of autolysis causes the release of mannoproteins and polysaccharides that influence the flavor of the wine.

During fermentation, yeast cells convert the sugar in the grape must into ethanol. When the sugar food source for the yeast and necessary nutrients such as nitrogen run out, or the alcohol level of the wine reaches such a point to where it is toxic for the yeast, the cells die and sink to the bottom of the fermentation vessel. These dead cells, or "lees", are normally removed by racking the wine into a clean vessel. If the wine is left in contact with the lees, enzymes start to break the cells down producing mannoproteins (mannose-containing glycoproteins) and polysaccharides that are released into the wine. In sparkling wine production, a wine is made "sparkling" or "bubbly" because a secondary fermentation is introduced when the wine is contained within a sealed wine bottle. During this time the wine is deliberately kept in contact with its lees inside the bottle for a period ranging from a couple of months to several years. Studies have shown that the chemical reaction of autolysis, and its impact on the wine, starts to become noticeable after 18 months and will continue to impart traits for at least 5 years. The sparkling wine is eventually separated from its lees through a technique known as riddling and disgorgement.

== Influences on the wine ==
The effects of autolysis on wine contributes to a creamy mouthfeel that may make a wine seem to have a fuller body. The release of enzymes inhibits oxidation which improves some of the aging potential of the wine. The mannoproteins improve the overall stability of the proteins in the wine by reducing the amount of tartrates that are precipitated out. They may also bind with the tannins in the wine to reduce the perception of bitterness or astringency in the wine. The increased production of amino acids leads to the develop of several flavors associated with premium Champagne including aromas of biscuits or bread dough, nuttiness and acacia. As the wine ages further, more complex notes may develop from the effects of autolysis.

=== Potential faults ===
If not properly managed, wine faults can potentially develop from autolysis. If the layer of lees begins to exceed 4 inches (10 centimeters), the enzymes released from the process of the yeast digesting themselves creates reducing conditions and promotes the development of hydrogen sulfide and mercaptan odors. The process of stirring the lees or bâttonage can help prevent a thick layer of lees forming and promote a smoother autolysis. Poor hygiene of the winemaking equipment or wine made from grapes that had residue from fungicide can create off odors smelling of sulfide.

== See also ==
- Light Lees Protocol
