= Dryness (taste) =

Property of beverages

Dryness is a property of beverages that describes the lack of a sweet taste. This may be due to a lack of sugars, the presence of some other taste that masks sweetness, or an underabundance of simple carbohydrates that can be converted to sugar by enzymes in the mouth (amylase in particular). The term "dry" may be applied to types of beer, wine, cider, distilled spirits, or any other beverage.

In a dry martini, "dry" originally referred to the inclusion of dry gin, however it is often incorrectly used to refer to the amount of vermouth used in the drink. A "perfect" martini – or any other cocktail that uses vermouth, such as a Perfect Manhattan – is a martini made with equal parts dry and sweet vermouth.
