= Nc/Nga mice model =

Nc/Nga is an inbred mouse model bred in Japan at Nagoya University in 1957. It is used as a human atopic dermatitis model for its biological properties.

If kept under so called conventional conditions these mice develop skin lesions clinically and histologically very similar to human atopic dermatitis. The hair of these mice is rougher—especially on the head and dorsal skin. Erythema, haemorrhage, excoriation, erosion, scaling, and dryness are observed almost everywhere on the body—mainly on the face and ears. These symptoms do not develop if these mice are kept under specific pathogen free (SPF) conditions. This supports the theory that atopic dermatitis development is influenced by both genetic predisposition and environment. The production of serum IgE is several times higher in mice kept under conventional condition than in those from SPF conditions. High level of serum IgE is typical for human dermatitis too.

The lesional skin shows hyperkeratosis in the epidermis. Another trade mark is heavy cell infiltrate in the dermis. This infiltrate consists mainly of Cd4-positive t-lymphocytes with less Cd8-positive t-lymphocytes and macrophages. Infiltration of these cells leads to higher activation of mast cells. Higher production of certain chemokines, cytokines, and respective receptors is also typical. Notably production of TARC (thymus- and activation-regulated chemokine) is significantly higher. This chemokine plays an important role in lesion pathogenesis. Cells infiltrating dermis produce cytokines typical for Th2 polarization especially IL-4 and IL-5. Considering receptors, CCR3 and CCR5 are expressed in both lesional and nonlesional skin but CCR5 is higher in lesional skin. CCR4 is receptor typically expressed in lesional skin only. CCR4 is a receptor for TARC. These differences in chemokines and cytokines production are observed only in Nc/Nga mice kept under conventional conditions.

Genetic determinant responsible for atopic dermatitis-like skin lesions is located on chromosome 9. This quantitative trait loci (QTL) was named derm1 and is surrounded by seven genes possibly involved in atopic dermatitis onset and pathogenesis. These seven candidate genes are:

- thymus cell antigen 1 theta (Thy1)

- CD3 antigen delta, epsilon and gamma polypeptide (Cd3d,e,g)

- interleukin-10 receptor alpha (Il10ra)

- interleukin-18

- C-terminal Src kinase (Csk).br>

All these genes or their products more precisely are involved in T lymphocytes development.

Derm1 region is conserved on human chromosome 11q22.2-23.3 and 15q21-25. Nevertheless, no gene directly involved in atopic dermatitis development was located into this locus in humans.
