= Canopy (grape) =

Grapevine structure above ground

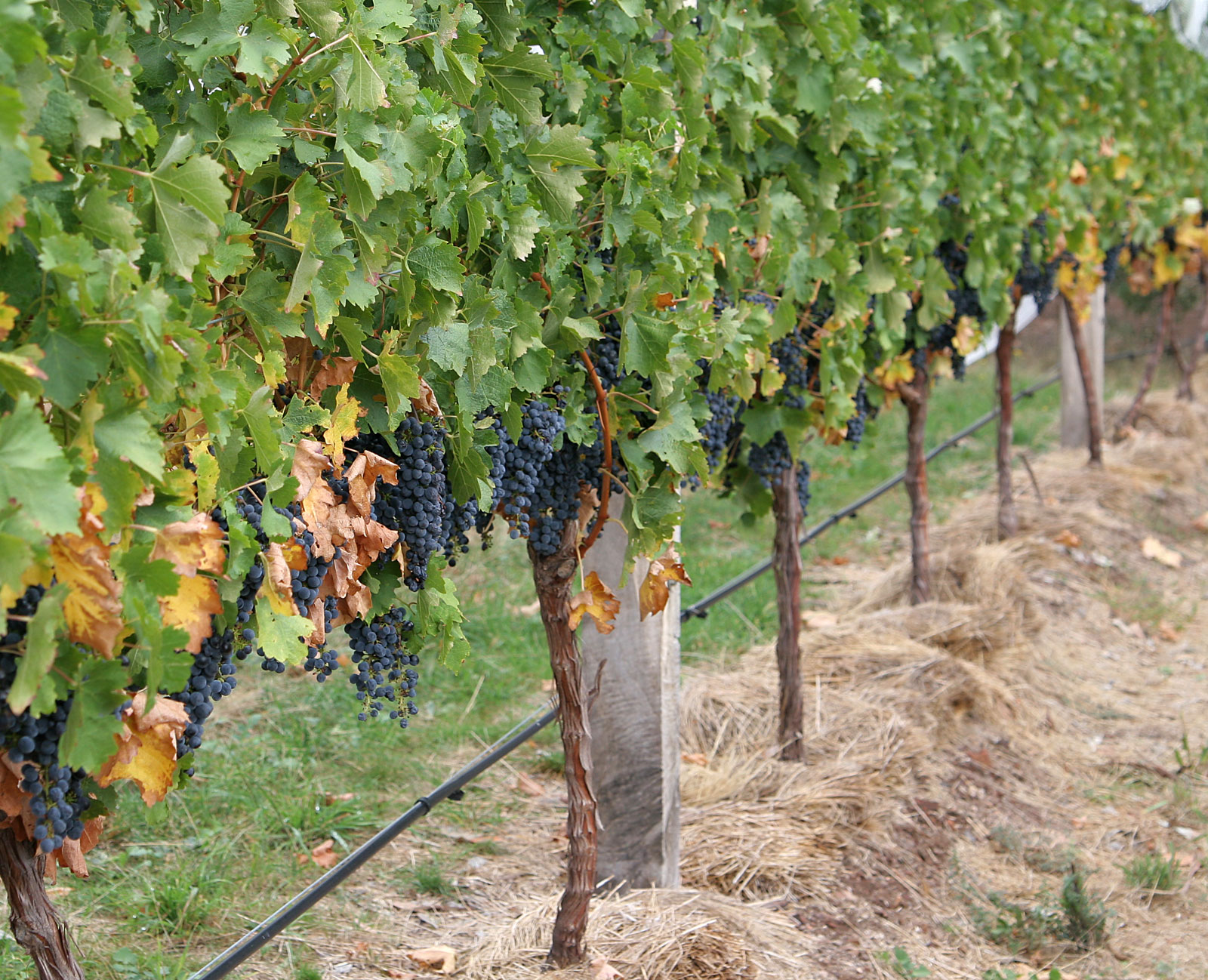
Grape vines and their canopies

In viticulture, the canopy of a grapevine includes the parts of the vine visible aboveground - the trunk, cordon, stems, leaves, flowers, and fruit. The canopy plays a key role in light energy capture via photosynthesis, water use as regulated by transpiration, and microclimate of ripening grapes. Canopy management is an important aspect of viticulture due to its effect on grape yields, quality, vigor, and the prevention of grape diseases. Various viticulture problems, such as uneven grape ripening, sunburn, and frost damage, can be addressed by skillful canopy management. In addition to pruning and leaf trim, the canopy is often trained on trellis systems to guide its growth and assist in access for ongoing management and harvest.

== Vine ==
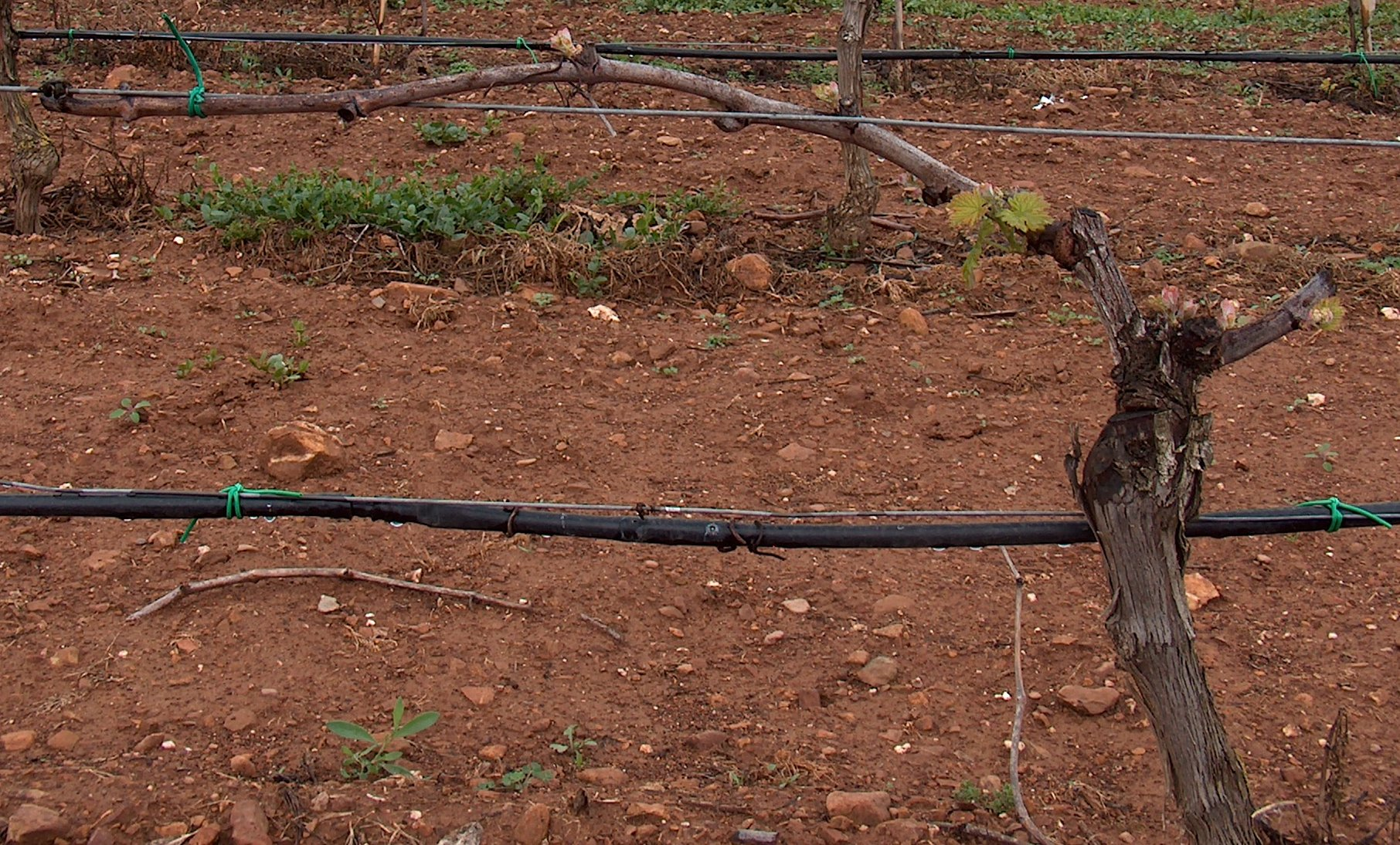
The trunk of a grape vine trained along wires with one cordon extending horizontally to the left.

The vine is the main part of the grapevine, extending from the root system in the ground up to the cordons, or arms, of the vine. When the grape is young the trunk is very pliable and must be supported by stakes as part of a vine training system. The height of the trunk varies depending on grape variety and the type of trellis system being used and can range from 4 inches (10 cm) to 30 feet (10 m). During winter dormancy, the trunk can be vulnerable to extreme freezing conditions and will be sometimes buried and insulated with soil to protect it.

The trunk is composed of sleeves of conductive tissue, most notably the phloem and xylem. The outside bark of the vine contains the phloem tissues which transports sap, enriched by sugars and other molecules, from the leaves to the rest of the vine. During the annual growth cycle of the grapevine, the vine will start to store carbohydrate energy in the wood part of the trunk and roots. The downward passage of phloem sap to the roots and this storing process can be interrupted by the viticultural practice of "girdling" or cincturing the vine. This process can improve fruit set by forcing the vine to direct most of its energy towards developing the grape clusters. The xylem is the woody tissue on the inside of the trunk that moves sap, enriched with water, minerals and other compounds, up from the roots to the leaves.

=== Cordon ===
The cordon, or "arms", of the grapevine extend from the trunk and are the part where additional arms and eventually leaves and grape cluster cordons are usually found along wires as part of a trellis system. This training usually fixes the cordon into a permanent position, such as horizontal extending from the trunk in opposite directions.

== Stem ==
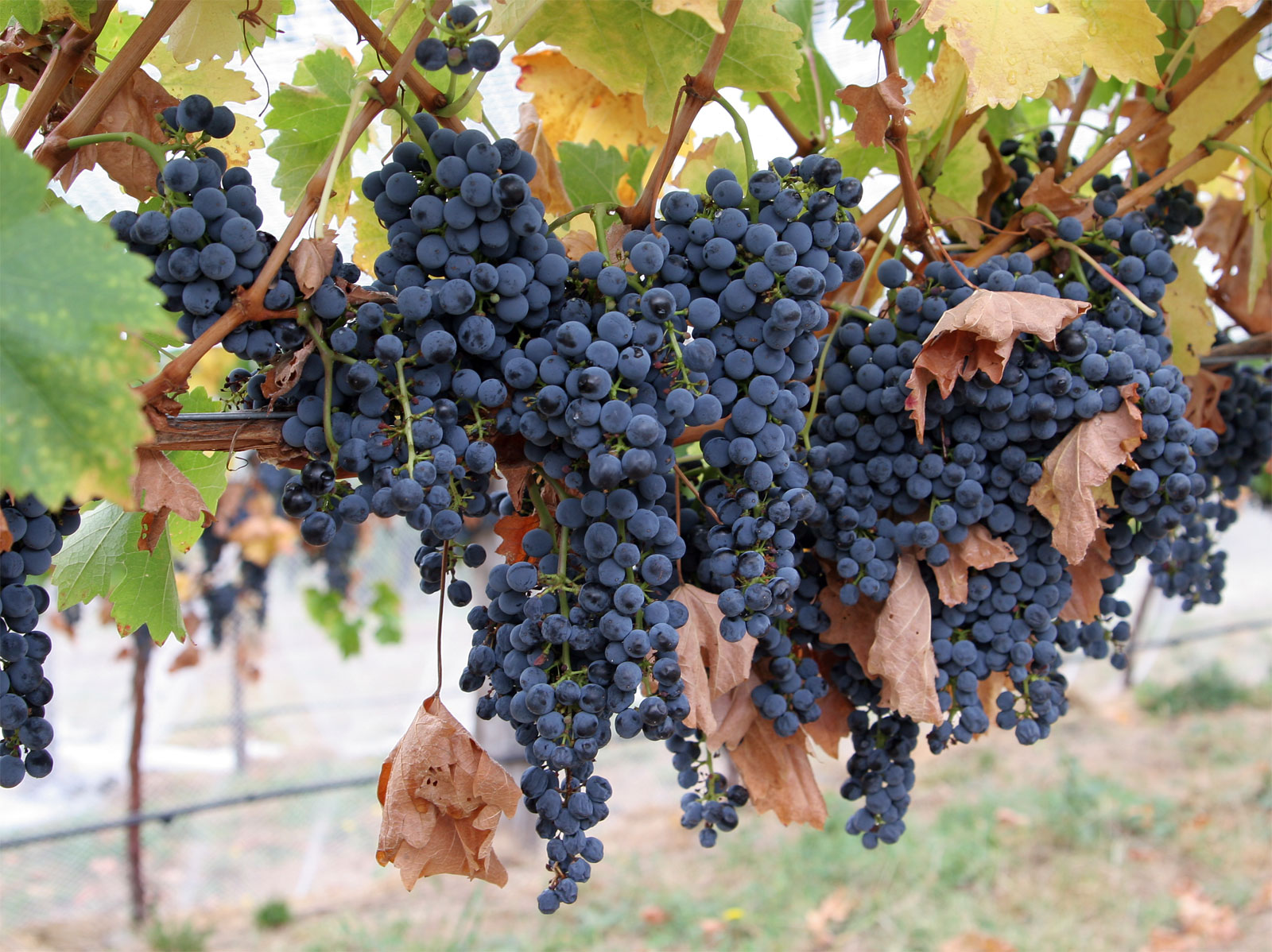
During veraison, when the grapes change color, the shoots of the vine start to harden and brown.

The terms stem, stalks and shoots are sometimes used interchangeably but viticulturalists generally make some differentiation. The grapevine stem that extends from the cordon is considered the shoot and is most often pruned by shoot thinning to control grape yields. The stalk extending out to hold the grape cluster is known as the bunchstem while the stem of the individual grape berry is the pedicel.

The shoot of the vine develops from new buds located on the cordon and grow to include the leaves, tendrils and eventually grape clusters. Shoots first begin to appear in spring, following bud break, accelerating growth till the flowering stage and usually slowly by the time that the vine begins veraison. During the stage of veraison (typically mid to late summer), the shoot starts to harden and change color from green to brown.

=== Cane ===
The shoot is ripening at this point and becomes known as a "cane." In wintertime, the canes of the grapevine are usually completely cut off with the amount and weight of the cane being used to gauge the amount of pruning and canopy management that will be needed for the upcoming year. The "tip" of the shoot is the small (0.4 in/1 cm) part of the shoot furthermost from the vine. Viticulturalist use the growth of this tip as an indication of vine vigor because the tip competes with the grape clusters for resources from the vine. Ideally, shoot growth should come to a stop around the time of veraison; a vine that continues growing the shoots will stand the chance of less fully developed grape clusters.

== Leaves ==
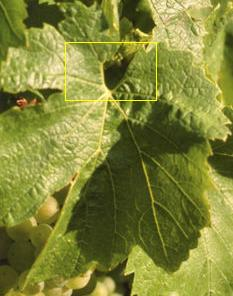
Ampelographers would be able to identify this Chardonnay leaf based on the size and shape of its five lobes and the naked veins around its sinus.(highlighted in box)

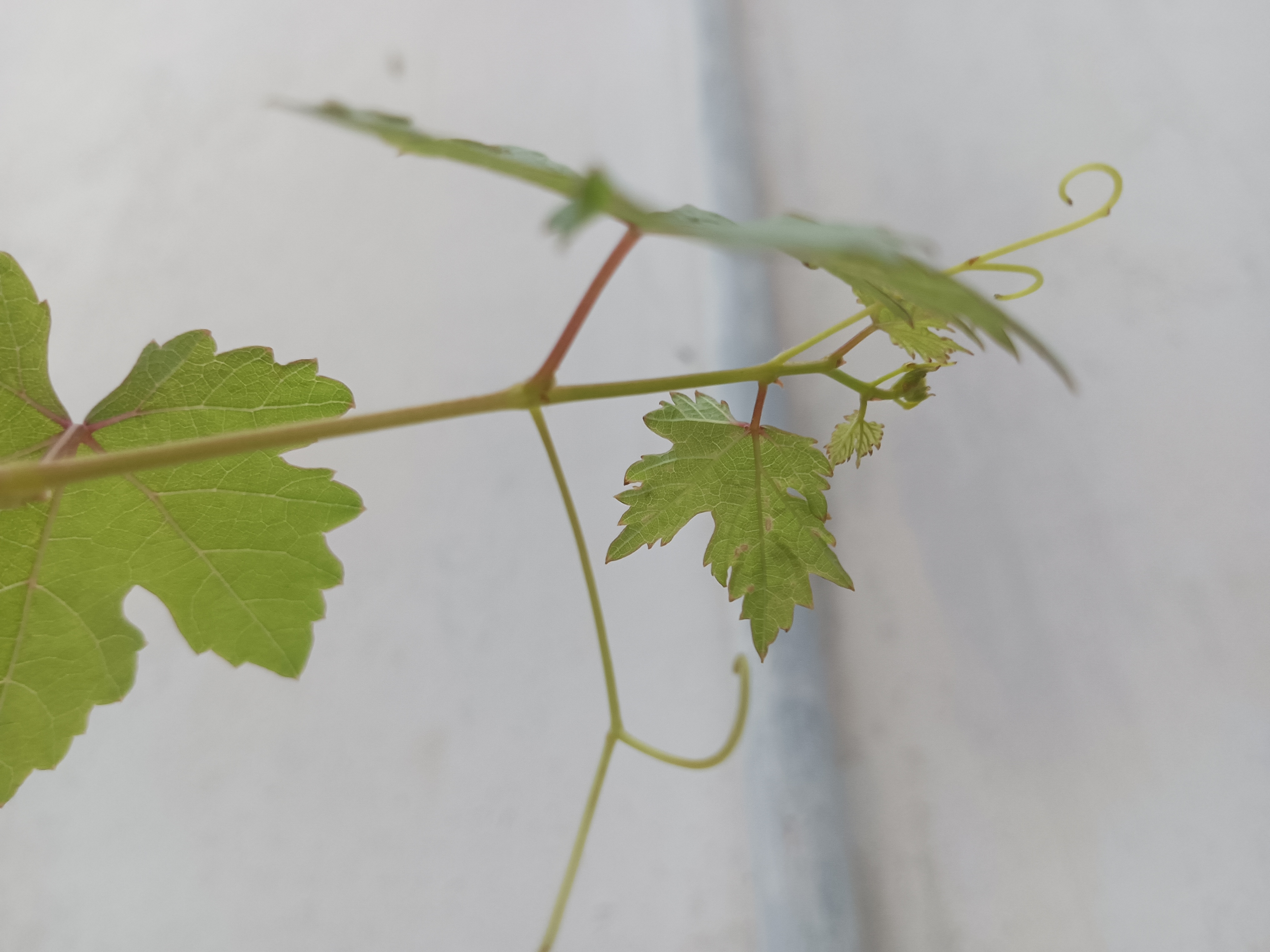
Angelica new leaves

A grapevine's leaves are the most visible part of the canopy and also one of the most important. It is through the leaves that the vital physiological process of photosynthesis takes places which creates the carbohydrates that the vine needs to grow and process grape clusters. The size of the leaves vary due to grape varieties with varieties like Merlot having very large leaves and Gewürztraminer noted for having small leaves. The typical size is normally comparable to that of a human hand. In addition to size, there are many of other unique characteristics to the leaves that ampelographers use for plant identification. The size and shape of the leaf's sinus (the opening space where the blade of the leaf connects to the petiole), the shape of the "teeth" along the outer edge, the arrangement of the five lobes or projecting parts and the angle and length of the veins can all assist in identifying the grapevine.

The color of the leaf can be an indication of the health and nutrition of the vine. Chlorophyll in the leaf gives it a natural greenish color. Prior to the winter dormancy, the vine will stop being photosynthetically active which will contribute to a natural break down of chlorophyll and changing of color. However, deficiency in nitrogen or sulfur could cause the vine to turn prematurely (such as before harvest) yellow. The appearance of reddish spots of brown "dead zones" could be the sign of a viral infection (such as the leafroll virus) or contamination through the use of herbicides.

Viticulturalist will use a leaf to fruit ratio as a guideline in determining a vine's ability to fully ripen grapes. Quite different from the consideration of yields, the balance of leaf cover (needed for photosynthesis) and proportion of fruit (judged by weight rather than number of clusters) could have the most substantial effect on the quality of the grape for winemaking. Pioneered by viticulturalist Richard Smart, the idea of maintaining a "balanced vine" is to have just enough leaf cover for the plant to produce the energy needed to ripen the grape without having too much photosynthetic activity to where the vines has a surplus of energy and continues growing more shoots. Additionally, leaves provide shade to the grape clusters which be beneficial in protecting the clusters from the harshness of heat stress ("sunburn") but excessive shade can also decrease the development of sugars, anthocyanins and other phenolics and other important compounds in the grape. Many vineyards employ the practice of leaf removal throughout the growing season to try to maintain optimal leaf coverage.

== See also ==
- Canopy (biology)
