= Bottle-shock =

Temporary condition of wine

Bottle-shock or Bottle-sickness is a temporary condition of wine characterized by muted or disjointed fruit flavors. It often occurs immediately after bottling or when wines (usually fragile wines) are given an additional dose of sulfur (in the form of sulfur dioxide or sulfite solution). After a few weeks, the condition usually disappears.
