= Lees (fermentation) =

Deposits of dead yeast in wine-making

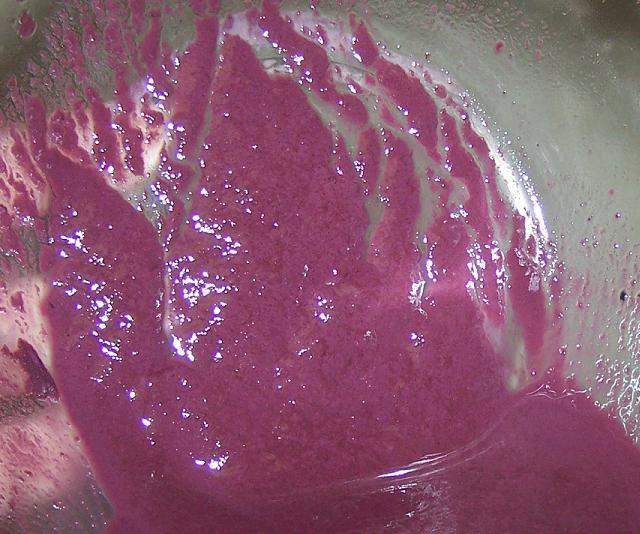
Lees from Merlot after fermentation

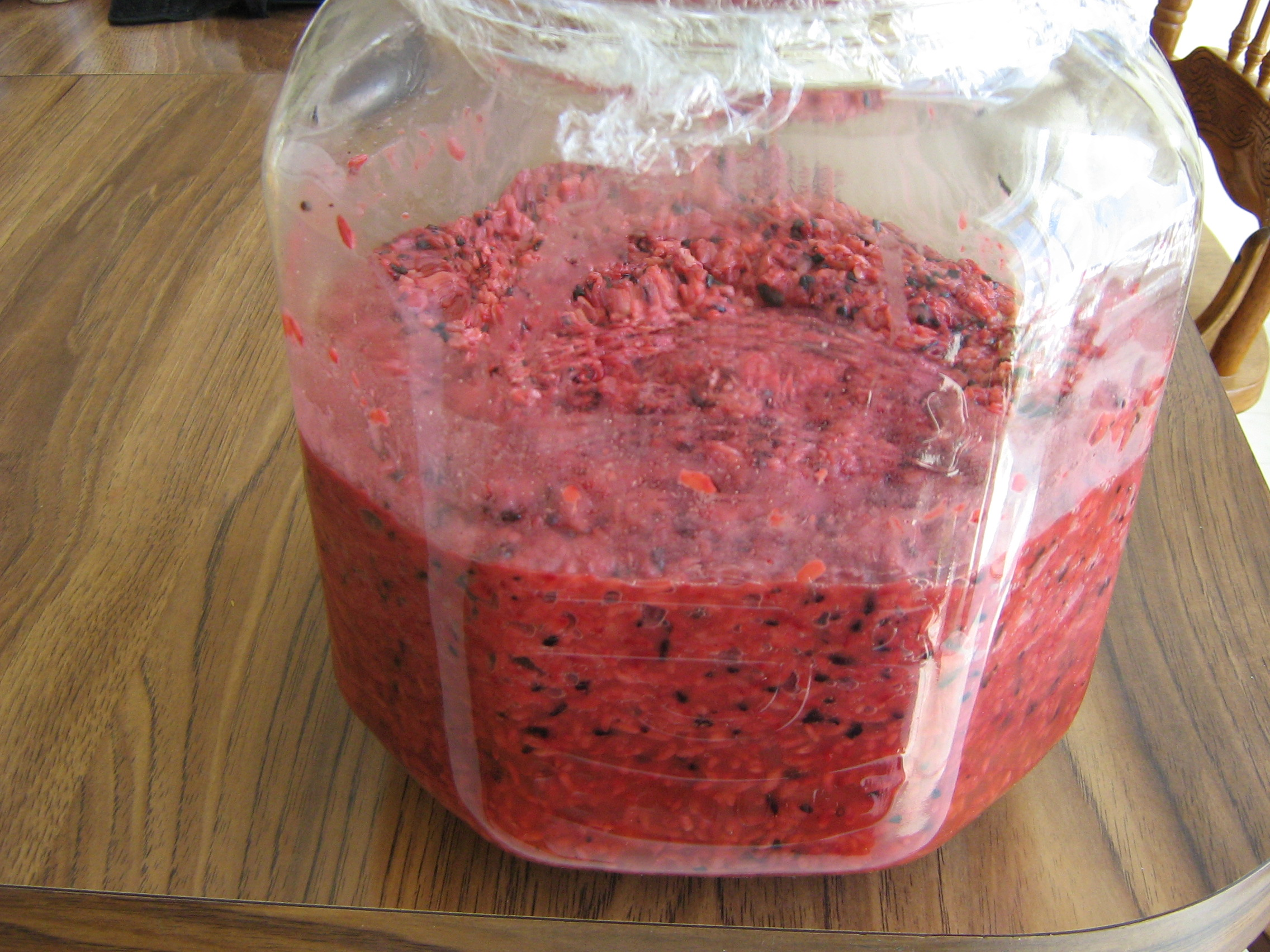
Fujian red rice wine lees

Lees are sedimentary deposits of dead yeast or residual yeast and other particles that precipitate, or are carried by the action of "fining", to the bottom of a vat of wine after fermentation and aging. When brewing beer, this sediment is known as trub, not lees. However, when formed during secondary fermentation, yeast residual sediment is named lees for both wine and beer, or dregs for beer alone. This material is the source for most commercial tartaric acid, which is used in cooking and in organic chemistry.

The term in English derives from Middle English lie, from Anglo-French, from Medieval Latin lia. Webster's Third International Dictionary shows from lia, "probably of Celtic origin, akin to Old Irish lige (bed), Gaulish legasit (he laid) and Welsh llaid (mud)."

Normally, the wine is transferred to another container (racking), leaving this sediment behind. Some wines (notably Chardonnay, Champagne, and Muscadet) are sometimes aged for a time on the lees (a process known as sur lie), leading to a distinctive yeasty aroma and taste. The lees may be stirred (French: bâtonnage) for uptake of their flavour.

The lees are an important component in the making of ripasso, where the leftover lees from Amarone are used to impart more flavour and colour to partially aged Valpolicella.

Fujian red wine chicken is made from rice wine lees.

== Sur lie ==
Sur lie literally translates from French as 'on lees'. Sur lie wines are bottled directly from the lees without racking (a process for filtering the wine). In the case of great Chardonnay, such as Montrachet, this adds a toasty, nutty "hazelnut" quality and additional depth and complexity. Chemically, this can alter the oak flavour molecules, increasing the integration, and making the oak seem less obtrusive to the palate. This is desirable because oak tannins are polyphenolic acids, and can be harsh. This process can also give an added freshness and creaminess to the wine, and improve color and clarity. Muscadet is made in this fashion. The effect of the lees during bottle fermentation for at least 18 months on Champagne is considerable. The "bready" toasty notes associated with some of the greatest sparkling wines made are the result of sur lie aging.

=== Other uses ===
Beer on an element of lees (residual sediment) is also sold, such as many

- Trappist beers
- Unibroue Quebec, Canada-based ales/beers
- Real ales of older styles (not India Pale Ale)
- Weissbiers

Kombucha can also be brewed sur lie.

Lees can also be distilled to produce Hefebrand, or "lees spirit", an alcoholic beverage containing a minimum of 38% alcohol by volume.

== Light lees protocol ==
In a process in which yeast is added to wine that has completed primary fermentation, this secondary yeast addition typically remains in the wine from 2–8 weeks, depending on the winemaker's goals. The yeast is stirred (bâtonage) frequently, and racked when the protocol is complete. Also known as secondary autolysis, a light lees protocol releases additional mannoproteins and polysaccharides that can influence the flavour, tannins, and acidity of the wine.

== See also ==
- Sake kasu
