= Wine chemistry =

Chemistry of wine

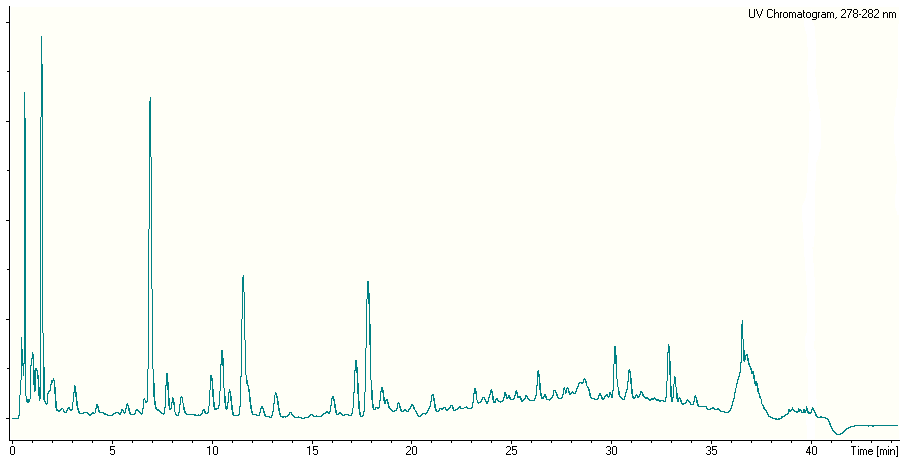
280 nm 45 min LC chromatogram of a red wine, showing mainly phenolic compounds

Wine is a complex mixture of chemical compounds in a hydro-alcoholic solution with a pH around 4. The chemistry of wine and its resultant quality depend on achieving a balance between three aspects of the berries used to make the wine: their sugar content, acidity and the presence of secondary compounds. Vines store sugar in grapes through photosynthesis, and acids break down as grapes ripen. Secondary compounds are also stored in the course of the season. Anthocyanins give grapes a red color and protection against ultraviolet light. Tannins add bitterness and astringency which acts to defend vines against pests and grazing animals.

Environmental factors such as soil, rainfall and fog affect flavor in ways that can be described collectively as "character" or the French term "terroir". As climate change disrupts long-established patterns of temperature and precipitation in wine-growing regions and causes more extreme weather events, the rate at which sugars, acids and secondary compounds develop during the growing season can be disrupted. Hotter temperatures and an earlier growing season can push chemistry of berries towards higher sugar content, less acids and differences in aromas. Other factors such as smoke taint from fires can negatively impact chemistry and flavor, resulting in flaws and wine faults that can make the wines undrinkable.

== Types of natural molecules present in wine ==
- Acids in wine
- Phenolic compounds in wine
- Proteins in wine
- Sugars in wine
- Yeast assimilable nitrogen
- Minerals
- Dissolved gas (CO_{2})
- Monoterpenes and sesquiterpenes such as linalool and α-terpineol
- Glutathione (reduced and oxidized)

=== Volatiles ===
- Methoxypyrazines
- Esters: Ethyl acetate is the most common ester in wine, being the product of the most common volatile organic acid — acetic acid, and the ethyl alcohol generated during the fermentation.
- Norisoprenoids, such as C13-norisoprenoids found in grape (Vitis vinifera) or wine, can be produced by fungal peroxidases or glycosidases.

== Other molecules found in wine ==
=== Preservatives ===
- Ascorbic acid is used during wine making
- Sulfur dioxide (SO_{2}), a preservative often added to wine

=== Fining agents ===
Gum arabic has been used in the past as fining agent.

List of additives permitted for use in the production of wine under European Union law:

Type or purpose of addition	Permitted additives
Acidification	tartaric acid
Clarification	calcium alginate potassium alginate potassium caseinate casein isinglass silicon dioxide edible gelatine acacia (gum arabic) milk/lactalbumin proteins of plant origin ovalbumin (egg white) aluminum silicates ferrous sulfate
Decolourants	polyvinylpolypyrrolidone (PVPP) activated charcoal
Deacidification	lactic bacteria neutral potassium tartrate potassium bicarbonate calcium carbonate
Deodorant	copper sulfate
Elaboration	oak chips metatartaric acid water
Enrichment	concentrated grape must rectified concentrated grape must saccharose tannin oxygen
Enzymes	betaglucanase pectolytics urease
Fermentation	fresh lees ammonium bisulfite thiamine hydrochloride yeast cell walls yeasts for wine production diammonium phosphate ammonium sulfate ammonium sulfite
Sequestrants	fresh lees potassium ferrocyanide calcium phytate citric acid
Stabilisation	calcium tartrate potassium bitartrate yeast mannoproteins sorbic acid sulfur dioxide argon nitrogen potassium bisulfite dimethyl dicarbonate (DMDC) carbon dioxide potassium metabisulfite/disulfite allyl isothiocyanate lysozyme potassium sorbate ascorbic acid

=== Others ===
- Melatonin
- Wine lactone
- Anthocyanone A, a degradation product of malvidin under acidic conditions

== Wine faults ==
2,4,6-trichloroanisole, the chemical primarily responsible for cork taint in wines

A wine fault or defect is an unpleasant characteristic of a wine often resulting from poor winemaking practices or storage conditions, and leading to wine spoilage. Many of the compounds that cause wine faults are already naturally present in wine but at insufficient concentrations to adversely affect it. However, when the concentration of these compounds greatly exceeds the sensory threshold, they replace or obscure the flavors and aromas that the wine should be expressing (or that the winemaker wants the wine to express). Ultimately the quality of the wine is reduced, making it less appealing and sometimes undrinkable.

The yeast Brettanomyces produces an array of metabolites when growing in wine, some of which are volatile phenolic compounds. Brettanomyces converts p-coumaric acid to 4-vinylphenol via the enzyme cinnamate decarboxylase. 4-Vinylphenol is further reduced to 4-ethylphenol by the enzyme vinyl phenol reductase. 4-Ethylphenol causes a wine fault at a concentration of greater than 140 μg/L. Other compounds produced by Brettanomyces that cause wine faults include 4-ethylguaiacol and isovaleric acid.

Coumaric acid is sometimes added to microbiological media, enabling the positive identification of Brettanomyces by smell.

Geraniol is a by-product of the metabolism of sorbate.

Fusel alcohols are a mixture of several alcohols (chiefly amyl alcohol) produced as a by-product of alcoholic fermentation.

== See also ==
- Alcohol (drug)
- Beer chemistry
- Food chemistry
- Premature oxidation
- Congener (alcohol), such as tryptophol
