= 4-Vinylphenol =

Names
- Preferred IUPAC name 4-Ethenylphenol
- Other names p-Vinylphenol p-Hydroxystyrene; 4-VP

Identifiers
CAS Number	2628-17-3
3D model (JSmol)	Interactive image
ChemSpider	56234
ECHA InfoCard	100.018.276
PubChem CID	62453
UNII	OA7V1SM8YL
CompTox Dashboard (EPA)	DTXSID7073301
- InChI: InChI=1S/C8H8O/c1-2-7-3-5-8(9)6-4-7/h2-6,9H,1H2 Key: FUGYGGDSWSUORM-UHFFFAOYSA-N; InChI=1/C8H8O/c1-2-7-3-5-8(9)6-4-7/h2-6,9H,1H2 Key: FUGYGGDSWSUORM-UHFFFAOYAQ
- SMILES: C=CC1=CC=C(C=C1)O

Properties
Chemical formula	C_{8}H_{8}O
Molar mass	120.15 g/mol
Appearance	white sublimable solid
Melting point	73.5 °C (164.3 °F; 346.6 K)
- Except where otherwise noted, data are given for materials in their standard state (at 25 °C [77 °F], 100 kPa). verify (what is ?) Infobox references

4-Vinylphenol is an organic compound with the formula C_{2}H_{3}C_{6}H_{4}OH. It is the most studied of the three isomeric vinylphenols. It is a white volatile solid.

== Production ==
Upon contact with iron oxide at 500 °C, 4-ethylphenol undergoes dehydrogenation to give 4-vinyllphenol:

C_{2}H_{5}C_{6}H_{4}OH → C_{2}H_{3}C_{6}H_{4}OH + H_{2}

== Natural occurrence ==
It is found in wine and beer. It is produced by the spoilage yeast Brettanomyces. When it reaches concentrations greater than the sensory threshold, it can give the wine aromas described as barnyard, medicinal, band-aids, and mousy. In wine, 4-vinylphenol can react with other molecules, such as anthocyanidins, to produce new chemical compounds. In white wines vinylphenols are dominant (4-vinylphenol 70-1 150 μg/L, 4-vinylguaiacol 10-490 μg/L) whereas, in red wines, it is the corresponding ethyl phenols.

=== Biosynthesis ===
The conversion of p-coumaric acid to 4-ethylphenol by Brettanomyces via 4-vinylphenol

The enzyme cinnamate decarboxylase converts p-coumaric acid to 4-vinylphenol. 4-Vinylphenol is further reduced to 4-ethylphenol by the enzyme vinyl phenol reductase. Coumaric acid is sometimes added to microbiological media, enabling the positive identification of Brettanomyces by smell.

== See also ==
- 4-Ethylguaiacol
- Yeast in winemaking
- Wine fault
- Wine chemistry
- Poly-4-vinylphenol (polyvinylphenol or PVP) is a plastic structurally similar to polystyrene.
