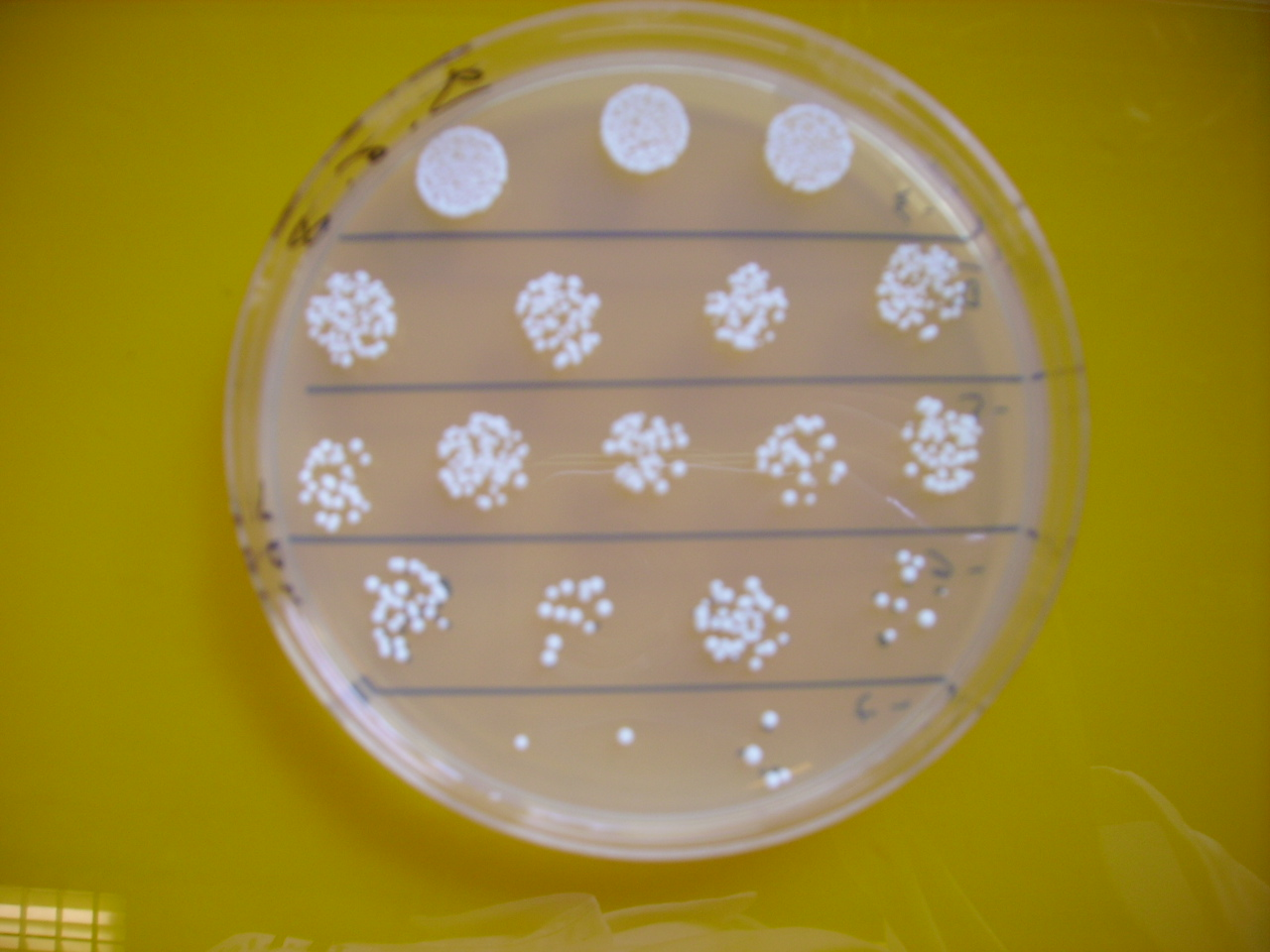
- Appearance of colonies of Brettanomyces bruxellensis on YPD (Yeast Peptone D-glucose) agar.

Scientific classification
- Kingdom: Fungi
- Division: Ascomycota
- Class: Saccharomycetes
- Order: Saccharomycetales
- Family: Pichiaceae
- Genus: Brettanomyces
- Species: B. bruxellensis

Binomial name
- Brettanomyces bruxellensis Kufferath and von Laer

= Brettanomyces bruxellensis =

Species of fungus

Brettanomyces bruxellensis (the anamorph of Dekkera bruxellensis) is a yeast associated with the Senne valley near Brussels, Belgium. Despite its Latin species name, B. bruxellensis is found all over the globe. In the wild, it is often found on the skins of fruit.

== Beer production ==
B. bruxellensis plays a key role in the production of the typical Belgian beer styles such as lambic, Flanders red ales, gueuze and kriek, and is part of spontaneous fermentation biota. The Trappist Orval has very little in it as well. It is naturally found in the brewery environment living within oak barrels that are used for the storage of beer during the secondary conditioning stage. Here it completes the long slow fermentation or super-attenuation of beer, often in symbiosis with Pediococcus sp. Macroscopically visible colonies look whitish and show a dome-shaped aspect, depending on the age and size.

B. bruxellensis is increasingly being used by American craft brewers, especially in Maine, California and Colorado. Jolly Pumpkin Artisan Ales, Allagash Brewing Company, Port Brewing Company, Sierra Nevada Brewing Company, Russian River Brewing Company and New Belgium Brewing Company have all brewed beers fermented with B. bruxellensis. The beers have a slightly sour, earthy character. Some have described them as having a "barnyard" or "wet horse blanket" flavor.

== Wine production ==
In the wine industry, B. bruxellensis is generally considered a spoilage yeast and it and other members of the genus are often referred to as Brettanomyces ("brett"). Its metabolic products can impart "sweaty saddle leather", "barnyard", "burnt plastic" or "band-aid" aromas to wine. Some winemakers in France, and occasionally elsewhere, consider it a desirable addition to wine, e.g., in Château de Beaucastel, but New World vintners generally consider it a defect. Some authorities consider brett to be responsible for 90% of the spoilage problems in premium red wines.

One defense against brett is to limit potential sources of contamination. It occurs more commonly in some vineyards than others, so producers can avoid purchasing grapes from such sources. Used wine barrels purchased from other vintners are another common source. Some producers sanitize used barrels with ozone. Others steam or soak them for many hours in very hot water, or wash them with either citric acid or peroxycarbonate.

If wine becomes contaminated by brett, some vintners sterile filter it, add SO2, or treat it with dimethyl dicarbonate. Both knowledge and experience are considered helpful in avoiding brett and the problems it can cause.

== Biochemistry ==
B. bruxellensis contains the enzyme vinylphenol reductase.

== See also ==
- Lambic
- Wine fault
- Yeast in winemaking
