= PVP =

PVP, pvp, or PvP may refer to:

== Media and culture ==
- Player versus player, a type of combat in multiplayer video games
- PrankvsPrank, a YouTube channel
- PvP (webcomic), a webcomic
- PVP Live, an Esports news and statistics database website
- Pony VS Pony, a web-based Flash game developed by Artix Entertainment
- PVP, a Spanish punk band

== Medicine ==
- Post-vasectomy pain syndrome, a chronic pain condition
- Povidone-iodine prep, an iodine antiseptic
- alpha-PVP, also called flakka, the drug alpha-Pyrrolidinopentiophenone
- Photoselective vaporization of the prostate, a surgical treatment for an enlarged prostate

== Military ==
- Petit Véhicule Protégé, a French light armoured vehicle

== Science and technology ==
- PVP-OPM (Protected Video Path – Output Protection Management), a form of digital rights management
- Poly-4-vinylphenol, a plastic similar to polystyrene
- Polyvinylpyrrolidone, a water-soluble polymer

== Companies ==
- PVP Karting, a Danish manufacturer of racing Superkarts

== Other uses ==
- Plant variety protection, a legal principle protecting plant varieties developed by selective breeding
- P v P, a New Zealand court case regarding promissory estoppel
- Palos Verdes Peninsula, a peninsula in Southern California
- Parti des Verts pour le Progrès, a Tunisian political party
