= 4-Ethylphenol =

Names
- Preferred IUPAC name 4-Ethylphenol
- Other names p-Ethylphenol; 1-Ethyl-4-hydroxybenzene; 1-Hydroxy-4-ethylbenzene; 4-Hydroxyphenylethane

Identifiers
CAS Number	123-07-9
3D model (JSmol)	Interactive image
ChEBI	CHEBI:49584
ChEMBL	ChEMBL108475
ChemSpider	28982
ECHA InfoCard	100.004.181
EC Number	204-598-6
KEGG	C13637
PubChem CID	31242
UNII	AGG7E6G0ZC
CompTox Dashboard (EPA)	DTXSID4021977
- InChI: InChI=1S/C8H10O/c1-2-7-3-5-8(9)6-4-7/h3-6,9H,2H2,1H3 Key: HXDOZKJGKXYMEW-UHFFFAOYSA-N; InChI=1/C8H10O/c1-2-7-3-5-8(9)6-4-7/h3-6,9H,2H2,1H3 Key: HXDOZKJGKXYMEW-UHFFFAOYAF
- SMILES: Oc1ccc(cc1)CC

Properties
Chemical formula	C_{8}H_{10}O
Molar mass	122.167 g·mol^{−1}
Appearance	White solid
Odor	leather-like
Melting point	45.1 °C (113.2 °F; 318.2 K)
Boiling point	218 °C (424 °F; 491 K)

Hazards
- GHS labelling
Pictograms	(GHS05: Corrosive)
Signal word	Danger
Hazard statements	H314
Precautionary statements	P260, P264, P280, P301+P330+P331, P303+P361+P353, P304+P340, P305+P351+P338, P310, P321, P363, P405, P501
NFPA 704 (fire diamond)	2 1 0
Flash point	104 °C (219 °F; 377 K)
- Except where otherwise noted, data are given for materials in their standard state (at 25 °C [77 °F], 100 kPa). verify (what is ?) Infobox references

Ethylphenol (4-EP) is an organic compound with the formula C_{2}H_{5}C_{6}H_{4}OH. It is one of three isomeric ethylphenols. A white solid, it occurs as an impurity in xylenols and as such is used in the production of some commercial phenolic resins. It is also a precursor to 4-vinylphenol.

== Production ==
4-Ethylphenol is produced by careful sulfonation of ethylbenzene to 4-ethylphenylsulfonic acid. The sulfonic acid is subsequently subjected to alkaline fusion, the dissolution of the sulfonic acid in molten alkali metal base. The main steps in the synthesis are shown:

EtC_{6}H_{5} + SO_{3} → EtC_{6}H_{4}SO_{3}H (Et = ethyl)
EtC_{6}H_{4}SO_{3}H + NaOH → EtC_{6}H_{4}ONa + NaHSO_{3}
EtC_{6}H_{4}ONa + H^{+} → ArOH + Na^{+}

== Natural occurrences ==
In wine and beer, 4-EP is produced by the yeast Brettanomyces. At concentrations greater than 140 μg/L (typical sensory threshold) it gives the wine aromas described as barnyard, medicinal, band-aids, and mousy. In certain Belgian beer styles, a high 4-EP level may be desirable; however, very high levels of the compound in wine can render it undrinkable. The level of 4-EP is roughly proportional to Brettanomyces concentration and activity, and can therefore be used as an indicator of the yeast's presence. There are significant differences between strains of Brettanomyces in their ability to produce 4-EP.

4-EP is also a component of castoreum, the exudate from the castor sacs of the mature North American beaver (Castor canadensis) and the Eurasian beaver (Castor fiber), used in perfumery.

== Biochemistry ==
4-EP is biosynthesized in two steps from p-coumaric acid. Decarboxylation gives 4-vinylphenol as catalyzed by the enzyme cinnamate decarboxylase. 4-Vinylphenol is further reduced to 4-ethylphenol by the enzyme vinyl phenol reductase. Coumaric acid is sometimes added to microbiological media, enabling the positive identification of Brettanomyces by smell.

The conversion of p-coumaric acid to 4-EP by Brettanomyces

== See also ==
- 4-Ethylguaiacol
- Yeast in winemaking
- Wine fault
- Wine chemistry
