= OR11H6 =

Protein-coding gene in the species Homo sapiens

Identifiers
- Aliases: OR11H6, olfactory receptor family 11 subfamily H member 6
- External IDs: MGI: 3030579; GeneCards: OR11H6

Gene location (Human)
Chr.	Chromosome 14 (human)
Band	14q11.2	Start	20,223,710 bp
Band	14q11.2	End	20,224,702 bp

Gene location (Mouse)
Chr.	Chromosome 14 (mouse)
Band	14|14 C1	Start	50,876,845 bp
Band	14|14 C1	End	50,881,342 bp
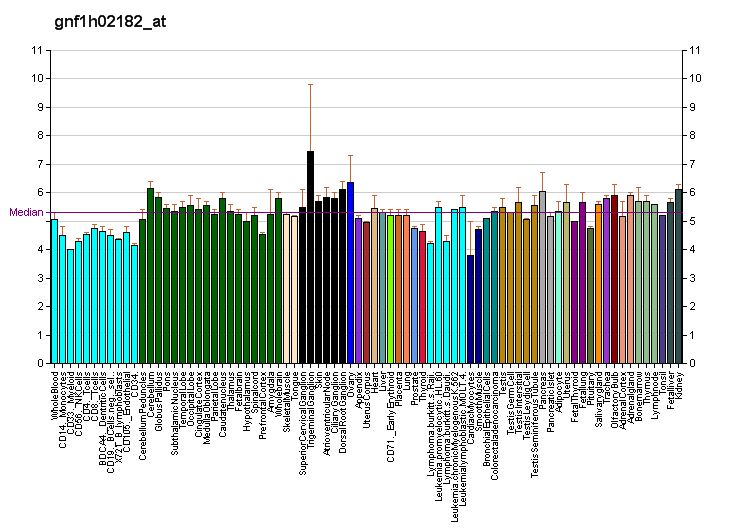
RNA expression pattern
Bgee	Human / Mouse (ortholog); Top expressed in: sural nerve; right auricle of heart / Top expressed in: respiratory epithelium; nasal epithelium; olfactory epithelium; proximal tubule; olfactory bulb; lung; More reference expression data
BioGPS	More reference expression data
Gene ontology
Molecular function	olfactory receptor activity; signal transducer activity; G protein-coupled receptor activity
Cellular component	integral component of membrane; plasma membrane; membrane
Biological process	sensory perception of smell; detection of chemical stimulus involved in sensory perception of smell; signal transduction; response to stimulus; G protein-coupled receptor signaling pathway
Sources:Amigo / QuickGO
Orthologs
Databases	NCBI: entry; OMA: entry
Species	Human	Mouse
Entrez	122748	258296
Ensembl	ENSG00000176219	ENSMUSG00000050028
UniProt	Q8NGC7	Q7TRL9
RefSeq (mRNA)	NM_001004480	NM_146299
RefSeq (protein)	NP_001004480	NP_666411
Location (UCSC)	Chr 14: 20.22 – 20.22 Mb	Chr 14: 50.88 – 50.88 Mb
PubMed search
- Wikidata
View/Edit Human	View/Edit Mouse

Olfactory receptor 11H6 is a protein that in humans is encoded by the OR11H6 gene.

Olfactory receptors interact with odorant molecules in the nose, to initiate a neuronal response that triggers the perception of a smell. The olfactory receptor proteins are members of a large family of G-protein-coupled receptors (GPCR) arising from single coding-exon genes. Olfactory receptors share a 7-transmembrane domain structure with many neurotransmitter and hormone receptors and are responsible for the recognition and G protein-mediated transduction of odorant signals. The olfactory receptor gene family is the largest in the genome. The nomenclature assigned to the olfactory receptor genes and proteins for this organism is independent of other organisms.

== Ligands ==
- Isovaleric acid

== See also ==
- Olfactory receptor
