= Browning in red wine =

Chemical process affecting red wines

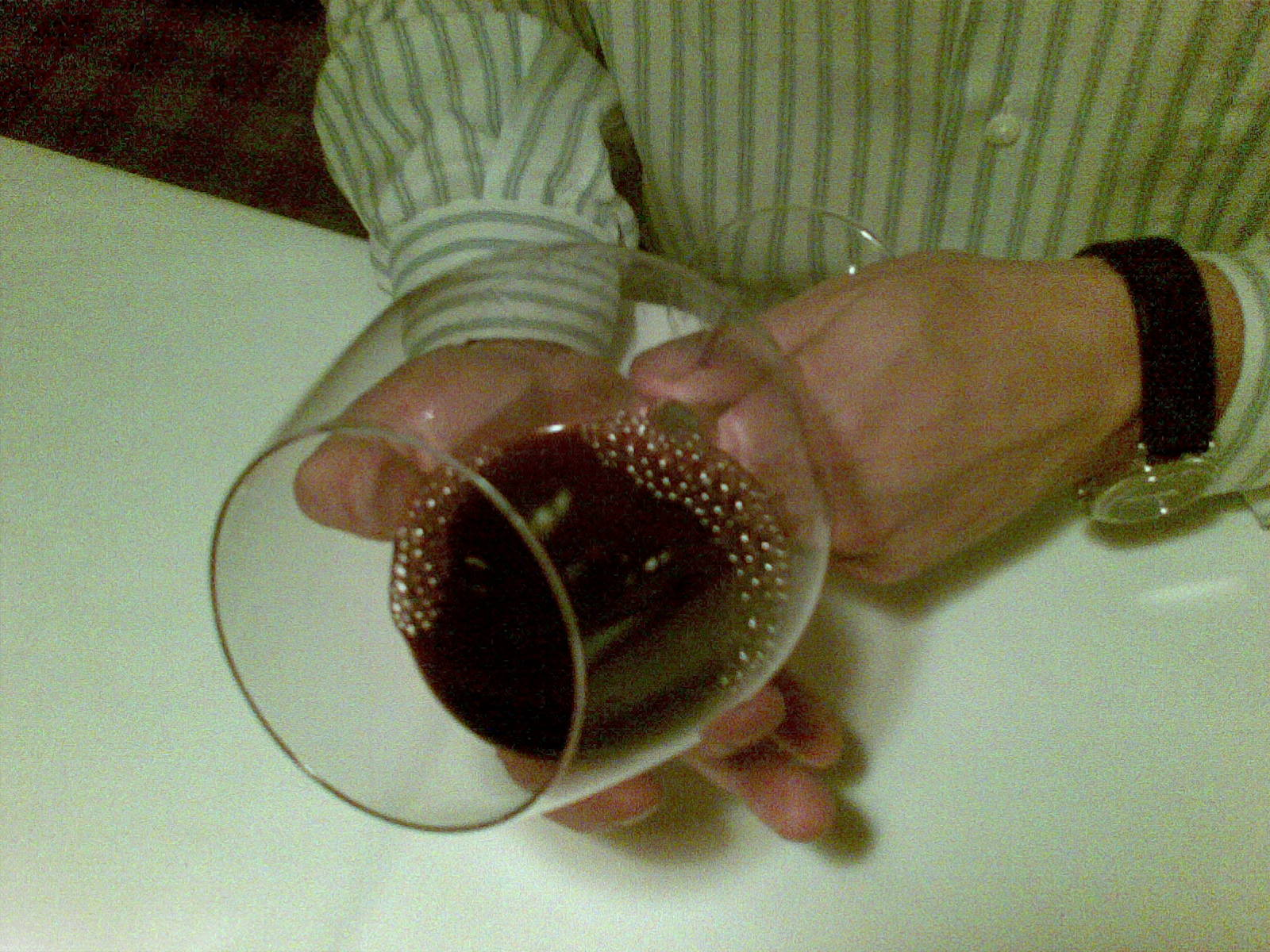
A wine tasting assessing the age of a red wine by tilting the glass forward and observing the rim variation and change of color against a white surface.

Oxidation and reduction in red wines can lead to a particularly undesirable brick red color in red wines (or an "orangey" color in white wines). This process is sometimes referred to as browning. In chemical terms, this is called a redox reaction because first the color of the wine deepens after fermentation through oxidation, and then the color begins to brown after bottling through reduction. Browning is not strictly considered a bad thing in every wine that is produced, as sometimes the oxidation process can contribute to the style of the wine in a positive and desirable way.

Generally speaking, however, browning is a sign of the wine going stale from too much exposure to oxygen. Although wine that has gone bad is typically associated with the smell and taste of vinegar or unwanted effervescence, oxidation itself can actually lead to "nutty", "applesauce", and "burnt marshmallow" aromas. The sharp vinegar component comes from acetic acid formed through bacterial processes. A lower pH level is typically preferred in wines because it decreases the overall risk of spoilage. The lower pH reduces the effect of browning and yields better colors, particularly in red wines.

== Significance of color ==
Swedish wine expert Bengt Frithiofsson tasting Chinese red wine

The color of a red wine will have many variables that influence it besides its exposure to oxygen that pertain to other viticultural aspects such as different growing climates, cultivars, and production methods. For example, wines made from hybrid grapes can range anywhere from light pink to purple due to their chemical composition. Dr. Leo McCloskey, best known for his contributions in developing the Enologix software, points out that "Chemical ecology says that a wine's flavor, color and fragrance are expressions of its ecosystem."

However, when people perceive wines, the visual cues received from the color of the wine have a strong impact on their opinion of the wine. In a primitive sense, visual cues will generally have a stronger impact on humans than aromatic components since humans have evolved to identify things with eyesight, rather than through scent relative to other evolved species that rely on different sensory capacities more than they do on eyesight. This idea of a particular significance of color in the perception of wine is especially true in red wines.

Browning is therefore an important issue both for winemakers and for wine consumers, and is generally avoided. A well-known exception to this is sherry, which is often purposely developed with oxidation as part of the production process; however, it can be considered a white wine since it is traditionally made from Palomino grapes.

== Odor effects ==
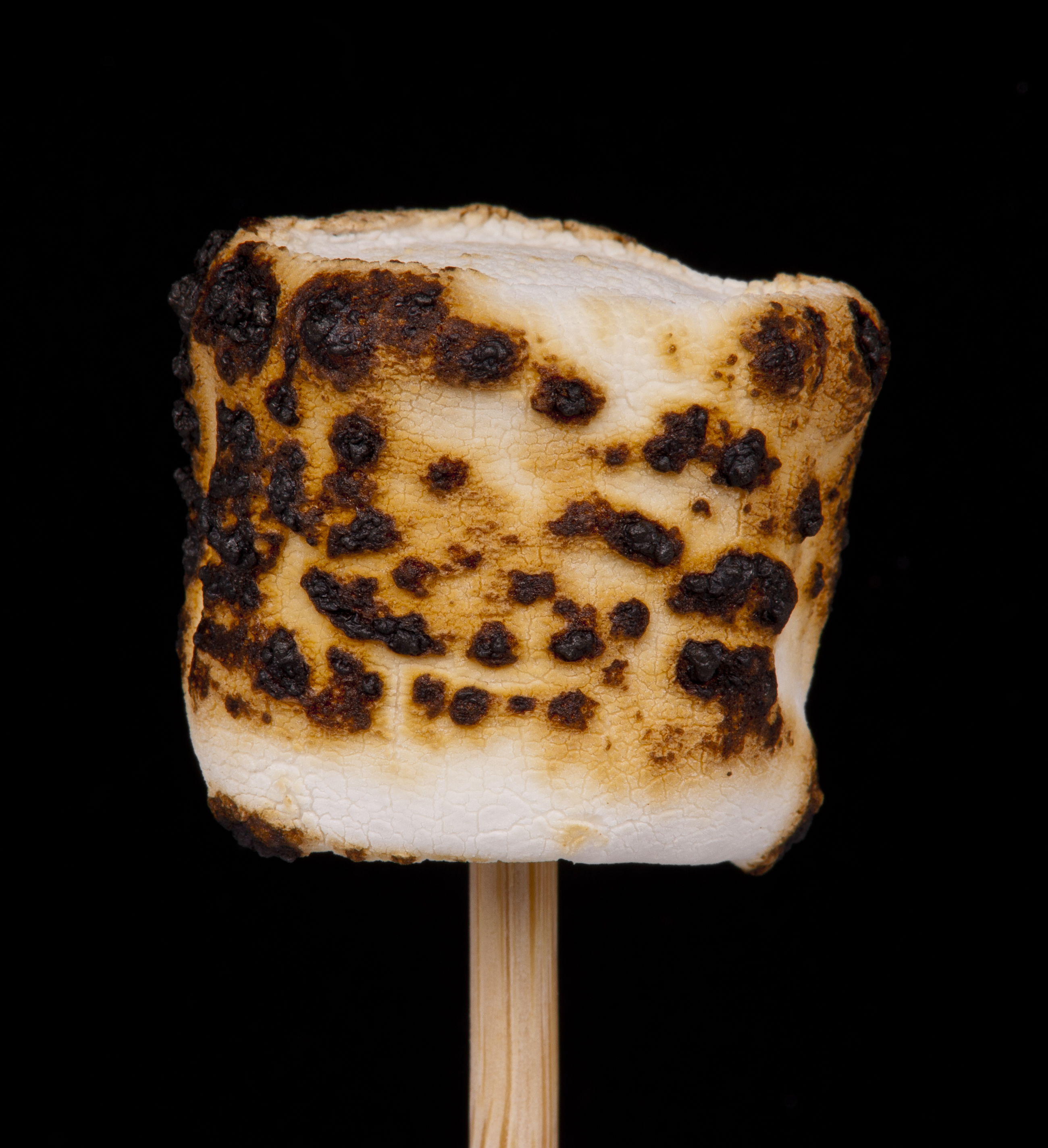
A scent often referenced in aged wines is that of a burnt marshmallow.

Through the aging of wine, its aroma compounds are affected as well. The esters in the wine that were initially created during fermentation become reduced as they break back down into alcohol and carboxyl groups so the floral, fruity smells that are associated with freshness in a wine decrease. Meanwhile, the nutty, cooked smells increase through carbohydrate degradation.

== See also ==
- Wine fault
- Maderisation
