= 4-Hydroxycinnamate decarboxylase =

Class of enzymes

- EC no.: ?

4-Hydroxycinnamate decarboxylase is an enzyme that uses p-coumaric acid to produce 4-ethylphenol.

p-Coumaric acid is the precursor of 4-ethylphenol produced by the yeast Saccharomyces and Brettanomyces in wine. The yeast converts this to 4-vinylphenol via the enzyme cinnamate decarboxylase.

4-Hydroxycinnamate decarboxylase can also be induced in bacteria species such as Klebsiella oxytoca and works also with p-coumaric acid analogs such as caffeic acid, ferulic acid and E-2,4-dihydroxycinnamic acid.

== See also ==
- Wine chemistry
