= C2H =

C2H or C_{2}H may refer to:

== Science ==
- Ethynyl radical, an organic compound with the chemical formula C≡CH (also written [CCH] or C_{2}H)
- Cinnamate/coumarate 2-hydroxylase, an enzyme in the umbellic acid biosynthesis pathway
- Candida two-hybrid (C2H) system, a variant of the yeast two-hybrid (Y2H) system

== Other uses ==
- Cinema2Home, a cinema distribution platform founded by Cheran
- Contract-to-hire, a form of temporary work
