= C24H36O3 =

The molecular formula C_{24}H_{36}O_{3} (molar mass: 372.549 g/mol) may refer to:

- Anagestone acetate
- Nabilone
- Nandrolone caproate
- Testosterone isovalerate
- Testosterone valerate
