= Hydroxycinnamate 4-beta-glucosyltransferase =

Class of enzymes

Identifiers
- EC no.: 2.4.1.126
- CAS no.: 77848-85-2

Databases
- IntEnz: IntEnz view
- BRENDA: BRENDA entry
- ExPASy: NiceZyme view
- KEGG: KEGG entry
- MetaCyc: metabolic pathway
- PRIAM: profile
- PDB structures: RCSB PDB PDBe PDBsum
- Gene Ontology: AmiGO / QuickGO
Search
- PMC: articles
- PubMed: articles
- NCBI: proteins

Hydroxycinnamate 4-beta-glucosyltransferase (EC 2.4.1.126) is an enzyme that catalyzes the chemical reaction

p-Coumaric acid
+ UDP-glucose
p-Coumaric acid glucoside

The two substrates of this enzyme characterised from tomato are p-coumaric acid and UDP-glucose. Its products are p-coumaric acid glucoside and uridine diphosphate (UDP).

This enzyme belongs to the family of glycosyltransferases, specifically the hexosyltransferases. The systematic name of this enzyme class is UDP-glucose:trans-4-hydroxycinnamate 4-O-beta-D-glucosyltransferase. Other names in common use include uridine diphosphoglucose-hydroxycinnamate glucosyltransferase, UDP-glucose-hydroxycinnamate glucosyltransferase, and hydroxycinnamoyl glucosyltransferase.
