= Spencer Roloson Winery =

Winery in St. Helena, California, United States

Spencer Roloson Winery was a winery in St. Helena, California, United States. It produced wines from the volcanic California hillsides of the St. Helena and Clear Lake areas. It was founded in 1998 by winemaker Samuel Spencer and businesswoman Wendy Roloson with the goal of creating a premium winery. Focusing on Rhone and Spanish varietals, they specialized in single vineyard estate bottlings of Syrah, Viognier and Tempranillo.

The Spencer Roloson portfolio of wines included Tempranillo, Grenache blanc, Grenache noir, Viognier and Syrah. Spencer Roloson Winery also produced a Southern Rhone-style blend called Palaterra as well as Zinfandel.

Spencer Roloson produced wines with grapes harvested from four vineyards. The steep and rocky Madder Lake Vineyard is located directly north of Mount St. Helena in the Clear Lake appellation of Lake County. The La Herradura Vineyard is east of St. Helena at the base of Howell Mountain. Viognier grown at the Noble Vineyard is at the foot of the Mayacamas Mountains, and Grenache blanc at the Esperanza Vineyard in Clarksburg near Sacramento.

The winery was an early client of Enologix, a computer software-driven laboratory analysis service run by a friend of Spencer's that helps winemakers match taste profiles to wines rated highly by Robert Parker and Wine Spectator.
