= Red wine =

Wine made from dark-colored grape varieties

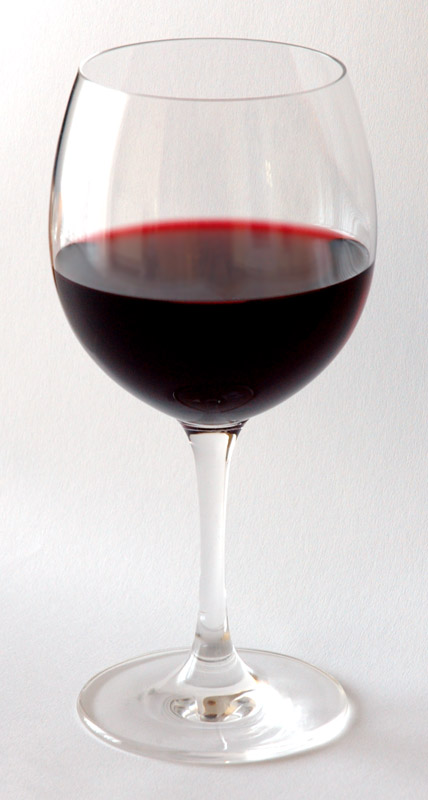
- A glass of red wine.
- Type: Wine
- Alcohol by volume: generally 5.5–15.5%
- Ingredients: Dark-colored grape cultivars
- Variants: See varieties

Red wine is a type of wine made from dark-colored grape varieties (red grapes). The color of the wine can range from intense violet, typical of young wines, through to brick red for mature wines and brown for older red wines. The juice from most purple grapes is greenish-white, the red color coming from anthocyan pigments present in the skin of the grape. Much of the red wine production process involves extraction of color and flavor components from the grape skin.

== Varieties ==
The top 20 red grape varieties by acreage (listed alphabetically) are:

- Alicante Henri Bouschet
- Barbera
- Bobal
- Cabernet Franc
- Cabernet Sauvignon
- Carignan
- Cinsaut
- Malbec
- Douce noir
- Gamay
- Grenache
- Isabella
- Merlot
- Montepulciano
- Mourvèdre
- Pinot noir
- Sangiovese
- Syrah
- Tempranillo
- Zinfandel

The next top 30 red grape varieties by acreage (listed alphabetically) are:

- Aglianico
- Blaufränkisch
- Bordô
- Carménère
- Castelão
- Concord
- Corvina Veronese
- Criolla Grande
- Croatina
- Dolcetto
- Dornfelder
- Marufo
- Mencía
- Black Muscat
- Nebbiolo
- Negroamaro
- Nero d'Avola
- Pamid
- Petit Verdot
- Pinot Meunier
- Pinotage
- Prokupac
- Ruby Cabernet
- Saperavi
- Tannat
- Tinta Barroca
- Touriga Franca
- Touriga Nacional
- Trincadeira
- Zweigelt

== Production ==
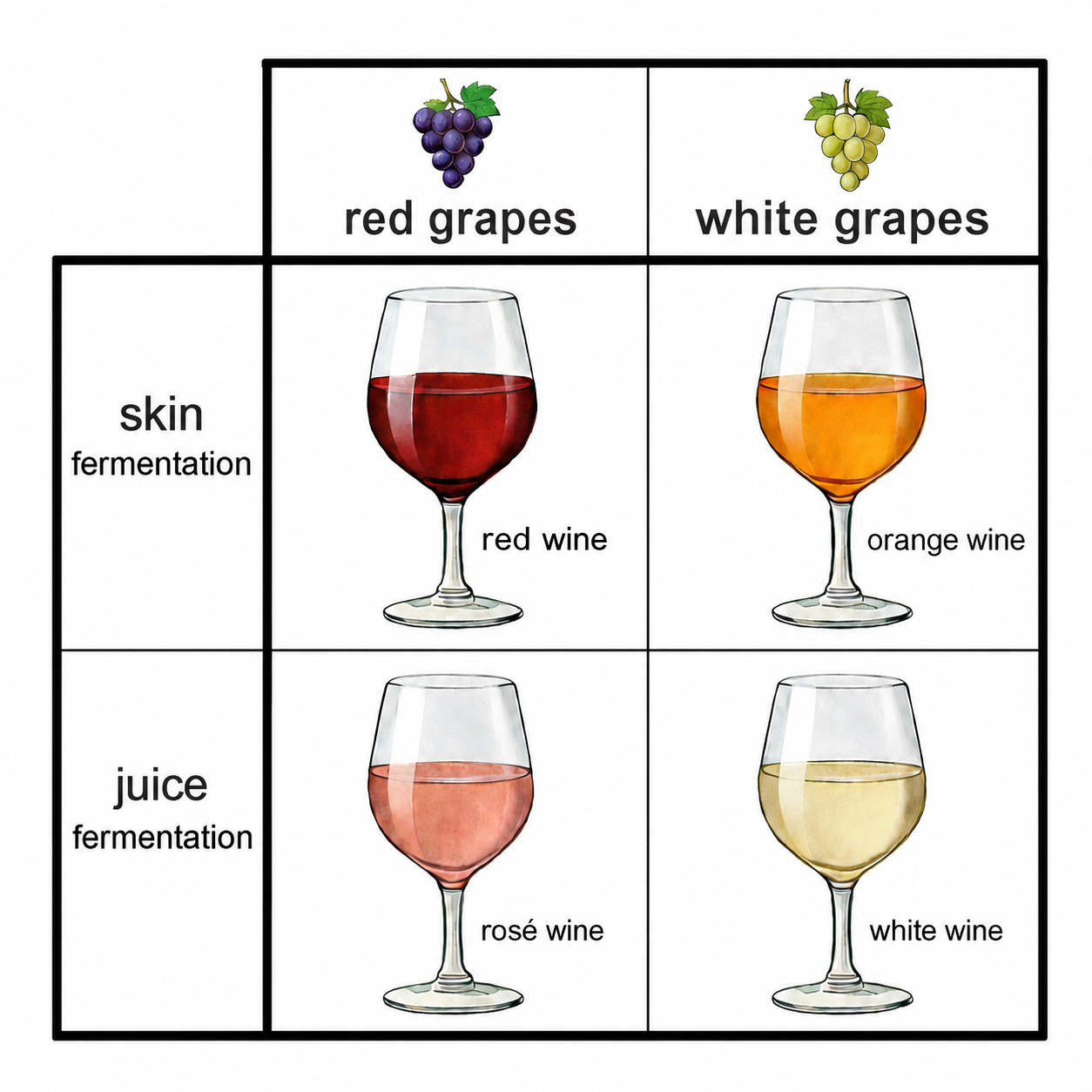
Simplified illustration of the four colors of wine – red wine, orange wine, rosé wine, white wine

=== Grape processing ===
The first step in red wine production, after picking, involves physical processing of the grapes. Handpicked or machine-harvested grapes are usually tipped into a receival bin when they arrive at the winery and conveyed by a screw mechanism to the grape-processing equipment. The removal of leaves, stems, and other debris is typically carried out at this stage to ensure the quality of the must.

=== Destemming and crushing ===
On arrival at the winery, there is usually a mixture of individual berries, whole bunches (particularly with handpicked grapes), stems, and leaves. The presence of stems during fermentation can lead to a bitter taste in the wine, and the purpose of destemming is to separate grapes from the stems and leaves. Mechanical de-stemmers usually consist of a rotating cage perforated with grape-sized holes. Within this cage is a concentric axle with arms radiating towards the inner surface of the cage. Grapes pass through the holes in the cage, while stems and leaves are expelled through the open end of the cage.

After destemming, the grapes are commonly lightly crushed. Crushers usually consist of a pair of rollers, and the gap between them can usually be regulated to allow for light, hard, or no crushing, according to the winemaker's preference.

The mixture of grapes, skins, juice, and seeds is now referred to as must. The must is then pumped to a vessel, often a tank made of stainless steel or concrete, or an oak vat, for fermentation.

In common with most modern winemaking equipment, de-stemmers and crushers are normally made of stainless steel (food-grade stainless steel for those parts that come into physical contact with the grapes).

=== Additions at reception ===
The preservative sulfur dioxide is commonly added when grapes arrive at the winery. The addition rate varies from zero, for perfectly healthy grapes, to up to 70 mg/litre, for grapes with a high percentage of rot. The purpose is to prevent oxidation and sometimes to delay the onset of fermentation.

Macerating enzymes (for instance glucanases) may also be added at this stage, to aid extraction of color and fruit flavours from the skins and to facilitate pressing.

Tannin may be added now, later in the winemaking process, or not at all. Tannin can be added to help stabilize colour, to prevent oxidation, and to help combat the effects of rot.

=== Cooling of the must ===
Some winemakers prefer to chill the must to around 10 °C (50 °F), to allow a period of pre-fermentation maceration ("cold soaking"), of between one and four days. The idea is that color and fruit flavours are extracted into the aqueous solution, without extraction of tannins which takes place in post-fermentation maceration when alcohol is present. This practice is by no means universal and is perhaps more common in New World winemaking countries.

=== Inoculation and fermentation ===
Once the must is in a fermentation vessel, yeast naturally present on the skins of the grapes, or in the environment, will sooner or later start the alcoholic fermentation, in which sugars present in the must are converted into alcohol with carbon dioxide and heat as by-products. Many winemakers, however, prefer to control the fermentation process more closely by adding specially selected yeasts usually of the species Saccharomyces ellipsoideous. Several hundred different strains of wine yeast are available commercially, and many winemakers believe that particular strains are more or less suitable for the vinification of different grape varieties and different styles of wine. It is also common to add yeast nutrient at this stage, often in the form of diammonium phosphate.

=== Pumping over ===
Soon after the must is placed in the fermentation vessel, a separation of solid and liquid phases occurs. Skins float to the surface, forming a cap. In order to encourage efficient extraction of colour and flavour components, it is important to maximize contact between the cap of skins and the liquid phase. This can be achieved by:

- pumping over (pumping liquid from the bottom of the tank and spraying it over the floating cap; normally this would be done several times per day during fermentation)
- punching down the cap (either manually or using an automated mechanical system)
- submerging the cap (the cap is kept beneath the surface of the liquid phase by a physical restraint)
- drain and return (the above techniques can all be supplemented by a drain and return operation, in which the liquid phase is drained off the skins into another vessel and then pumped back over the skins)

=== Temperature control ===
Fermentation produces heat and if left uncontrolled the temperature of the fermenting may exceed 40 °C (104 °F), which can impair flavour and even kill the yeast. The temperature is therefore often controlled using different refrigeration systems. Winemakers have different opinions about the ideal temperature for fermentation, but in general cooler temperatures (25–28 °C; 77–82 °F) produce fruitier red wines for early drinking while higher temperatures (28–35 °C; 82–95 °F) produce more tannic wines designed for long aging.

=== Following the fermentation ===
Winemakers will usually check the density and temperature of the fermenting must once or twice per day. The density is proportional to the sugar content and will be expected to fall each day as the sugar is converted into alcohol by fermentation.

=== Pressing ===
Pressing in winemaking is the process where juice is extracted from grapes. This can be done with the aid of a winepress, by hand, or even by the weight of the grape berries and clusters themselves. Historically, intact grape clusters were trodden by feet, but in most wineries today, the grapes are sent through a crusher/de-stemmer, which removes the individual grape berries from the stems and breaks the skins, releasing some juice, prior to being pressed. There are exceptions, such as the case of sparkling wine production in regions such as Champagne, where grapes are traditionally whole-cluster pressed with stems included to produce a lighter must that is low in phenolics.

In white wine production, pressing usually takes place immediately after crushing and before primary fermentation. In red wine production, the grapes are also crushed, but pressing usually does not take place till after or near the end of fermentation with the time of skin contact between the juice and grapes leaching color, tannins, and other phenolics from the skin. Approximately 60-70% of the available juice within the grape berry, the free-run juice, can be released by the crushing process and does not require the use of the press. The remaining 30-40% that comes from pressing can have higher pH levels, lower titratable acidity, potentially higher volatile acidity and higher phenolics than the free-run juice depending on the amount of pressure and tearing of the skins and will produce more astringent, bitter wine.

Winemakers often keep their free-run juice and pressed wine separate (and perhaps even further isolate the wine produced by different pressure levels/stages of pressing) during much of the winemaking process to either bottle separately or later blend portions of each to make a more complete, balanced wine. In practice the volume of many wines are made from 85 to 90% of free run juice and 10-15% pressed juice.

=== Types of presses ===
There are many different types of wine presses, but they can be broadly divided into continuous presses and tank presses. Modern winemaking tends to favour tank presses with pneumatic membranes, which squeeze the grapes more gently than continuous presses. The press wine is often kept separate from the free-run, and kept for later blending or disposing.

=== Malolactic fermentation ===
A second microbiological transformation commonly takes place after the alcoholic fermentation of red wines. This is usually referred to as malolactic fermentation (MLF), in which malic acid, naturally present in grape juice, is converted into lactic acid under the influence of bacteria (it is not strictly a fermentation). MLF is almost universally practised for red wines. It often occurs naturally, owing to the presence of lactic acid bacteria in wineries, but there are also commercially available preparations of bacteria to inoculate for MLF if necessary.

=== Racking ===
Once the MLF is complete, the red wine is usually racked (decanted) off its lees (dead yeast cells and other solids), and has sulfur dioxide preservative added to avoid oxidation and bacterial spoilage. This process also helps to naturally clarify the wine and enhance its stability by separating it from sediment.

=== Aging ===
Most red wine is aged for some period before bottling, though this can vary from a few days, in the case of Beaujolais Nouveau, to 18 months or more in the case of top Bordeaux reds. Aging can take place in stainless-steel or concrete tanks, or in small or large oak barrels. The latter impart some flavour to the wine as a function of their age and size (small, new barrels give more flavour than large, older barrels).

=== Fining and stabilization ===
Red wines sometimes undergo fining, which is designed to clarify the wine and sometimes to correct faults such as excess tannin. Fining agents include egg white and gelatin. Some red wines, particularly those designed for early drinking, are cold stabilized so as to prevent the precipitation of unsightly tartrate crystals in the bottle.

=== Filtration and bottling ===
Most wines are filtered at some stage before bottling, although some winemakers use the absence of filtration as a marketing tool. Filtration serves to make wine completely clear and to eliminate any remaining yeast cells and bacteria, which could render the bottled wine microbiologically unstable. Wine is normally put into glass bottles with cork stoppers, though aluminium screwcap closures and plastic stoppers are also common. Alternative containers such as Bag-in-Box, TetraPak and plastic bottles are also used.

== Consumption ==
In the United Kingdom, red wine consumption volume increased by 35.71% between 2001 and 2005, making it the most consumed wine in the country, accounting for over half of total wine consumption. Red wine represents 52% of total wine consumption in Spain, 55.6% in Italy in 2004, and 70% in Switzerland.

In Canada, red wine leads with a 52.3% share of total wine sales in 2004, although there are regional disparities, with Quebec favoring it even more.

Red wine is gaining market share in many countries. Although white wine remains preferred in Australia, red wine consumption is experiencing significant growth. In Japan, red wine consumption now surpasses white wine, accounting for 48% of total wine consumed compared to 43% for white wine. While red wine's market share may be increasing relative to other types of wine, overall wine consumption volume is declining in several countries. For example, wine consumption in Argentina has consistently decreased, reaching a -10% change from 2003 to 2004.

In 2013, China surpassed France and Italy to become the world's largest consumer of red wine.

== Health effects ==
Since red wine contains alcohol, it can have detrimental effects on the liver and pancreas, worsen gout symptoms, and cause strokes when drunk excessively. It is also advisable to not drink red wine during pregnancy.

It has been proposed that resveratrol, a polyphenol in red wine, might help prevent heart problems and blood clots if the wine is consumed in small amounts. However, research around heart disease is lacking and definitive conclusions can not be made with the current evidence. Research on its cancer effects is much clearer: the alcohol (a known and potent carcinogen, classified as IARC group 1) in red wine causes so much cancer that the alcohol in red wine is believed to cause 100,000 cancers for every cancer that resveratrol could hypothetically prevent.

== See also ==
- Browning in red wine
- Health effects of wine
- Storage of wine
