= 2-Methoxy-4-vinylphenol =

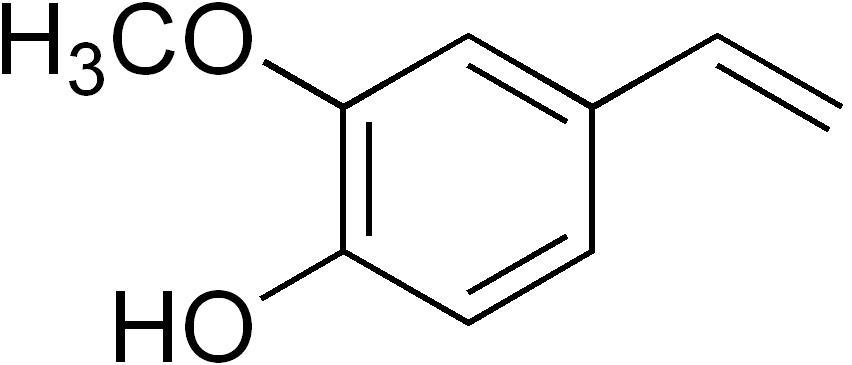

Names
- Preferred IUPAC name 4-Ethenyl-2-methoxyphenol
- Other names 4-Hydroxy-3-methoxystyrene; 4-Vinylguaiacol p-Vinylguaiacol p-Vinicatechol-o-methyl ether

Identifiers
CAS Number	7786-61-0
3D model (JSmol)	Interactive image
ChEBI	CHEBI:42438
ChemSpider	325
DrugBank	DB03514
ECHA InfoCard	100.029.183
KEGG	C17883
PubChem CID	332
UNII	DA069CTH0O
CompTox Dashboard (EPA)	DTXSID7052529
- InChI: InChI=1S/C9H10O2/c1-3-7-4-5-8(10)9(6-7)11-2/h3-6,10H,1H2,2H3 Key: YOMSJEATGXXYPX-UHFFFAOYSA-N; InChI=1/C9H10O2/c1-3-7-4-5-8(10)9(6-7)11-2/h3-6,10H,1H2,2H3 Key: YOMSJEATGXXYPX-UHFFFAOYAD
- SMILES: Oc1ccc(cc1OC)C=C

Properties
Chemical formula	C_{9}H_{10}O_{2}
Molar mass	150.177 g·mol^{−1}
Boiling point	269.35 °C (516.83 °F; 542.50 K)

Hazards
Flash point	113 °C (235 °F; 386 K)

Related compounds
Related compounds	Styrene; Guaiacol; 4-Ethylguaiacol; Catechol; 4-Vinylphenol
- Except where otherwise noted, data are given for materials in their standard state (at 25 °C [77 °F], 100 kPa). verify (what is ?) Infobox references

2-Methoxy-4-vinylphenol (also known as 4-vinyl guaiacol, 4VG) is an aromatic substance used as a flavoring agent. It is one of the compounds responsible for the natural aroma of buckwheat.

Some insects such as Rhynchophorus ferrugineus (Red palm weevil) use this substance for chemical signaling (pheromones).

The aroma of pure substance was described as: apple, spicy, peanut, wine-like or clove and curry.

Ferulic acid is converted to 4VG by certain strains of yeast, notably strains used in brewing of wheat beers, such as phenolic (POF+) strains of Saccharomyces cerevisiae (brewer's yeast) which gives beers such as Weissbier and Wit their distinctive spicy "clove" flavor. Various other microbes, including Torulaspora delbrueckii and Pseudomonas fluorescens are also able to convert ferulic acid into 4VG. Most wild strains of Saccharomyces are POF+. 4VG is considered an off-flavor in more typical types of beer, especially crisp lagers. As a result, most beer/ale strains of Saccharomyces have been selected for the inability to produce 4VG (POF-).

== See also ==
- Arene substitution pattern, for 4- vs. p-(para-) and 2- vs. o-(ortho-)
- Ferulic acid decarboxylase
- Methoxy group
- Vinyl group, also known as ethenyl group
