= P-Coumaric acid glucoside =

p-Coumaric acid glucoside
- Skeletal formula of p-coumaric acid glucoside trans glucoside

Names
- IUPAC name (2E)-3-[4-(β-D-Glucopyranosyloxy)phenyl]prop-2-enoic acid
- Systematic IUPAC name (2E)-3-(4-{[(2S,3R,4S,5S,6R)-3,4,5-Trihydroxy-6-(hydroxymethyl)oxan-2-yl]oxy}phenyl)prop-2-enoic acid
- Other names p-Coumaric acid 4-O-glucoside

Identifiers
CAS Number	14364-05-7
3D model (JSmol)	Interactive image
ChemSpider	8016010
PubChem CID	9840292
UNII	7ABG62Y8UG
CompTox Dashboard (EPA)	DTXSID101030453
- InChI: InChI=1S/C15H18O8/c16-7-10-12(19)13(20)14(21)15(23-10)22-9-4-1-8(2-5-9)3-6-11(17)18/h1-6,10,12-16,19-21H,7H2,(H,17,18)/b6-3+/t10-,12-,13+,14-,15-/m1/s1 Key: LJFYQZQUAULRDF-FDGSXQGBSA-N; InChI=1/C15H18O8/c16-7-10-12(19)13(20)14(21)15(23-10)22-9-4-1-8(2-5-9)3-6-11(17)18/h1-6,10,12-16,19-21H,7H2,(H,17,18)/b6-3+/t10-,12-,13+,14-,15-/m1/s1 Key: LJFYQZQUAULRDF-FDGSXQGBBA
- SMILES: C1=CC(=CC=C1/C=C/C(=O)O)O[C@H]2[C@@H]([C@H]([C@@H]([C@H](O2)CO)O)O)O

Properties
Chemical formula	C_{15}H_{18}O_{8}
Molar mass	326.301 g·mol^{−1}
- Except where otherwise noted, data are given for materials in their standard state (at 25 °C [77 °F], 100 kPa). Infobox references

p-Coumaric acid glucoside is a hydroxycinnamic acid, an organic compound found in commercial breads containing flaxseed.

== Biosynthesis ==
The glucoside is produced by enzymes which add a glucose unit from UDP-glucose to the parent p-coumaric acid. The cis and trans isomers have enzymes specific to each. Thus hydroxycinnamate 4-beta-glucosyltransferase characterised from tomato gives the trans form:

p-Coumaric acid
+ UDP-glucose
trans glucoside

However, cis-p-coumarate glucosyltransferase in Sphagnum fallax gives the cis equivalent:

cis-p-coumaric acid
+ UDP-glucose
UDP
cis glucoside
