= OR11H4 =

Protein-coding gene in the species Homo sapiens

Identifiers
- Aliases: OR11H4, OR14-36, olfactory receptor family 11 subfamily H member 4
- External IDs: MGI: 3030583; GeneCards: OR11H4

Gene location (Human)
Chr.	Chromosome 14 (human)
Band	14q11.2	Start	20,239,286 bp
Band	14q11.2	End	20,244,349 bp

Gene location (Mouse)
Chr.	Chromosome 14 (mouse)
Band	14|14 C1	Start	50,973,628 bp
Band	14|14 C1	End	50,982,551 bp
RNA expression pattern
Bgee	Human / Mouse (ortholog); Top expressed in: muscle of thigh; superior frontal gyrus; endometrium; caudate nucleus / Top expressed in: embryo; More reference expression data
BioGPS	n/a
Gene ontology
Molecular function	G protein-coupled receptor activity; olfactory receptor activity; signal transducer activity; G protein-coupled serotonin receptor activity; neurotransmitter receptor activity
Cellular component	integral component of membrane; plasma membrane; membrane; integral component of plasma membrane; dendrite
Biological process	sensory perception of smell; detection of chemical stimulus involved in sensory perception of smell; signal transduction; response to stimulus; G protein-coupled serotonin receptor signaling pathway; G protein-coupled receptor signaling pathway; G protein-coupled receptor signaling pathway, coupled to cyclic nucleotide second messenger; chemical synaptic transmission
Sources:Amigo / QuickGO
Orthologs
Databases	NCBI: entry; OMA: entry
Species	Human	Mouse
Entrez	390442	56858
Ensembl	ENSG00000176198	ENSMUSG00000059069
UniProt	Q8NGC9	E9Q438
RefSeq (mRNA)	NM_001004479	NM_020288
RefSeq (protein)	NP_001004479	NP_064684
Location (UCSC)	Chr 14: 20.24 – 20.24 Mb	Chr 14: 50.97 – 50.98 Mb
PubMed search
- Wikidata
View/Edit Human	View/Edit Mouse

Olfactory receptor 11H4 is a protein that in humans is encoded by the OR11H4 gene.

Olfactory receptors interact with odorant molecules in the nose, to initiate a neuronal response that triggers the perception of a smell. The olfactory receptor proteins are members of a large family of G-protein-coupled receptors (GPCR) arising from single coding-exon genes. Olfactory receptors share a 7-transmembrane domain structure with many neurotransmitter and hormone receptors and are responsible for the recognition and G protein-mediated transduction of odorant signals. The olfactory receptor gene family is the largest in the genome. The nomenclature assigned to the olfactory receptor genes and proteins for this organism is independent of other organisms.

== Ligands ==
- Isovaleric acid

== See also ==
- Olfactory receptor
