= Brettanomyces claussenii =

Scientific classification
- Kingdom: Fungi
- Division: Ascomycota
- Class: Saccharomycetes
- Order: Saccharomycetales
- Family: Pichiaceae
- Genus: Brettanomyces
- Species: B. claussenii

Binomial name
- Brettanomyces claussenii Custers

Species of fungus

Brettanomyces claussenii (anamorph of Dekkera claussenii) is a wild yeast of the genus Brettanomyces which has a negative Pasteur effect. It and Brettanomyces anomalus share identical mtDNA. In the wild, it is found on the skins of fruit. It has been shown to be useful for wine and beer fermentation as well as ethanol production.

== History ==
In 1889, Seyffert of the Kalinkin Brewery in St.Petersburg was the first to isolate a "Torula" from English beer which produced the typical "English" taste in lager beer, and in 1899 JW Tullo at Guinness described two types of "secondary yeast" in Irish stout. However, N. Hjelte Claussen at the Carlsberg brewery was the first to publish a description in 1904, following a 1903 patent (UK patent GB190328184A) that was the first patented microorganism in history. Claussen named the genus Brettanomyces, which is Greek for British Fungus. For the most part Brettanomyces is viewed as a contaminant, as it forms compounds that lead to 'off-flavors in both wine and beer. However, several wines and beers use strains of Brettanomyces in low concentrations in order to achieve the desired taste.

Brettanomyces claussenii is used for brewing beer. Originally isolated from strong English stock beer, it is a key component in some Belgian ales and sour beers. It is said that fermentation with Brettanomyces claussenii will help a beer achieve English character.

An alternative theory is that Professor Claussen named Brettanomyces after his 'beloved' Brittany, not Britain.

== Taxonomy ==
Brettanomyces claussenii is a yeast in the kingdom fungi, the phylum ascomycota and the subphylum saccharomycotina, the so-called true yeasts. Yeasts in this subphylum reproduce asexually through budding. Baker's yeast and Brewer's yeast are in saccharomycotina as well.

The genus Dekkera can be used interchangeably with Brettanomyces when describing species; Dekkera are the teleomorphic (spore-forming) versions of the Brettanomyces species. Dekkera claussenii differs from other Dekkera species in its lack of blastesis and inability to ferment lactose.

Examination of the Mitochondrial DNA of the genus Brettanomyces showed identical genomes in three pairs of species: Dekkera bruxellensis/Brettanomyces lambicus, Brettanomyces abstinens/Brettanomyces custerianus and Brettanomyces anomalus/Brettanomyces clausenii. It is suspected that the genus Dekkera has similar taxonomical redundancies.

== Uses ==
Brettanomyces claussenii is used for a variety of purposes. As a yeast, it is able to ferment cereals and fruits to produce beers and wines with unique flavor profiles. Brettanomyces claussenii can ferment a variety of other substances as well.

Ethanol fuel is becoming more prevalent as an alternative fuel source for automobiles. Using waste wood and agricultural residue is one way to produce ethanol without using crops that could potentially be food sources, such as corn. Combined with Pichia Stipitis R, Brettanomyces claussenii has been shown to produce ethanol from lignocellusic material. The material is prehydrolysed with sulfur dioxide and then simultaneously saccharified and fermented. This fermentation is rapid and efficient, producing between 360 and 370 liters of ethanol per ton of prehydrolysed lignocellulosic material. However, Brettanomyces claussenii is unable to convert lactose to ethanol, like several other yeasts can.

In clusters of Brettanomyces claussenii a negative pasteur effect has been demonstrated. The rate of alcohol fermentation is reduced under anaerobic conditions and stimulated by the presence atmospheric oxygen. The fermentation rate is sensitive to alkali concentrations. For example, a heavily potassium solution will increase the rate of fermentation while increasing sodium will slow the processes.

== See also ==
- Yeast in winemaking
