= Vinylphenol reductase =

- EC no.: ?

Vinylphenol reductase is an enzyme that catalyses the reaction :

4-vinylphenol + NAD^{+} + 3 H^{+} ⇔ 4-ethylphenol + NADH

It is found in Brettanomyces bruxellensis, a yeast responsible of the presence of ethyl phenols in wine formed from p-coumaric acid.

== See also ==
- Wine chemistry
- Yeast in winemaking
