= Poly(4-vinylphenol) =

Names
- IUPAC name Poly[1-(4-hydroxyphenyl)ethylene]
- Other names Poly(4-hydroxystyrene); Polyvinylphenol; PVP

Identifiers
CAS Number	24979-70-2

Properties
Chemical formula	(C_{8}H_{8}O)_{n}
Molar mass	Variable
- Except where otherwise noted, data are given for materials in their standard state (at 25 °C [77 °F], 100 kPa). Infobox references

Poly(4-vinylphenol), also called polyvinylphenol or PVP, is a plastic structurally similar to polystyrene. It is produced from the monomer 4-vinylphenol, which is also referred to as 4-hydroxystyrene.

PVP is used in electronics as a dielectric layer in organic transistors in organic TFT LCD displays. Thin films of cross-linked PVP can be used in this application, often in combination with pentacene. By varying the dielectric properties of PVP, the field-effect mobility of the TFTs can be tuned. Other applications include its use in photoresist materials, dielectric materials for energy storage, water-resistant adhesives and antimicrobial coatings. PVP, when mixed with a polyelectrolyte, has been demonstrated to moderately inhibit the growth of microorganisms. PVP has also been employed in gas sensors, such as by mixing polymer-carbon black with PVP to analyse organic solvents. PVP brushes are able to sense toxic gases such as hydrogen sulfide with microgravimetric techniques. Molecularly Imprinted Poly-4-vinylphenol can be produced for the selective electrochemical detection of small molecules, such as cotinine or nicotine.

PVP is typically prepared by free radical polymerization of 4-vinylphenol or a protected form of 4-vinylphenol. The protected monomers can be prepared from 4-hydroxybenzaldehyde, by vinylation of phenols, or acylation of polystyrene followed by oxidation at room temperature. If poly(4-methoxystyrene) is produced, the methoxy group can be cleaved by treating it with trimethylsilyliodide. There are several patents on the synthesis of 4-hydroxystyrene due its importance in the development of photoresist materials. RAFT polymerization can be used to prepare well-defined PVP chains. This can be done by mediating free radical polymerization of acetoxystyrene, which is then followed by deacetylation. Nitroxide mediated polymerization can also be used to prepare polyacetoxystyrene, which can transformed in polyphenols by UV irradiation. ATRP can also be used for the preparation of defined block copolymers of PVP, by polymerization of 4-acetoxystyrene that is subsequently selectively hydrolysed.

== See also ==
- 4-Vinylphenol
