= Trans-cinnamate 4-monooxygenase =

Class of enzymes

Identifiers
- EC no.: 1.14.14.91
- CAS no.: 9077-75-2

Databases
- IntEnz: IntEnz view
- BRENDA: BRENDA entry
- ExPASy: NiceZyme view
- KEGG: KEGG entry
- MetaCyc: metabolic pathway
- PRIAM: profile
- PDB structures: RCSB PDB PDBe PDBsum
- Gene Ontology: AmiGO / QuickGO
Search
- PMC: articles
- PubMed: articles
- NCBI: proteins

Trans-cinnamate 4-monooxygenase (EC 1.14.14.91) is an enzyme that catalyzes the chemical reaction

Cinnamic acid
+ NADPH + H^{+}
O_{2}
H_{2}O
p-Coumaric acid
+ NADP^{+}

The four substrates of this enzyme are cinnamic acid, reduced nicotinamide adenine dinucleotide phosphate (NADPH), oxygen, and a proton. Its products are p-coumaric acid, oxidised NADP^{+}, and water. It participates in phenylalanine metabolism and phenylpropanoid biosynthesis, especially of flavonoids in plants.

The enzyme is a cytochrome P450 protein containing heme. It requires a partner cytochrome P450 reductase for functional expression. This uses nicotinamide adenine dinucleotide phosphate (NADPH).

== Nomenclature ==
The systematic name of this enzyme class is trans-cinnamate,NADPH:oxygen oxidoreductase (4-hydroxylating). Other names in common use include:

- cinnamic acid 4-hydroxylase,
- oxygenase, cinnamate 4-mono-,
- CA4H (gene name),
- CYP73A1 (gene name),
- cytochrome P450 cinnamate 4-hydroxylase,
- cinnamate 4-hydroxylase,
- cinnamate 4-monooxygenase,
- cinnamate hydroxylase,
- cinnamic 4-hydroxylase,
- cinnamic acid 4-monooxygenase,
- cinnamic acid p-hydroxylase,
- hydroxylase, cinnamate 4-,
- t-cinnamic acid hydroxylase,
- trans-cinnamate 4-hydroxylase, and
- trans-cinnamic acid 4-hydroxylase.
