= P v P =

Court of New Zealand

- Court: High Court of New Zealand
- Full case name: P v P
- Decided: 15 July 1957
- Citation: [1957] NZLR 854

Court membership
- Judge sitting: McGregor J

Keywords
- estoppel

P v P [1957] NZLR 854 is an often cited High Court of New Zealand case regarding promissory estoppel as far as meeting the rights are suspended and not terminated, one of the seven requirements in order for this to apply. It reinforces the English case of Tool Metal Mfg Co ltd v Tungsten Electric Co Ltd [1955] 2 All ER 657.

== Background ==
Mr and Mrs P decided to separate, and in 1935 the two entered into a separation agreement requiring the husband to pay the wife maintenance at the rate of £6 10s a month. In 1942, the wife was committed to a mental hospital, which resulted in the Public Trust being appointed her legal guardian.

Eventually, on 22 February 1952, Mr P was able to obtain a divorce from the court, with the court awarding Mrs P a token one shilling (10 cents!) a year in maintenance.

The Public Trust subsequently advised Mr P that the new divorce order cancelled the previous settlement agreement and wrote to him on 10 July 1952 saying "The Court Order which you loaned is returned with thanks. The order cancels the previous separation agreement but it will be necessary to collect the arrears of maintenance up to which the date becomes effective - namely, 22nd February, 1952."

Several years later, the Public Trust realised that this legal position was incorrect, as the original separation agreement was still legally enforceable. That being the case, the Public Trust then demanded Mr P to pay the arrears under the original agreement, which was calculated to be £346 1s 5d as of 1 August 1956.

This left Mr P in a frustrating position, as if he had known that the original separation agreement was still enforceable, he could have applied to the court to have it set aside.

The Public Trust sued Mr P in the District Court and won judgment against him. Mr P appealed.

== Decision ==
The High Court ruled that promissory estoppel applied here meaning the Public Trust were unable to enforce the agreement, as Mr P would have been able to apply to have the separation agreement set aside had it not been for the incorrect advice from the Public Trust.
