= Cis-p-Coumarate glucosyltransferase =

Enzyme

cis-p-Coumarate glucosyltransferase

Identifiers
- EC no.: 2.4.1.209

Databases
- IntEnz: IntEnz view
- BRENDA: BRENDA entry
- ExPASy: NiceZyme view
- KEGG: KEGG entry
- MetaCyc: metabolic pathway
- PRIAM: profile
- PDB structures: RCSB PDB PDBe PDBsum
- Gene Ontology: AmiGO / QuickGO
Search
- PMC: articles
- PubMed: articles
- NCBI: proteins

cis-p-Coumarate glucosyltransferase (EC 2.4.1.209) is an enzyme that catalyzes the chemical reaction

cis-p-coumaric acid
+ UDP-glucose
UDP
4'-O-β-D-glucosyl-cis-p-coumaric acid

The two substrates of this enzyme characterised from Sphagnum fallax are cis-p-coumaric acid and UDP-glucose. Its products are p-coumaric acid glucoside (4'-O-beta-D-glucosyl-cis-p-coumaric acid) and uridine diphosphate (UDP).

This enzyme belongs to the family of glycosyltransferases, specifically the hexosyltransferases. The systematic name of this enzyme class is UDP-glucose:cis-p-coumarate beta-D-glucosyltransferase.
