= Testosterone isovalerate =

Chemical compound

Clinical data
- Other names: Testosterone isopentanoate; Testosterone 17β-isovalerate; Androst-4-en-17β-ol-3-one 17β-isovalerate
- Routes of administration: Intramuscular injection

Identifiers
- IUPAC name: (1S,2R,10R,11S,14S,15S)-2,15-Dimethyl-5-oxotetracyclo[8.7.0.0^{2,7}.0^{11,15}]heptadec-6-en-14-yl 3-methylbutanoate
- CAS Number: 21549-53-1
- PubChem CID: 165360205
- ChemSpider: 58838617
- CompTox Dashboard (EPA): DTXSID101336958

Chemical and physical data
- Formula: C_{24}H_{36}O_{3}
- Molar mass: 372.549 g·mol^{−1}
- 3D model (JSmol): Interactive image
- SMILES: CC(C)CC(=O)O[C@H]1CC[C@H]2[C@@H]3CCC4=CC(=O)CC[C@]4(C)[C@H]3CC[C@]12C
- InChI: InChI=1S/C24H36O3/c1-15(2)13-22(26)27-21-8-7-19-18-6-5-16-14-17(25)9-11-23(16,3)20(18)10-12-24(19,21)4/h14-15,18-21H,5-13H2,1-4H3/t18-,19-,20-,21-,23?,24?/m0/s1; Key:MTDSXXUEXHCLTL-PKLKGOOFSA-N

Testosterone isovalerate, also known as testosterone isopentanoate, testosterone 17β-isovalerate, and androst-4-en-17β-ol-3-one 17β-isovalerate, is a synthetic, injected anabolic-androgenic steroid (AAS) and an androgen ester – specifically, the C17β isovalerate (isopentanoate) ester of testosterone – which was never marketed. It is a prodrug of testosterone and, when administered via intramuscular injection, is associated with a long-lasting depot effect and extended duration of action.

== See also ==
- Testosterone isobutyrate
- Testosterone isocaproate
- Testosterone valerate
