= Isovaleric acid =

Carboxylic acid (CH3)2CHCH2CO2H

- Skeletal formula of 3-methylbutanoic acid

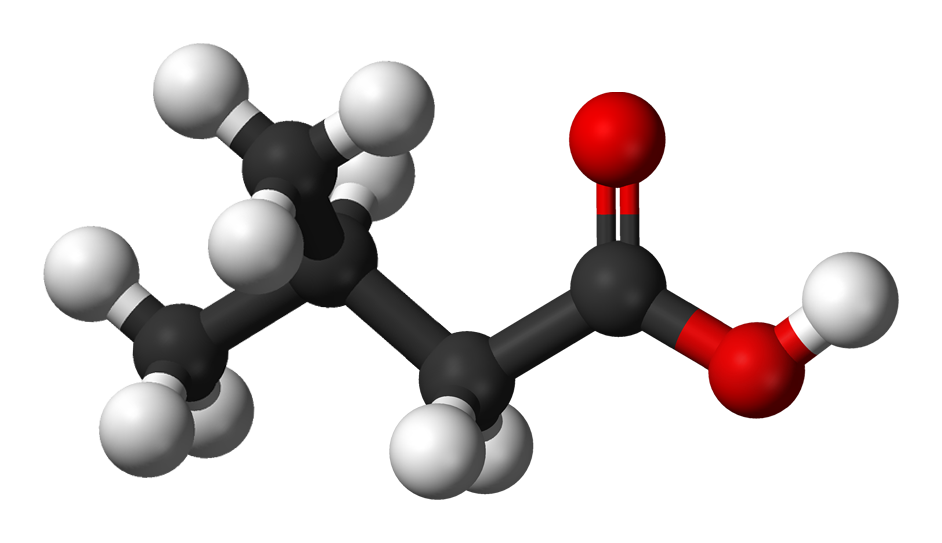
- Ball-and-stick model of 3-methylbutanoic acid

Names
- Preferred IUPAC name 3-Methylbutanoic acid
- Other names Delphinic acid 3-Methylbutyric acid Isopentanoic acid Isovaleric acid

Identifiers
CAS Number	503-74-2
3D model (JSmol)	Interactive image
ChEBI	CHEBI:28484
ChEMBL	ChEMBL568737
ChemSpider	10001
DrugBank	DB03750
ECHA InfoCard	100.007.251
EC Number	207-975-3
KEGG	C08262
PubChem CID	10430
UNII	1BR7X184L5
CompTox Dashboard (EPA)	DTXSID5029182
- InChI: InChI=1S/C5H10O2/c1-4(2)3-5(6)7/h4H,3H2,1-2H3,(H,6,7) Key: GWYFCOCPABKNJV-UHFFFAOYSA-N; InChI=1/C5H10O2/c1-4(2)3-5(6)7/h4H,3H2,1-2H3,(H,6,7) Key: GWYFCOCPABKNJV-UHFFFAOYAV
- SMILES: O=C(O)CC(C)C

Properties
Chemical formula	C_{5}H_{10}O_{2}
Molar mass	102.13 g/mol
Density	0.925 g/cm^{3}
Melting point	−29 °C (−20 °F; 244 K)
Boiling point	176.5 °C (349.7 °F; 449.6 K)
log P	1.16
Acidity (pK_{a})	4.8 (H_{2}O)
Magnetic susceptibility (χ)	−67.7·10^{−6} cm^{3}/mol

Related compounds
Related carboxylic acids	butyric acid β-hydroxybutyric acid β-hydroxy β-methylbutyric acid
Related compounds	Valeric acid

Hazards
- GHS labelling
Pictograms	(GHS05: Corrosive)
Signal word	Danger
Hazard statements	H314
Precautionary statements	P280, P301+P330+P331, P303+P361+P353, P304+P340+P310, P305+P351+P338, P363
Flash point	80 °C (176 °F; 353 K)
- Except where otherwise noted, data are given for materials in their standard state (at 25 °C [77 °F], 100 kPa). Infobox references

Isovaleric acid, also known as 3-methylbutanoic acid or β-methylbutyric acid, is a branched-chain alkyl carboxylic acid with the chemical formula (CH_{3})_{2}CHCH_{2}CO_{2}H. It is classified as a short-chain fatty acid. Like other low-molecular-weight carboxylic acids, it has an unpleasant odor. The compound occurs naturally and can be found in many foods, such as cheese, soy milk, and apple juice.

== History ==
3-Methylbutanoic acid is a minor constituent of the perennial flowering plant valerian (Valeriana officinalis), from which it got its trivial name isovaleric acid: an isomer of valeric acid which shares its unpleasant odor. The dried root of this plant has been used medicinally since antiquity. Their chemical identity was first investigated in the 19th century by oxidation of the components of fusel alcohol, which includes the five-carbon amyl alcohols.

== Manufacture ==
In industry, 3-methylbutanoic acid is produced by the hydroformylation of isobutylene with syngas, forming isovaleraldehyde, which is oxidised to the final product.

(CH_{3})_{2}C=CH_{2} + H_{2} + CO → (CH_{3})_{2}CHCH_{2}CHO → 3-methylbutanoic acid

== Reactions ==
3-Methylbutanoic acid reacts as a typical carboxylic acid: it can form amide, ester, anhydride, and chloride derivatives. The acid chloride is commonly used as the intermediate to obtain the others. The acid has been used to synthesize β-hydroxyisovaleric acid – otherwise known as β-hydroxy β-methylbutyric acid – via microbial oxidation by the fungus Galactomyces reessii.

Alternative syntheses of β-hydroxy β-methylbutyric acid

== Uses ==
Isovaleric acid has a strong pungent cheesy or sweaty smell, but its volatile esters such as ethyl isovalerate have pleasant odors and are widely used in perfumery. It is also the primary flavor added to wine when made using Brettanomyces yeasts. Other compounds produced by Brettanomyces yeasts include 4-ethylphenol, 4-vinylphenol, and 4-ethylguaiacol. An excess of isovaleric acid in wine is generally seen as a defect, as it can smell sweaty, leathery, or "like a barnyard", but in small amounts it can smell smokey, spicy, or medicinal. These phenomena may be prevented by killing any Brettanomyces yeasts, such as by sterile filtration, by the addition of relatively large quantities of sulfur dioxide and sometimes sorbic acid, by mixing in alcoholic spirit to give a fortified wine of sufficient strength to kill all yeast and bacteria, or by pasteurization. Isovaleric acid can also be found in beer, and, excepting some English–style ales, is usually considered a flaw. It can be produced by the oxidation of hop resins, or by Brettanomyces yeasts present.

The compound's safety as a food additive was reviewed by an FAO and WHO panel, who concluded that there were no concerns at the likely levels of intake.

== Biology ==
Since isovaleric acid and its esters are natural components of many foods, it is present in mammals including humans. Also, Isovaleryl-coenzyme A is an intermediate in the metabolism of branched-chain amino acids.

Isovaleric acid is a major component of the cause of intense foot odor, as it is produced by skin bacteria metabolizing leucine and in rare cases a condition called isovaleric acidemia can lead to heightened levels of this metabolite.

== Salts and esters ==
An isovalerate or 3-methylbutanoate ion is (CH_{3})_{2}CHCH_{2}COO^{−}, the conjugate base of the acid. It is the form found in biological systems at physiological pH. An isovalerate or 3-methylbutanoate compound is a salt or ester of the acid.

=== Examples ===
- Ethyl isovalerate
- Menthyl isovalerate
- Isovaleryl-CoA
- Testosterone isovalerate

== See also ==
- 2-Methylbutanoic acid, an isomer
- Valeric acid, an isomer
