= 4-Ethylguaiacol =

Names
- Preferred IUPAC name 4-Ethyl-2-methoxyphenol
- Other names p-Ethylguaiacol; Homocresol; Guaiacyl ethane 2-Methoxy-4-ethylphenol

Identifiers
CAS Number	2785-89-9
3D model (JSmol)	Interactive image
ChemSpider	56245
ECHA InfoCard	100.018.637
PubChem CID	62465
UNII	C9NFD83BJ5
CompTox Dashboard (EPA)	DTXSID0047038
- InChI: InChI=1S/C9H12O2/c1-3-7-4-5-8(10)9(6-7)11-2/h4-6,10H,3H2,1-2H3 Key: CHWNEIVBYREQRF-UHFFFAOYSA-N; InChI=1/C9H12O2/c1-3-7-4-5-8(10)9(6-7)11-2/h4-6,10H,3H2,1-2H3 Key: CHWNEIVBYREQRF-UHFFFAOYAE
- SMILES: Oc1ccc(cc1OC)CC

Properties
Chemical formula	C_{9}H_{12}O_{2}
Molar mass	152.193 g·mol^{−1}
Appearance	Colorless liquid
Density	1064 kg/m^{3} (20 °C)
Melting point	15 °C (59 °F; 288 K)
Boiling point	235.1 °C (455.2 °F; 508.2 K)

Hazards
- GHS labelling
Pictograms	(GHS07: Exclamation mark)
Signal word	Warning
Hazard statements	H315, H319, H335
Precautionary statements	P302+P352, P305+P351+P338
NFPA 704 (fire diamond)	2 1 0
Safety data sheet (SDS)	External MSDS
- Except where otherwise noted, data are given for materials in their standard state (at 25 °C [77 °F], 100 kPa). verify (what is ?) Infobox references

4-Ethylguaiacol, often abbreviated to 4-EG, is a phenolic compound with the molecular formula C_{9}H_{12}O_{2} that's a key aromatic component in various products, from food and beverages to cosmetics and pharmaceuticals. It can be produced in wine and beer by Brettanomyces. It is also frequently present in bio-oil produced by pyrolysis of lignocellulosic biomass.

== Winemaking ==
It is produced along with 4-ethylphenol (4-EP) in wine and beer by the spoilage yeast Brettanomyces. When it is produced by the yeast to concentrations greater than the sensory threshold of >600 μg/L, it can contribute bacon, spice, clove, or smoky aromas to the wine. On their own these characters can be quite attractive in a wine, however as the compound usually occurs with 4-EP whose aromas can be more aggressive, the presence of the compound often signifies a wine fault. The ratio in which 4-EP and 4-EG are present can greatly affect the organoleptic properties of the wine.

== Bio-oil ==
4-Ethylguaiacol can also be produced by pyrolysis of lignocellulosic biomass. It is produced from the lignin, along with many of the other phenolic compounds present in bio-oil. In particular, 4-ethylguaiacol is derived from guaiacyl in the lignin.

== See also ==
- Yeast in winemaking
- Wine chemistry
