= P-Coumaric acid =

p-Coumaric acid
- Skeletal formula of p-coumaric acid

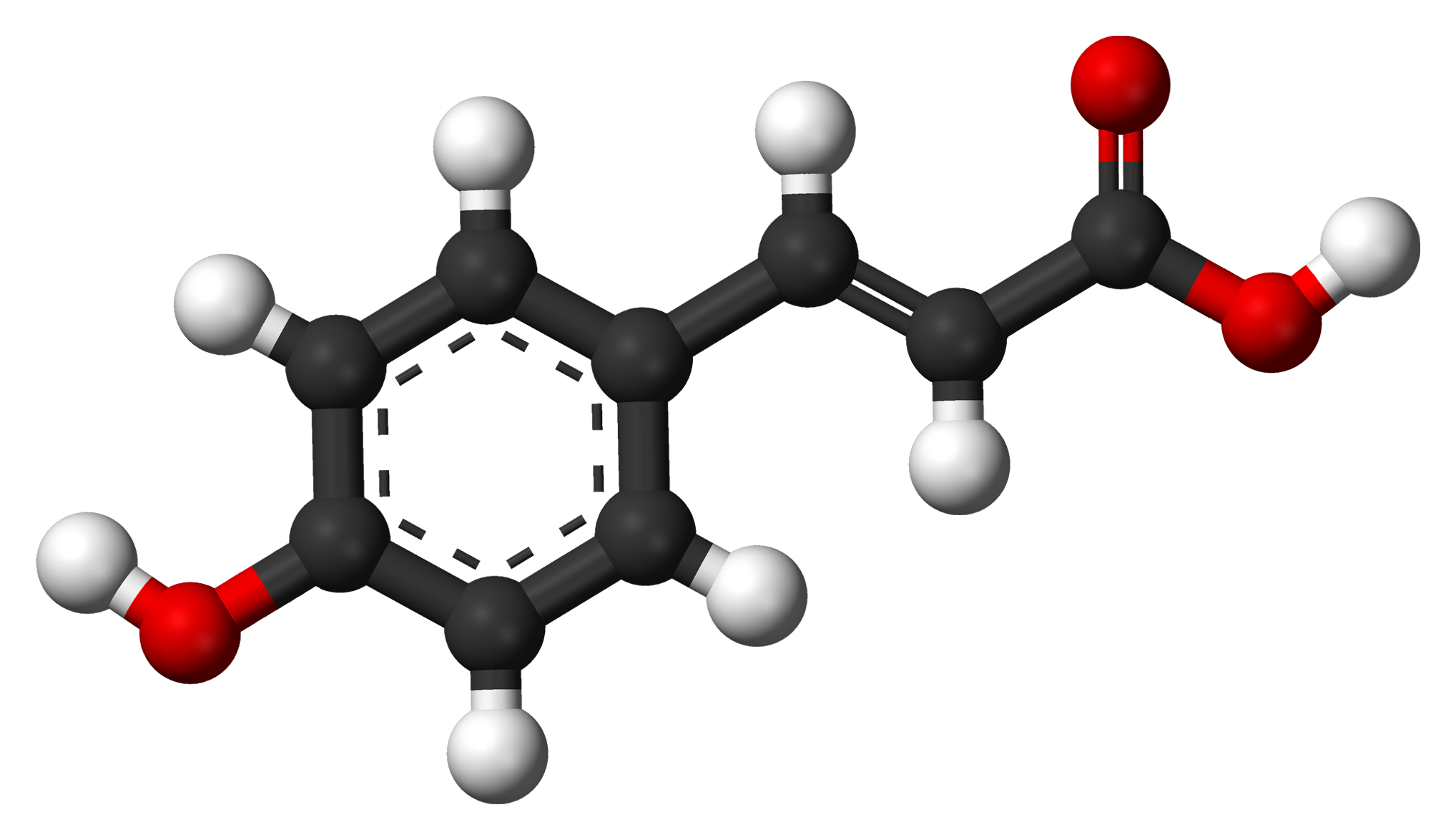
- Ball-and-stick model of p-coumaric acid

Names
- Preferred IUPAC name (2E)-3-(4-Hydroxyphenyl)prop-2-enoic acid
- Other names (E)-3-(4-Hydroxyphenyl)-2-propenoic acid (E)-3-(4-Hydroxyphenyl)acrylic acid para-Coumaric acid 4-Hydroxycinnamic acid trans-4-Hydroxycinnamic acid β-(4-Hydroxyphenyl)acrylic acid

Identifiers
CAS Number	501-98-4
3D model (JSmol)	Interactive image; Interactive image
Beilstein Reference	2207383
ChEBI	CHEBI:32374
ChEMBL	ChEMBL66879
ChemSpider	553148
DrugBank	DB04066
ECHA InfoCard	100.116.210
EC Number	231-000-0
Gmelin Reference	2245630
IUPHAR/BPS	5787
KEGG	C00811
PubChem CID	637542
UNII	IBS9D1EU3J
CompTox Dashboard (EPA)	DTXSID30901076
- InChI: InChI=1S/C9H8O3/c10-8-4-1-7(2-5-8)3-6-9(11)12/h1-6,10H,(H,11,12)/b6-3+ Key: NGSWKAQJJWESNS-ZZXKWVIFSA-N; InChI=1/C9H8O3/c10-8-4-1-7(2-5-8)3-6-9(11)12/h1-6,10H,(H,11, 12)/b6-3+/f/h11H; InChI=1/C9H8O3/c10-8-4-1-7(2-5-8)3-6-9(11)12/h1-6,10H,(H,11,12)/b6-3+ Key: NGSWKAQJJWESNS-ZZXKWVIFBJ
- SMILES: C1=CC(=CC=C1\C=C\C(=O)O)O; c1cc(ccc1/C=C/C(=O)O)O

Properties
Chemical formula	C_{9}H_{8}O_{3}
Molar mass	164.160 g·mol^{−1}
Melting point	210 to 213 °C (410 to 415 °F; 483 to 486 K)

Hazards
- GHS labelling
Pictograms	(GHS07: Exclamation mark)
Signal word	Danger
Hazard statements	H315, H319, H335
Precautionary statements	P261, P264, P271, P280, P302+P352, P305+P351+P338
- Except where otherwise noted, data are given for materials in their standard state (at 25 °C [77 °F], 100 kPa). Infobox references

p-Coumaric acid is an organic compound with the formula HOC_{6}H_{4}CH=CHCO_{2}H. It is one of the three isomers of coumaric acid. It is a white solid that is only slightly soluble in water but very soluble in ethanol and diethyl ether.

== Natural occurrences ==
It is a precursor to many natural products, especially lignols, precursors to the woody mass that comprise many plants. Of the myriad occurrences, p-coumaric acid can be found in Gnetum cleistostachyum.

=== In food ===
p-Coumaric acid can be found in a wide variety of edible plants and fungi such as peanuts, navy beans, tomatoes, carrots, basil and garlic. It is found in wine and vinegar. It is also found in barley grain.

p-Coumaric acid from pollen is a constituent of honey.

=== Derivatives ===
p-Coumaric acid glucoside can also be found in commercial breads containing flaxseed. Diesters of p-coumaric acid can be found in carnauba wax.

=== Biosynthesis ===
It is biosynthesized from cinnamic acid by the action of the P450-dependent enzyme 4-cinnamic acid hydroxylase (C4H).

$$\begin{matrix}{}\\\xrightarrow\mathrm{C4H}\\{}\end{matrix}$$

It is also produced from L-tyrosine by the action of tyrosine ammonia lyase (TAL).

$\xrightarrow\mathrm{TAL}$ + NH_{3} + H^{+}

=== Biosynthetic building block ===
p-Coumaric acid is the precursor of 4-ethylphenol produced by the yeast Brettanomyces in wine. The enzyme cinnamate decarboxylase catalyzes the conversion of p-coumaric acid into 4-vinylphenol. Vinyl phenol reductase then catalyzes the reduction of 4-vinylphenol to 4-ethylphenol. Coumaric acid is sometimes added to microbiological media, enabling the positive identification of Brettanomyces by smell.

The conversion of p-coumaric acid to 4-ethyphenol by Brettanomyces

cis-p-Coumarate glucosyltransferase is an enzyme that uses UDP-glucose and cis-p-coumaric acid to produce 4′-O-β-D-glucosyl-cis-p-coumaric acid and uridine diphosphate (UDP). This enzyme belongs to the family of glycosyltransferases, specifically the hexosyltransferases.

cis-p-coumaric acid
+ UDP-glucose
UDP
4'-O-β-D-glucosyl-cis-p-coumaric acid

Phloretic acid, found in the rumen of sheep fed with dried grass, is produced by hydrogenation of the 2-propenoic side chain of p-coumaric acid.

The enzyme, resveratrol synthase, also known as stilbene synthase, catalyzes the synthesis of resveratrol ultimately from a tetraketide derived from 4-coumaroyl CoA.

p-Coumaric acid is a cofactor of photoactive yellow proteins (PYP), a homologous group of proteins found in many eubacteria.

p-Coumaric acid is found as the base moiety of caleicine, one of many sesquiterpenes in Calea ternifolia.

== See also ==
- o-coumaric acid
- m-coumaric acid
- Coumarin
- Coumaroyl-Coenzyme A
- Ferulic acid
- Cinnamic acid
- Phenolic content in wine
- p-Coumaroylated anthocyanins
