= Enologix =

American winegrowing analysis company

- Formerly: McCloskey, Arrhenius and Company
- Type: privately held
- Founded: July 1989; 37 years ago
- Headquarters: Santa Cruz, California
- Area served: Argentina; California; France; Long Island; Oregon; Washington
- Key people: Dr. Leo McCloskey; Dr. Susanne Arrhenius; Dr. Marshall Sylvan; Richard Graff; Peter Michael

Enologix is a privately held California corporation that designs predictive analytics for luxury winegrowing. The company sells grape and wine quality indices, models, software and consulting products. Enologix created the first algorithms that predict grape harvest dates, grading new wines, digital blends and future market price, volume and taste scores. The most important metric among winemakers are digital blends and a taste index which predicts 100-point scores of consumer critics such as Robert Parker. It claims that the quality of wine can be measured chemically, and a score assessed, much like a wine critic. Clients include Beaulieu, Cakebread Cellars, Diamond Creek, Ridge Vineyards. Enologix's metrics have been correlated with market performance metrics, including 100-points critics' scores.

== History ==
Established in July 1989 in Santa Cruz, California, and incorporated in 2001, the company was previously named McCloskey, Arrhenius and Company for its first 4 years but changed its name to Enologix to reflect the company's expansion into luxury winemaking products for Napa Valley winemakers. Enologix is derived from Oeno, the Greek goddess of wine, and Logic, Greek for reasoning. Between 1989 and 1993 former winemaker Dr. Leo McCloskey and natural products chemist Dr. Susanne Arrhenius, both University of California-trained chemical ecologists; along with the advice of mathematician Dr. Marshall Sylvan, Stanford University, created the first mathematical model for California luxury wine market performance. It was tested with winemakers in California, Oregon, Washington, and France between 1989 and 1993, including Chalone Vineyard, Joseph Phelps Vineyards, and Ridge Vineyards in California, Rex Hill in Oregon, Canoe Ridge in Washington; and Domaines Barons Rothschild properties in Bordeaux and Chile. The most important winemaker to help Enologix was Richard Graff of Chalone Vineyard, who insisted that McCloskey prove the model with Chateau Lafite Rothchild wines. Models were developed for traditional style, taste quality and aging potential by 1993 when it was branded and trademarked Enologix and sold for the first time in February 1994 to Peter Michael Winery, Calistoga, California. It went into widespread use in the Napa Valley.

== Methods and Innovations ==
Enologix quality model has been used in Argentina, California, France, Long Island, Oregon, Washington to optimize taste quality to improve sales. Wine modeling, the task of building an abstract representation (a model) of wine price, volume and tasting scores had eluded enologists since the 1855 Classification of Bordeaux. In the 1990s, Enologix wrote the first mathematics used to compute taste quality based on statistical correlations between grape chemistry and bottled wine tasting scores. Dow Jones', Market Watch, used Enologix to exemplify how innovation by "Quants" has been extended from the financial industry to improve the Food/beverage sector Enologix approach to winemaking begins with market metrics and then linking them to a chemical breakdown of some of the flavor components of wine-including anthocyanins, norisoprenoids, phenols, tannins and terpenes-and analyzing a client's wine and possibly comparing it with a "target" wine from the companies' database which include profiles of First Growth Bordeaux wine and other high scoring bottles. Throughout the growing season, Enologix would test and track the developing components of the grapes and can use calculation to try and better gauge the optimal ripeness of the grapes to set an ideal time for harvesting.

By late 2005, McCloskey said that company had a database of more than 50,000 wines. Enologix has created the first wine informatics; which includes the science of information, the practice of information processing, and the engineering of information systems. Enologix benchmarks vineyard and winery samples to the customers competitive set of bottled wines for sale. In 2007 Enologix made the first Classification of Napa Valley American Viticultural Areas-to TASTE³ which brings together more than forty of the most compelling writers, thinkers, chefs, winemakers, journalists, artisans, and executives as speakers.

Enologix claims that by using their methodology that winemakers can predict with 95% accuracy the average critical scores within two and a half points and that with 80% accuracy they could predict the score within one and a half points. In addition, the consultation and testing that happens during the growing seasons and winemaking period can provide feedback that can help a client potentially see a 5-point increase their score over their previous years' average scores for red wines and 6 points for white wine.

== Awards and recognition ==
- voted Best 2006 Ideas by Business Week

== Criticisms of Disruptive New Model ==
Enologix solution was disruptive. Models are deterministic, with the intent of predicting market performance. Evolution of Enologix was caused due to maturation of US wine markets, as such the company added value to company financial performance. Winemakers worldwide began to use media critics’ 100-point taste quality scores to market wines for higher prices. By 1996 Enologix evolved to correlate winemakers’ to critics’ quality models. Winemakers began to use Enologix metrics to improve company performance without saying so to anyone. It was a disruptive new strategy, alternately lauded by journalists and dismissed by competing academics, but not most winemakers. By 2001 academics wanted the company to publish its—"Black Box Mathematics"—scientific methodologies, largely for reasons to compete. Wine writers supporting food section advertisers found the new model was an anathema to their expertise. A Wired Magazine story pointed out that Enologix legitimized consumer critics’ 100-point scores, which had replaced wine writers taste descriptors. Academics, such as Roger Boulton at UC-Davis, would question the methods Enologix uses and whether they actually work because Enologix has not publicly released their data and exact details of measurements. But the real issue was that no academic had published their model before Enologix. Enologix has replied to such criticism by noting that their methods are proprietary and essentially trade secrets. Another criticism leveled at Enologix is that it encourages a homogenisation of wine that matches more a wine score than reflecting the terroir of where it was made. McClosky, of Enologix, has replied to this criticism by noting the scores aid the wine drinking consumer in knowing whether or not a bottle of wine is worth the price that they are paying for the wine.

== See also ==
- Terroir
- Globalization of wine
