= Dimethyl dicarbonate =

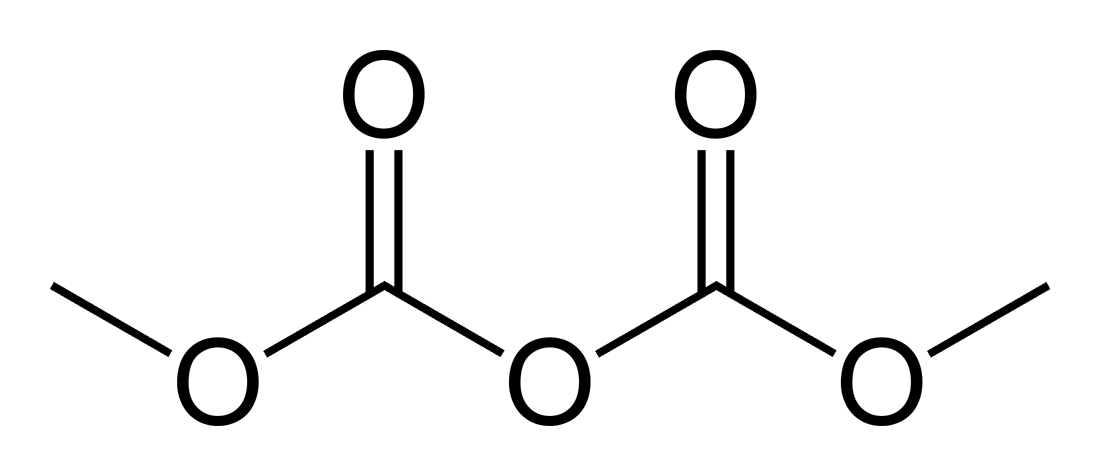
- Skeletal formula of dimethyl dicarbonate

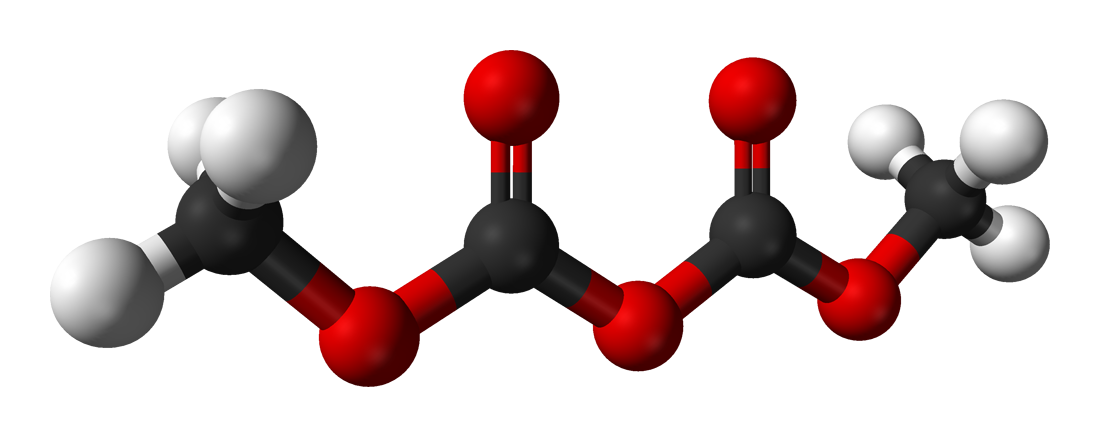

Names
- Preferred IUPAC name Dimethyl dicarbonate
- Other names DMDC; Dicarbonic acid dimethyl ester; Dimethyl pyrocarbonate; Velcorin

Identifiers
CAS Number	4525-33-1
3D model (JSmol)	Interactive image; Interactive image
ChEBI	CHEBI:173546
ChemSpider	2976
ECHA InfoCard	100.022.601
EC Number	224-859-8
E number	E242 (preservatives)
PubChem CID	3086
UNII	1AY9229ZMG
CompTox Dashboard (EPA)	DTXSID2052108
- InChI: InChI=1S/C4H6O5/c1-7-3(5)9-4(6)8-2/h1-2H3 Key: GZDFHIJNHHMENY-UHFFFAOYSA-N; InChI=1/C4H6O5/c1-7-3(5)9-4(6)8-2/h1-2H3 Key: GZDFHIJNHHMENY-UHFFFAOYAQ
- SMILES: O=C(OC(=O)OC)OC; O=C(OC)OC(=O)OC

Properties
Chemical formula	C_{4}H_{6}O_{5}
Molar mass	134.087 g·mol^{−1}
Appearance	Colorless liquid
Density	1.25 g/mL
Melting point	16 to 18 °C (61 to 64 °F; 289 to 291 K)
Boiling point	172 °C (342 °F; 445 K)
Viscosity	2.1 Pa·s (20 °C)

Hazards
- Occupational safety and health (OHS/OSH)
Main hazards	Toxic
- GHS labelling
Pictograms	(GHS02: Flammable) (GHS05: Corrosive) (GHS06: Toxic) (GHS07: Exclamation mark)
Signal word	Danger
Hazard statements	H226, H302, H312, H314, H330
Precautionary statements	P210, P233, P240, P241, P242, P243, P260, P264, P270, P271, P280, P284, P301+P312, P301+P330+P331, P302+P352, P303+P361+P353, P304+P340, P305+P351+P338, P310, P312, P320, P321, P330, P363, P370+P378, P403+P233, P403+P235, P405, P501

Related compounds
Related compounds	Dimethyl carbonate; Diethylpyrocarbonate; Di-tert-butyl dicarbonate
- Except where otherwise noted, data are given for materials in their standard state (at 25 °C [77 °F], 100 kPa). verify (what is ?) Infobox references

Dimethyl dicarbonate (DMDC) is a colorless liquid with a pungent odor at high concentration at room temperature. It is primarily used as a beverage preservative, processing aid, or sterilant (INS No. 242) being highly active against typical beverage spoiling microorganisms like yeast, bacteria, or mould.

== Usage ==
Dimethyl dicarbonate is used to stabilize beverages by preventing microbial spoilage. It can be used in various non-alcoholic as well as alcoholic drinks like wine, cider, beer-mix beverages or hard seltzers. Beverage-spoiling microbes are killed by methoxycarbonylation of proteins.

It acts by inhibiting enzymes involved in the microbial metabolism, e.g. acetate kinase and L-glutamic acid decarboxylase. It has also been proposed that DMDC inhibits the enzymes alcohol dehydrogenase and glyceraldehyde 3-phosphate dehydrogenase by causing the methoxycarbonylation of their histidine components.

In wine, it is often used to replace potassium sorbate, as it inactivates wine spoilage yeasts such as Brettanomyces. Once it has been added to beverages, the efficacy of the chemical is provided by the following reactions:

DMDC + water → methanol + carbon dioxide
DMDC + ethanol → ethyl methyl carbonate
DMDC + ammonia → methyl carbamate
DMDC + amino acid → derived carboxymethyl

The application of DMDC is particularly useful when wine needs to be sterilized but cannot be sterile filtered, pasteurized, or sulfured. DMDC is also used to stabilize non-alcoholic beverages such as carbonated or non-carbonated juice beverages, isotonic sports beverages, iced teas and flavored waters.

DMDC is added before the filling of the beverage. It then breaks down into small amounts of methanol and carbon dioxide, which are both natural constituents of fruit and vegetable juices.

The EU Scientific Committee on Food, the FDA in the United States and the JECFA of the WHO have confirmed the safe use in beverages. The FDA approved its use in wines in 1988, with the maximum level being permitted set at 200 mg/L, and only if there were fewer than 500 yeast cells/mL at time of dosage. It is also approved in the EU, where it is listed under E number E242, as well as Australia and New Zealand.
