= Sensory threshold =

Limit defining the weakest stimulus which can be sensed

In psychophysics, sensory threshold is the weakest stimulus that an organism can sense. Unless otherwise indicated, it is usually defined as the weakest stimulus that can be detected half the time, for example, as indicated by a point on a probability curve. Methods have been developed to measure thresholds in any of the senses.

Several different sensory thresholds have been defined;

- Absolute threshold: the lowest level at which a stimulus can be detected.
- Recognition threshold: the level at which a stimulus can not only be detected but also recognized.
- Differential threshold: the level at which an increase in a detected stimulus can be perceived.
- Terminal threshold: the level beyond which any increase to a stimulus no longer changes the perceived intensity.

== History ==
The first systematic studies to determine sensory thresholds were conducted by Ernst Heinrich Weber, a physiologist and pioneer of experimental psychology at the Leipzig University. His experiments were intended to determine the absolute and difference, or differential, thresholds. Weber was able to define absolute and difference threshold statistically, which led to the establishment of Weber's Law and the concept of just noticeable difference to describe threshold perception of stimuli.

Following Weber's work, Gustav Fechner, a pioneer of psychophysics, studied the relationship between the physical intensity of a stimulus and the psychologically perceived intensity of the stimulus. Comparing the measured intensity of sound waves with the perceived loudness, Fechner concluded that the intensity of a stimulus changes in proportion to the logarithm of the stimulus intensity. His findings would lead to the creation of the decibel scale.

== Measuring and testing sensory thresholds ==
Defining and measuring sensory thresholds requires setting the sensitivity limit such that the perception observations lead to the absolute threshold. The level of sensitivity is usually assumed to be constant in determining the threshold limit. There are three common methods used to determine sensory thresholds:

1. Method of Limits:
  In the first step, the subject is stimulated by strong, easily detectable stimuli that are decreased stepwise (descending sequence) until they cannot detect the stimulus. Then another stimulation sequence is applied called ascending sequence. In this sequence, stimulus intensity increases from subthreshold to easily detectable. Both sequences are repeated several times. This yields several momentary threshold values. In the following step, mean values are calculated for ascending and descending sequences separately. The mean value will be lower for descending sequences. In case of audiometry, the difference of the means in case of ascending vs. descending sequences has a diagnostic importance. In the final step, the average of the previously calculated means will result in the absolute threshold.
2. Method of constant stimuli:
  Stimuli of varying intensities are presented in random order to a subject. Intensities involve stimuli which are surely subthreshold and stimuli which are surely supra-threshold. For the creation of the series, the approximate threshold judged by a simpler method (i.e.: by the method of limits). The random sequences are presented to the subject several times. The strength of the stimulus, perceived in more than half of the presentations, will be taken as the threshold.
3. Adaptive method:
  Stimulation starts with a surely supra-threshold stimulus; then further stimuli are given with an intensity decreased in previously defined steps. The series is stopped when the stimulus strength become subthreshold (this is called the turn phenomena). Then the step is halved, and the stimulation is repeated, but now with increasing intensities, until the subject perceives the sound again. This process is repeated several times, until the step size reaches the preset minimal value. With this method, the threshold value can be delineated very accurately. The initial size of the step can be selected depending on the expected accuracy.

In measuring sensory threshold, noise must be accounted for. Signal noise is defined as the presence of extra, unwanted energy in the observational system which obscures the information of interest. As the measurements come closer to the absolute threshold, the variability of the noise increases, causing the threshold to be obscured. Different types of internal and external noise include excess stimuli, nervous system over- or under-stimulation, and conditions that falsely stimulate nerves in the absence of external stimuli.

A universal absolute threshold is difficult to define a standard because of the variability of the measurements. While sensation occurs at the physical nerves, there can be reasons why it is not consistent. Age or nerve damage can affect sensation. Similarly, psychological factors can affect perception of physical sensation. Mental state, memory, mental illness, fatigue, and other factors can alter perception.

== Aviation use ==
When related to motion in any of the possible six degrees of freedom (6-DoF), the fact that sensory thresholds exist is why it is essential that aircraft have blind-flying instruments. Sustained flight in cloud is not possible by `seat-of-the-pants' cues alone, since errors build up due to aircraft movements below the pilot's sensory threshold, ultimately leading to loss of control.

- In flight simulators with motion platforms, the motion sensory thresholds are utilised in the technique known as 'acceleration-onset cueing'. This is where a motion platform, having made the initial acceleration that is sensed by the simulator crew, the platform is re-set to approximately its neutral position by being moved at a rate below the sensory threshold and is then ready to respond to the next acceleration demanded by the simulator computer.

== See also ==
- Detection theory
- Odor detection threshold
- Perception
- Sensory analysis
