= Ugarte =

Ugarte or Uharte is a Basque word meaning "island". It can also be spelt Huarte, Hugarte or Duarte in Spanish, and Uhart, Duhart or Duharte in French. Notable people with the surname include:

- Adriana Ugarte (born 1985), Spanish actress
- Agustín Jerónimo de Iturbide y Huarte (1807–1866), Prince Imperial of Mexico
- Alfonso Ugarte (1847–1880), Peruvian military commander
- Alfredo Ugarte, Chilean hurdler
- Alirio Ugarte Pelayo (1923–1966), Venezuelan politician
- Ana Carolina Ugarte (born 1992), Venezuelan model and beauty pageant titleholder
- Andoni Ugarte (born 1995), Spanish footballer
- Augusto José Ramón Pinochet Ugarte (1915–2006), Chilean military officer and dictator
- Eduardo Ugarte (1900–1955), Spanish writer
- Francisco Ugarte (footballer, born 1959), Chilean footballer
- Francisco Ugarte (footballer, born 1986), German-Chilean footballer
- Gloria Ugarte, Argentine actress
- Jose de la Torre Ugarte (1798–1878), Peruvian lyricist
- José Humberto Ugarte (born 1980), Costa Rican footballer
- José Luis Ugarte (1928–2008), Spanish sailor
- John Huarte (born 1944), American football quarterback
- Juan de Ugarte (1662–1730), Jesuit missionary and explorer
- Juan Huarte de San Juan (c. 1530–1592), Spanish physician and psychologist
- Juan Ugarte (born 1980), Spanish footballer
- Juan Vicente Ugarte del Pino (1923–2015), Peruvian historian and jurist
- Julio Ugarte y Ugarte (1890–1949), Peruvian writer
- Manuel Ugarte (footballer) (born 2001), Uruguayan footballer
- Manuel Ugarte (writer) (1875–1951), Argentine author
- Manuel Ugarte Soto (born 1940), Chilean police officer and lawyer
- Marcelino Ugarte (1855–1929), Argentine jurist and politician
- María Dolores Ugarte, Spanish statistician
- María Ugarte (1914–2011), Spanish-Dominican journalist and writer
- Nicolás Armentia Ugarte (1845–1909), Spanish missionary and bishop
- Óscar Ugarte (born 1944), Peruvian physician and politician
- Paula Ugarte (born 1987), Argentine footballer
- Pedro Ugarte (born 1963), Spanish writer and columnist
- Poly Ugarte (born 1959), Ecuadorian activist, lawyer, and politician
- Renzo Pi Hugarte (1934–2012), Uruguayan anthropologist
- Salvador de Iturbide y Huarte (1820–1856), prince of Mexico
- Sebastian Ugarte, Filipino footballer and sports executive
- Víctor Ugarte (1926–1995), Bolivian footballer
- Xóchitl Ugarte (born 1979), Mexican voice actress
- Zoila Ugarte de Landívar (1864–1969), Ecuadorian writer and suffragist

== Fictional characters ==
- Guillermo Ugarte, a character in the film Casablanca played by Peter Lorre.

== See also ==
- Alfonso Ugarte de Tacna, Peruvian football club
- Eguren Ugarte, a family-owned winery in the Basque Country, Spain
- Estadio Víctor Agustín Ugarte, a stadium in Potosí, Bolivia
- Huarte/Uharte, a town in Navarre, Spain
- Uharte-Arakil, a town in Navarre, Spain
