= Vintage Cellars (U.S.) =

Coordinates: 33°8′16.2″N 117°8′10.6″W

Vintage Cellars (U.S) is a wine storage design and retail company that specializes in custom wine cellars. The company was founded in 1990 by Gene Walder. Vintage Cellars, which is located in San Marcos, California, is also a retailer of wine storage cabinets, wine racks, and wine cooling systems. The company has designed and constructed wine cellars throughout the nation and is one of the longest-standing wine storage specialty businesses in the country. Though it began as a traditional brick and mortar business, the company now also does much of its business through its website.
