= Vinotemp =

Vinotemp International
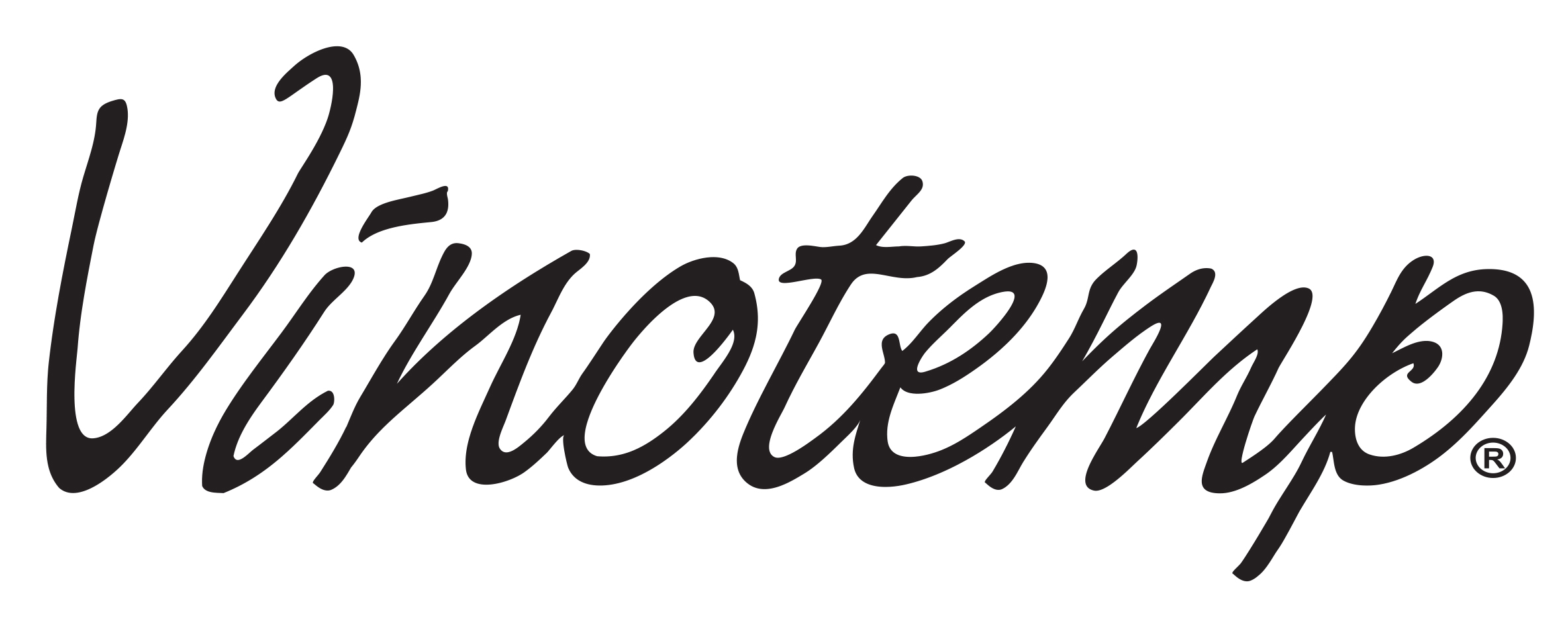

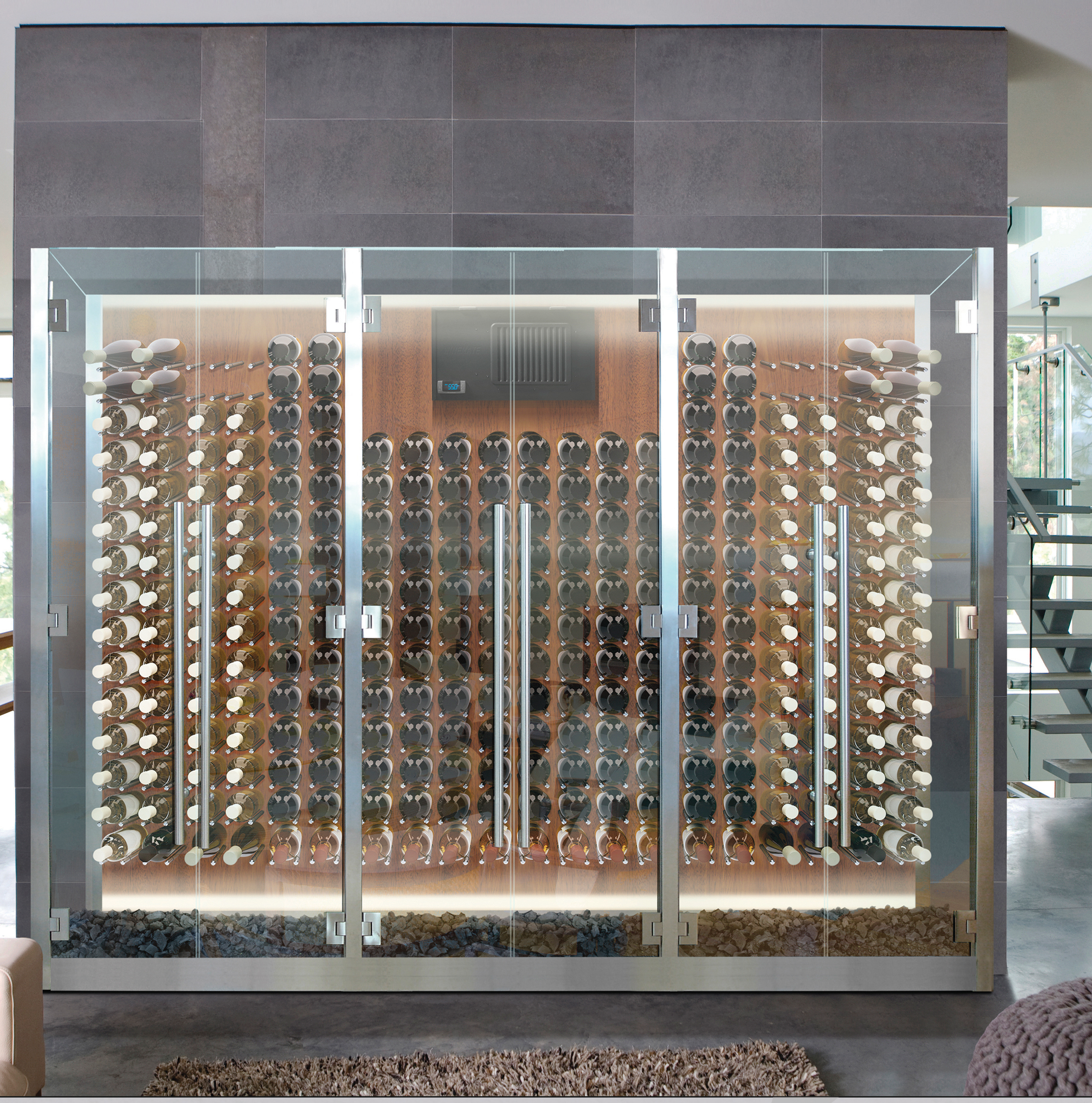
- A Vinotemp wine storage unit
- Trade name: Vinotemp
- Type: Private
- Industry: Manufacturing
- Founded: 1985
- Founder: Francis Ravel
- Headquarters: 732 S Racetrack Rd, Henderson, Nevada, United States
- Number of locations: 25 (2024)
- Areas served: Toronto; United States (contiguous)
- Key people: India Hynes (CEO)
- Products: Wine storage, cooling systems
- Brands: Apex; Brama; Cellartec; Element; Epicurianist; Sonoma Wine Hardware; Vinotemp; Wine-mate
- Number of employees: 100 (2017)
- Website: vinotemp.com

Vinotemp International is a manufacturer of wine storage units. It manufactures and distributes wine cabinets, racking, cooling systems, and wine cellars.

== History ==
Vinotemp was founded in 1985 in Los Angeles, California by Francis Ravel. Ravel initially produced and sold wine before transitioning into making wine cabinets. In 1993, Ravel created a self-contained wine cooling unit, which would come to be one of the companies most lucrative products.

In 2005 India Ravel-Hynes became CEO of Vinotemp. Hynes developed patents for the design and function of different wine storage products.

While the products were manufactured in Los Angeles, Vinotemp opened an office in Irvine, California, in 2011, to allow for an administrative expansion of accounting as well as design and marketing. In 2013, the company faced criticism after it was revealed that they included a clause in their Terms of Service penalizing customers for negative reviews. This clause no longer appears in the company's Terms of Service after such practices were outlawed under the Consumer Review Fairness Act of 2016.

In 2016, Vinotemp was ranked #44 in Orange County Business Journal's list of top women-owned businesses in Orange County. The company moved its headquarters to Henderson, Nevada in 2019.

Currently, Vinotemp manufacturers its wood cabinets in the U.S. and its metal coolers are made in Europe and China.

== Brands ==
Vinotemp currently owns the brands Epicureanist, Element, Wine-Mate, Cellartec, Apex (a high-end wine rack manufacturer that Vinotemp purchased in 2010), and Sonoma Wine Hardware.
