= Laguardia, Álava =

Laguardia
- Municipality
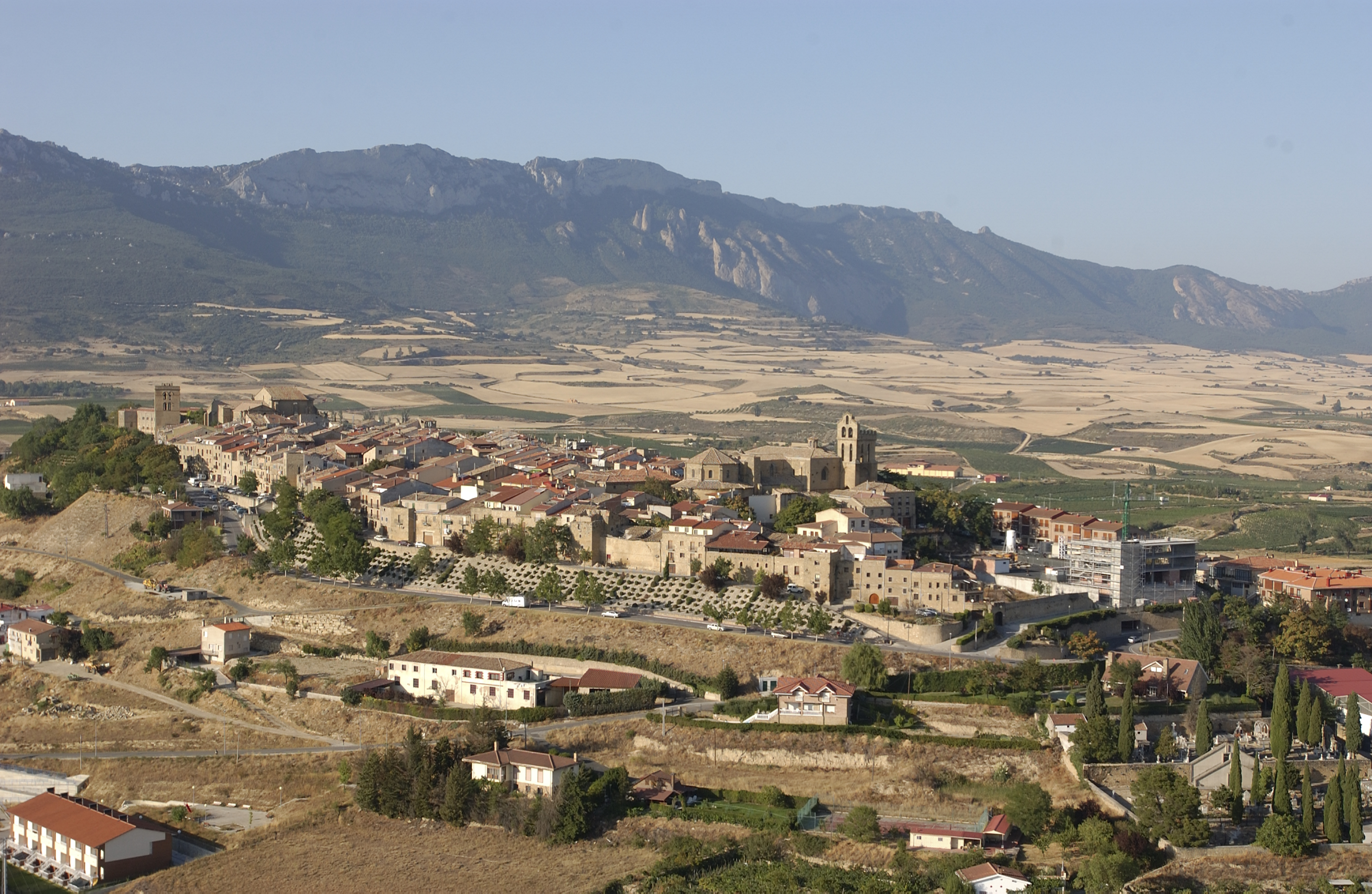
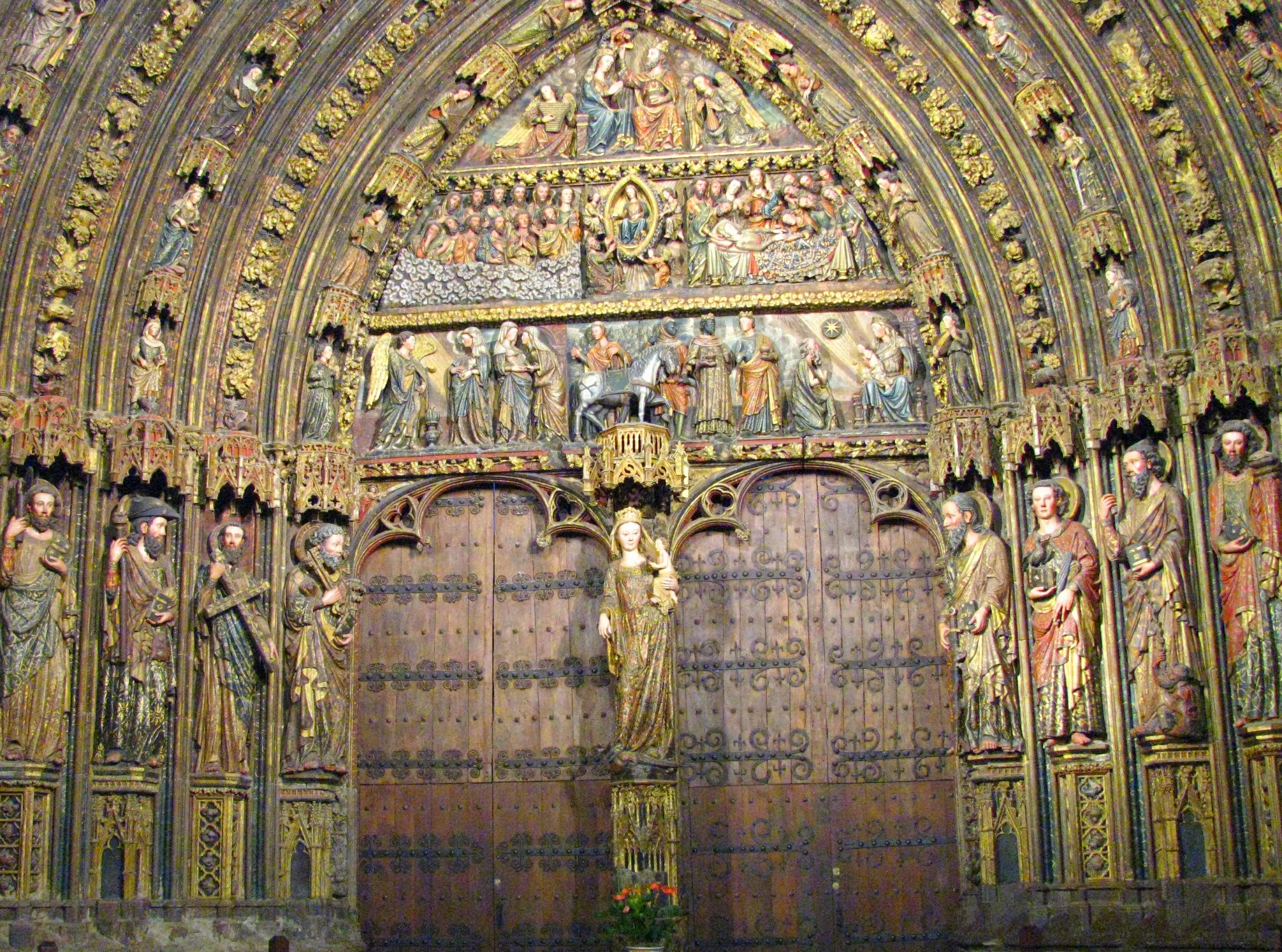
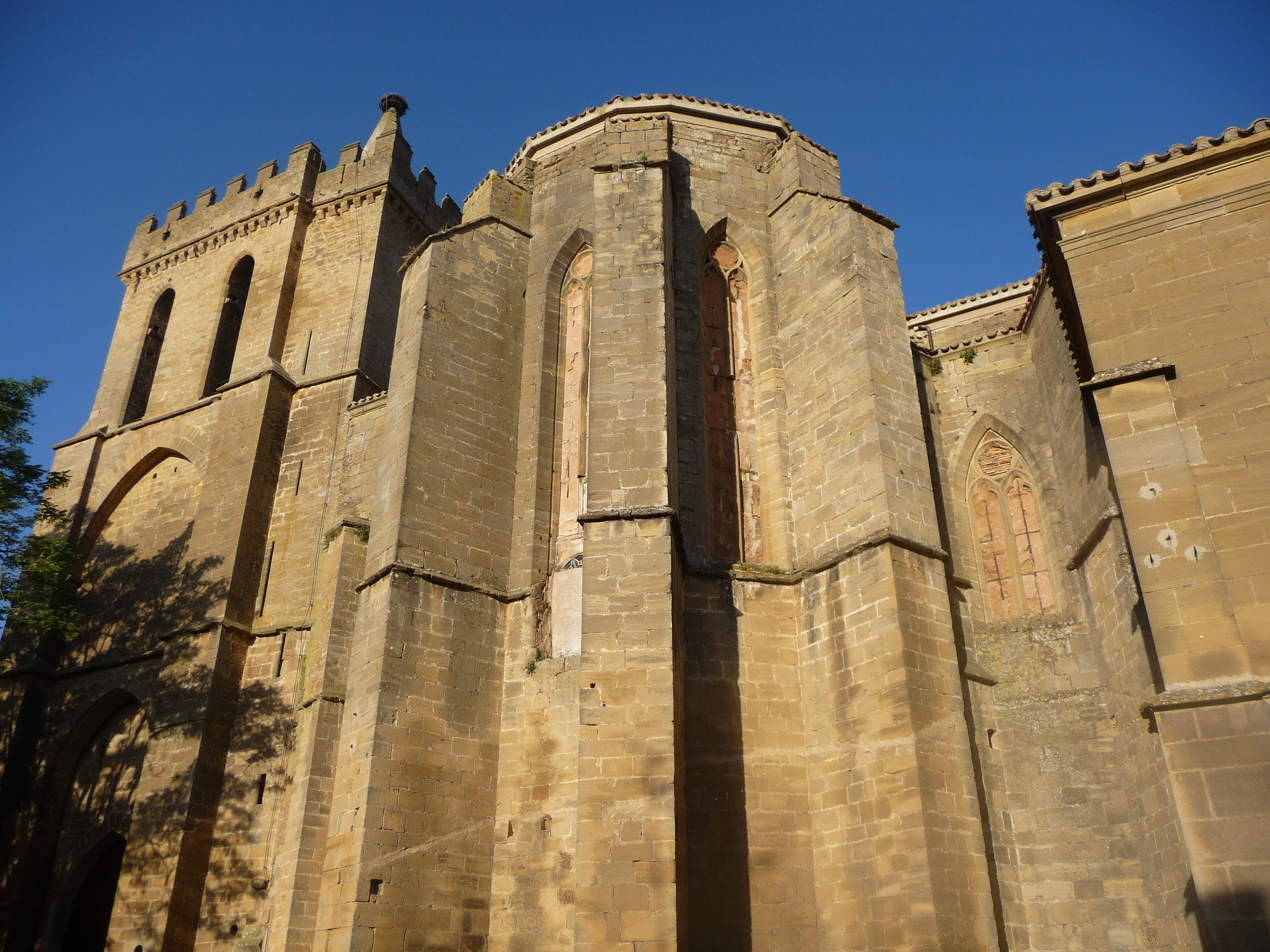
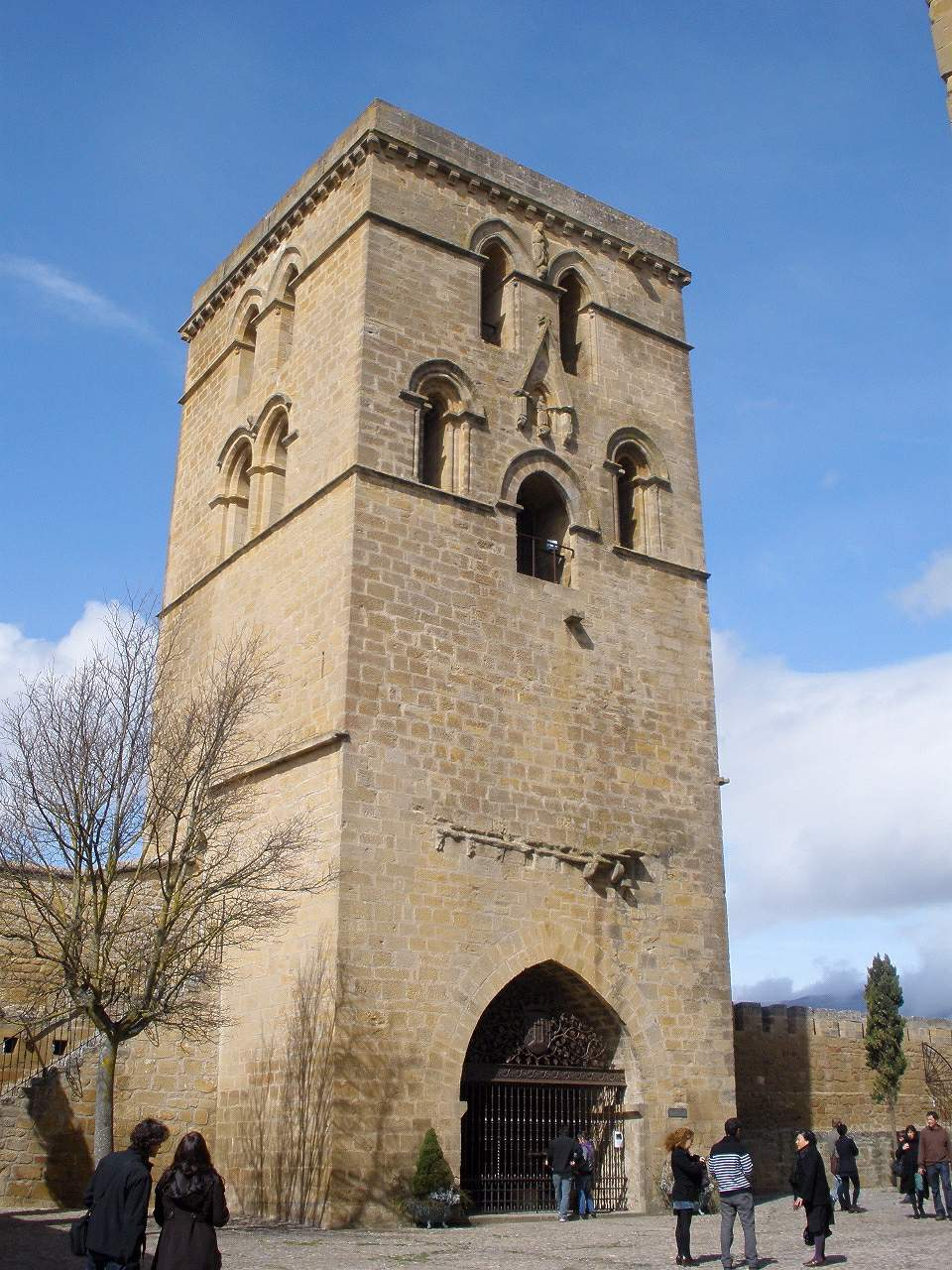
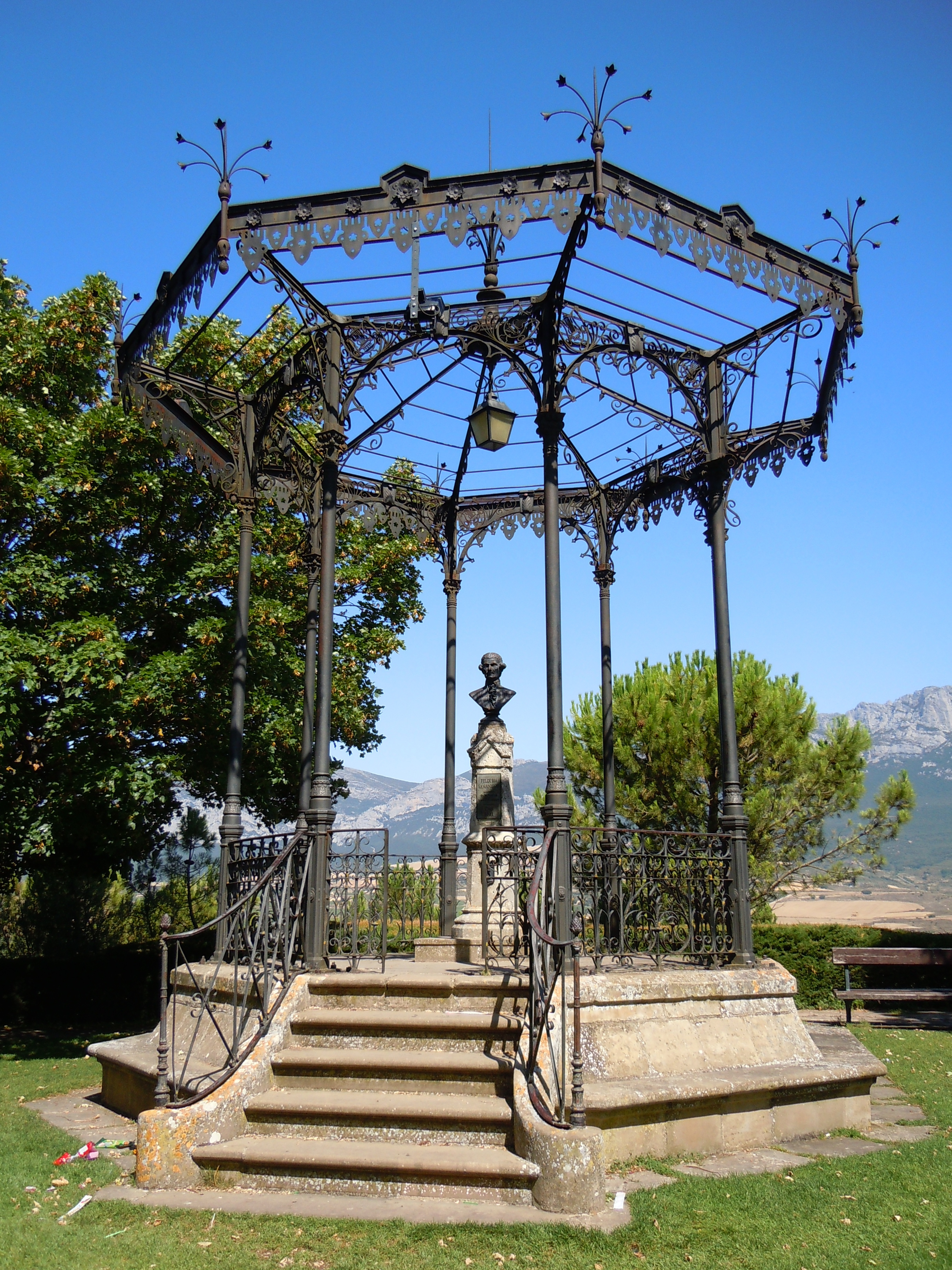
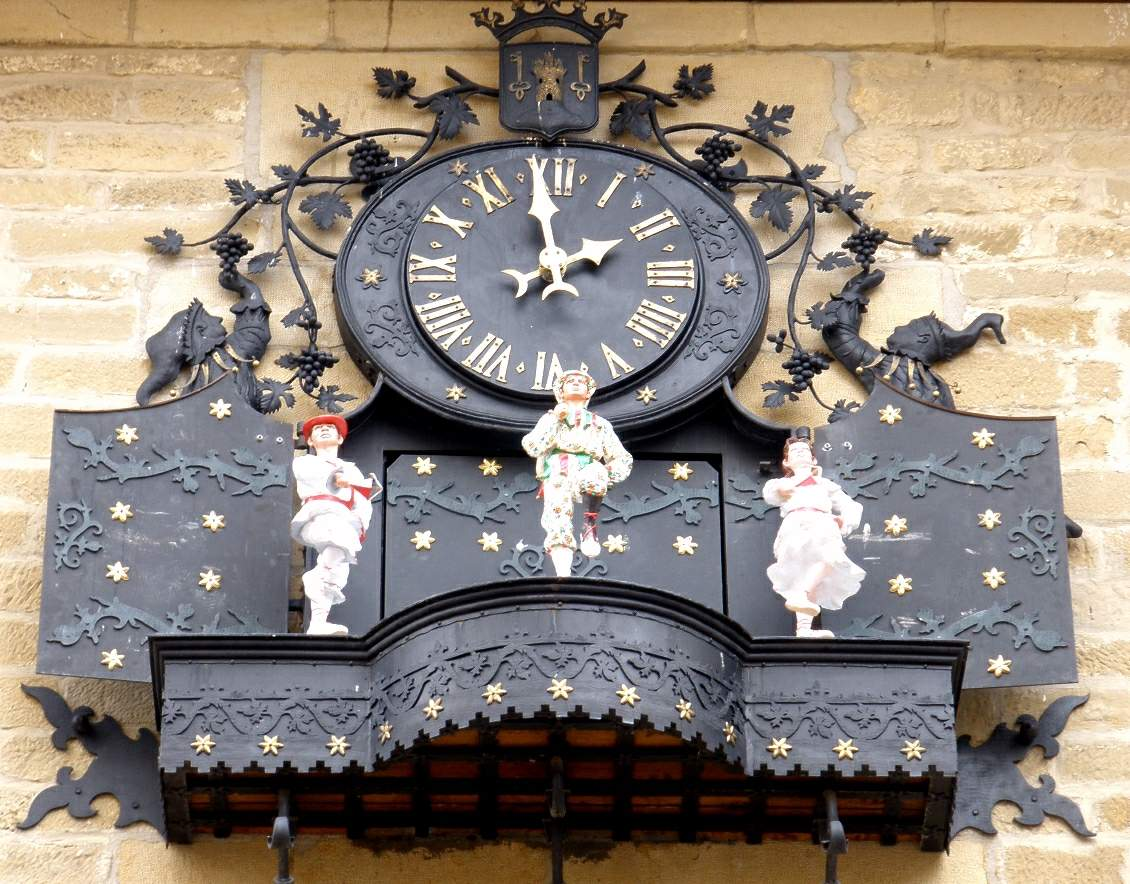
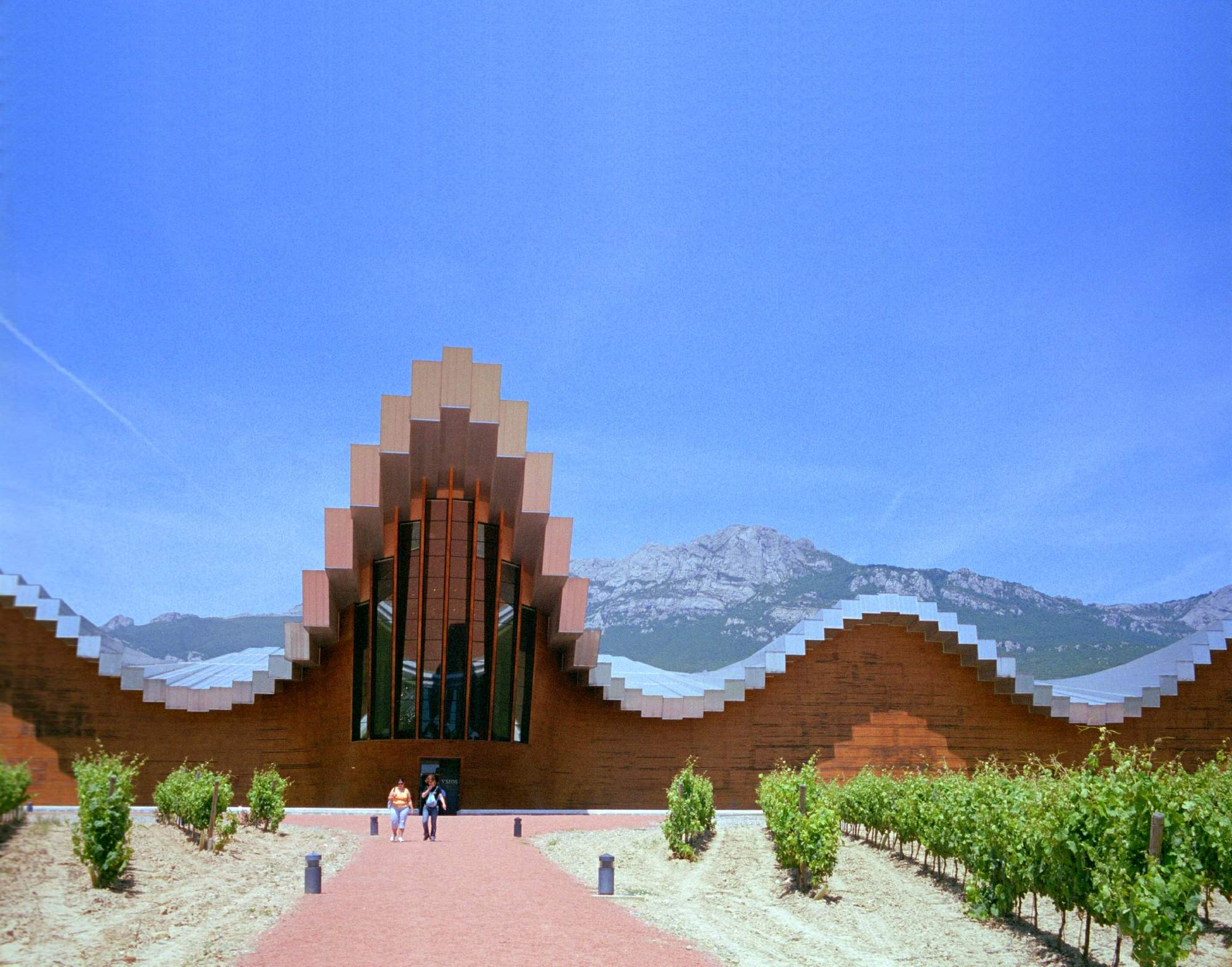

- Flag Coat of arms

- Location within Basque Country Laguardia (Spain)
- Coordinates: 42°33′12″N 2°35′6″W
- Country: Spain
- Autonomous community: Basque Country
- Province: Araba/Álava
- Eskualdea / Comarca: Rioja Alavesa
- Founded: 1164

Government
  - Mayor: José Manuel Amézaga (PP)

Area
  - Total: 8,108 km^{2} (3,131 sq mi)
- Elevation: 630 m (2,070 ft)

Population (2025-01-01)
  - Total: 1,459
  - Density: 0.1799/km^{2} (0.4661/sq mi)
- Time zone: UTC+1 (CET)
  - Summer (DST): UTC+2 (CEST)
- Postal code: 01300 / 01308 / 01309 / 01321
- Website: Official website

Laguardia (Basque: Guardia) is a town and municipality in the province of Álava, in the Basque Country of northern Spain. Specifically, Laguardia falls within the administrative region of Rioja Alavesa. It had a population of 1,500 as of mid-2018.

The town lies on a hill and is surrounded by a wall that King Sancho the Strong ordered built. Five old gates to the city are still preserved: Mercadal, Carnicerías (Butchers), Páganos, San Juan and Santa Engracia. Additionally, the streets and surroundings of Laguardia still keep a medieval atmosphere that give the town an ancient touch.

Regarding the economy, its main strength is the wine industry, locally grown grapes being processed in numerous wineries.

== Toponym ==
During the Middle Ages, it appeared with names such as Leguarda, Giardia, Guard, Guoardia, Lagarde, and Laguoardia until the current name was finally fixed. The full and complete name with which the town is known currently is La Guardia de Navarra Sonsierra.

There has been some controversy about the Basque name of the town. In the late nineteenth century, the belief that before being granted the "letter of villazgo" in 1164, the population of Laguardia was called Biasteri had spread. Many people saw "Biasteri" as a name of Basque origin and folk etymologies such as "bi haitz herri" became popular. As a consequence, the term Biasteri was used as the Basque name of the town until recently.

Nevertheless, in the late twentieth century, philologists and historians reached the conclusion that Biasteri was the ancient name given to the nearby town of Viñaspre, not of Laguardia. Therefore, the association made until that date was not correct, and the Basque Language Academy, Euskaltzaindia, ruled that the Basque standard name of the town is Guardia.

== Neighborhoods ==
Laguardia has three separate neighborhoods:

- The Campillar is 7.5 km from the city center, near the Ebro River and it has 28 inhabitants.
- Laserna is 11 km from the city center and it is separated from the rest of the municipality by a meander of the river Ebro. It has 43 inhabitants.
- Páganos is 3.5 km away and it has 87 inhabitants.

== History ==
Laguardia has a rich historical past. At a place called La Hoya, there is an important archaeological site. It is a pre-Roman settlement of Celtiberian of Berona ethnic and it covers an extensive period of more than a thousand years or so since the twelfth century BC to the second century BC.

Additionally, the town received certain privileges regarding jurisdiction during the reign of the king of Navarre Sancho VI "El Sabio" in 1164. The initial demarcation covered areas from "Las Conchas de Haro" to "Soto Inigo Galindez", in the current term of Viana. It was the beginning of the community of "Villa y Tierra". Eventually, new villas were created in the surroundings changing the focus of attention to other territories such as San Vicente, Labraza and Viana. In any case, it was the main square of the Sonsierra of Navarra during most part of the medieval period.

== Economy ==
The core of the economy in Laguardia is the wine industry). Laguardia is the capital of one of the most famous wine regions of Spain, Rioja Alavesa. In Laguardia and its surroundings a wine known as the Denominación de Origen Calificada Rioja is produced.

== Monuments and sights ==
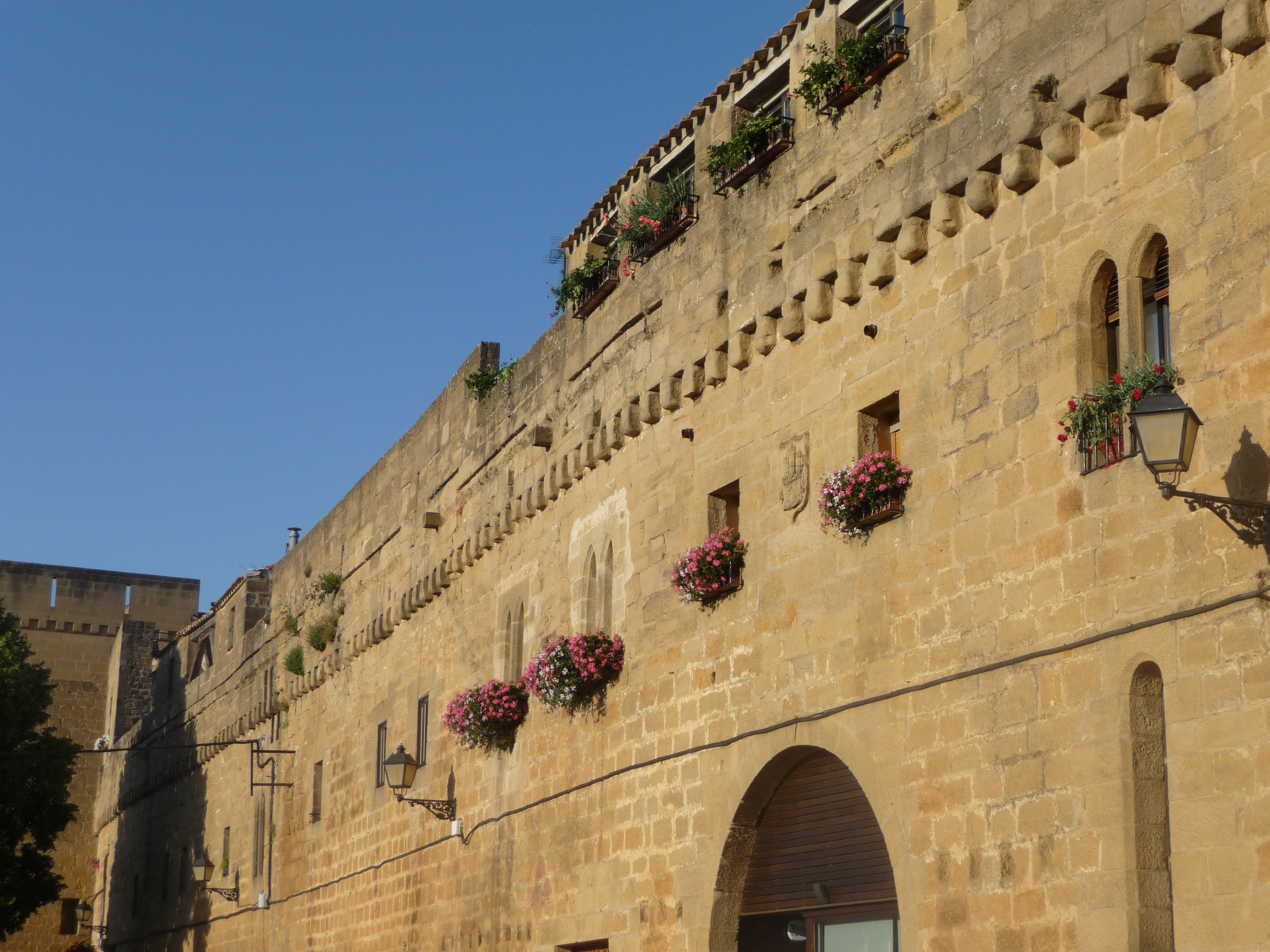
Laguardia ramparts

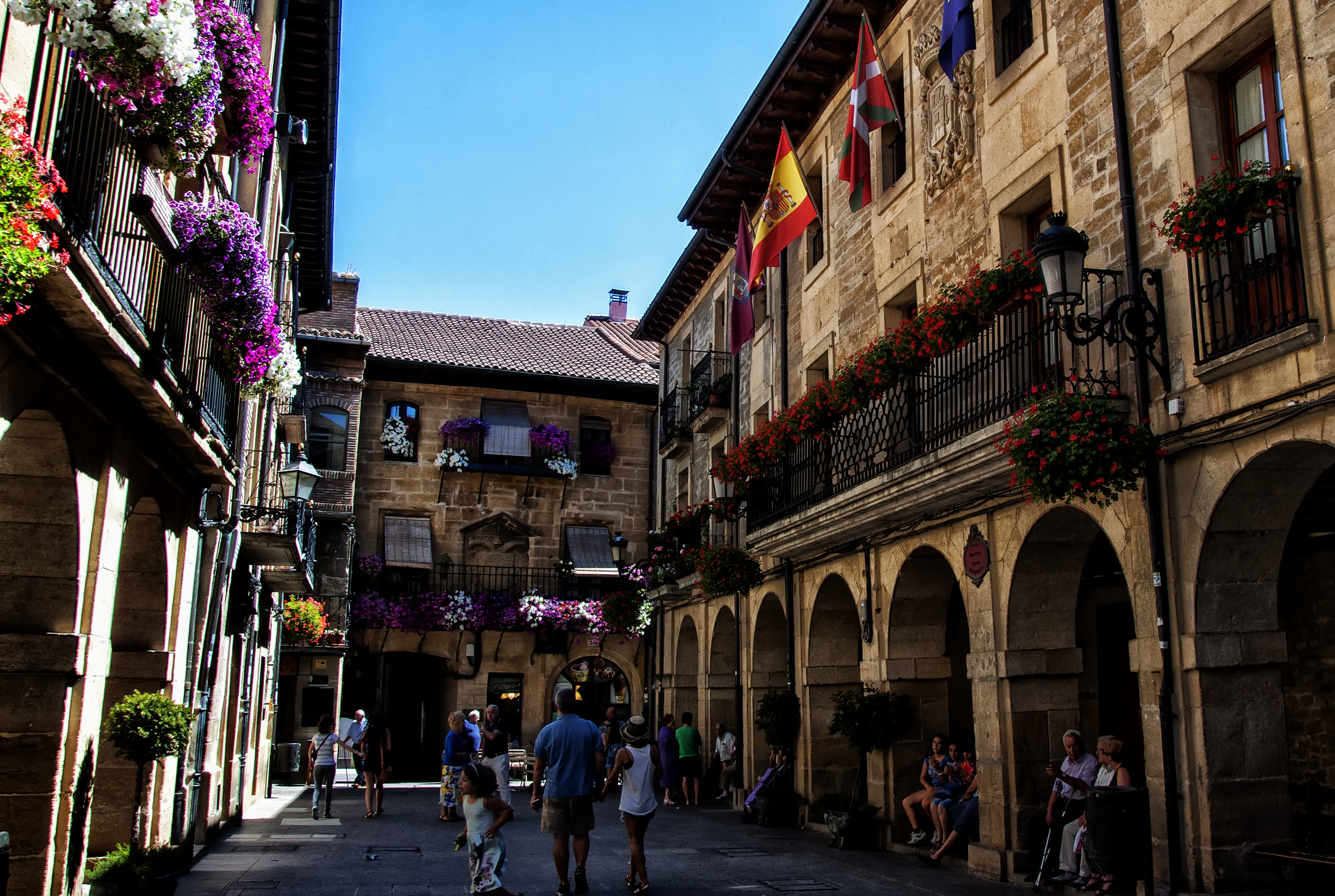
Town hall

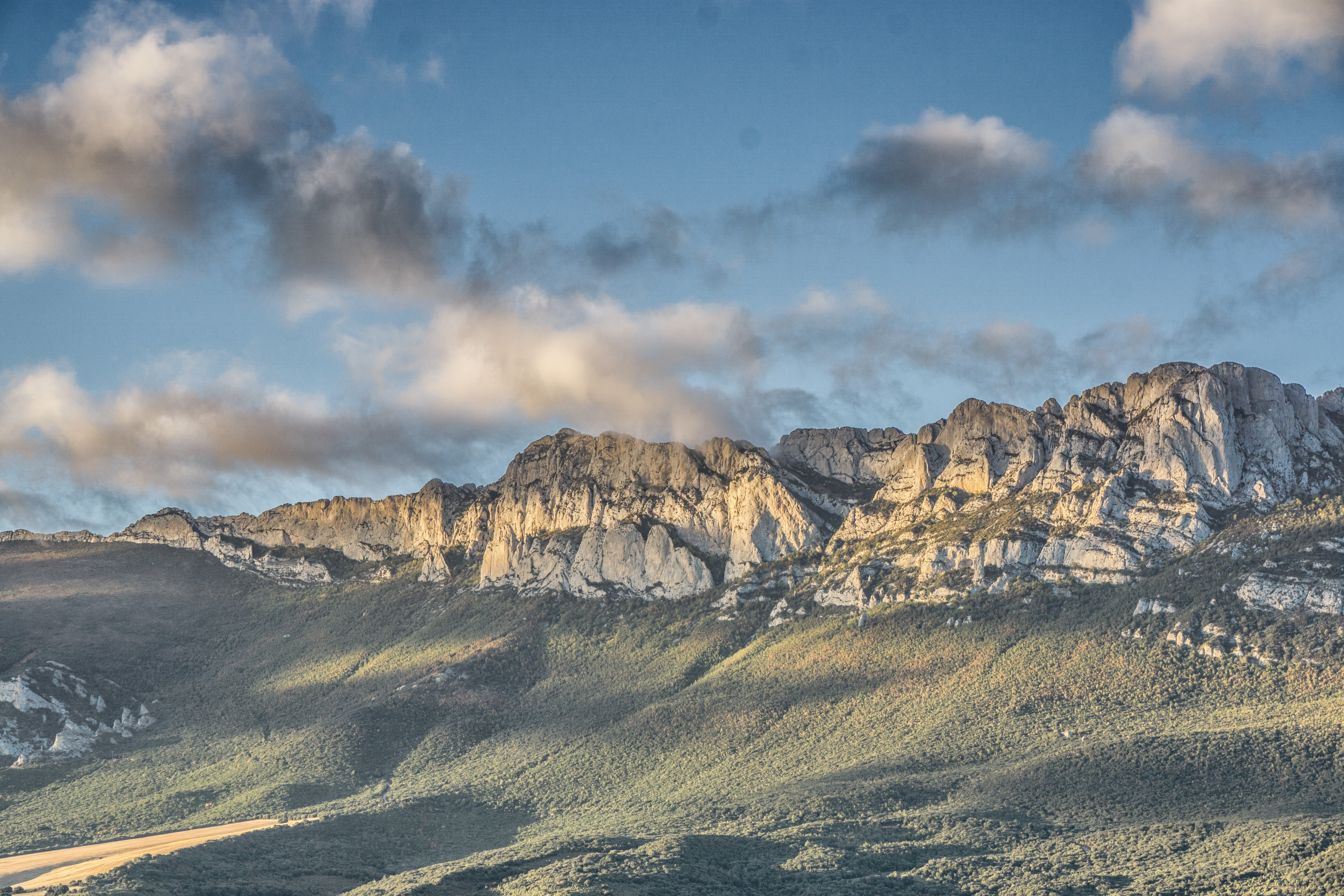
Sierra de Cantabria mountains north of Laguardia

- The Wall: the high walls surrounding the town are about two meters in depth, made of stone. It has five doors that lead to the villa.
- The Church of Santa Maria de los Reyes, which in the past was probably a Templar monastery. Next to it, there is a tower called the Tower of Santa Maria or Torre abbey (it is believed that the abbot lived there). The tower has a remarkable Gothic façade with a portico that is conserved almost intact, indeed, the carving was finished in the fourteenth century and it was polychromed in the seventeenth. It is one of the few preserved polychrome portals in Spain (in Toro (Zamora) there is another one). The sizes of the archivolts represent the Apostles and the porch tells the story of the Holy Virgin.
- The Church of San Juan, which initially was built in Romanesque style and finally completed in the Gothic style. It has an attached chapel of the eighteenth century, dedicated to the Virgin of Pilar. Its bell tower belonged originally to a castle.
- The Hermitage of Santa María de Berberana. It is Romanesque and the only church in the whole Rioja Alavesa which possesses a square apse.
- Plaza Mayor: It is in the center of the town. Tourists can find there both the new and the old townhall. The latter shows on its facade the shield of the villa and a chiming clock with automata that at 12, 14, 17 and 20 hours dance to the rhythm of a typical parade of the celebrations of the town.
- Renaissance Old Town Hall: It has an imperial shield of Charles V.
- The Capuchin convent.
- Prehistoric remains of some dolmens and a Celtic village in the town of La Hoya. Furthermore, there is also a Celtic pond.
- The Birthplace of the fabulist Félix María de Samaniego. It is a seventeenth-century palace that houses the tourist office.
- Eguren Ugarte, vineyard and wine caves with hotel and tasting tours
- Bodega El Fabulista, wine caves with hotel and tasting tours

== Notable people ==
- Blanche of Navarre (1133–1156), Queen of Castile.
- Felix Maria Samaniego (1745–1801), a writer of fables. His birthplace is a house of the seventeenth century, which is still preserved and dedicated to wine museum.
- Óscar de Marcos (born 1989), professional footballer (Athletic Bilbao).

== Music ==
Music has long been part of cultural life in Laguardia. Bagpipers are an important part of the town's musical heritage. Several generations of bagpipers have contributed to the development to the Day of the Piper, one of the most important festivals, held in honor of pipers who reside in Laguardia and the surrounding area. The town also has its own municipal band, which has been active for 130 years. Also, several rock groups, such as: "Tubo Skape" or "Allá Cuidaos" form part of the town's musical history.

== Sports ==
The town has a football team of Regional Division. An earlier formation competed in the Regional League of La Rioja. In 1967, the sixteenth stage of the cycling Tour of Spain started in Laguardia, a time trial finishing in Vitoria. The winner was the Frenchman Raymond Poulidor.
