= Eguren Ugarte =

Spanish vineyard

Eguren Ugarte is a 140-year-old landmark family-owned winery in the Rioja Alavesa territory of the Basque Country, northern Spain. Founded in 1870 by Anastasio Eguren, it is known as one of the longest-standing vineyards in Europe.

The winery in the preserved medieval walled village of Laguardia has approximately two thousand metres of wine cellar caves and an average of thirty different varieties of wine, and is a regular participant in the annual vendimia "first harvesting" festivals of its region.

Eguren Ugarte has won several awards for its hotel accommodations and wine tours, and recently entered into a partnership deal with Delta Air Lines to supply wine in-flight.

Eguren Ugarte is also a sponsor of the Santa Catalina Film Festival in Southern California and frequently supports other various independent art galleries and entertainment events internationally.

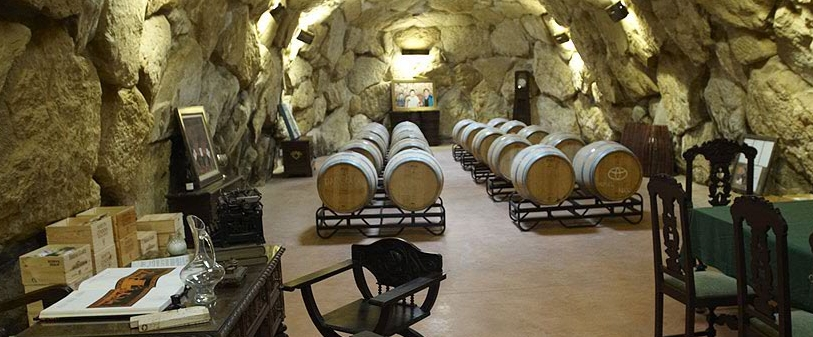
Cellar Caves

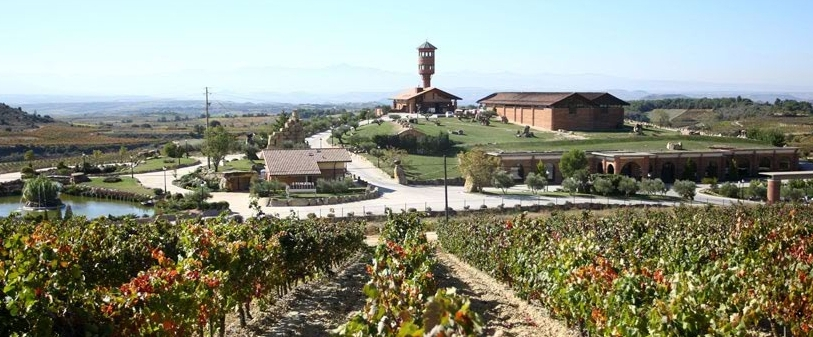
Panorama

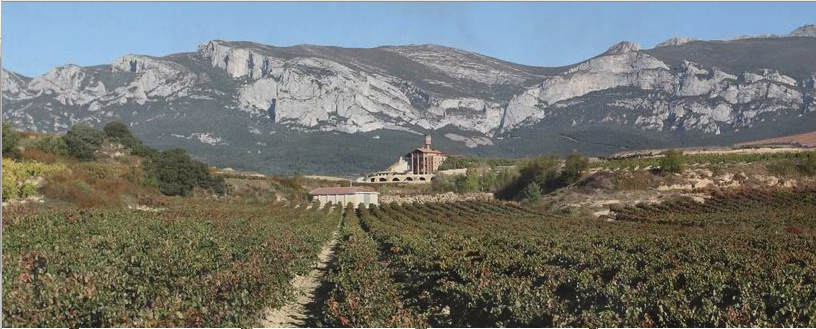
The Eguren Ugarte Vineyard.
