= Church of Santa María de los Reyes =

Church in Laguardia, Spain

- Iglesia de Santa María de los Reyes (Spanish); Erregeen Andre Mariaren eliza (Basque)
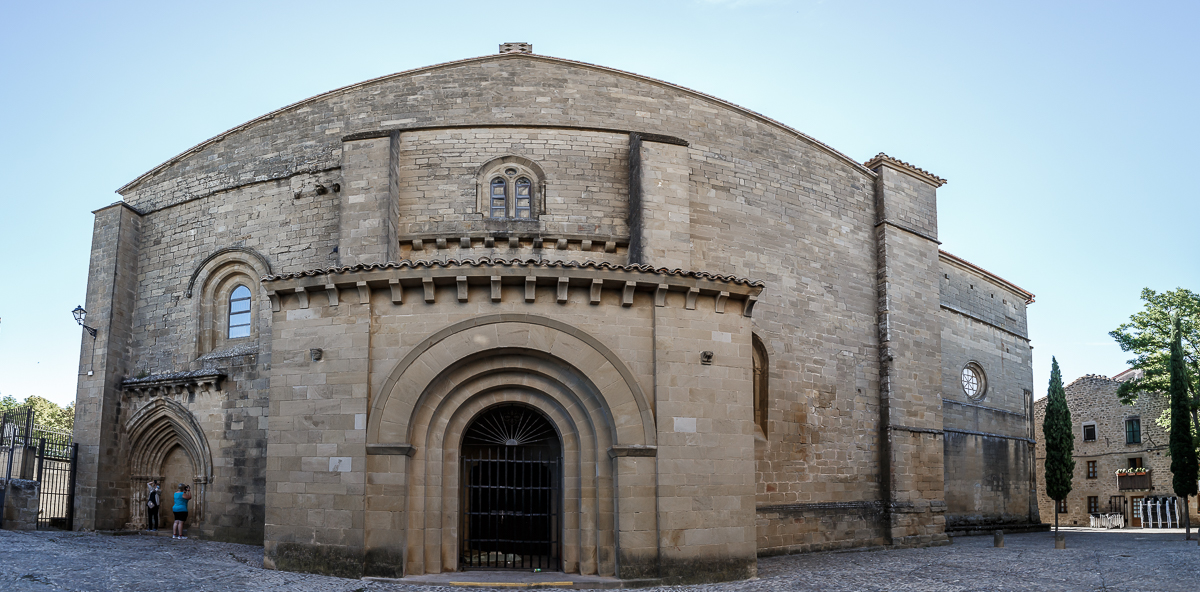
- Panoramic view of the church
- 42°33′19″N 2°35′08″W
- Location: Laguardia, Álava, Basque Country
- Country: Spain
- Denomination: Catholic Church
- Tradition: Latin Church

History
- Status: Parish church

Administration
- Archdiocese: Archidiocese of Burgos
- Diocese: Diocese of Vitoria

Spanish Cultural Heritage
- Official name: Iglesia de Santa María de los Reyes
- Type: Non-movable
- Criteria: Monument
- Designated: 3 June 1931
- Reference no.: RI-51-0000362

The Church of Santa María de los Reyes (Spanish: Iglesia de Santa María de los Reyes, Basque: Erregeen Andre Mariaren eliza) is a church located in Laguardia, Basque Country, Spain. It was declared Bien de Interés Cultural in 1931.
