= Félix María de Samaniego =

Spanish writer (1745–1801)

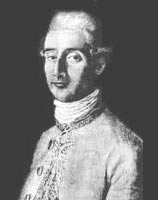
- Born: Félix María Serafín Sánchez de Samaniego y Zabala; 12 October 1745; Laguardia, Álava, Spain
- Died: 11 August 1801 (aged 55); Laguardia, Álava, Spain
- Notable work: Fábulas (1781–1784)

Félix María Serafín Sánchez de Samaniego y Zabala (12 October 1745 – 11 August 1801) was a Spanish neoclassical fabulist.

== Life ==
He was born and died in Laguardia, Álava, in the Basque Country, and was educated at Valladolid. A government appointment was secured for him by his uncle the Count de Peñaflorida.

His Fábulas (1781–1784), one hundred and fifty-seven in number, were originally written for the boys educated in the school founded by the Biscayan Society. In the first instalment of his fables he admitted that he had taken Tomás Iriarte for his model, a statement which proves that he had read Iriarte's fables in manuscript; he appears, however, to have resented their publication in 1782, and this led to a rancorous controversy between the former friends. Samaniego, however, was highly original in the matters of quiet humour and careless grace, and his popularity kept on growing.
