= Storage of wine =

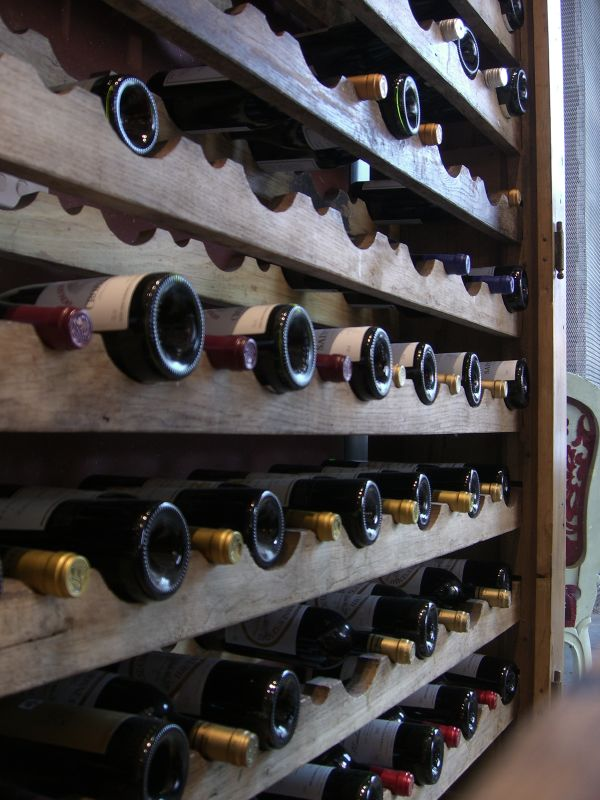
Wines stored in a rack

Storage of wine is an important consideration for wine that is being kept for long-term aging. While most wine is consumed within 24 hours of purchase, fine wines are often set aside for long-term storage. Wine is one of the few commercial product that can improve in flavour and value with age, but it can also rapidly deteriorate if kept in inadequate conditions.

The three factors that have the most direct impact on a wine's condition are light, humidity, and temperature. Historically, the storage of wine was handled by wine merchants. Since the mid-20th century, however, consumers have been increasingly storing their own wine in home-based wine cellars.

== Conditions affecting wine ==
The three factors that have the most pronounced effect on wine in storage are light, humidity, and temperature.

=== Light ===
Direct sunlight or incandescent light can adversely react with phenolic compounds in wine and create "wine faults". When wine is exposed to the light from sunlight, fluorescent artificial lights or any other form of lighting, it can change its flavor and aroma.

Light-bodied white wines run the greatest risk from light exposure, and for that reason, they are often packaged in tinted wine bottles that offer some protection from light. Wines packaged in clear, light green and blue colored bottles are the most vulnerable to light and may need extra precautions for storage. In the cellar, wines are stored in corrugated boxes or wooden crates to protect them from direct light.

=== Humidity ===
Some degree of humidity is required in order to keep wines with cork enclosures from drying out. Even when wine bottles are stored on their sides, one side of the cork is still exposed to air. Should the cork begin to dry out, it can allow oxygen to enter the bottle, filling the ullage space and possibly causing the wine to spoil or oxidize. Excessive humidity can also pose the risk of damaging wine labels, which may hinder identification or hurt potential resale value. Wine experts such as Jancis Robinson note that 75% humidity is often cited as ideal but also that there is very little significant research to definitively establish an optimal range. Concern about humidity is one of the primary reasons why wine experts such as Tom Stevenson recommend that wine should not be kept in a refrigerator since the refrigeration process often includes dehumidifying, which can quickly dry out corks.

Some wine experts debate the importance of humidity for proper wine storage. In the Wine Spectator, writer Matt Kramer cites a French study which claimed that the relative humidity within a bottle is maintained at 100% regardless of the closure used or the orientation of the bottle. However, Alexis Lichine contends that low humidity can still be detrimental to premium wine quality due to the risk of the cork drying out. As a way of maintaining optimal humidity, Lichine recommends spreading half an inch of gravel on the floor of a wine cellar and periodically sprinkling it with some water.

=== Temperature ===
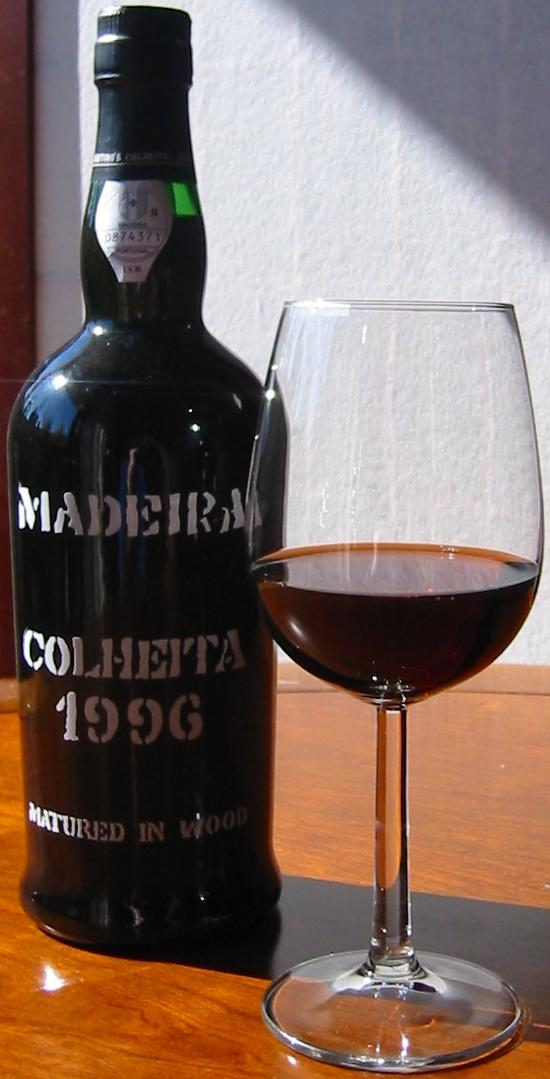
Madeira is exposed to high temperatures during its winemaking process and is thereby able to sustain exposure to higher temperatures more easily than other wines.

Wine is very susceptible to changes in temperature, with temperature control being an important consideration in wine storage. If the wine is exposed to too high a temperature (in excess of 77 °F (25 °C)) for long periods of time, it may be spoiled or become "corked" and develop off-flavors that taste raisiny or stewed. The exact length of time that a wine is at risk of exposure to high temperatures will vary depending on the wine, with some wines (such as Madeira which is exposed to high temperatures during its winemaking) being able to sustain exposure to high temperatures more easily than other, more delicate wines (such as Riesling). If the wine is exposed to temperatures that are too cold, the wine can freeze and expand, causing the cork to be pushed out or (more usually) the bottle to crack; this will allow more oxygen to be exposed to the wine. Temperature swings (such as repeated transferring a wine from a warm room to a cool refrigerator) can also cause adverse chemical reactions in the wine that may lead to a variety of wine faults.

In general, a wine has a greater potential to develop complexity and a more aromatic bouquet if it is allowed to age slowly in a relatively cool environment. The lower the temperature, the more slowly a wine develops. On average, the rate of chemical reactions in wine doubles with each 18 °F (10 °C) increase in temperature. Most experts, such as Jancis Robinson, recommend that wine be kept at constant temperatures between 50 and 59 °F (10 and 15 °C). Tom Stevenson speculates that 52 °F (11 °C) may be the most ideal temperature for storage and aging, while Karen MacNeil recommends keeping wine intended for ageing in a cool area with a constant temperature around 55 °F (13 °C). Wine can be stored at temperatures as high as 69 °F (21 °C) without long-term negative effect. Professor Cornelius Ough of the University of California, Davis believes that wine can be exposed to temperatures as high as 120 °F (49 °C) for a few hours and not be damaged.

=== Vibration ===
Although anecdotal information regarding the contributions of vibration in wine storage states that it contributes to the accelerated ageing of wine with adverse effects, this remains a research area with relatively little data. In a particular study, vibrations of different frequencies have been shown to have their own distinct effect on the chemistry of the wine. The study concludes, "Vibration could be used to accelerate the ageing of wine, but in most cases, this may lead to negative effects on wine quality. Therefore, to store red wines with limited changes in physicochemical properties, vibrations should be minimized."

== Orientation of the bottle ==
Most wine racks are designed to allow a wine to be stored on its side. The thinking behind this orientation is that the cork is more likely to stay moist and not dry out if it is kept in constant contact with the wine. Some wineries package their wines upside down in the box for much the same reason.

Research in the late 1990s suggested that the ideal orientation for wine bottles is at a slight angle, rather than completely horizontal. This allows the cork to maintain partial contact with the wine in order to stay damp but also keeps the air bubble formed by a wine's ullage at the top rather than in the middle of the bottle if the wine is lying on its side. Keeping the ullage near the top, it has been argued, allows for a slower and more gradual oxidation and maturation process. This is because the pressure of the air bubble that is the ullage space rises and falls depending on temperature fluctuation. When exposed to higher temperatures the bubble's pressure increases (becomes positive relative to the air outside of the bottle), and if the wine is tilted at an angle, this compressed gas will diffuse through the cork and not harm the wine. When the temperature falls the process reverses.

If the wine is completely on its side then this action will eject some wine through the cork. Through this "breathing" which can result from variations in temperature, oxygen may be repeatedly introduced into the bottle and as a result, can react with the wine. An appropriate and constant temperature is therefore preferred. Additionally, oxidation will occur more rapidly at higher temperatures and gases dissolve into liquids faster the lower the temperature.

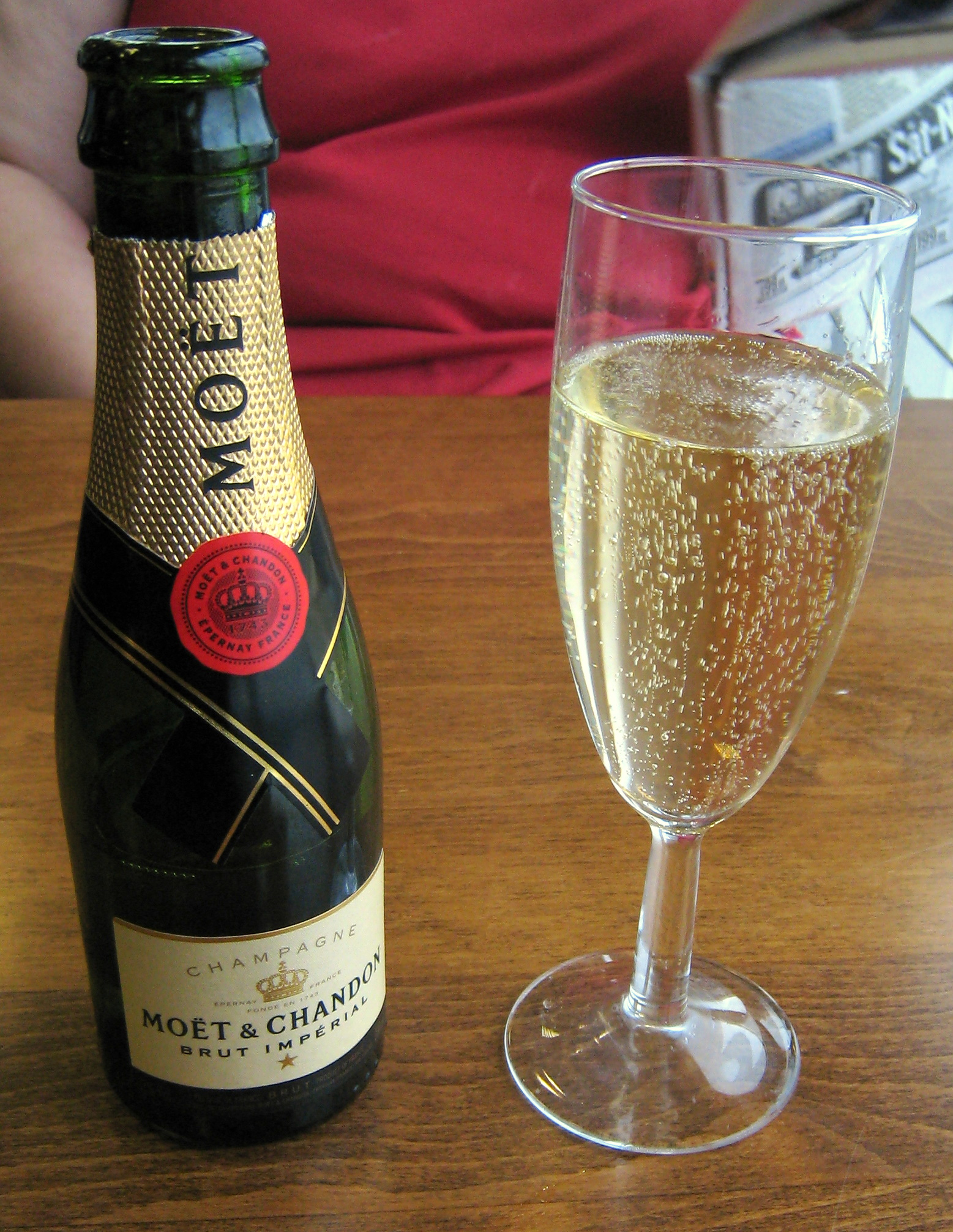
Champagne is often recommended to be stored upright rather than lying on its side.

While most wines can benefit from lying on their side, Champagne and other sparkling wines tend to age better if they are kept upright. This is because the internal pressure caused by the trapped carbonic gas provides enough humidity and protection from oxygen. Caterer Magazine claims that the preference for upright storage of Champagne is shared by the Comité Interprofessionnel du Vin de Champagne (CIVC) who conducted an extensive study of Champagnes that were stored in various conditions and orientations. This study found that Champagne stored on its side aged more quickly because oxygen was allowed to seep in after the Champagne corks lost their elasticity due to contact with the wine. However, the CIVC still recommends storing Champagne on its side, stating that:

Champagne is ready for drinking upon release, matured to perfection in the producer’s cellars. It will, however, keep well for several years if stored on its side in a cool, dark, draft-free place, following the three golden rules of Champagne storage:

- Constant, low ambient temperature (around 10 °C/50 °F)
- Generous humidity
- No direct exposure to sunlight, noise or excessive vibration

== Alternative wine closures ==
Storing wine that is bottled with alternative wine closures other than cork has many of the same considerations in regards to temperature and light sensitivity. While humidity and concerns about oxidation are not as pronounced, the relatively recent popularity and increased usage of these closures have not given many opportunities for research into the storage and ageing potential of wines that use these closures.

== Places to store wine ==
Since the end of the 20th century, there has been growth in industries relating to wine storage. Some wine connoisseurs may elect to store their wine at home in a dedicated room, closet or cellarette. Other options involve purchases and rentals at off-site wine storage facilities that are specifically designed for the task.

Wine will prematurely develop if stored in an environment that has large temperature variations, particularly if these occur frequently. Temperature control systems ensure the wine cellar temperature is very stable. The variations cause corks to expand and contract which leads to oxidation of the wine.

If wine is stored in conditions that are too dry, the cork will shrink and cause leakage. Too moist, and mould and contamination may occur. Climate Controlled Wine Storage maintains moderate humidity levels (55%–75%) to avoid these problems and assist in the optimum wine development conditions.

Some industries focus on the construction of home wine cellars and wine caves, small rooms or spaces in which to store wine. Others produce smaller wine accessories, such as racks and wine refrigerators. These appliances can feature adjustable temperature interfaces, two chambers for red and white wines and materials which protect the wine from the sun and ambient environment.

Wine preservation and dispensing systems have also been developed that store wine at their optimal temperatures and use nitrogen gas to dispense the wine. Nitrogen gas helps prevent wine from oxidation and premature spoilage.

== See also ==
- Blue Grotto, former underground wine storage vaults in the anchorages of the Brooklyn Bridge, on the Manhattan side
- Speyer wine bottle
- Top-shelf and Well drinks, the system of liquor storage used in bars
