= Julio Ugarte y Ugarte =

Peruvian-born founder of the Society of Transcendental Philosophy in Brazil

Julio Ugarte y Ugarte (1890 – 17 August 1949) was a Peruvian writer and founder of the Society of Transcendental Philosophy in Brazil.

== Personal life ==
Julio Ugarte y Ugarte was born in Lima, the son of Luis Ugarte and Fidelia Rosa Ugarte.

== Career ==
On 17 August 1937, Julio Ugarte y Ugarte established the Society of Transcendental Philosophy (School of Christian Initiation) in Brazil.

In 1939, he wrote The Two Great Spiritual Laws. He also organized the settling of the Guarita in the State of Rio Grande do Sul, Brazil. This event was widely covered in the periodical Correio do Povo.

He died in Brazil in 1949.
