= Matt Kramer (wine writer) =

American wine critic since 1976

Matt Kramer is an American wine critic since 1976. He is a columnist for The Oregonian, was a columnist for The New York Sun before its demise in 2008, and previously for Los Angeles Times, and since 1985 is a regular contributor to Wine Spectator. He has been described as "perhaps the most un-American of all America's wine writers", by Mike Steinberger as "one of the more insightful and entertaining wine writers around", and by Hugh Johnson as "an intellectual guerrilla among wine writers".

Among his publications are the books Making Sense of Wine (1989), Making Sense of Burgundy (1990), Making Sense of California Wine, (1992), Making Sense of Italian Wine (2006) and Matt Kramer on Wine.

== Career ==
Kramer describes in Making Sense of Wine how he began his career as a wine writer in 1976, then a food writer of a weekly paper, in a meeting with his publisher. As the advertising department had altered the food page contents to include a "wine of the week" column, to the advertisers' approval, Kramer was told that he would write this new column. Kramer resisted, saying, "But I don't know anything about wine", but the publisher replied, "That's all right. Neither does anyone else".

== Contentions ==
Considered an advocate of the concept of terroir, Kramer is credited with defining the term as a wine’s "somewhereness", a frequently quoted definition.

Kramer has, like Allen Meadows, expressed concern on what they consider over-reliance among California Pinot noir growers on using limited variation series of Burgundy clones from Dijon in their practice, citing this as one reason that so many California pinot noirs have similar taste and lack complexity, and have urged growers to aim for a more varied mix of clones.

On the debate on wine cellar humidity, Kramer states in Making Sense of Wine, "the precept that a home cellar should be humid is a relic of the past" due to the inherent humidity within the bottles themselves, and are "impervious to moisture or humidity-laden air", concluding, "humidity in the home cellar is an irrelevancy".

Kramer was the target of criticism by Australian wine writer James Halliday who stated Kramer was "even more misguided than Robert Parker". Halliday spoke in reaction to what he perceived to be "Kramer's suggestions of big company taste fixing", which he called "farcical".

Reacting to a statement by Jancis Robinson who reported the result of a PROP test that suggested she might be a supertaster, and a following admission by Robert Parker that he does not care for mildly spicy or seasoned food, lead Kramer to criticize wine critics in his New York Sun column, pointing to "almost desperate attempt by some of today's wine tasting potentates to bolster their credibility by suggesting a physical superiority". Kramer summarized that, "suggesting a linkage of taste buds to wine judgment is like confusing eyesight with insight". Robinson later addressed the issue in an article that suggested Kramer may not have read Robinson's own account before publishing his column, stressing that to suggest physical superiority "was the last thing [she] was attempting".

== Bibliography ==
- Making Sense of Wine (1989, revised and updated 2004)
- Making Sense of Burgundy (1990)
- Making Sense of California Wine (1992)
- Passion for Piedmont (1997)
- Matt Kramer's New California Wine (2004)
- Matt Kramer's Making Sense of Italian Wine (2006)
- Matt Kramer on Wine: A Matchless Collection of Columns, Essays, and Observations by America's most original and lucid Wine Writer (2010)

== See also ==
- List of wine personalities
