= Wine cellar =

Storage room for wine

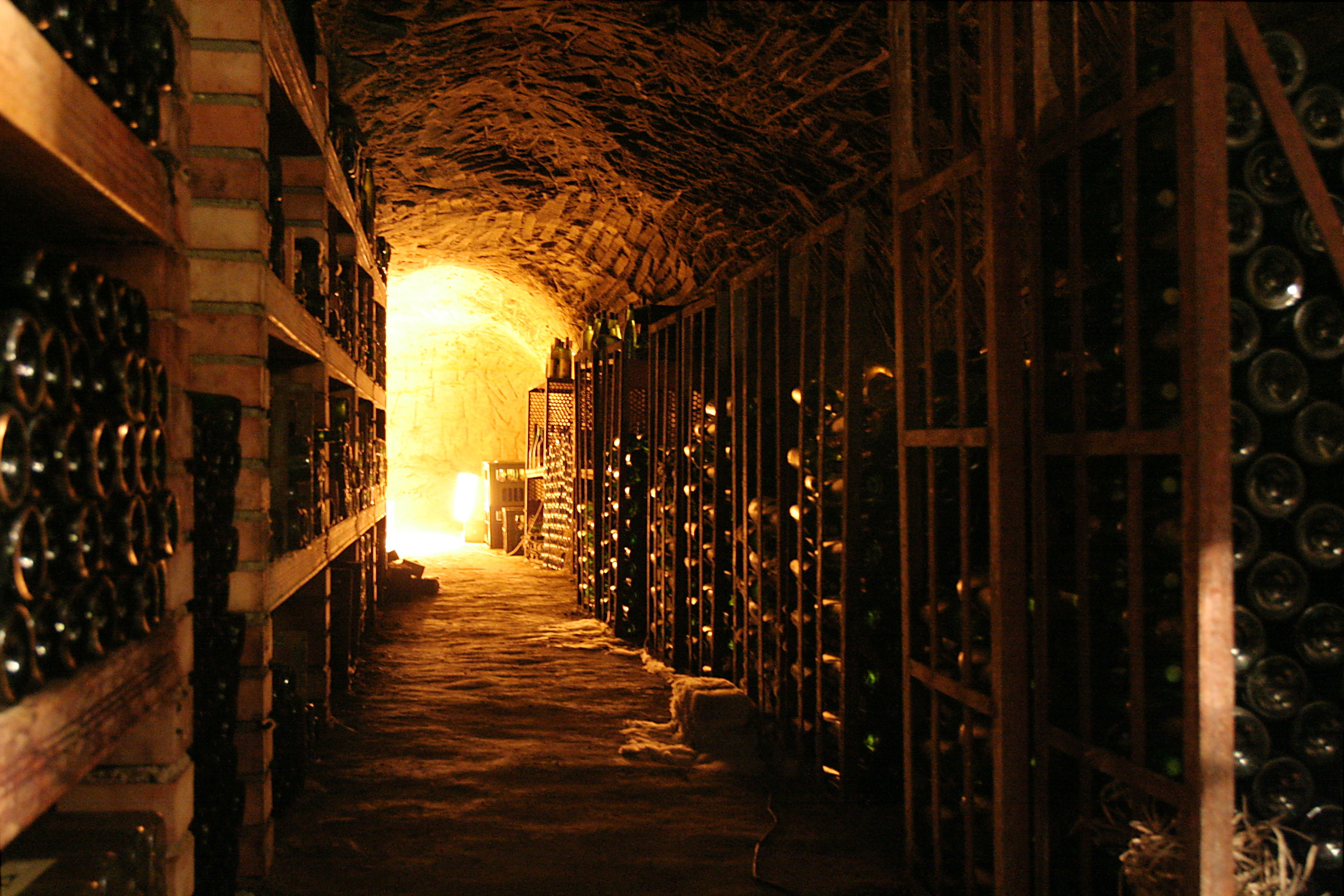
Wine cellar in Chvalovice, Czechia

A wine cellar is a storage room for wine in bottles or barrels, or more rarely in carboys, amphorae, or plastic containers. In an active wine cellar, important factors such as temperature and humidity are maintained by a climate control system. In contrast, passive wine cellars are not climate-controlled, and are usually built underground to reduce temperature swings. An aboveground wine cellar is often called a wine room, while a small wine cellar (fewer than 500 bottles) is sometimes termed a wine closet. The household department responsible for the storage, care and service of wine in a great mediaeval house was termed the buttery. Large wine cellars date back over 3,700 years.

== Purpose ==
Wine cellars protect alcoholic beverages from potentially harmful external influences, providing darkness, constant temperature, and constant humidity. Wine is a natural, perishable food product issued from fermentation of fruit. Left exposed to heat, light, vibration or fluctuations in temperature and humidity, all types of wine can spoil. When properly stored, wines not only maintain their quality but many actually improve in aroma, flavor, and complexity as they mature. Depending on their level of sugar and alcohol, wines are more or less sensitive to temperature variances; wine with higher alcohol and/or sugar content will be less sensitive to temperature variance.

== Conditions ==
Wine can be stored satisfactorily between 7–18 °C (45–64 °F) as long as any variations are gradual. A temperature of 13 °C (55 °F), much like that found in the caves used to store wine in France, is ideal for both short-term storage and long-term aging of wine. Wine generally matures differently and more slowly at a lower temperature than it does at a higher temperature. When the temperature swings are significant, 14 degrees or more, it will cause the wine to breathe through the cork which significantly speeds up the aging process. Between 10–14 °C (50–57 °F), wines will age normally.

== Active versus passive ==
Wine cellars can be either active or passively cooled. Active wine cellars are highly insulated and need to be properly constructed. They require specialized wine cellar conditioning and cooling systems to maintain the desired temperature and humidity. In a very dry climate, it may be necessary to actively humidify the air, but in most areas this is not necessary. Passive wine cellars must be located in naturally cool and damp areas with minor seasonal and diurnal temperature variations, for example, a basement in a temperate climate. Passive cellars may be less predictable, but cost nothing to operate and are not affected by power outages.

== Humidity ==
Some wine experts debate the importance of humidity for proper wine storage. In the Wine Spectator, writer Matt Kramer noted a French study which claimed that the relative humidity within a bottle is maintained 100% regardless of the closure used or the orientation of the bottle. However, Alexis Lichine says that low humidity can be a problem because it may cause organic corks to dry prematurely. One inch (2.5 cm) of gravel covering the floor periodically sprinkled with a little water was recommended to retain the desired humidity.

== Gallery ==
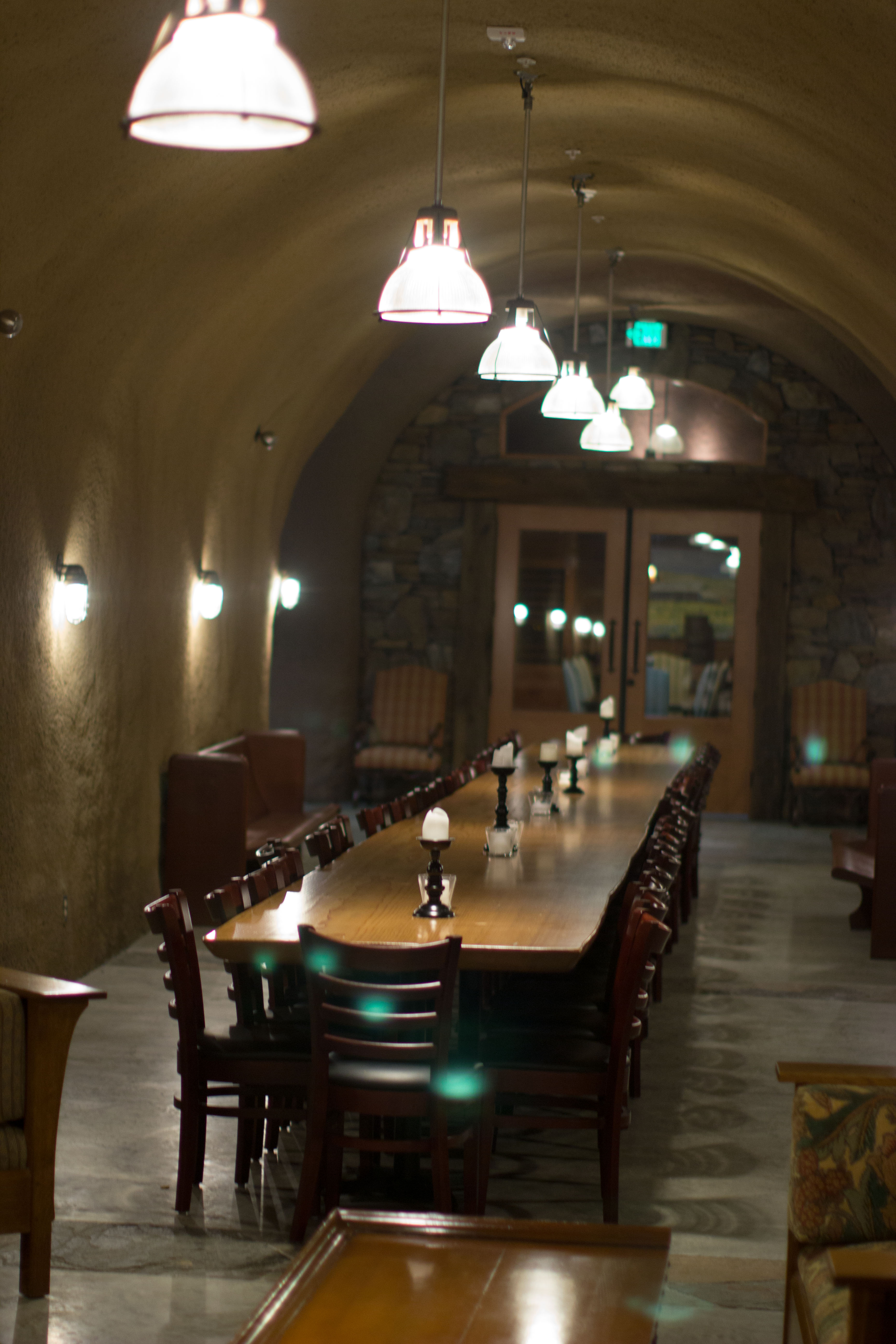
A table for drinking and gathering in a Sonoma wine cellar

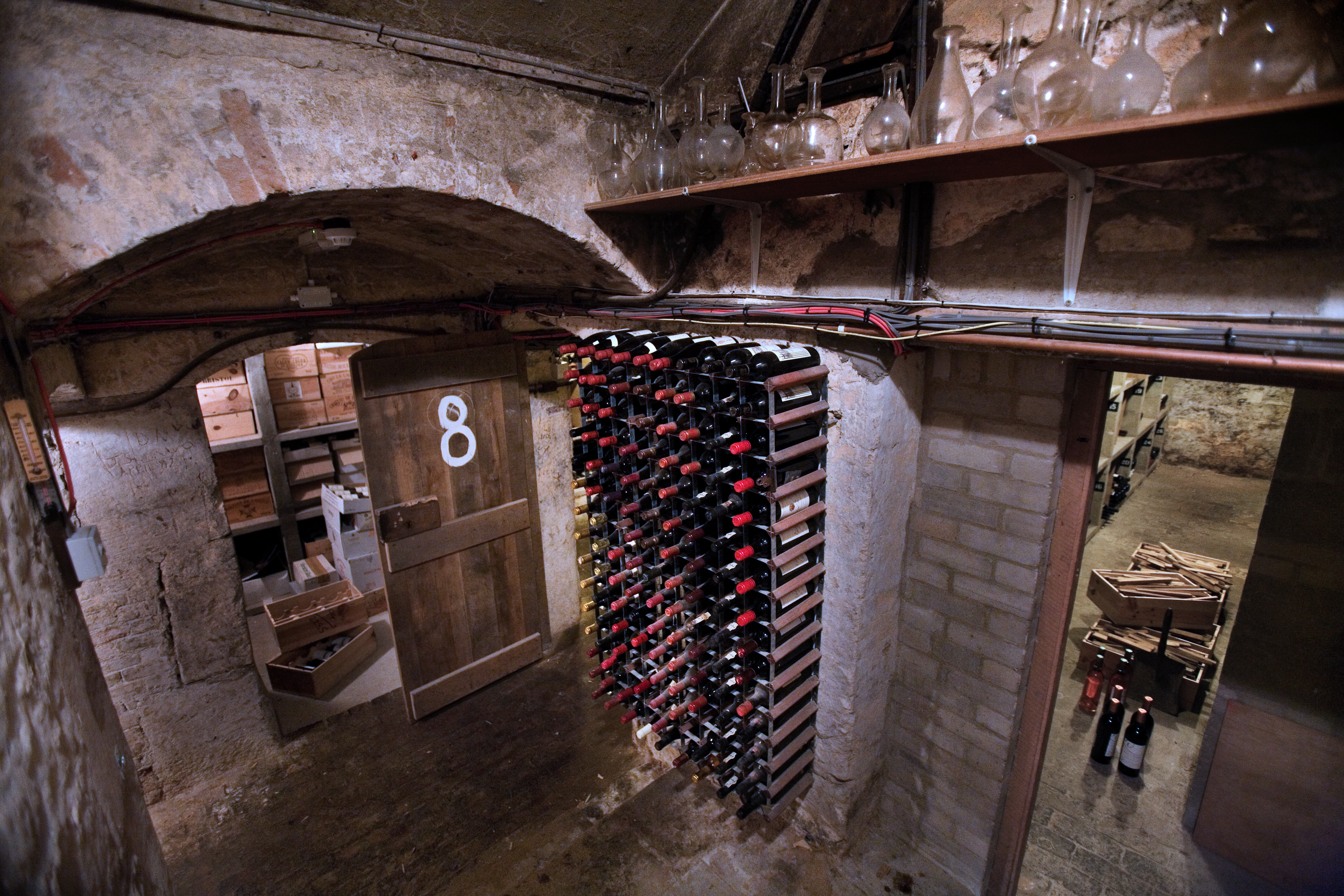
Wine bottles stored in a wine cellar at Jesus College, Oxford

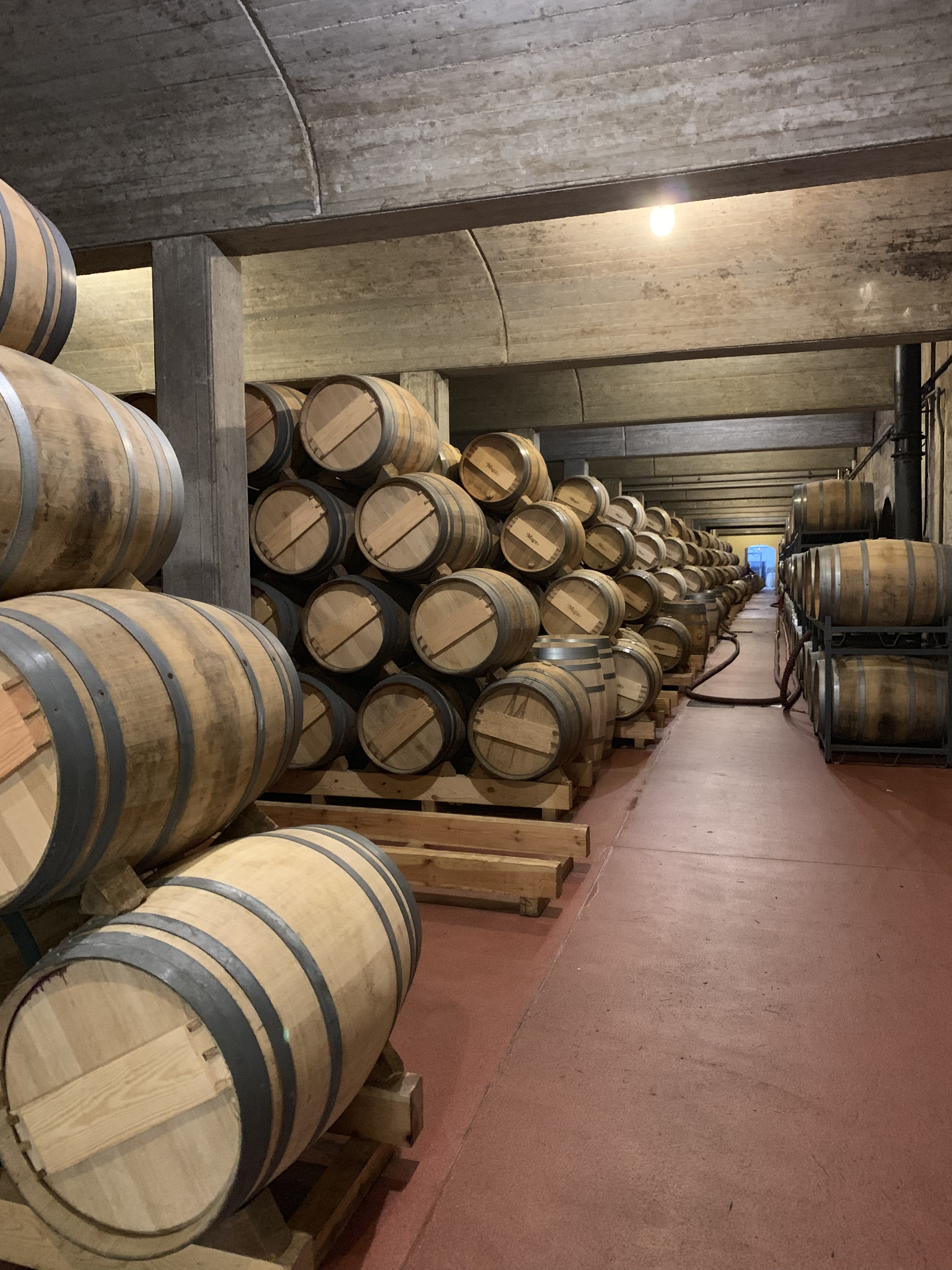
Muga Wine cellar, Haro, Spain

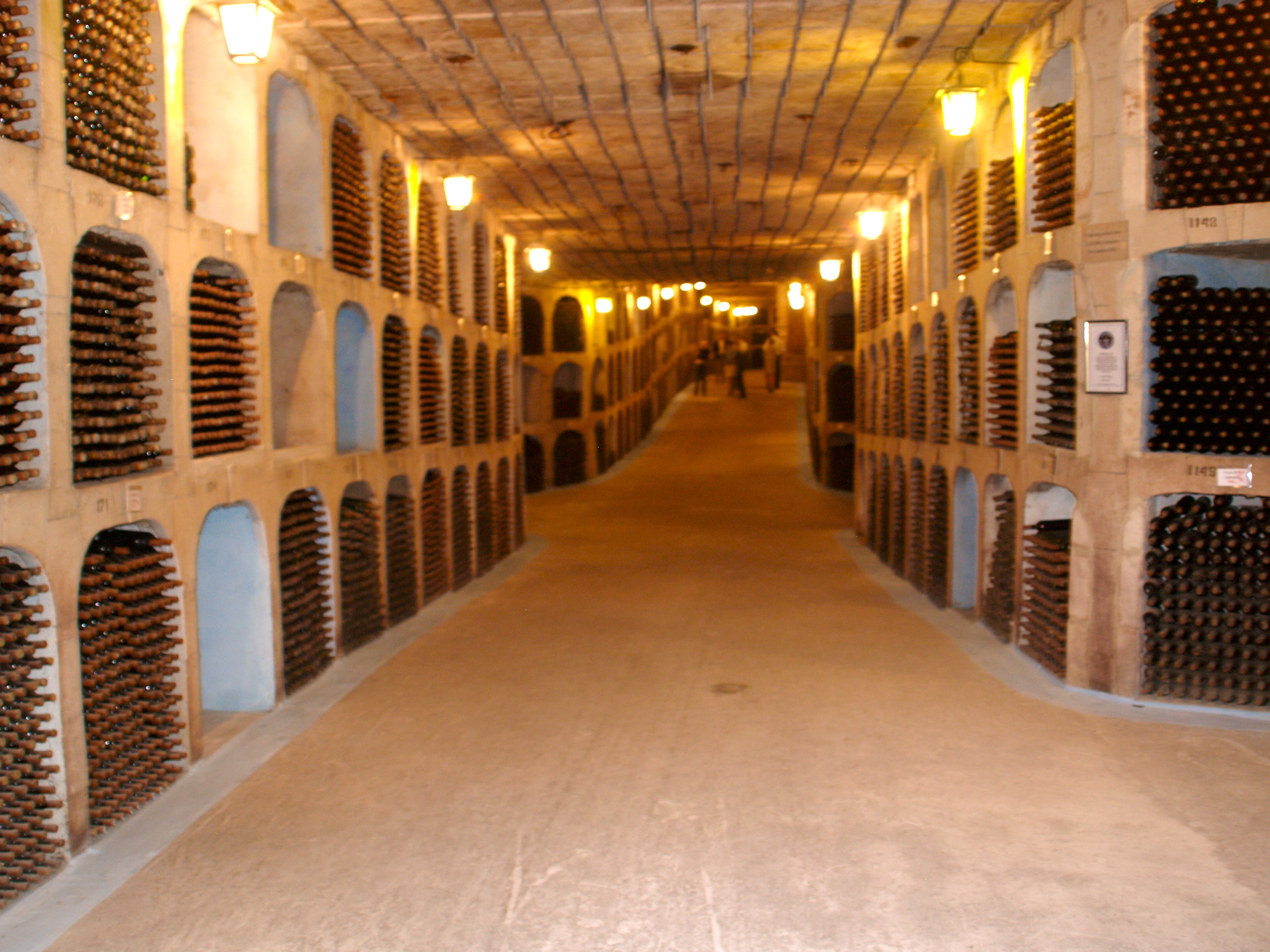
Mileștii Mici has the world's biggest wine cellars.

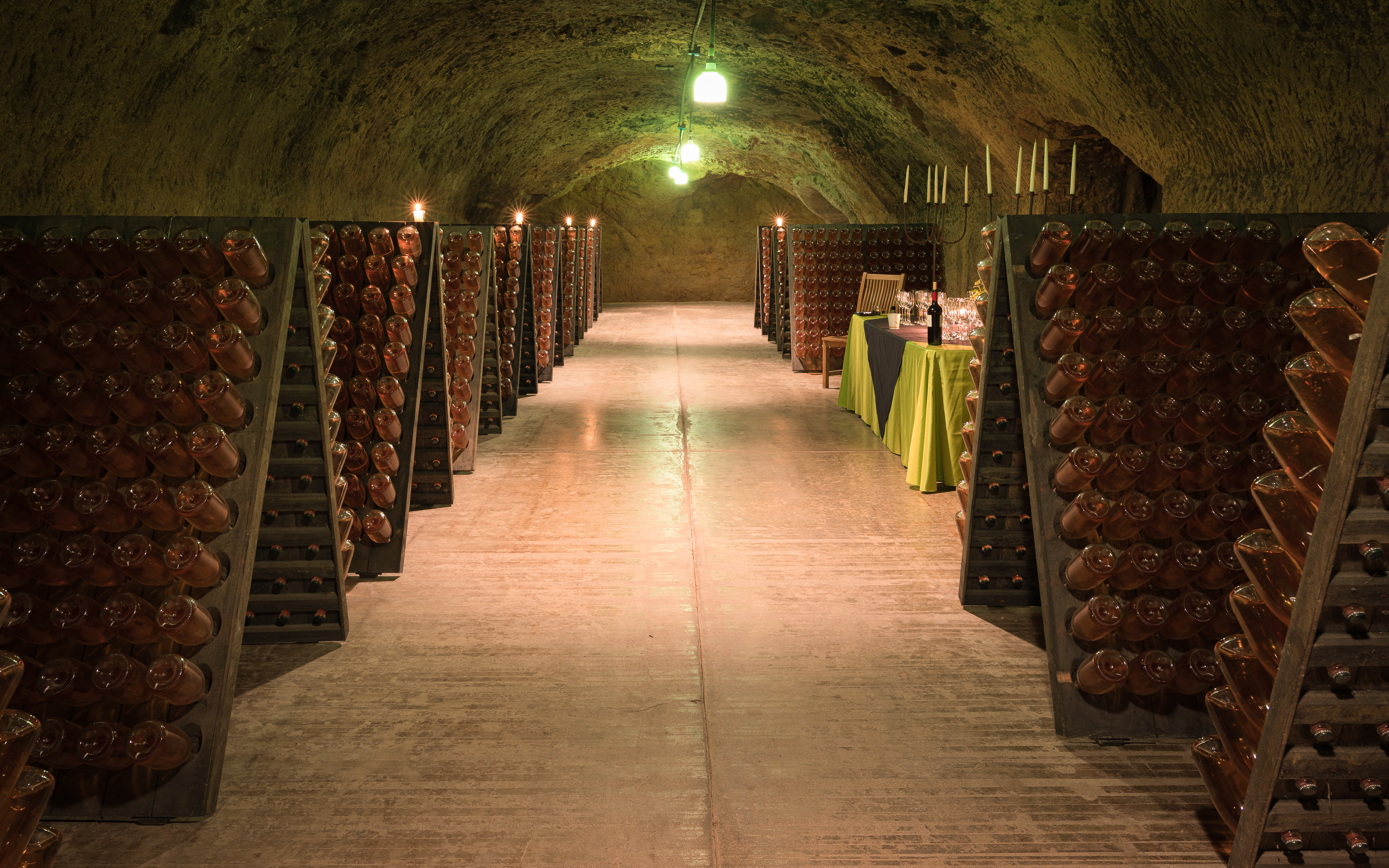
Wine cellar of Schramsberg Vineyards, Napa

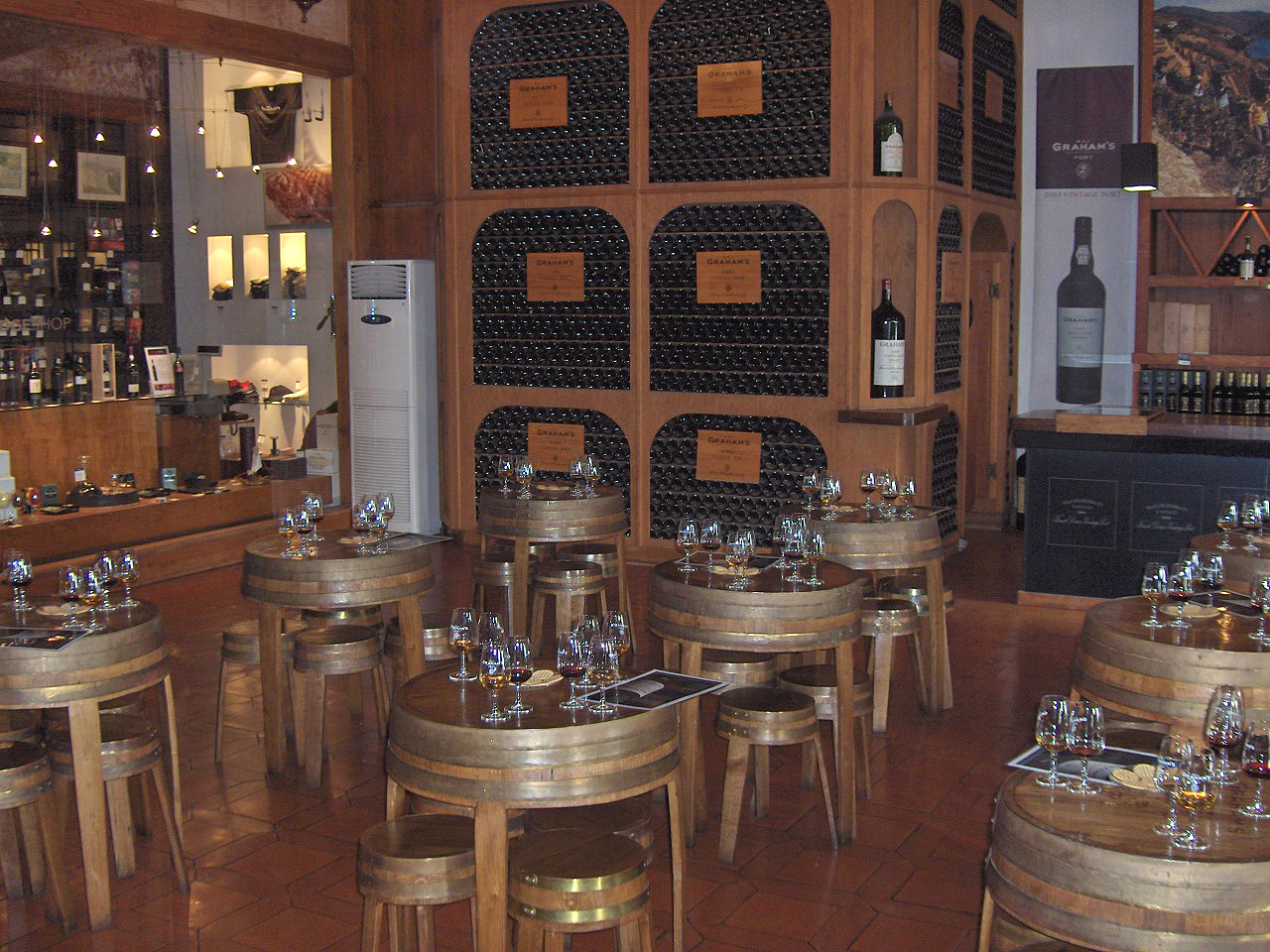
Tasting room of port wine in a wine cellar of a producer

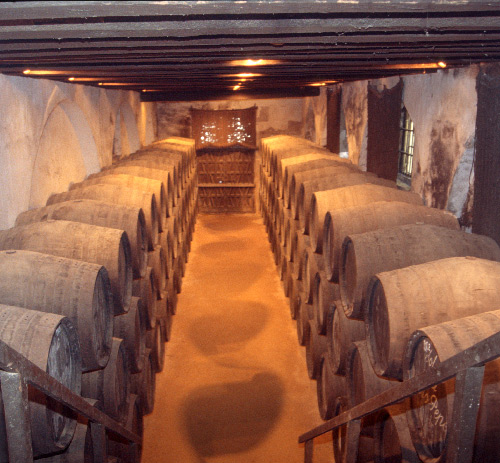
A sherry solera over the ground

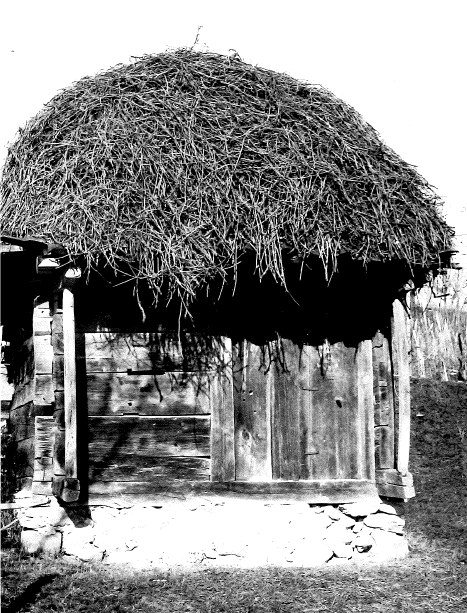
An above ground wine cellar in Runcu - Romania

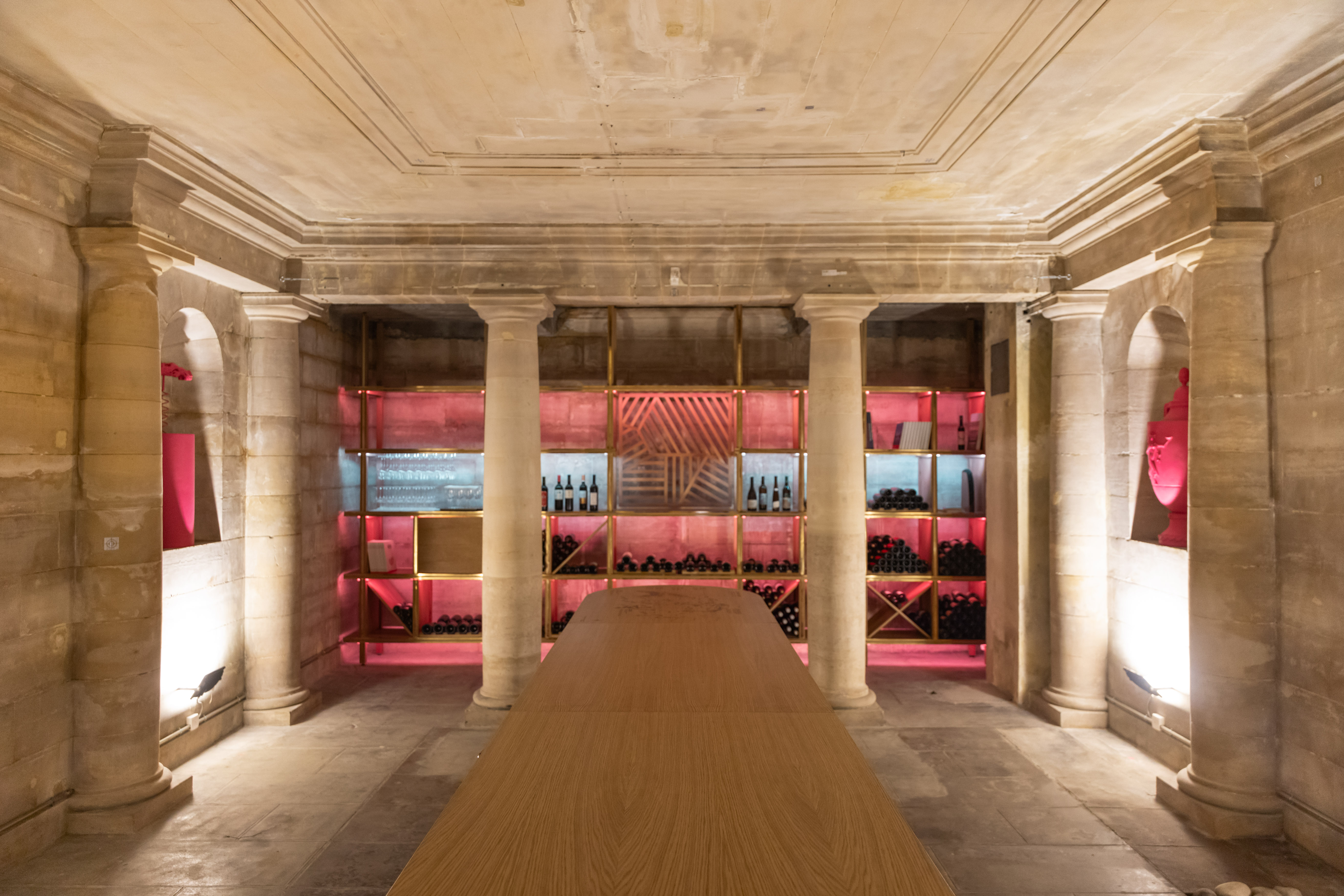
The former nymphaeum of the Hôtel de Besenval after its transformation into a wine cellar in 2024

== See also ==
- Storage of wine
- Aging of wine
- CellarTracker (database)
