= Wine cave =

Area for the storage of wine

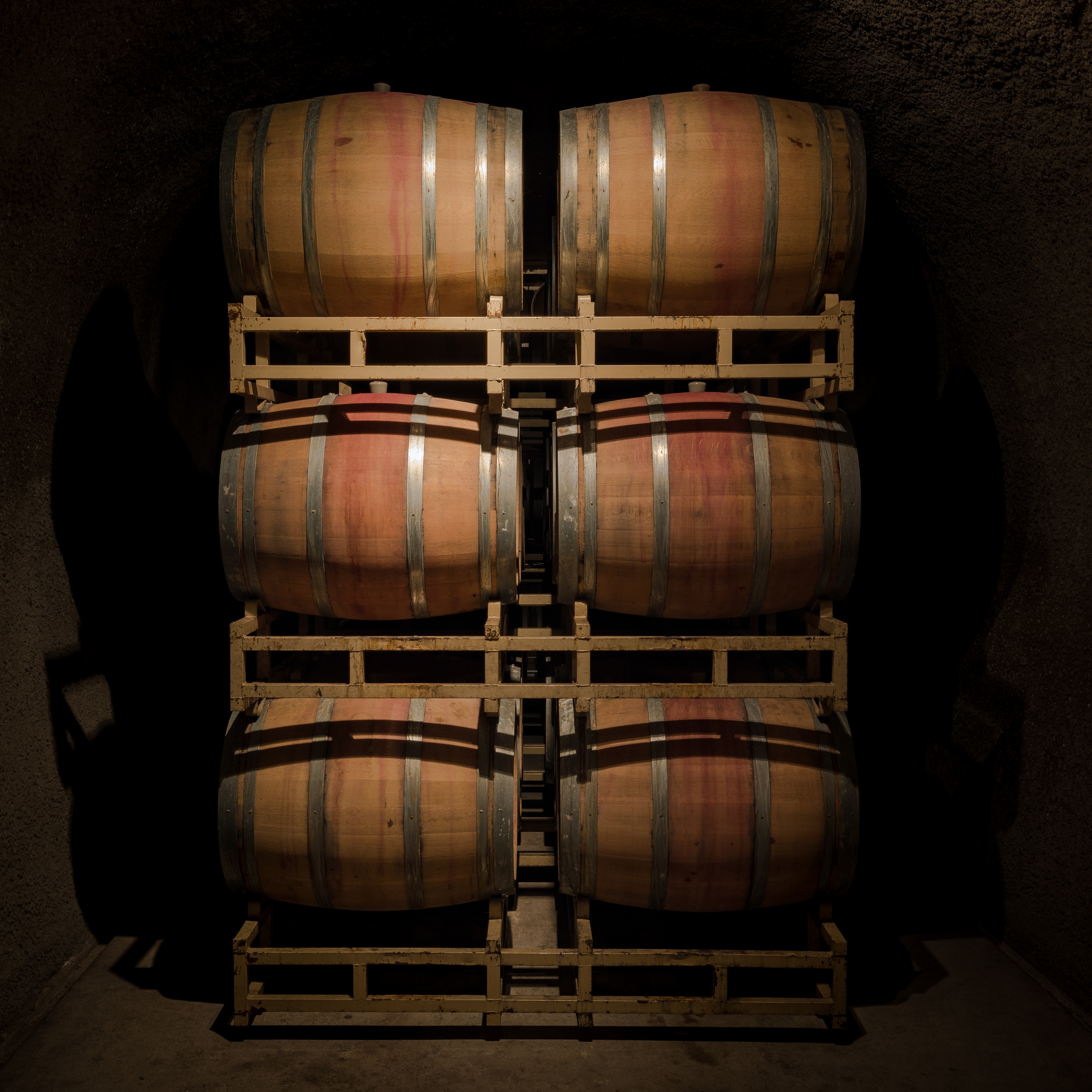
Oak barrels in the wine cave of Rutherford Hill Winery in Napa County, California.

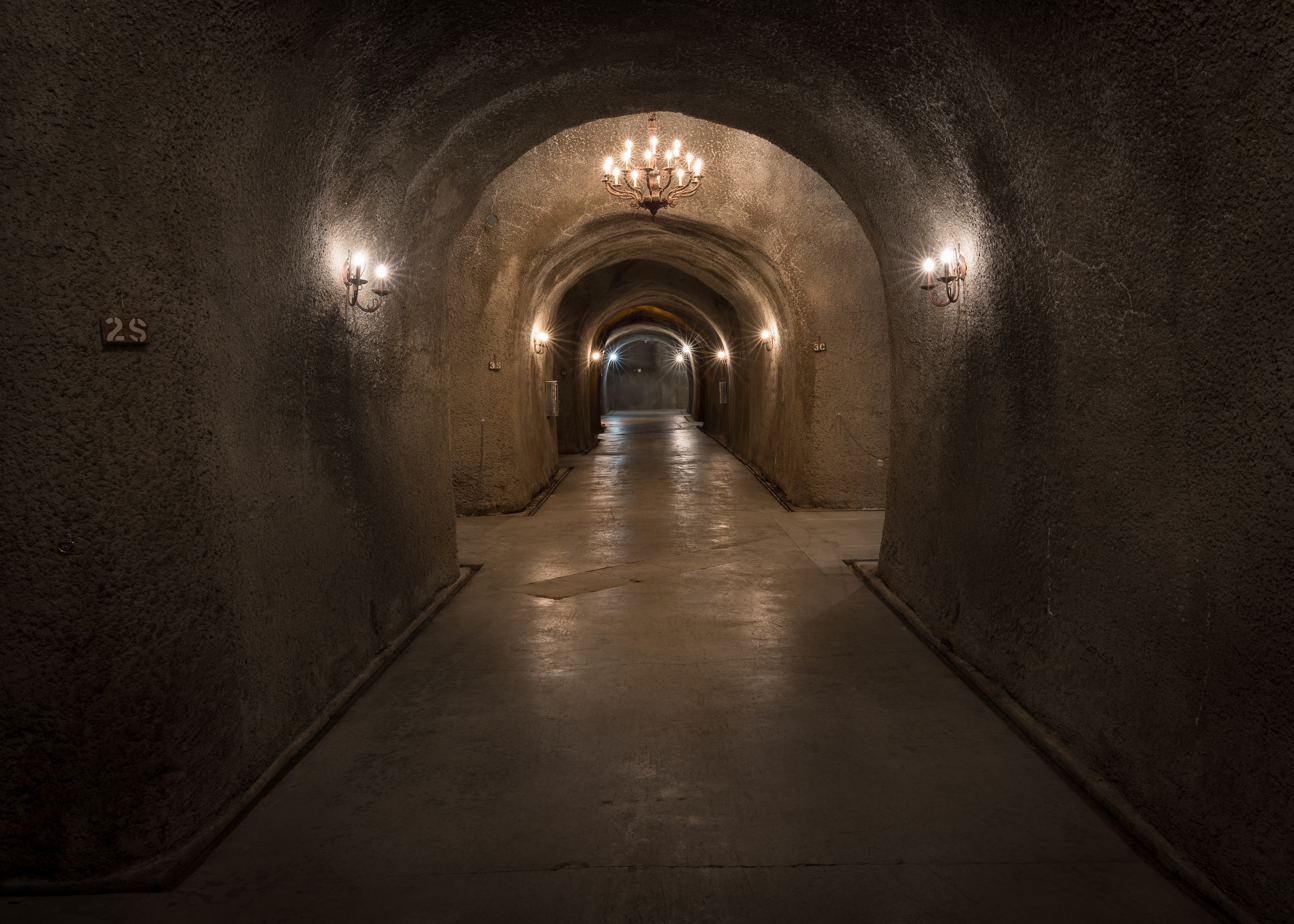
Underground wine cave of the Rutherford Hill winery in Napa County, California.

Underground Wine cellars are subterranean structures for the storage and the aging of wine. They are an essential part of the global wine industry. The construction of wine caves involves specialized underground building techniques to create optimal conditions for wine preservation.

The use of extensive underground spaces for wine storage extends the tradition of wine cellar, offering advantages such as energy efficiency and efficient land use. Wine caves naturally maintain high humidity and cool temperatures, both of which are crucial for the proper storage and aging of wine.

== History ==
The history of wine cave construction in the United States dates back to the 1860s in Sonoma, and the 1870s in the Napa Valley region. In 1857, Agoston Harazsthy founded Buena Vista Winery and in 1862, Buena Vista Winery's Press House was completed, and in 1864, a second building now called the Champagne Cellars was completed. In total, Buena Vista Winery had five caves among the two buildings in operation in 1864. Jacob Schram, a German immigrant and barber, founded Schramsberg Vineyards near Calistoga, California in 1862. Eight years later, Schram found new employment for the Chinese laborers who had recently finished constructing tunnels and grades over the Sierra Nevada Mountains for the Union Pacific Transcontinental Railroad. He hired them to dig a network of caves through the soft Sonoma Volcanics Formation rock underlying his vineyard.

Another Chinese workforce took time away from their regular vineyard work to excavate a labyrinth of wine-aging caves beneath the Beringer Vineyards near St. Helena, California. These caves exceeded 1,200 ft (370 m) long, 17 ft (5.2 m) wide and 7 ft (2.1 m) high. The workers used pick-axes and shovels – and on occasion, chisel steel, double jacks and black powder – to break the soft rock. They worked by candlelight, and removed the excavated material in wicker baskets. At least 12 wine storage caves were constructed by these methods.

From the 1890s until the early 1970s no new wine caves were built in the United States, with many existing ones being abandoned or falling into disrepair over time. Wine cave building resumed in 1972 when Alf Burtleson Construction started the rehabilitation of the old Beringer wine caves, and was followed by the design and construction of new caves.

In 1982, the Far Niente Winery completed the first of these “new age” wine caves in the Napa Valley AVA. The cave was only 60 ft (18 m) long and was used exclusively to age the wine and to store empty barrels. In 1991, 1995, and 2001, the caves were expanded. New rooms and storage areas were added, featuring different crown heights and intriguing shapes. An octagonal room was constructed for a wine library and a round domed room was added in the complex's center. Far Niente Winery caves now encompass about 40,000 sq ft (3,700 m^{2}).

In 1991, Condor Earth Technologies Inc. joined with Alf Burtleson on the design and construction of the elaborate Jarvis Wine Cave project. Over 45,000 sq ft (4,200 m^{2}) of underground winery and cave space was constructed, with cave spans exceeding 85 ft (26 m) in width. At Jarvis, the entire winery is contained within the tunneled areas, including crushing, fermentation, barrel storage, bottling, lab, office, marketing, and hospitality areas. These caves are open for public tours by appointment.

== Humidity ==
High humidity minimizes evaporation. Wine makers consider humidity over 75% for reds and over 85% for whites to be ideal for wine aging and barrel storage. Humidity in wine caves ranges naturally from 70 to 90%.

In Northern California, wine barrel evaporation in a surface warehouse is on the order of 4 U.S. gallons (15 liters) per each 60 U.S. gallons (230 liters) barrel per year. In a wine cave, barrel evaporation is reduced to about 1 U.S. gallon (3.8 liters) per barrel per year.

Since red wines are usually barreled and aged for two years, this represents a 10% gross volume loss difference. For white wines, which are barreled and aged for about one year, a 5% loss difference is realized, a significant savings.

== Temperature ==
The wine industry has long considered a constant temperature between 55 and 60 °F (13 and 16 °C) to be optimal for wine storage and aging. The air temperatures in Northern California result in a uniform underground temperature of about 58 °F (14 °C), optimal for wine caves. A surface warehouse requires energy to cool, heat, and humidify. While the most basic wine cave can cost over $100 per sq ft to construct, reduced energy costs result in a net savings over the long term.

== Land use ==
In the Napa-Sonoma wine growing region, as in many areas of California, land values are high. Non-agricultural development is often restricted. A storage warehouse reduces the land available to grow grapes, impacts open space and natural habitats, and precludes other land uses. Land-use regulation in California places limitations on the types and locations of land development. Many land use restrictions and permitting requirements do not apply to underground space. As of 2004, there were an estimated 130 to 150 caves used for wine aging, barrel storage, and tasting rooms in Northern California.

== Marketing ==
Marketing is an important component of the modern wine industry, and many caves serve varied marketing and public relations functions. Recently constructed caves contain commercial and private kitchens, wine libraries, concert and exhibit halls, staff offices, elevators, restrooms, and other amenities. Some have high-end interiors, including ceramic and stone flooring, masonry-lined walls and ceilings, sculpture and artwork, mood lighting, fountains, waterfalls, and chandeliers. At Stag's Leap Wine Cellars, a Foucault pendulum swings continuously across a bed of black sand in the central exhibit hall.

== Wine cave construction ==
The challenge for the design and construction of most wine caves is to create a fairly wide span in weak rock with low cover. The size of a typical wine barrel storage cave is 13 to 18 ft (4.0 to 5.5 m) wide and 10 to 13 ft (3.0 to 4.0 m) high. Constructed caves, however, range up to 85 ft (26 m) in width and 50 ft (15 m) in height; difficult to achieve in poor quality rock.

In areas of complex geology, good portal sites are hard to find. A typical wine cave is constructed with two or more portal sites, for safety and operational reasons. At least one portal leads directly outside, but in many cases at least one portal makes a direct connection to a winery building.

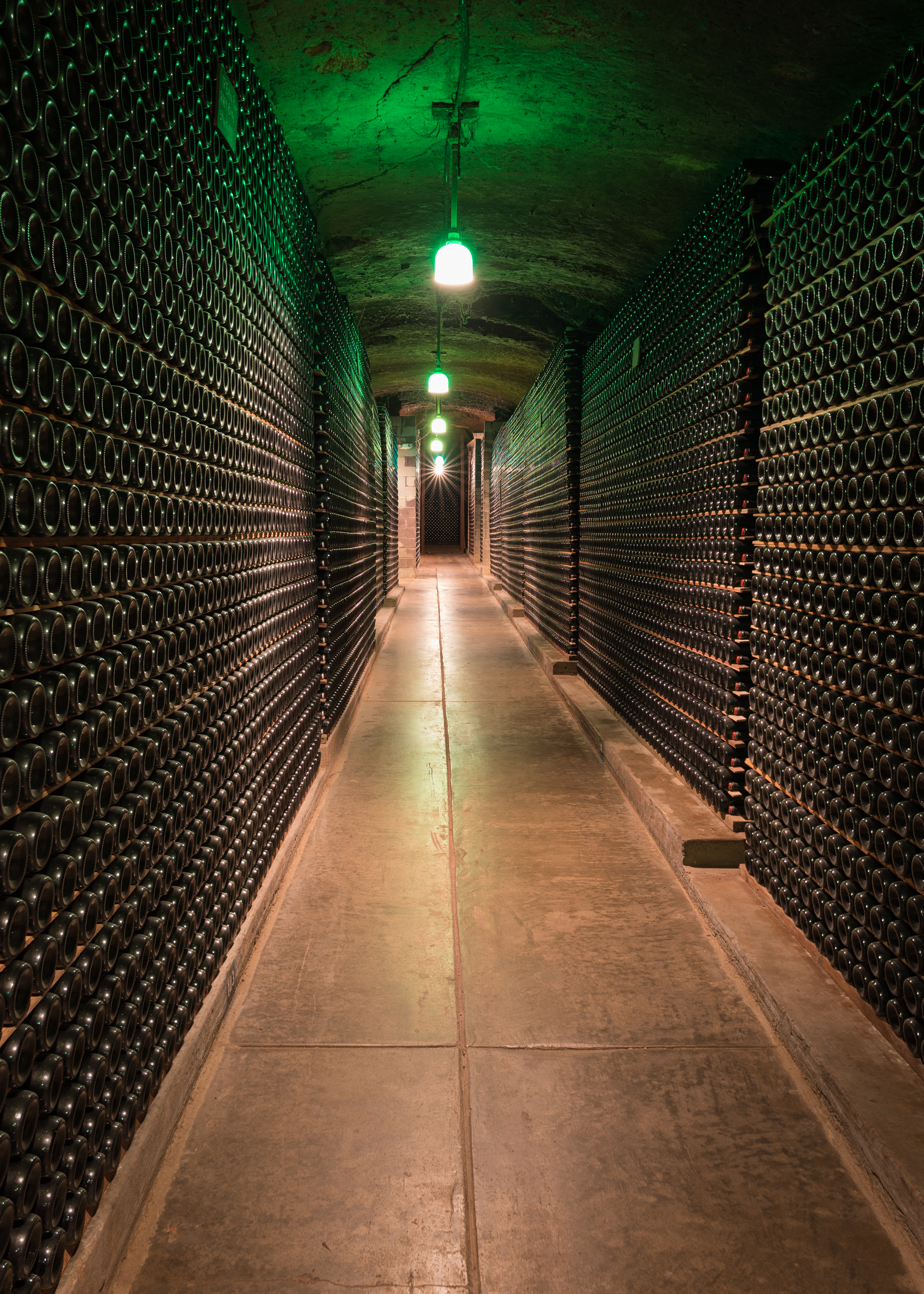
The wine cave at Schramsberg Vineyards in Napa Valley AVA.

Most portals into the wine caves have rock/soil overburden heights less than 0.2 times their entrance heights and widths. The height of the portal face normally ranges from 12 to 20 ft (3.7 to 6.1 m). The portal areas are seldom stripped of the loose soil material and the portals are cut from the native ground surface using excavators. The side slopes of the portal are often laid back to 0.5H:1V or steeper, and the portal face is excavated to vertical or near vertical.

The construction of cave interiors can be complicated by the elaborate curves and labyrinth-style floor plans selected by some owners for their wine caves. As the ground surface slopes upward, providing more cover and usually sounder rock, caves can accommodate multiple drifts. Where possible, the cave is designed and constructed to provide at least 1.2 times their width of cover at intersections. Room and pillar layouts, similar to underground mine design, provide an economical construction arrangement. Tunnel legs are usually 30 to 100 ft (9.1 to 30.5 m) in length and pillars are typically a minimum of 20 ft (6.1 m) wide.

On most occasions, the New Austrian Tunneling Method (single or multiple face), also known now as Sequential Excavation Method (SEM), with minor innovative technology advances, is used to excavate and support wine caves.

The caves are typically excavated in an inverted horseshoe shape with a crown radius and with straight or curved legs. The tunnels are usually excavated using a tunnel roadheader or a milling head attachment on an excavator. The spoils behind the roadheader conveyor belt are dumped on the invert and mucked out using a rubber-tired skid loader or a load-haul-dump (LHD) mining machine.

Initially, the excavation advance is likely to be limited to 2 ft (0.6 m) without initial ground support. Once turned under, and depending on ground conditions, the unsupported advance may be increased to 4 ft (1.2 m), 6 ft (1.8 m), and longer increments. The maximum advance without initial ground support may reach 20 ft (6 m) or more in stable volcanic ash tuff. In sheared serpentinite, deeply weathered lava rock or wet clayey ground, however, unstable ground conditions may limit the unsupported advance to less than 2 ft (0.6 m).

Shotcrete reinforcement and ground support is utilized at the tunnel portals and in the interior of the wine caves. At the portals, soil nail and shotcrete walls are typically used for permanent support and are constructed from the top down in lifts. Soil nails are installed 4 to 6 ft (1.2 to 1.8 m) apart in the horizontal and vertical directions. The shotcrete is typically a minimum of 6 inches (15 cm) thick and reinforced with welded wire fabric. The typical 4,000 psi (28 MPa) design strength mix is applied using the wet process.

Within the caves, the initial ground support is usually fiber-reinforced shotcrete. A minimum of 2 inches (5.1 cm) thickness of wet mix shotcrete is applied around the exposed ground perimeter following each day's advance. As cave dimensions and ground conditions require, additional layers of shotcrete and welded wire fabric follow on subsequent days. The shotcrete mix is a 4,000 psi (28 MPa) compressive strength design. In some cases, pattern or spot rock bolts are also installed. Where wider and taller halls are used, modeling is employed to assist with the liner design.

Interior finishing of the caves is an integral part of the construction process. Waterproofing details are important for the interiors of wine caves. Wet spots and water seeps are unsightly, and can cause maintenance and safety problems. Moisture vapor migration through the cave liner, however, is desirable to maintain humidity.

After the cave complex has been completely excavated, waterproofed, and initially supported, a 2 inches (5.1 cm) thickness of final shotcrete or plain/colored gunite is applied to the walls and arch. Utility conduits and piping are encased within the final layer of shotcrete in the walls and arch and placed under the concrete floor slab. Reinforced concrete slabs are usually 6 in (15 cm) thick and are underlain by subdrain.

To support their varied uses, wine cave complexes may contain as many as 13 different utility systems. These include systems for hot and cold domestic water and processing water, electric power, lighting, sound and water features, battery emergency power, compressed gas systems, communications and radio relays, automatic ventilation, and computerized sensors and climate controls.

== See also ==
- Wine cellar
- Storage of wine
