= Wilhelm Haarmann =

German chemist (1847–1931)

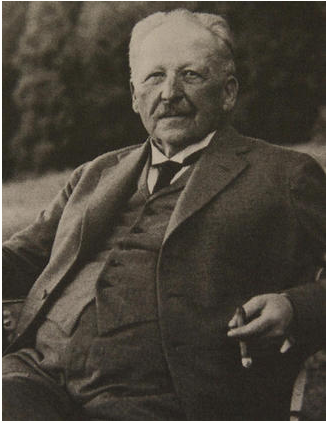
- German chemist who firstly synthesized vanillin
- Born: 24 May 1847; Holzminden, Germany
- Died: 6 March 1931 (aged 83); Höxter, Germany
- Education: University of Berlin, University of Göttingen
- Scientific career
- Workplaces: University of Göttingen
- Doctoral advisor: August Wilhelm von Hofmann

Gustav Ludwig Friedrich Wilhelm Haarmann (24 May 1847 – 6 March 1931) was a German chemist and together with Karl Reimer and Ferdinand Tiemann as scientific consultant founded the Haarmann & Reimer chemical plant for the production of vanillin. Vanillin is the primary flavor component of vanilla and one of the most widely used flavoring agents in the food and fragrance industries.

Beginning in 1866, Haarmann studied at the Mining academy Clausthal later he changed to the University of Göttingen. He joined August Wilhelm von Hofmann 1869 at the University of Berlin. He received his PhD in Göttingen 1872. Together with Ferdinand Tiemann, both working with Hoffmann, Haarmann founded 1875 Haarmann's Vanillinfabrik, producing vanillin from coniferin. The Reimer-Tiemann reaction discovered by Karl Reimer opened an alternative path to vanillin and Reimer joined the company which was renamed to Haarmann & Raimer.

Haarmann & Raimer was bought by the Bayer AG in 1953 and became an independent company again in 2003 under the name Symrise.
