= Lignostilbene alphabeta-dioxygenase =

Lignostilbene alpha beta-dioxygenase

Identifiers
- EC no.: 1.13.11.43
- CAS no.: 124834-28-2

Databases
- IntEnz: IntEnz view
- BRENDA: BRENDA entry
- ExPASy: NiceZyme view
- KEGG: KEGG entry
- MetaCyc: metabolic pathway
- PRIAM: profile
- PDB structures: RCSB PDB PDBe PDBsum
- Gene Ontology: AmiGO / QuickGO
Search
- PMC: articles
- PubMed: articles
- NCBI: proteins

Lignostilbene alphabeta-dioxygenase (EC 1.13.11.43) is an enzyme that catalyzes the chemical reaction

3,3'-dimethoxy-trans-stilbene-4,4'-diol
O_{2}
2
vanillin

The two substrates of this enzyme are 3,3'-dimethoxy-trans-stilbene-4,4'-diol and oxygen. Its product is two equivalents of vanillin. The enzyme from Pseudomonas species cleaves the ethylene bond in a general class of natural lignin derivatives called lignostilbenes.

This enzyme belongs to the family of oxidoreductases, specifically those acting on single donors with O_{2} as oxidant and incorporation of two atoms of oxygen into the substrate (oxygenases). The oxygen incorporated need not be derived from O_{2}. The systematic name of this enzyme class is 1,2-bis(4-hydroxy-3-methoxyphenyl)ethylene:oxygen oxidoreductase (alphabeta-bond-cleaving). It employs one cofactor, iron.
