= Aryl-aldehyde oxidase =

aryl-aldehyde oxidase

Identifiers
- EC no.: 1.2.3.9
- CAS no.: 82657-93-0

Databases
- IntEnz: IntEnz view
- BRENDA: BRENDA entry
- ExPASy: NiceZyme view
- KEGG: KEGG entry
- MetaCyc: metabolic pathway
- PRIAM: profile
- PDB structures: RCSB PDB PDBe PDBsum
- Gene Ontology: AmiGO / QuickGO
Search
- PMC: articles
- PubMed: articles
- NCBI: proteins

In enzymology, aryl-aldehyde oxidase (EC 1.2.3.9) is an enzyme that catalyzes the chemical reaction

benzaldehyde
+ H_{2}O
O_{2}
H_{2}O_{2}
O_{2}
H_{2}O_{2}
benzoic acid

The substrates of this enzyme are an aromatic aldehyde, oxygen, and water. Its two products are the corresponding aromatic carboxylic acid and hydrogen peroxide. The enzyme acts on benzaldehyde to give benzoic acid (shown) and on other substrates such as vanillin.

This enzyme belongs to the family of oxidoreductases, specifically those acting on the aldehyde or oxo group of donor with oxygen as acceptor. The systematic name of this enzyme class is aryl-aldehyde:oxygen oxidoreductase.
