= Vanillin synthase =

vanillin synthase

Identifiers
- EC no.: 4.1.2.41
- CAS no.: 449168-60-9

Databases
- IntEnz: IntEnz view
- BRENDA: BRENDA entry
- ExPASy: NiceZyme view
- KEGG: KEGG entry
- MetaCyc: metabolic pathway
- PRIAM: profile
- PDB structures: RCSB PDB PDBe PDBsum
- Gene Ontology: AmiGO / QuickGO
Search
- PMC: articles
- PubMed: articles
- NCBI: proteins

In enzymology, a vanillin synthase (EC 4.1.2.41) is an enzyme that catalyzes the chemical reaction

3-hydroxy-3-(4-hydroxy-3-methoxyphenyl)propanoyl-CoA $\rightleftharpoons$ vanillin + acetyl-CoA

Hence, this enzyme has one substrate, 3-hydroxy-3-(4-hydroxy-3-methoxyphenyl)propanoyl-CoA, and two products, vanillin and acetyl-CoA.

This enzyme belongs to the family of lyases, specifically the aldehyde-lyases, which cleave carbon-carbon bonds. The systematic name of this enzyme class is 3-hydroxy-3-(4-hydroxy-3-methoxyphenyl)propanoyl-CoA vanillin-lyase (acetyl-CoA-forming). Other names in common use include 3-hydroxy-3-(4-hydroxy-3-methoxyphenyl)propionyl-CoA:vanillin lyase, and (acetyl-CoA-forming).
