= Karl Reimer =

German chemist and industrialist

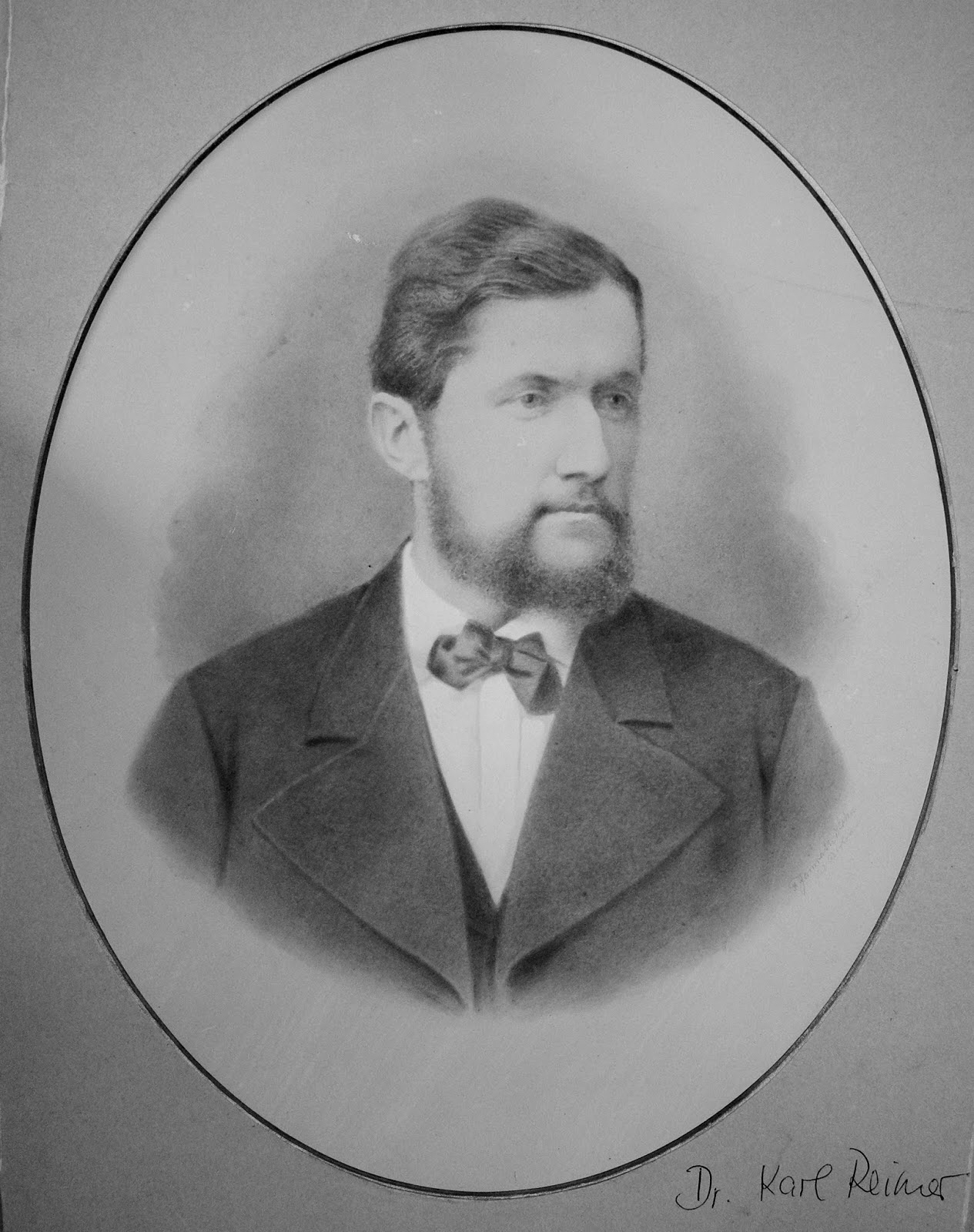
Reimer circa 1871.

Karl Ludwig Reimer (born December 25, 1845, in Leipzig, † January 15, 1883 in Berlin) was a German chemist and industrialist. He's responsible for the cheap synthesis of the chemical compound Vanillin, having discovered the Reimer-Tiemann Reaction.

== Early life and education ==
Reimer was born on December 25, 1845, in Leipzig as the son of bookseller Karl August Reimer (1801–1858). His father moved the Weidmann bookstore from Leipzig to Berlin in 1854.

After taking his Abitur, having attended school at the Friedrichs-Gymnasium Berlin in 1865, he started his studies in Göttingen and Greifswald, but was interrupted by the draft of the German War of 1866. Only after recovering from a severe war-related typhoid fever was he able to continue his chemistry studies in Greifswald, then Heidelberg and finally in Berlin.

The German Chemical Society in Berlin elected him as a student member on March 22, 1869.

At the Friedrich Wilhelm University, he began his dissertation with natural chemist August Wilhelm von Hofmann. The Franco-Prussian War of 1870-1871 interrupted more intensive research with Hofmann. Nonetheless, Reimer received his doctorate in Chemistry, focusing on Biochemistry, (It was then mainly referred to as Natural Chemistry, which is since outdated) in July 1871 under Hofmann with “On Some Derivatives of Fermentation Butyl Alcohol”.

== Career ==
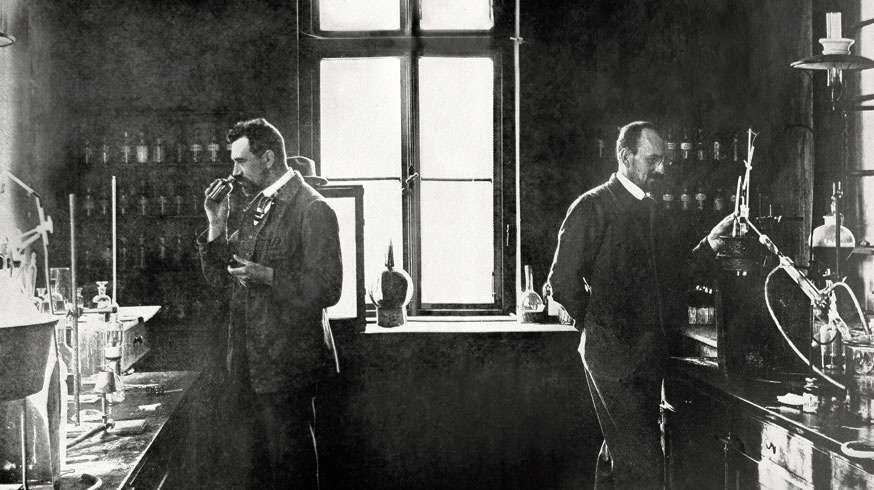
Labor Firma Haarmann & Reimer, circa 1878. Links K. Reimer.

Karl then received short-term employment with Botanist Theodor Hartig at the Königl, Eberswalde Forestry Academy and Hofmann at the university. The latter also referred Reimer to the new Berlin chemical factory founded by Carl August Ferdinand Kahlbaum in 1870, before earning his doctorate, in Schlesische Straße. In the spring of 1875, due to the sudden death of Theodor Goldschmidt, he took over the management of his factory for Tin preparations at short notice and on a temporary basis.

At the end of 1875, Karl Reimer independently developed a new synthetic route to aromatic aldehydes by reacting aqueous phenolate solutions with chloroform (Reimer's reaction).

Compared to Ferdinand Tiemann, Karl Reimer decided not to carry out much scientific research into his own reaction's proofs and uses. In 1876, Tiemann offered Reimer an equal share in his up-and-coming product, Haarmann's Vanillinfabrik, developed in 1874, in Holzminden as co-owner - he accepted.

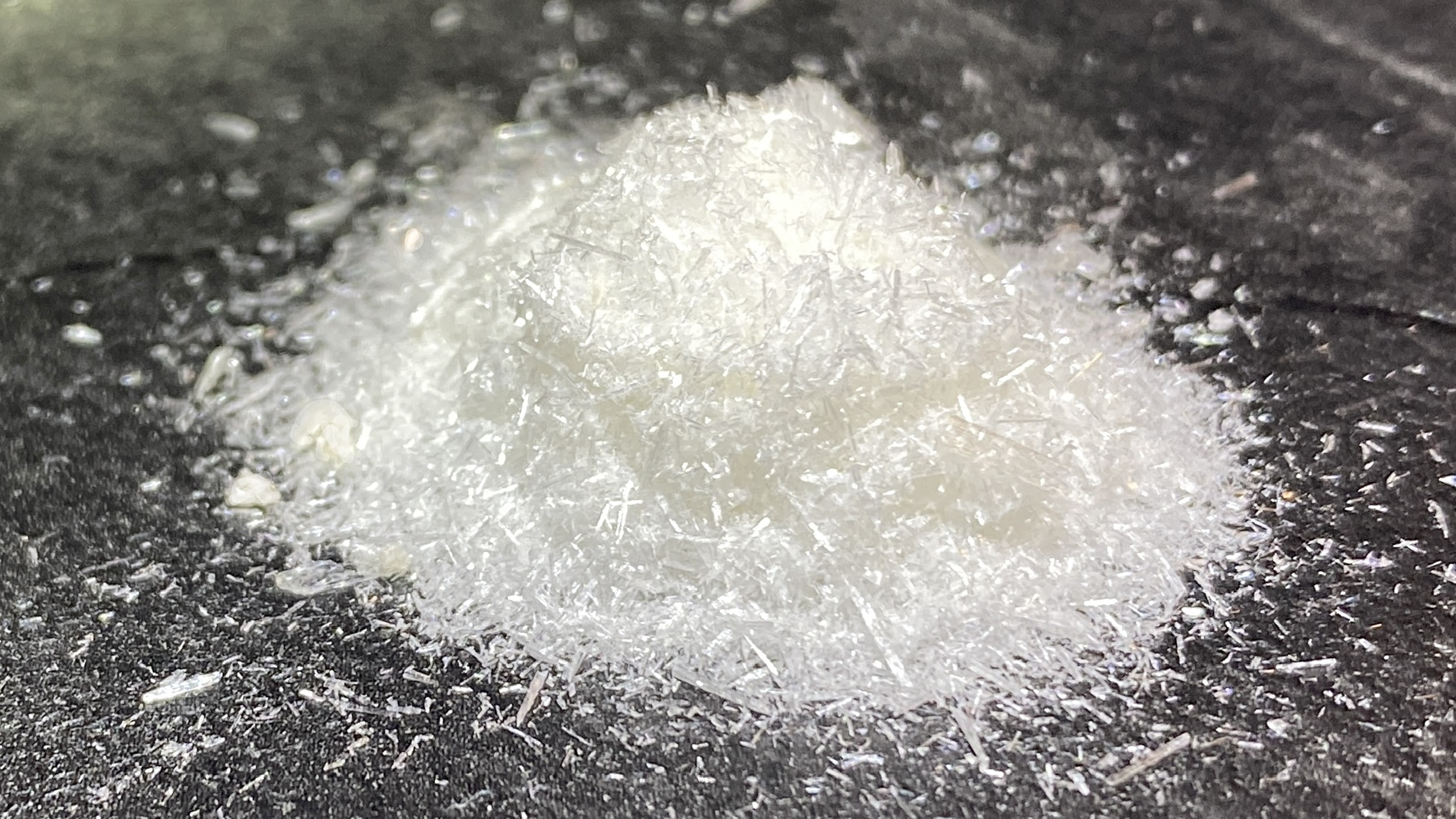
Vanillin crystals.

Reimer's reaction, as Tiemann theorized, had made possible for the first time a convenient and cheap synthesis of Vanillin by reacting Guaiacol with Chloroform - as opposed to using the inefficient Vanillin plant, which is and was 300 times more expensive.

Thanks to Tiemann's numerous publications, "Reimer's reaction" became generally known as the Reimer-Tiemann reaction. The Vanillin factory of the three chemists Tiemann, Haarmann (Haarmann added after 1876) and Reimer was renamed Haarmann & Reimer in 1876 (now known as Symrise).

In 1881, Reimer left the company due to illness and died shortly afterwards in January 1883.
