= Symrise =

German chemical company

Symrise AG
- Type: Aktiengesellschaft
- Traded as: FWB: SY1; FWB: SY1U; DAX component (SY1)
- ISIN: DE000SYM9999; US87155N1090
- Industry: Chemicals
- Founded: 2003; 23 years ago
- Headquarters: Holzminden, Germany
- Key people: Jean-Yves Parisot, CEO and chairman of the executive board); Olaf Klinger; Stephanie Coßmann; Walter Ribeiro; Michael König, (chairman of the supervisory board)
- Products: Flavors and fragrances
- Revenue: ▼€4.92 billion (2025)
- Operating income: ▼€465 million (2025)
- Net income: ▼€249 million (2025)
- Total assets: ▼€7.904 billion (2025)
- Total equity: ▼€3.742 billion (2025)
- Number of employees: 12,745 (Dec 2025)
- Website: www.symrise.com

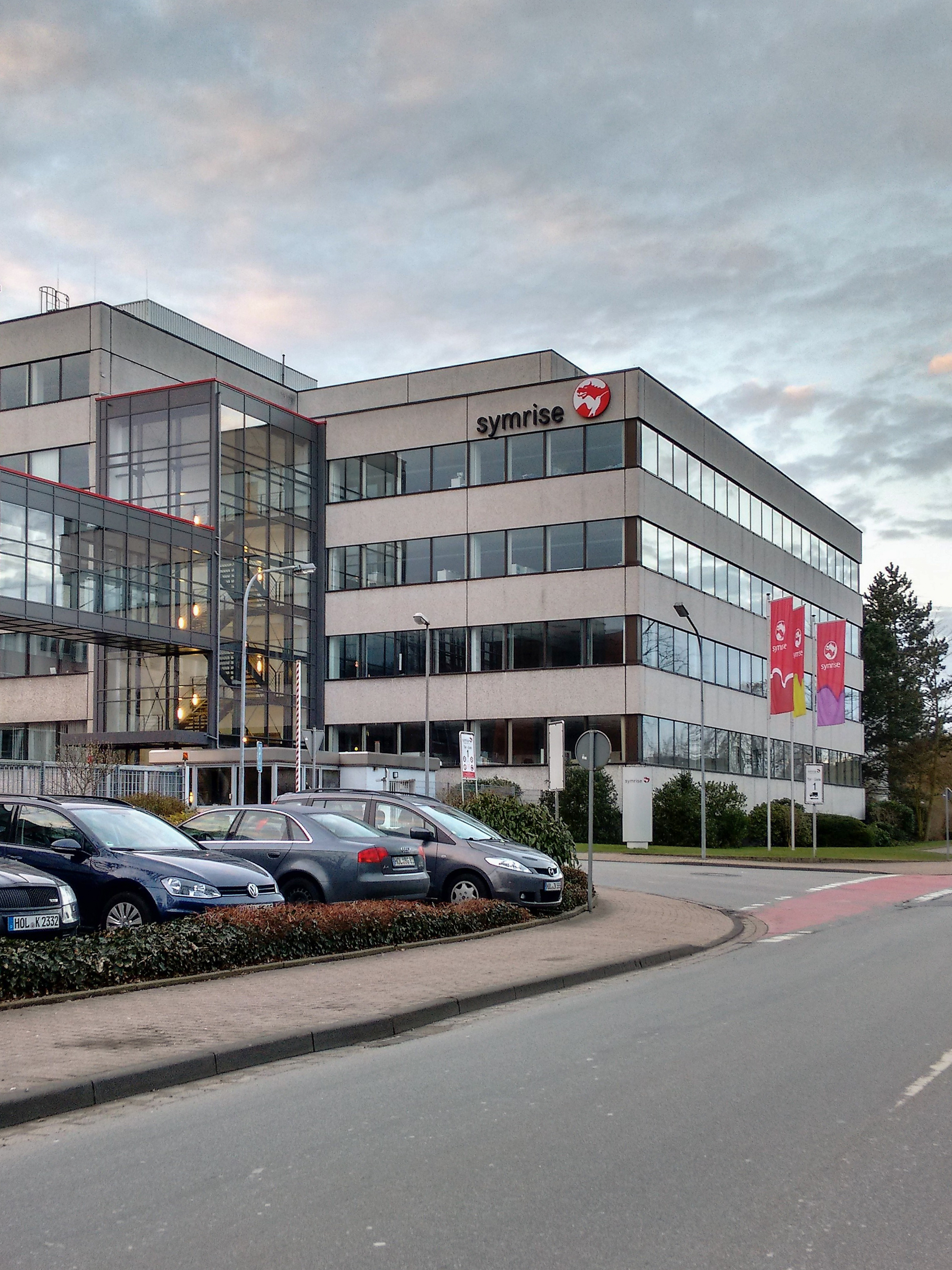
Symrise headquarters in Holzminden, Germany

Symrise AG is a German chemicals company that is a major producer of cosmetic ingredients, flavours and fragrances. Major competitors include Givaudan and Döhler. Symrise is a member of the European Flavour Association. In 2021, Symrise was ranked 4th by FoodTalks' Global Top 50 Food Flavours and Fragrances Companies list.

== History ==
Symrise was founded in 2003 by the merger of Bayer subsidiary Haarmann & Reimer (H&R) and Dragoco, both based in Holzminden, Germany.

=== Haarmann & Reimer ===
Haarmann & Reimer (H&R) was founded in 1874 by chemists Ferdinand Tiemann and Wilhelm Haarmann after they succeeded in first synthesizing vanillin from coniferin. Holzminden was the site where vanillin was first produced industrially.

In 1917, H&R supported Leopold Ružička's unsuccessful three-year project to synthesize irone, a fragrance of violets.

In 1953, H&R was acquired by Bayer. In 1987, H&R acquired Florasynth, a niche fragrance house.

=== Dragoco ===
Dragoco was founded in 1919 by Carl-Wilhelm Gerberding and his cousin August Bellmer.

Horst-Otto Gerberding, majority holder and Chairman of the Executive Board at Dragoco, placed all of his shares into the new Symrise corporation and the merger was completed May 23, 2003.

=== History since 2003 ===
In April 2005, Symrise acquired Flavours Direct, a UK-based manufacturer of compounded flavours and seasonings.

In January 2006, Symrise acquired Hamburg based Kaden Biochemicals GmbH, a producer of specialty botanical extracts.

In November 2006, Symrise announced plans to sell shares worth €650 million in an IPO. Symrise was listed on the Frankfurt Stock Exchange with the trading symbol SY1. With 81,030,358 shares issued at an issue price of €17.25 for a total volume of €1.4 billion, it was the largest German public offering of 2006.

On 19 March 2007, Symrise was added to the German MDAX stock index.

On 12 April 2014, Symrise had announced the acquisition of Diana Group one of the leading manufacturers of natural flavours and the global number 1 for pet food solutions. The transaction was closed on July 29, 2014, and valued at around EUR 1.3 billion of equity and debt.

In November 2020, Symrise announced its purchase agreement with Sensient Technologies Corporation, to acquire its fragrance and aroma business.

Total sales today amount to approximately €4.6 billion.

== Key figures ==
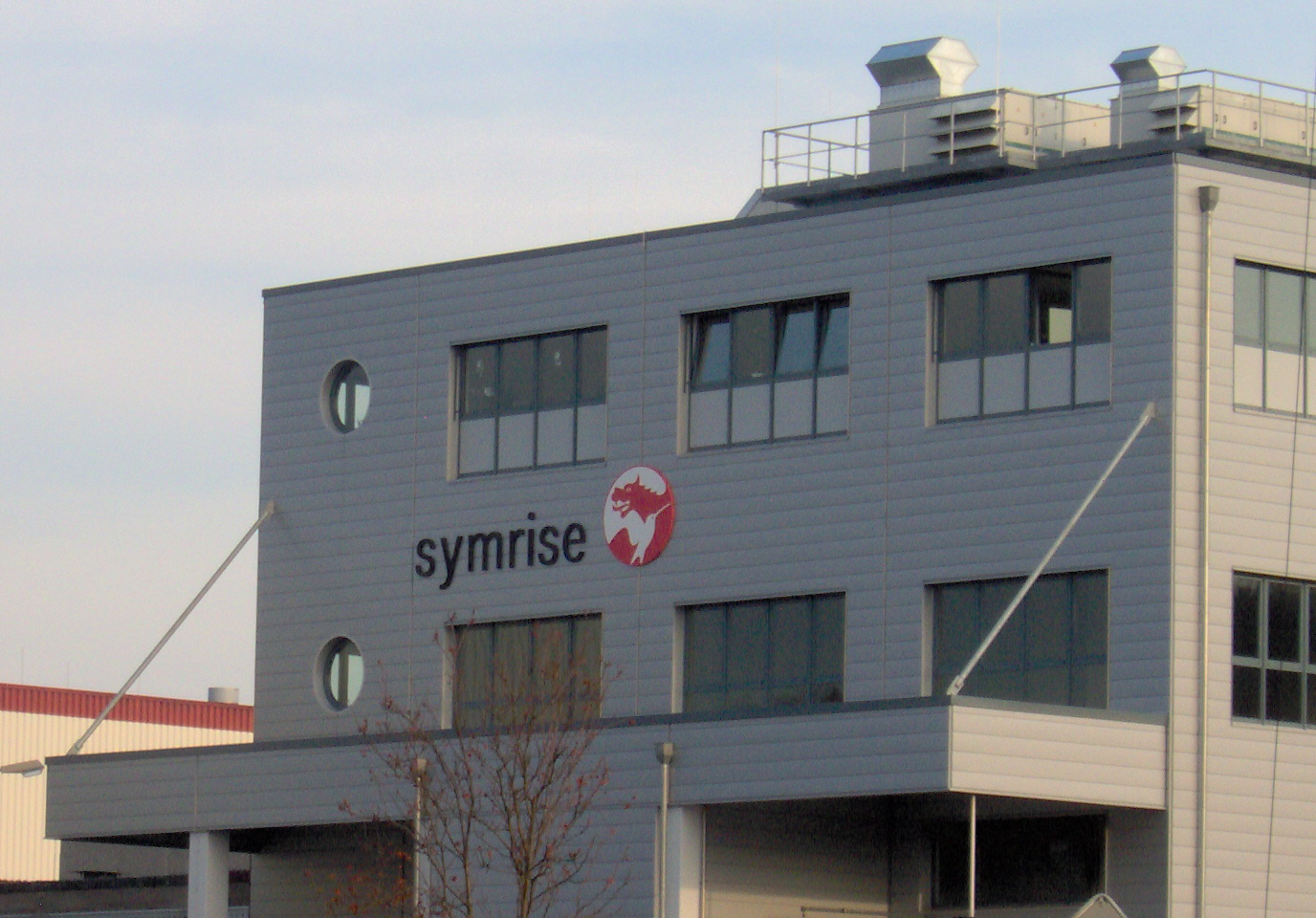
One of the flavor production building

World market share of the relevant fragrance and flavor market (2017)

Raw data
Estimated market share of the eleven largest flavour and fragrance companies, 2017
