= Glucovanillin =

Names
- IUPAC name 3-Methoxy-4-[(2S,3R,4S,5S,6R)-3,4,5-trihydroxy-6-(hydroxymethyl)oxan-2-yl]oxybenzaldehyde
- Other names: Vanilloside; Vanillin 4-O-β-D-glucoside

Identifiers
CAS Number	494-08-6
3D model (JSmol)	Interactive image
ChEBI	CHEBI:179508
ChemSpider	4954574
KEGG	C19808
PubChem CID	6452133
UNII	H81U1KBS6E
CompTox Dashboard (EPA)	DTXSID00197782
- InChI: InChI=1S/C14H18O8/c1-20-9-4-7(5-15)2-3-8(9)21-14-13(19)12(18)11(17)10(6-16)22-14/h2-5,10-14,16-19H,6H2,1H3/t10-,11-,12+,13-,14-/m1/s1 Key: LPRNQMUKVDHCFX-RKQHYHRCSA-N
- SMILES: COC1=C(C=CC(=C1)C=O)O[C@H]2[C@@H]([C@H]([C@@H]([C@H](O2)CO)O)O)O

Properties
Chemical formula	C_{14}H_{18}O_{8}
Molar mass	314.290 g·mol^{−1}
Appearance	Crystalline solid
Melting point	189–190 °C (372–374 °F; 462–463 K)
Solubility in water	Soluble in hot water
- Except where otherwise noted, data are given for materials in their standard state (at 25 °C [77 °F], 100 kPa). Infobox references

Glucovanillin, also known as vanilloside, is a chemical compound found in vanilla beans. Chemically, it is a glucoside composed of glucose and vanillin. Glucovanillin is particularly prevalent in green vanilla beans and upon ripening it is hydrolyzed by the action of the enzyme β-glucosidase which releases vanillin, the major contributor to the aroma and flavor of vanilla. Vanillin is further released from glucovanillin during the curing process of vanilla production.

Glucovanillin has weak antibacterial properties and has served as a lead compound for the development of more potent antibactierial compounds.
