= Coniferin =

Names
- Preferred IUPAC name (2R,3S,4S,5R,6S)-2-(Hydroxymethyl)-6-{4-[(1E)-3-hydroxyprop-1-en-1-yl]-2-methoxyphenoxy}oxane-3,4,5-triol
- Other names • β-D-Glucopyranoside 4-(3-hydroxy-1-propenyl)-2-methoxyphenyl • Coniferyl alcohol β-D-glucoside

Identifiers
CAS Number	531-29-3
3D model (JSmol)	Interactive image
ChEBI	CHEBI:16220
ChEMBL	ChEMBL459056
ChemSpider	4444067
ECHA InfoCard	100.230.647
EC Number	803-885-9
KEGG	C00761
PubChem CID	5280372
UNII	M6616XLU2J
- InChI: InChI=1/C16H22O8/c1-22-11-7-9(3-2-6-17)4-5-10(11)23-16-15(21)14(20)13(19)12(8-18)24-16/h2-5,7,12-21H,6,8H2,1H3/b3-2+/t12-,13-,14+,15-,16-/m1/s1 Key: SFLMUHDGSQZDOW-FAOXUISGBA
- SMILES: O(c1c(OC)cc(/C=C/CO)cc1)[C@@H]2O[C@@H]([C@@H](O)[C@H](O)[C@H]2O)CO

Properties
Chemical formula	C_{16}H_{22}O_{8}
Molar mass	342.344 g·mol^{−1}
Appearance	White crystalline solid
Melting point	186 °C (367 °F; 459 K)
- Except where otherwise noted, data are given for materials in their standard state (at 25 °C [77 °F], 100 kPa). Infobox references

Coniferin is a glucoside of coniferyl alcohol. This white crystalline solid is a metabolite in conifers, serving as an intermediate in cell wall lignification, as well as having other biological roles. It can also be found in the water root extract of Angelica archangelica subsp. litoralis.

Vanillin was first synthesized from coniferin by chemists Ferdinand Tiemann and Wilhelm Haarmann.

== Biosynthesis ==
The enzyme coniferyl-alcohol glucosyltransferase converts coniferyl alcohol to coniferin:

coniferyl alcohol
+ UDP-glucose
UDP
coniferin

It transfers a glucose unit from UDP-glucose, giving uridine diphosphate (UDP) as byproduct.
