= Vanilla =

Spice extracted from Vanilla orchids

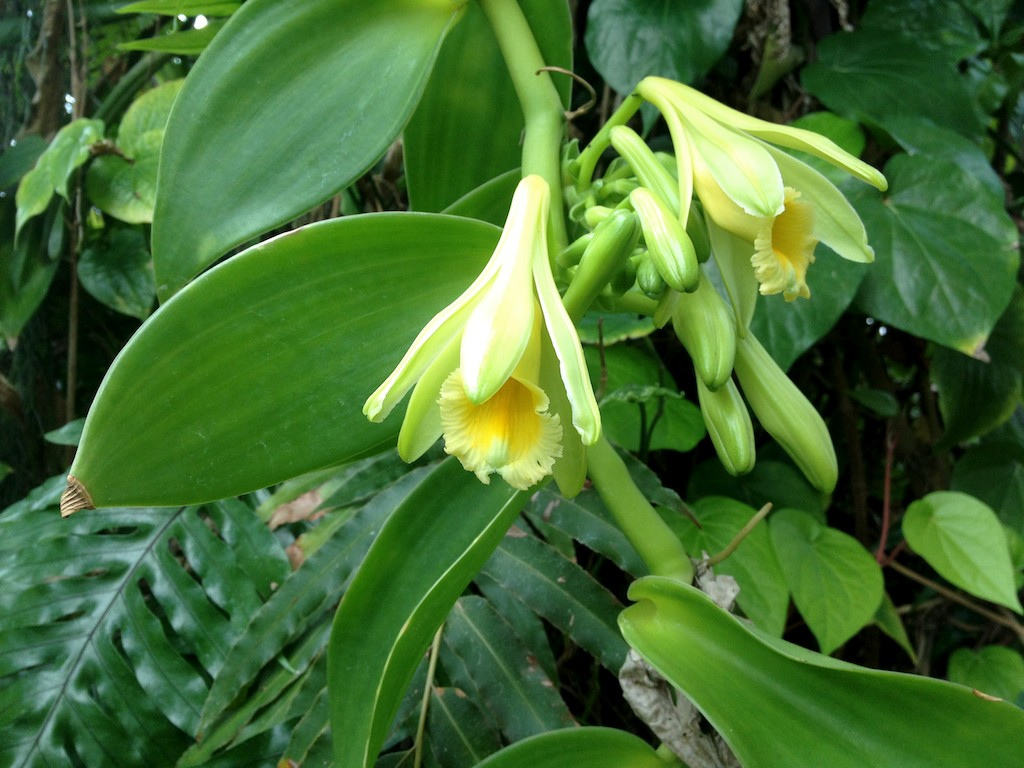
Vanilla planifolia, flower

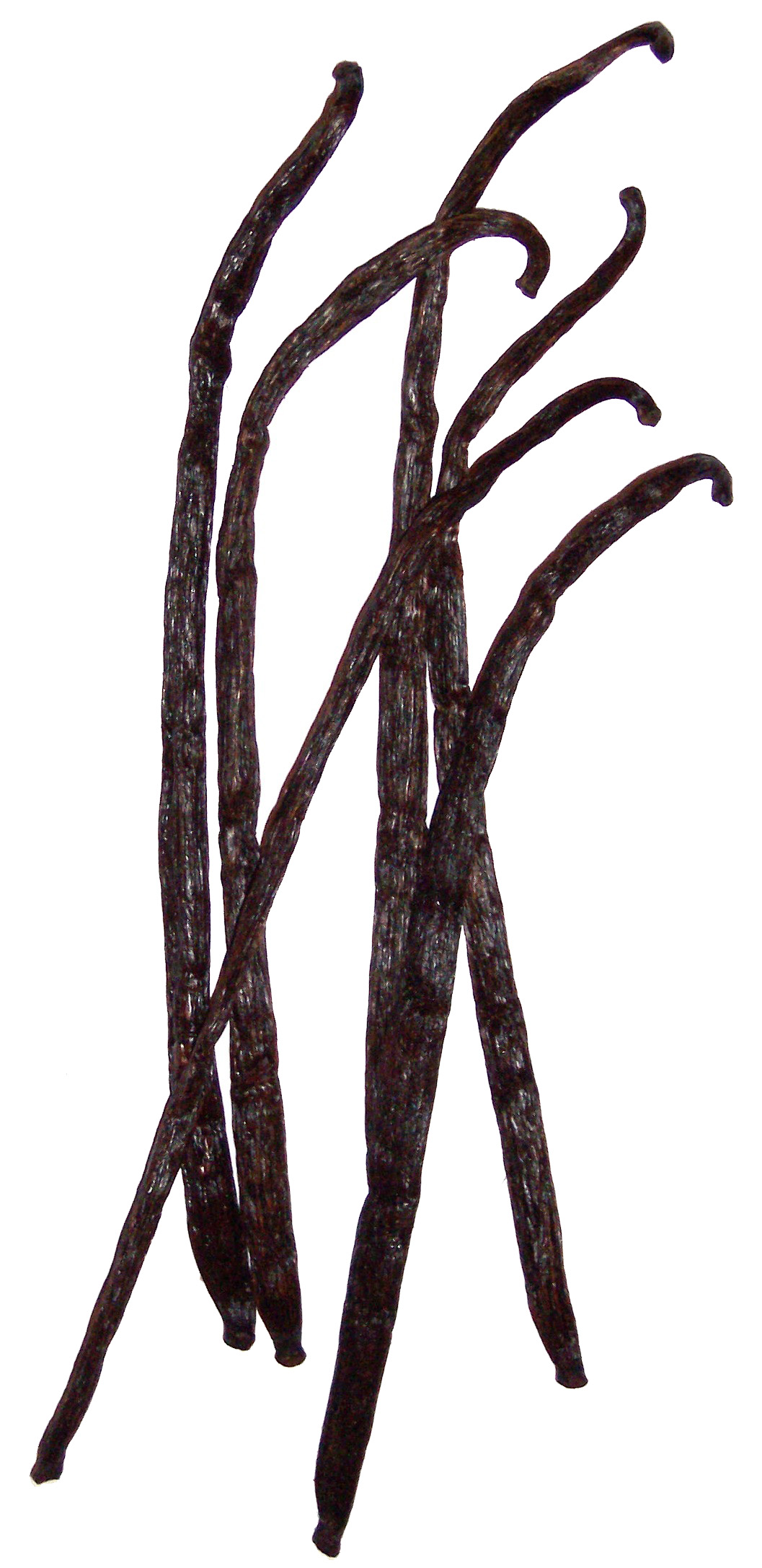
Dried vanilla beans

Vanilla is a spice derived from orchids of the genus Vanilla, primarily obtained from the seed pods of the flat-leaved Mexican and Central American vanilla (V. planifolia).

Vanilla is not autogamous, so pollination is required to produce the pods. In 1837, the Belgian botanist Charles François Antoine Morren discovered this and pioneered a method of artificially pollinating the plant. The method proved financially unworkable and was not deployed commercially. In 1841, Edmond Albius, a 12-year-old enslaved child who lived on the French island of Réunion in the Indian Ocean, discovered that the plant could be hand-pollinated. Hand-pollination allowed global cultivation of the plant.

Three major species of vanilla currently are grown globally, all derived from a species originally found in Mesoamerica, including parts of modern-day Mexico. They are V. planifolia (syn. V. fragrans), grown on Madagascar, Réunion, and other tropical areas along the Indian Ocean; V. × tahitensis, grown in the South Pacific; and V. pompona, found in the West Indies, Central America, and South America. The majority of the world's vanilla is the V. planifolia species, more commonly known as Bourbon vanilla (after the former name of Réunion, Île Bourbon) or Madagascar vanilla, which is produced in Madagascar and neighboring islands in the southwestern Indian Ocean, and in Indonesia. Madagascar's and Indonesia's cultivations produce two-thirds of the world's supply of vanilla.

Measured by weight, vanilla is the world's second-most expensive spice after saffron, because growing the vanilla seed pods is labor-intensive. Nevertheless, vanilla is widely used in both commercial and domestic baking, perfume production, and aromatherapy, as only small amounts are needed to impart its signature flavor and aroma.

== History ==
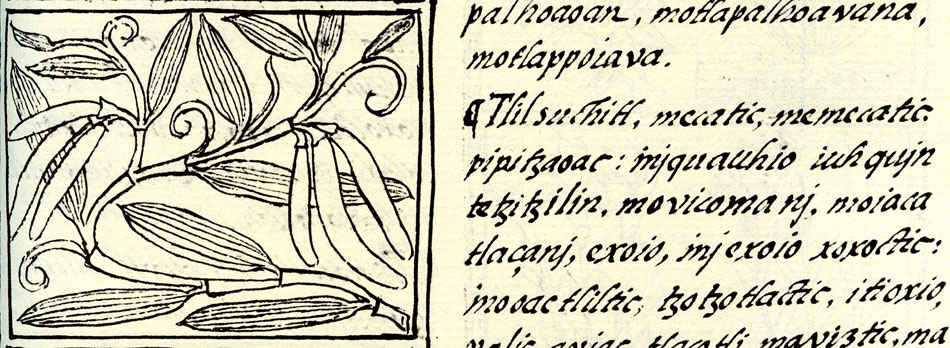
Drawing of the Vanilla plant from the Florentine Codex (c. 1580) and description of its use and properties written in the Nahuatl language

Before domestication, Vanilla planifolia grew wild around the Gulf of Mexico from Tampico around to the northeast tip of South America, and from Colima to Ecuador on the Pacific side, as well as throughout the Caribbean. The Totonac people, who live along the eastern coast of Mexico in the present-day state of Veracruz, were among the first people to domesticate vanilla, cultivated on farms since at least 1185. The Totonac used vanilla as a fragrance in temples and as a good-luck charm in amulets, as well as flavoring for food and beverages. The cultivation of vanilla was a low-profile affair, as few people from outside these regions knew of it. Although the Totonacs are the most famously associated with human use of vanilla, it is speculated that the Olmecs, who also lived in the regions of wild vanilla growth thousands of years earlier, were one of the first peoples to use wild vanilla in cuisine.

Aztecs from the central highlands of Mexico invaded the Totonacs in 1427, developed a taste for the vanilla pods, and began using vanilla to flavor their foods and drinks, often mixing it with cocoa in a drink called "xocolatl" that later inspired modern hot chocolate. The fruit was named tlilxochitl, wrongly interpreted as "black flower" instead of the more probable "black pod" because the matured fruit shrivels and turns a dark color shortly after being picked. For the Aztecs, much like earlier Mesoamerican peoples before them, it is probable that vanilla was used to tame the otherwise bitter taste of cacao, as sugarcane was not harvested in these regions at the time and there were no other sweeteners available.

Hernán Cortés is credited with introducing both vanilla and chocolate to Europe in the 1520s. In Europe, vanilla was seen mostly as an additive to chocolate until the early 17th century when Hugh Morgan, a creative apothecary in the employ of Queen Elizabeth I, created chocolate-free, vanilla-flavored "sweetmeats". By the 18th century, the French were using vanilla to flavor ice cream.

Until the mid-19th century, Mexico was the chief producer of vanilla. One of Mexico's top producing regions was Veracruz, especially in the town of Papantla. By 1889, Mexican exports of vanilla exceeded 70,000 kilograms making the region one of the world leaders in vanilla production at the time. While vanilla trade was surging throughout Papantla, many farmers who owned land on which this commodity was growing would soon be subject to political shifts that led to those farmers having to pay rent. Protests of these shifts in policy led many to fight and die against the four tier hierarchy made up of Totonac caciques, ranchero clans, a hefty class of landowning labradores, and a bulging stratum of tenants, jornaleros, and ranch hands. In 1819, French entrepreneurs shipped vanilla fruits to the islands of Réunion and Mauritius in hopes of producing vanilla there. After 1841, when Edmond Albius discovered how to pollinate the flowers quickly by hand, the pods began to thrive. The noted French botanist and plant collector Jean Michel Claude Richard falsely claimed to have discovered the technique three or four years earlier. By the end of the 20th century, Albius was considered the true discoverer. Soon, the tropical orchids were sent from Réunion to the Comoros Islands, Seychelles, and Madagascar, along with instructions for pollinating them. By 1898, Madagascar, Réunion, and the Comoros Islands produced 200 metric tons of vanilla beans, about 80% of world production in that year. According to the United Nations Food and Agriculture Organization 2019 data, Madagascar, followed by Indonesia, were the largest producers of vanilla in 2018.

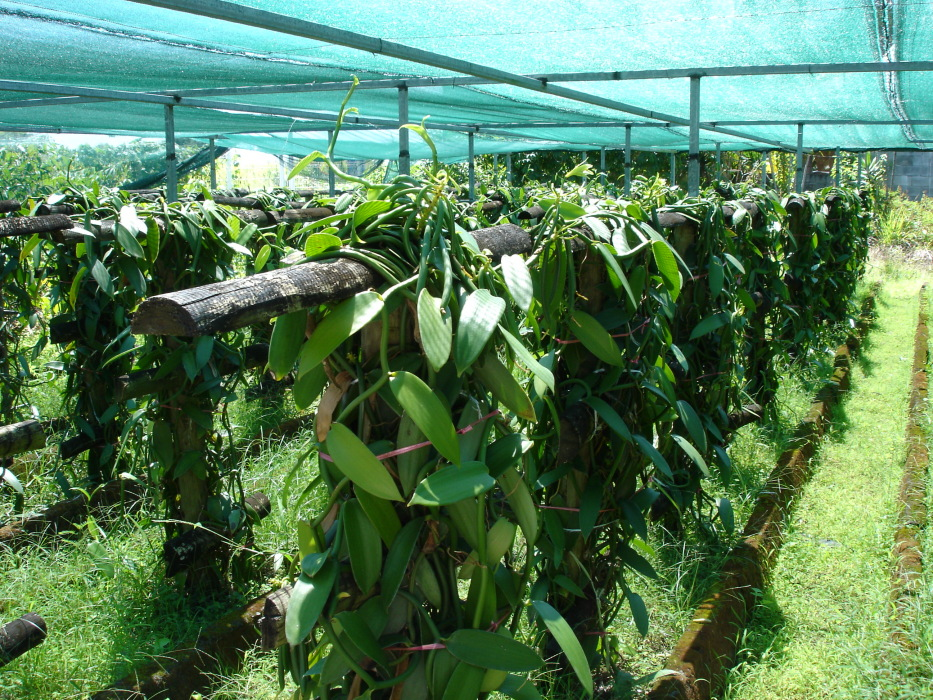
Vanilla cultivation, Réunion

After a tropical cyclone ravaged key croplands, the market price of vanilla rose sharply in the late 1970s and remained high through the early 1980s despite the introduction of Indonesian vanilla. In the mid-1980s, the cartel that had controlled vanilla prices and distribution since its creation in 1930 disbanded. Prices dropped 70% over the next few years, to nearly US$20 per kilogram; prices rose sharply again after tropical cyclone Hudah struck Madagascar in April 2000. The cyclone, political instability, and poor weather in the third year drove vanilla prices to US$500/kg in 2004, bringing new countries into the vanilla industry. A good crop, coupled with decreased demand caused by the production of imitation vanilla, pushed the market price down to the $40/kg range in the middle of 2005. By 2010, prices were down to $20/kg. Cyclone Enawo caused a similar spike to $500/kg in 2017.

An estimated 95% of "vanilla" products are artificially flavored with vanillin derived from lignin instead of vanilla fruit.

Although vanilla was domesticated in Mesoamerica and subsequently spread to the Old World, the use of an unidentified, Old World-endemic Vanilla species is attested in Canaan/Israel during the Middle Bronze Age and later. Traces of vanillin were found in wine jars in Jerusalem, which were used by the Judahite elite before the city was destroyed in 586 BCE.

== Etymology ==
The word vanilla is derived from the Spanish word vainilla meaning "little pod", the diminutive of vaina derived from the Latin vagina (sheath) describing the shape of the pods. The word "vanilla" entered the English language in 1754, when the botanist Philip Miller wrote about the genus in his Gardener's Dictionary.

== Biology ==
=== Vanilla orchid ===
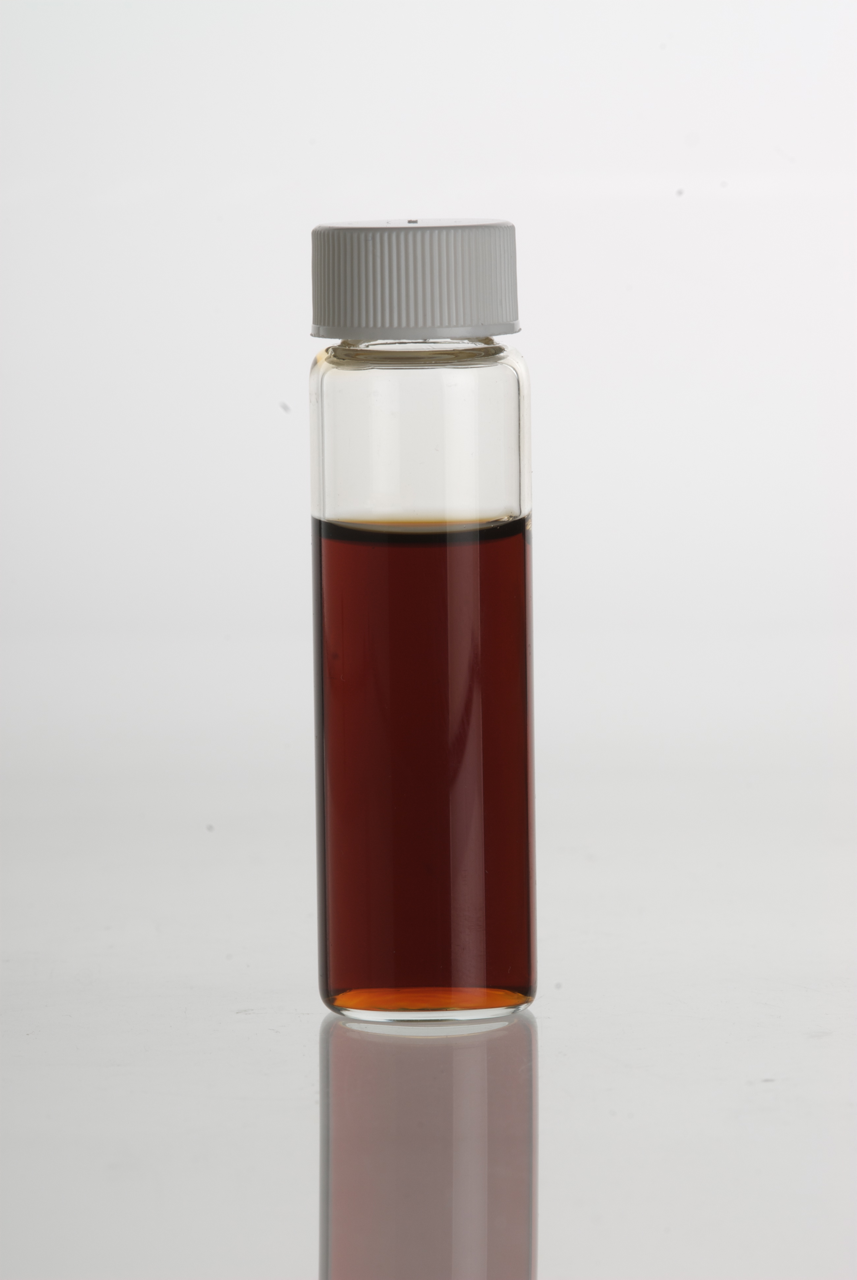
Vanilla extract displays its distinctive color.

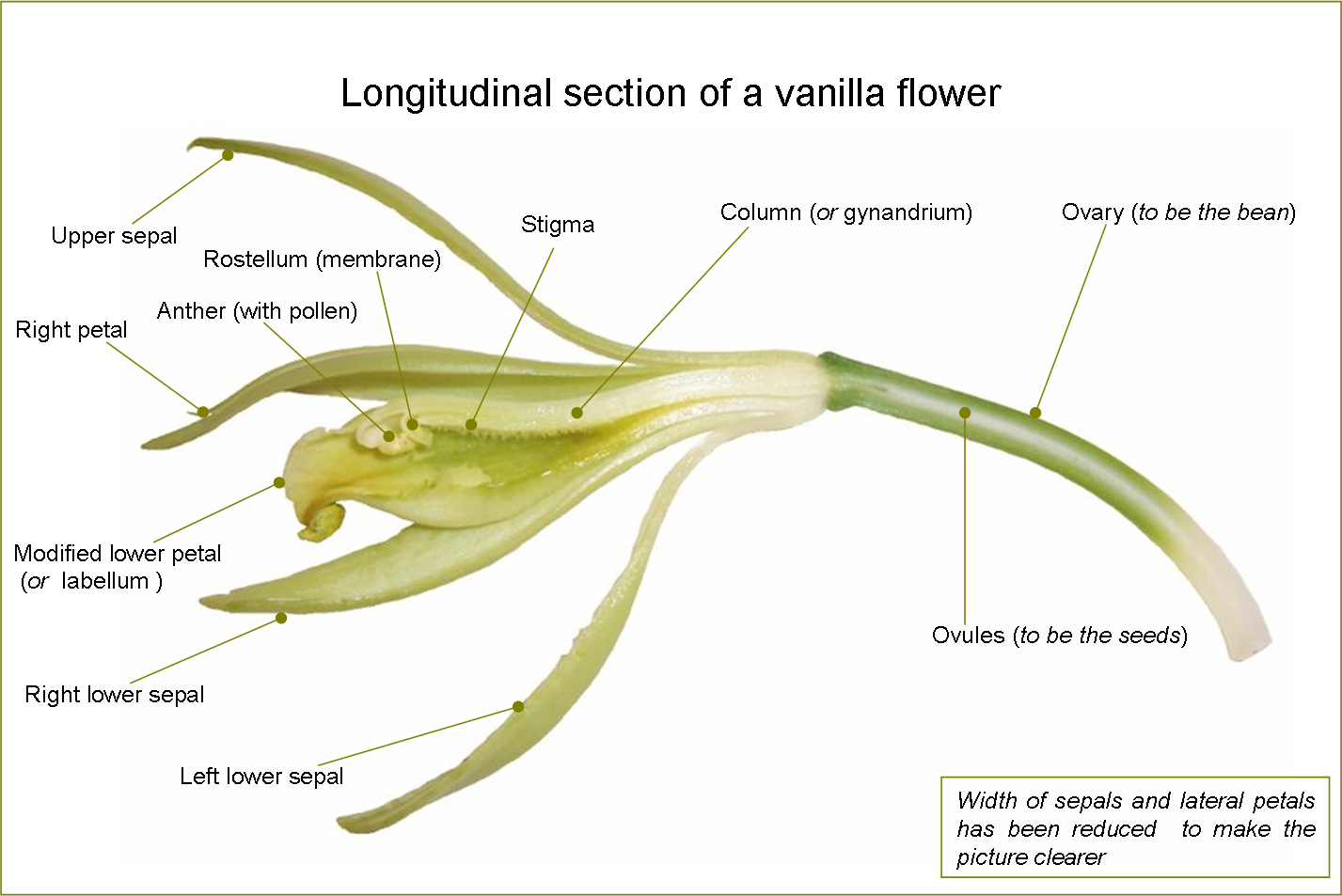
V. planifolia – flower

The main species of vanilla cultivated is V. planifolia. Although it is native to Mesoamerica and South America, it is now widely grown throughout the tropics. Indonesia and Madagascar are the world's largest producers. Additional sources include V. pompona and V. tahitiensis (grown in Niue and Tahiti), although the vanillin content of these species is much less than V. planifolia.

Vanilla grows as a vine, climbing up an existing tree (also called a tutor), pole, or other support. It can be grown in a wood (on trees), in a plantation (on trees or poles), or in a "shader", in increasing orders of productivity. Its growth environment is referred to as its terroir, and includes not only the adjacent plants, but also the climate, geography, and local geology. Left alone, it will grow as high as possible on the support, with few flowers. Every year, growers fold the higher parts of the plant downward so the plant stays at heights accessible by a standing human. This also greatly stimulates flowering.

The distinctively flavored compounds are found in the fruit, which results from the pollination of the flower. These seed pods are roughly one-third of an inch (8.5 mm) by six inches (150 mm), and brownish red to black when ripe. Inside of these pods is an oily liquid full of tiny seeds. One flower produces one fruit. V. planifolia flowers are hermaphroditic: they carry both male (anther) and female (stigma) organs. However, self-pollination is made difficult by the rostellum which separates those organs.

The only pollinators definitively documented to date are orchid bees in the genus Eulaema and the Western honey bee. Hand pollination by humans is the primary method of pollination used for commercial vanilla production worldwide as it has been shown to result in higher pollination rates and greater yields than naturally occurring pollination.

The first vanilla orchid to flower in Europe was in the London collection of the Honourable Charles Greville in 1806. Cuttings from that plant went to Netherlands and Paris, from which the French first transplanted the vines to their overseas colonies. The vines grew, but would not fruit outside Mexico. The only known way to produce fruits is artificial pollination. Today, even in Mexico, hand pollination is used extensively. In 1837, botanist Charles François Antoine Morren began experimenting with hand pollination of Vanilla orchids in cultivation in Europe. The method proved financially unworkable and was not deployed commercially. A few years later in 1841, a simple and efficient artificial hand-pollination method was developed by a 12-year-old slave named Edmond Albius on Réunion, a method still used today. Using a beveled sliver of bamboo, an agricultural worker lifts the membrane separating the anther and the stigma, then, using the thumb, transfers the pollinia from the anther to the stigma. The flower, self-pollinated, will then produce a fruit. The flowers of V. planifolia last about one day, sometimes less, so growers have to inspect their plantations every day for open flowers, a labor-intensive task.

The fruit, a seed capsule, if left on the plant, ripens and opens at the end; as it dries, the phenolic compounds crystallize. It then releases the distinctive vanilla smell.

Like other orchids' seeds, vanilla seeds germinate only in the presence of certain mycorrhizal fungi.

=== Cultivars ===
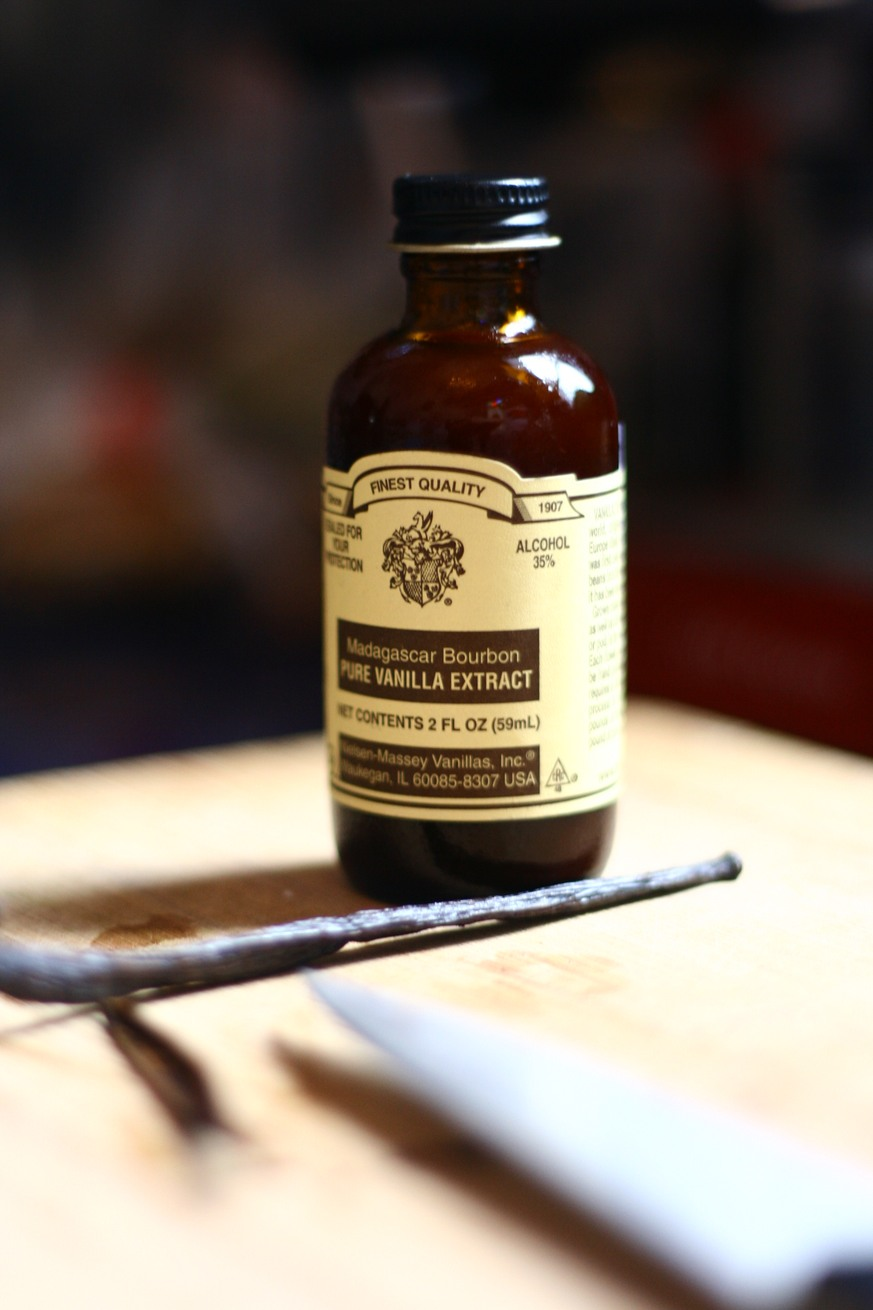
A bottle of vanilla extract

- Bourbon vanilla or Bourbon-Madagascar vanilla, produced from V. planifolia plants introduced from the Americas, is from Indian Ocean islands such as Madagascar, the Comoros, Mauritius and Réunion, formerly named the Île Bourbon. It is also used to describe the distinctive vanilla flavor derived from V. planifolia grown successfully in tropical countries such as India. However, there is no Bourbon whiskey in Bourbon vanilla extract, despite common confusion about this.
- Mexican vanilla, made from the native V. planifolia, is produced in much less quantity and marketed as the vanilla from the land of its origin.
- Tahitian vanilla is from French Polynesia, made with V. tahitensis. Genetic analysis shows this species is possibly a cultivar from a hybrid of V. planifolia and V. odorata. The species was introduced by French Admiral François Alphonse Hamelin to French Polynesia from the Philippines, where it was introduced from Guatemala by the Manila Galleon trade. It comprises less than one percent of vanilla production and is only grown by a handful of skilled growers and preparers.
- West Indian vanilla is made from V. pompona grown in the Caribbean and Central and South America.

The term French vanilla is often used to designate particular preparations with a strong vanilla aroma, containing vanilla grains and sometimes also containing eggs (especially egg yolks). The appellation originates from the French style of making vanilla ice cream with a custard base, using vanilla pods, cream, and egg yolks. Inclusion of vanilla varietals from any of the former French dependencies or overseas France may be a part of the flavoring. Alternatively, French vanilla is taken to refer to a vanilla-custard flavor.

=== Chemistry ===
Chemical structure of vanillin

Vanilla essence occurs in two forms. Real seedpod extract is a complex mixture of several hundred different compounds, including vanillin, acetaldehyde, acetic acid, furfural, hexanoic acid, 4-hydroxybenzaldehyde, eugenol, methyl cinnamate, and isobutyric acid. Synthetic essence consists of a solution of synthetic vanillin in ethanol. The chemical compound vanillin (4-hydroxy-3-methoxybenzaldehyde) is a major contributor to the characteristic flavor and aroma of real vanilla and is the main flavor component of cured vanilla beans.Vanillin was first isolated from vanilla pods by Gobley in 1858. By 1874, it had been obtained from glycosides of pine tree sap, temporarily causing a depression in the natural vanilla industry. Vanillin can be easily synthesized from various raw materials, but the majority of food-grade (> 99% pure) vanillin is made from guaiacol.

== Cultivation ==
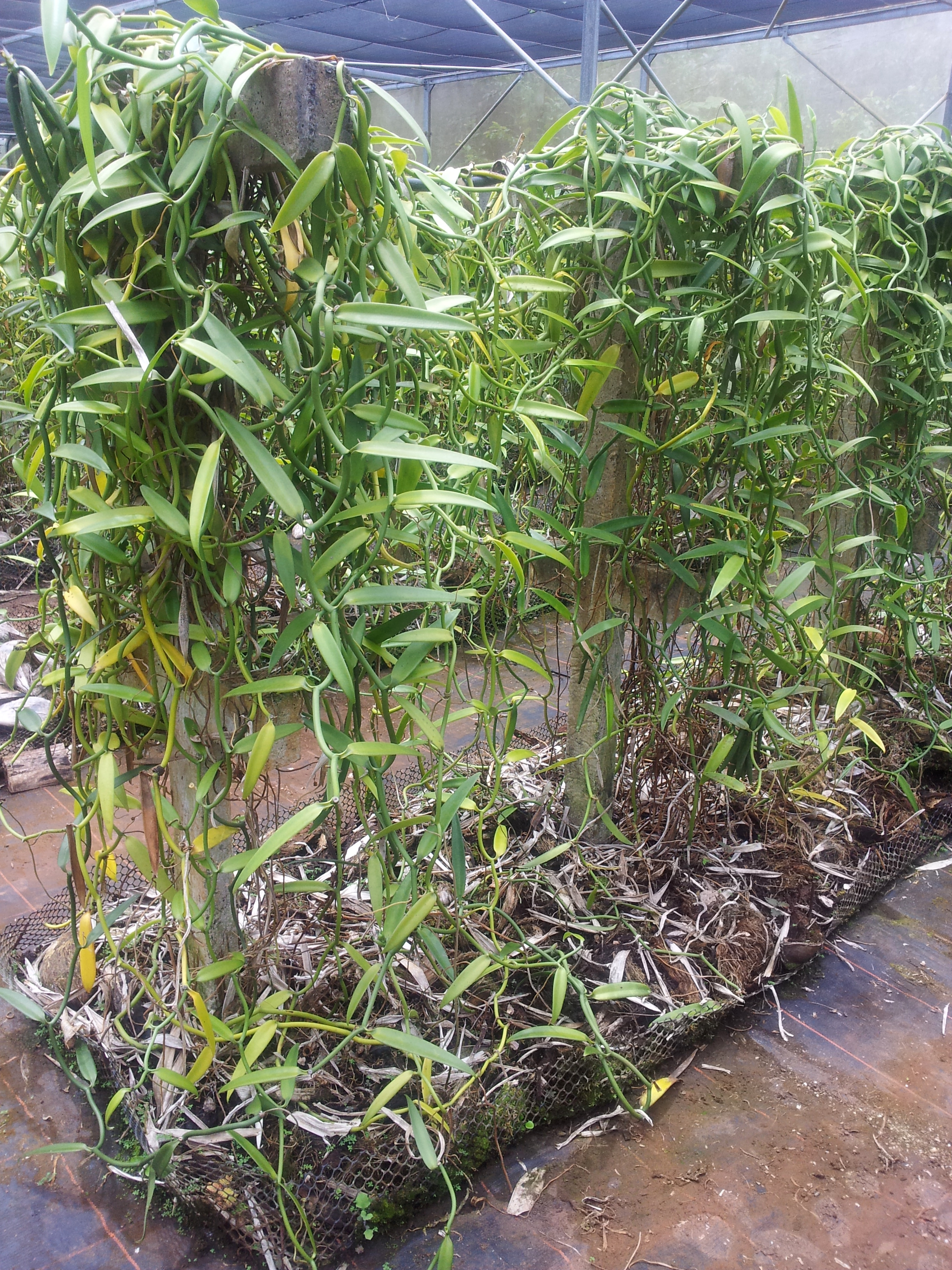
Vanilla × tahitensis in cultivation

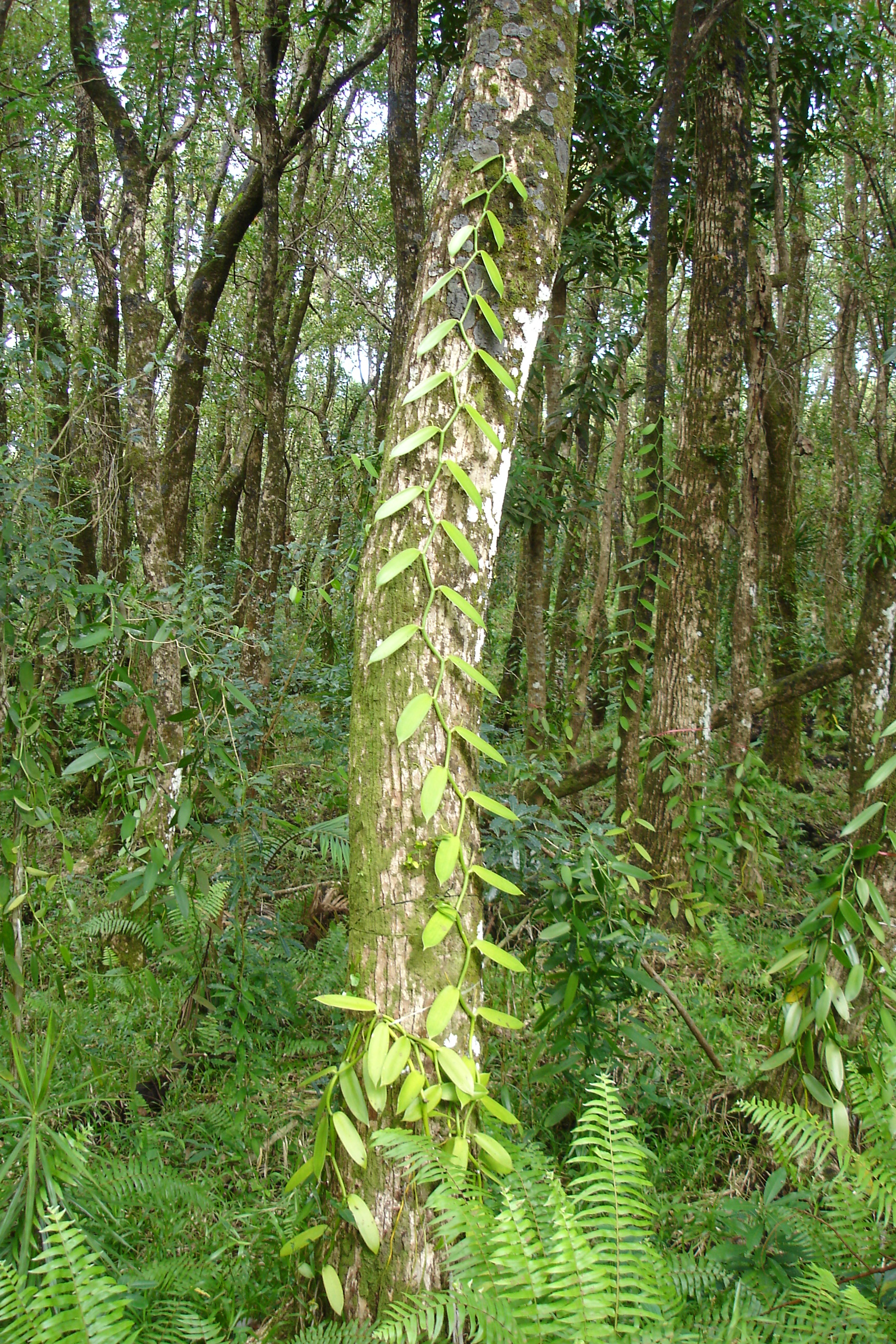
A vanilla plantation in a forest of Réunion Island

In general, quality vanilla only comes from good vines and through careful production methods. Commercial vanilla production can be performed under open field and "greenhouse" operations. The two production systems share these similarities:

- Plant height and number of years before producing the first grains
- Shade necessities
- Amount of organic matter needed
- A tree or frame to grow around (bamboo, coconut or Erythrina lanceolata)
- Labor intensity (pollination and harvest activities)

Vanilla grows best in a hot, humid climate from sea level to an elevation of 1,500 m (4,900 ft). The ideal climate has moderate rainfall, 1,500–3,000 mm (59–118 in), evenly distributed through 10 months of the year. Optimum temperatures for cultivation are 15–30 °C (59–86 °F) during the day and 15–20 °C (59–68 °F) during the night. Ideal humidity is around 80%, and under normal greenhouse conditions, it can be achieved by an evaporative cooler. However, since greenhouse vanilla is grown near the equator and under polymer (HDPE) netting (shading of 50%), this humidity can be achieved by the environment. Most successful vanilla growing and processing is done in the region within 10 to 20° of the equator.

Soils for vanilla cultivation should be loose, with high organic matter content and loamy texture. They must be well drained, and a slight slope helps in this condition. Soil pH has not been well documented, but some researchers have indicated an optimum soil pH around 5.3. Mulch is very important for proper growth of the vine, and a considerable portion of mulch should be placed in the base of the vine. Fertilization varies with soil conditions, but general recommendations are: 40 to 60 g of N, 20 to 30 g of P_{2}O_{5} and 60 to 100 g of K_{2}O should be applied to each plant per year besides organic manures, such as vermicompost, oil cakes, poultry manure, and wood ash. Foliar applications are also good for vanilla, and a solution of 1% NPK (17:17:17) can be sprayed on the plant once a month. Vanilla requires organic matter, so three or four applications of mulch a year are adequate for the plant.

=== Propagation, preparation and type of stock ===
Dissemination of vanilla can be achieved either by stem cutting or by tissue culture. For stem cutting, a progeny garden needs to be established. All plants need to grow under 50% shade, as well as the rest of the crop. Mulching the trenches with coconut husk and micro irrigation provide an ideal microclimate for vegetative growth. Cuttings between 60 and 120 cm (24 and 47 in) should be selected for planting in the field or greenhouse. Cuttings below 60 to 120 cm (24 to 47 in) need to be rooted and raised in a separate nursery before planting. Planting material should always come from unflowered portions of the vine. Wilting of the cuttings before planting provides better conditions for root initiation and establishment.

Before planting the cuttings, trees to support the vine must be planted at least three months before sowing the cuttings. Pits of 30 × 30 × 30 cm are dug 30 cm (12 in) away from the tree and filled with farm yard manure (vermicompost), sand and top soil mixed well. An average of 2000 cuttings can be planted per hectare (2.5 acres). One important consideration is that when planting the cuttings from the base, four leaves should be pruned and the pruned basal point must be pressed into the soil in a way such that the nodes are in close contact with the soil, and are placed at a depth of 15 to 20 cm (5.9 to 7.9 in). The top portion of the cutting is tied to the tree using natural fibers such as banana or hemp.

=== Tissue culture ===
Tissue culture was first used as a means of creating vanilla plants during the 1980s at Tamil Nadu University. This was the part of the first project to grow V. planifolia in India. At that time, a shortage of vanilla planting stock was occurring in India. The approach was inspired by the work going on to tissue culture other flowering plants. Several methods have been proposed for vanilla tissue culture, but all of them begin from axillary buds of the vanilla vine. In vitro multiplication has also been achieved through culture of callus masses, protocorms, root tips and stem nodes. Description of any of these processes can be obtained from the references listed before, but all of them are successful in generation of new vanilla plants that first need to be grown up to a height of at least 30 cm (12 in) before they can be planted in the field or greenhouse.

=== Scheduling considerations ===
In the tropics, the ideal time for planting vanilla is from September to November, when the weather is neither too rainy nor too dry, but this recommendation varies with growing conditions. Cuttings take one to eight weeks to establish roots, and show initial signs of growth from one of the leaf axils. A thick mulch of leaves should be provided immediately after planting as an additional source of organic matter. Three years are required for cuttings to grow enough to produce flowers and subsequent pods. As with most orchids, the blossoms grow along stems branching from the main vine. The buds, growing along the 6 to 10 in (15 to 25 cm) stems, bloom and mature in sequence, each at a different interval.

=== Pollination ===
External videos
- Hand Pollination of Vanilla Planifolia Flowers, YouTube video

Flowering normally occurs every spring, and without pollination, the blossom wilts and falls, and no vanilla bean can grow. In the wild in the New World, the only organisms ever observed to carry Vanilla pollen are orchid bees in the genus Eulaema, though direct evidence documenting seed set is lacking. Claims that pollination is achieved by stingless bees of the genus Melipona or hummingbirds have never been substantiated, though they do visit the flowers. Even within the range of orchid bees, wild vanilla orchids have only a 1% chance of successful pollination. As a result, all vanilla grown today is pollinated by hand. Each flower must be hand-pollinated within 12 hours of opening. A small splinter of wood or a grass stem is used to lift the rostellum or move the flap upward, so the overhanging anther can be pressed against the stigma and self-pollinate the vine. Generally, one flower per raceme opens per day, so the raceme may be in flower for over 20 days. A healthy vine should produce about 50 to 100 beans per year, but growers are careful to pollinate only five or six flowers from the 20 on each raceme. The first flowers that open in each raceme are usually the only ones that are pollinated, so the resulting beans are similar in age and mature together. This agronomic practice facilitates harvest and increases bean quality, as over-pollination results in diseases and inferior bean quality. The fruits require five to six weeks to develop, but around six months to mature. A vine remains productive between 12 and 14 years.

=== Pest and disease management ===
Vanilla is susceptible to many fungal and viral diseases. Fusarium, Sclerotium, Phytophthora, and Colletrotrichum species cause rots of root, stem, leaf, bean, and shoot apex. Development of most diseases is favoured by unsuitable growing conditions such as overwatering, insufficient drainage, heavy mulch, overpollination, and too much shade. Fungal diseases can be controlled by spraying Bordeaux mixture (1%), carbendazim (0.2%) and copper oxychloride (0.2%).

Biological control of the spread of such diseases can be managed by applying to the soil Trichoderma (0.5 kg (1.1 lb) per plant in the rhizosphere) and foliar application of pseudomonas (0.2%). Mosaic virus, leaf curl, and cymbidium mosaic potexvirus are the common viral diseases. These diseases are transmitted through the sap, so affected plants must be destroyed. The insect pests of vanilla include beetles and weevils that attack the flower, caterpillars, snakes, and slugs that damage the tender parts of shoot, flower buds, and immature fruit, and grasshoppers that affect cutting shoot tips. If organic agriculture is practiced, insecticides are avoided, and mechanical measures are adopted for pest management. Most of these practices are implemented under greenhouse cultivation, since such field conditions are very difficult to achieve.

=== Artificial vanilla ===
Most artificial vanilla products contain vanillin, which can be produced synthetically from lignin, a natural polymer found in wood. Most synthetic vanillin is a byproduct from the pulp used in papermaking, in which the lignin is broken down using sulfites or sulfates. However, vanillin is only one of 171 identified aromatic components of real vanilla fruits.

The orchid species Leptotes bicolor is used as a natural vanilla replacement in Paraguay and southern Brazil.

In 1996 the US Food and Drug Administration cautioned that some vanilla products sold in Mexico were made from the cheaper tonka bean which as well as vanillin also contains the toxin coumarin. They advised consumers to always check the ingredients label and avoid suspiciously cheap products.

=== Nonplant vanilla flavoring ===
In the United States, castoreum, the exudate from the castor sacs of mature beavers, has been approved by the Food and Drug Administration as a food additive, often referenced simply as a "natural flavoring" in the product's list of ingredients. It is used in both food and beverages, especially as vanilla and raspberry flavoring, with a total annual US production of less than 300 pounds (140 kg). It is also used to flavor some cigarettes and in perfume-making, and is used by fur trappers as a scent lure.

=== Harvest ===
Harvesting vanilla fruits is as labor-intensive as pollinating the blossoms. Immature, dark green pods are not harvested. Pale yellow discoloration that commences at the distal end of the fruits is not a good indication of the maturity of pods. Each fruit ripens at its own time, requiring a daily harvest. "Current methods for determining the maturity of vanilla (Vanilla planifolia Andrews) beans are unreliable. Yellowing at the blossom end, the current index, occurs before beans accumulate maximum glucovanillin concentrations. Beans left on the vine until they turn brown have higher glucovanillin concentrations but may split and have low quality. Judging bean maturity is difficult as they reach full size soon after pollination. Glucovanillin accumulates from 20 weeks, maximum about 40 weeks after pollination. Mature green beans have 20% dry matter but less than 2% glucovanillin." The accumulation of dry matter and glucovanillin are highly correlated. To ensure the finest flavor from every fruit, each individual pod must be picked by hand just as it begins to split on the end. Overmatured fruits are likely to split, causing a reduction in market value. Its commercial value is fixed based on the length and appearance of the pod.

If the fruit is more than 15 cm (5.9 in) in length, it is categorized as first-quality. The largest fruits greater than 16 cm (6.3 in) and up to as much as 21 cm (8.3 in) are usually reserved for the gourmet vanilla market, for sale to top chefs and restaurants. If the fruits are between 10 and 15 cm long, pods are in the second-quality category, and fruits less than 10 cm (3.9 in) in length are in the third-quality category. Each fruit contains thousands of tiny black vanilla seeds. Vanilla fruit yield depends on the care and management given to the hanging and fruiting vines. Any practice directed to stimulate aerial root production has a direct effect on vine productivity. A five-year-old vine can produce between 1.5 and 3 kg (3.3 and 6.6 lb) of pods, and this production can increase up to 6 kg (13 lb) after a few years. The harvested green fruit can be commercialized as such or cured to get a better market price.

=== Curing ===
Several methods exist in the market for curing vanilla; nevertheless, all of them consist of four basic steps: killing, sweating, slow-drying, and conditioning of the beans.

==== Killing ====
The vegetative tissue of the vanilla pod is killed to stop the vegetative growth of the pods and disrupt the cells and tissue of the fruits, which initiates enzymatic reactions responsible for the aroma. The method of killing varies, but may be accomplished by heating in hot water, freezing, or scratching, or killing by heating in an oven or exposing the beans to direct sunlight. The different methods give different profiles of enzymatic activity.

Testing has shown mechanical disruption of fruit tissues can cause curing processes, including the degeneration of glucovanillin to vanillin, so the reasoning goes that disrupting the tissues and cells of the fruit allow enzymes and enzyme substrates to interact.

Hot-water killing may consist of dipping the pods in hot water (63–65 °C (145–149 °F)) for three minutes, or at 80 °C (176 °F) for 10 seconds. In scratch killing, fruits are scratched along their length. Frozen or quick-frozen fruits must be thawed again for the subsequent sweating stage. Tied in bundles and rolled in blankets, fruits may be placed in an oven at 60 °C (140 °F) for 36 to 48 hours. Exposing the fruits to sunlight until they turn brown, a method originating in Mexico, was practiced by the Aztecs.

==== Sweating ====
Sweating is a hydrolytic and oxidative process. Traditionally, it consists of keeping fruits, for 7 to 10 days, densely stacked and insulated in wool or other cloth. This retains a temperature of 45–65 °C (113–149 °F) and high humidity. Daily exposure to the sun may also be used, or dipping the fruits in hot water. The fruits are brown and have attained much of the characteristic vanilla flavor and aroma by the end of this process, but still retain a 60–70% moisture content by weight.

==== Drying ====
Reduction of the beans to 25–30% moisture by weight, to prevent rotting and to lock the aroma in the pods, is always achieved by some exposure of the beans to air, and usually (and traditionally) intermittent shade and sunlight. Fruits may be laid out in the sun during the mornings and returned to their boxes in the afternoons, or spread on a wooden rack in a room for three to four weeks, sometimes with periods of sun exposure. Drying is the most problematic of the curing stages; unevenness in the drying process can lead to the loss of vanillin content of some fruits by the time the others are cured.

==== Conditioning ====
Conditioning is performed by storing the pods for five to six months in closed boxes, where the fragrance develops. The processed fruits are sorted, graded, bundled, and wrapped in paraffin paper and preserved for the development of desired bean qualities, especially flavor and aroma. The cured vanilla fruits contain an average of 2.5% vanillin.

=== Grading ===
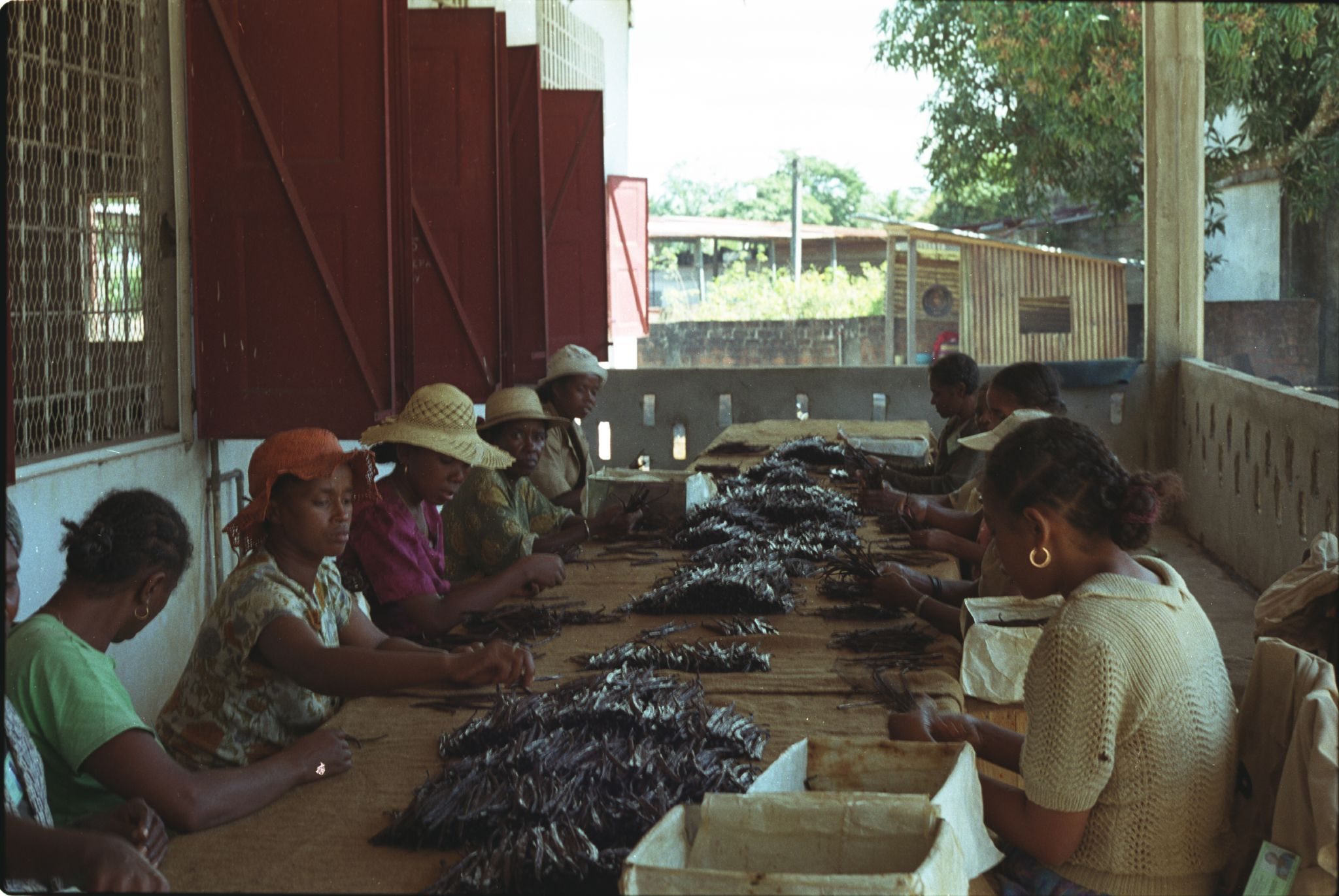
Grading vanilla beans at Sambava, Madagascar

Once fully cured, the vanilla fruits are sorted by quality and graded. Several vanilla fruit grading systems are in use. Each country which produces vanilla has its own grading system, and individual vendors, in turn, sometimes use their own criteria for describing the quality of the fruits they offer for sale. In general, vanilla fruit grade is based on the length, appearance (color, sheen, presence of any splits, presence of blemishes), and moisture content of the fruit. Whole, dark, plump and oily pods that are visually attractive, with no blemishes, and that have a higher moisture content are graded most highly. Such pods are particularly prized by chefs for their appearance and can be featured in gourmet dishes. Beans that show localized signs of disease or other physical defects are cut to remove the blemishes; the shorter fragments left are called "cuts" and are assigned lower grades, as are fruits with lower moisture contents. Lower-grade fruits tend to be favored for uses in which the appearance is not as important, such as in the production of vanilla flavoring extract and in the fragrance industry.

Higher-grade fruits command higher prices in the market. However, because grade is so dependent on visual appearance and moisture content, fruits with the highest grade do not necessarily contain the highest concentration of characteristic flavor molecules such as vanillin, and are not necessarily the most flavorful.

Example of a vanilla fruit grading system, used in Madagascar
Grade	Color	Appearance / feel	Approximate moisture content†
Black	dark brown to black	supple with oily luster	> 30%
TK (Brown, or Semi-Black)	dark brown to black sometimes with a few red streaks	like Black but drier/stiffer	25–30%
Red Fox (European quality)	brown with reddish variegation	a few blemishes	25%
Red American quality	brown with reddish variegation	similar to European red but more blemishes and drier/stiffer	22–25%
Cuts	short, cut, and often split fruits, typically with substandard aroma and color		

† moisture content varies among sources cited

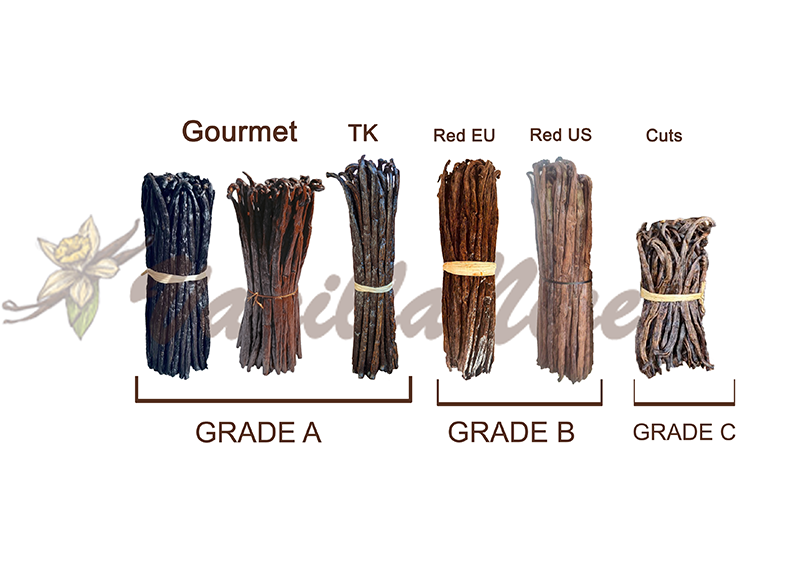
Vanilla-grading in Madagascar

A simplified, alternative grading system has been proposed for classifying vanilla fruits suitable for use in cooking:

Simplified vanilla fruit grading system for cooks
Grade A / Grade I	15 cm and longer, 100–120 fruits per pound	Also called "Gourmet" or "Prime". 30–35% moisture content.
Grade B / Grade II	10–15 cm, 140–160 fruits per pound	Also called "Extract fruits". 15–25% moisture content.
Grade C / Grade III	10 cm	

Under this scheme, vanilla extract is normally made from Grade B fruits.

Vanilla production 2023, tonnes
Madagascar	3,113
Indonesia	1,833
Mexico	508
Papua New Guinea	491
China	434
World	7,433
Source: FAOSTAT of the United Nations

== Production ==
In 2023, world production of raw vanilla was 7,433 tonnes, led by Madagascar with 42% of the total and Indonesia with 25% (table).

== Uses ==
A vanilla powder preparation made from sucrose and vanilla bean extracts

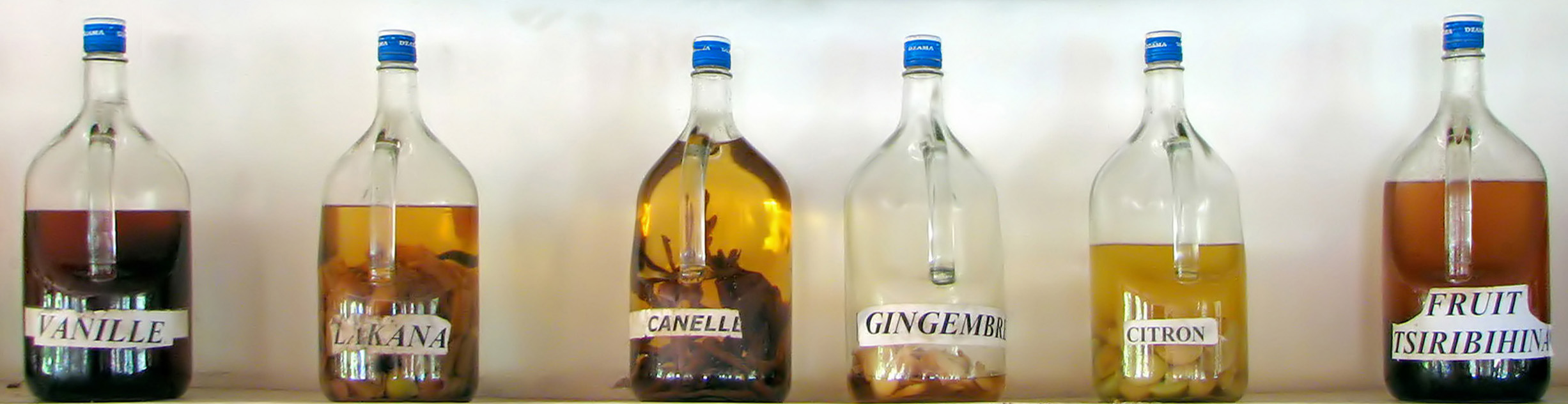
Vanilla rum, Madagascar

The four main commercial preparations of natural vanilla are:

- Whole pod
- Powder (ground pods, kept pure or blended with sugar, starch, or other ingredients)
- Extract (in alcoholic or occasionally glycerol solution; both pure and imitation forms of vanilla contain at least 35% alcohol)
- Vanilla sugar, a packaged mix of sugar and vanilla extract

Vanilla flavoring in food may be achieved by adding vanilla extract or by cooking vanilla pods in the liquid preparation. A stronger aroma may be attained if the pods are split in two, exposing more of a pod's surface area to the liquid. In this case, the pods' seeds are mixed into the preparation. Natural vanilla gives a brown or yellow color to preparations, depending on the concentration. Good-quality vanilla has a strong, aromatic flavor, but food with small amounts of low-quality vanilla or artificial vanilla-like flavorings are far more common, since true vanilla is much more expensive.

Regarded as the world's most popular aroma and flavor, vanilla is a widely used aroma and flavor compound for foods, beverages and cosmetics, as indicated by its popularity as an ice cream flavor (as of 2004, around half of vanilla flavor consumed in the US was eaten in ice cream). Although vanilla is a prized flavoring agent on its own, it is also used to enhance the flavor of other substances, to which its own flavor is often complementary, such as chocolate, custard, caramel, coffee, and others. Vanilla is a common ingredient in Western sweet baked goods, such as cookies and cakes. Despite the expense, vanilla is highly valued for its flavor.

The food industry uses methyl and ethyl vanillin as less-expensive substitutes for real vanilla. Ethyl vanillin is more expensive, but has a stronger note. Cook's Illustrated ran several taste tests pitting vanilla against vanillin in baked goods and other applications, and to the consternation of the magazine editors, tasters could not differentiate the flavor of vanillin from vanilla; however, for the case of vanilla ice cream, natural vanilla won out. A more recent and thorough test by the same group produced a more interesting variety of results; namely, high-quality artificial vanilla flavoring is best for cookies, while high-quality real vanilla is slightly better for cakes and significantly better for unheated or lightly heated foods.

The liquid extracted from vanilla pods was once believed to have medical properties, helping with various stomach ailments.

== Contact dermatitis ==
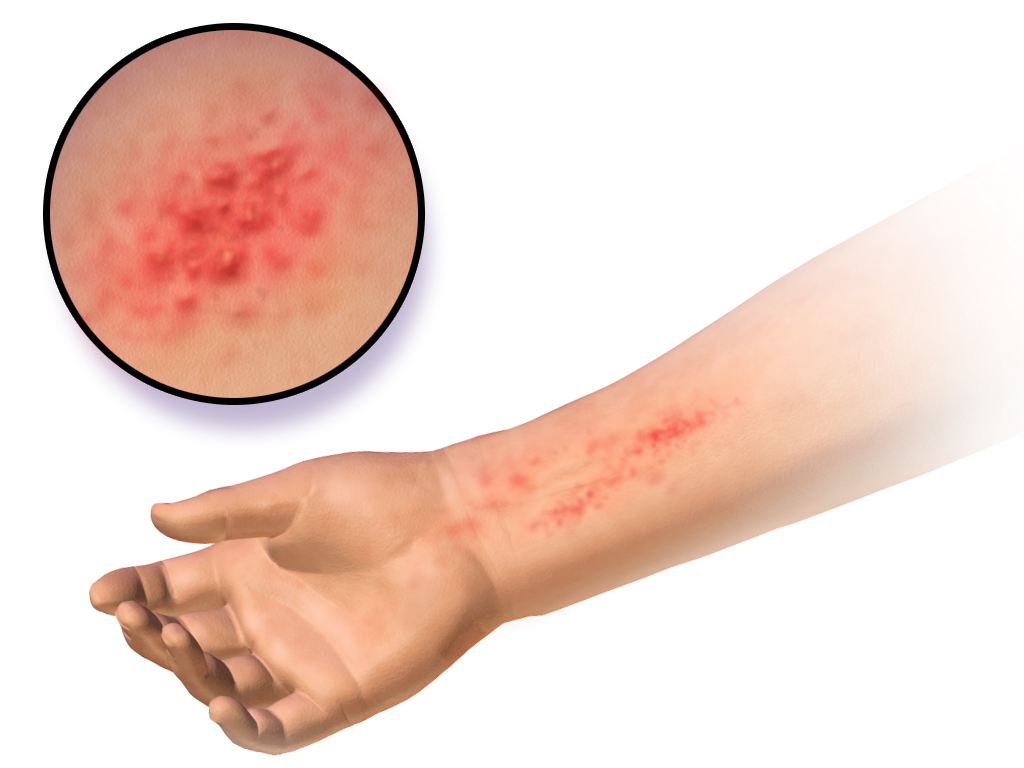
Illustration of allergic contact dermatitis

The sap of most species of vanilla orchid which exudes from cut stems or where beans are harvested can cause moderate to severe dermatitis if it comes in contact with bare skin. The sap of vanilla orchids contains calcium oxalate crystals, which are thought to be the main causative agent of contact dermatitis in vanilla plantation workers.

== Gallery ==
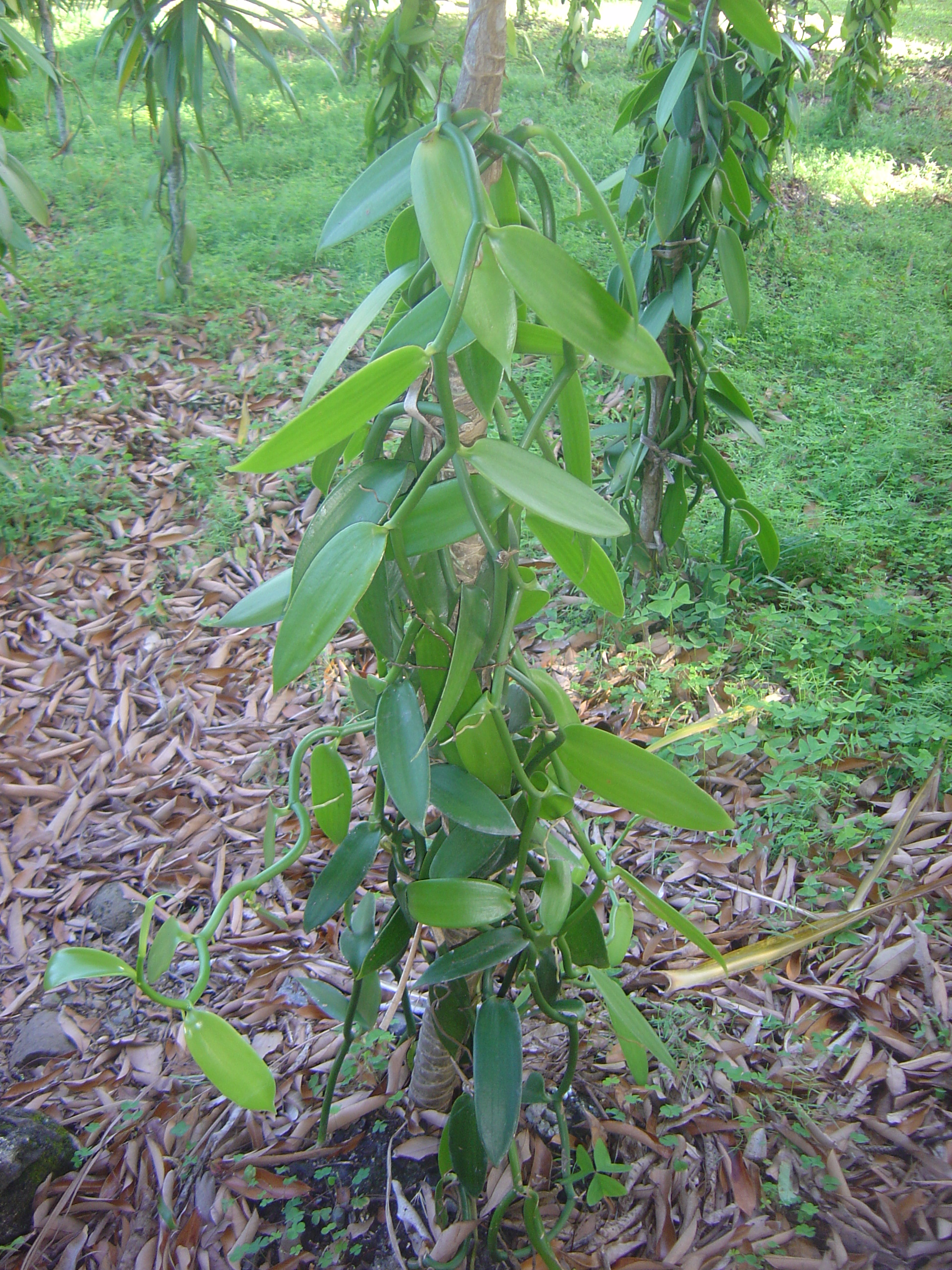
A vanilla planting in an open field on Réunion

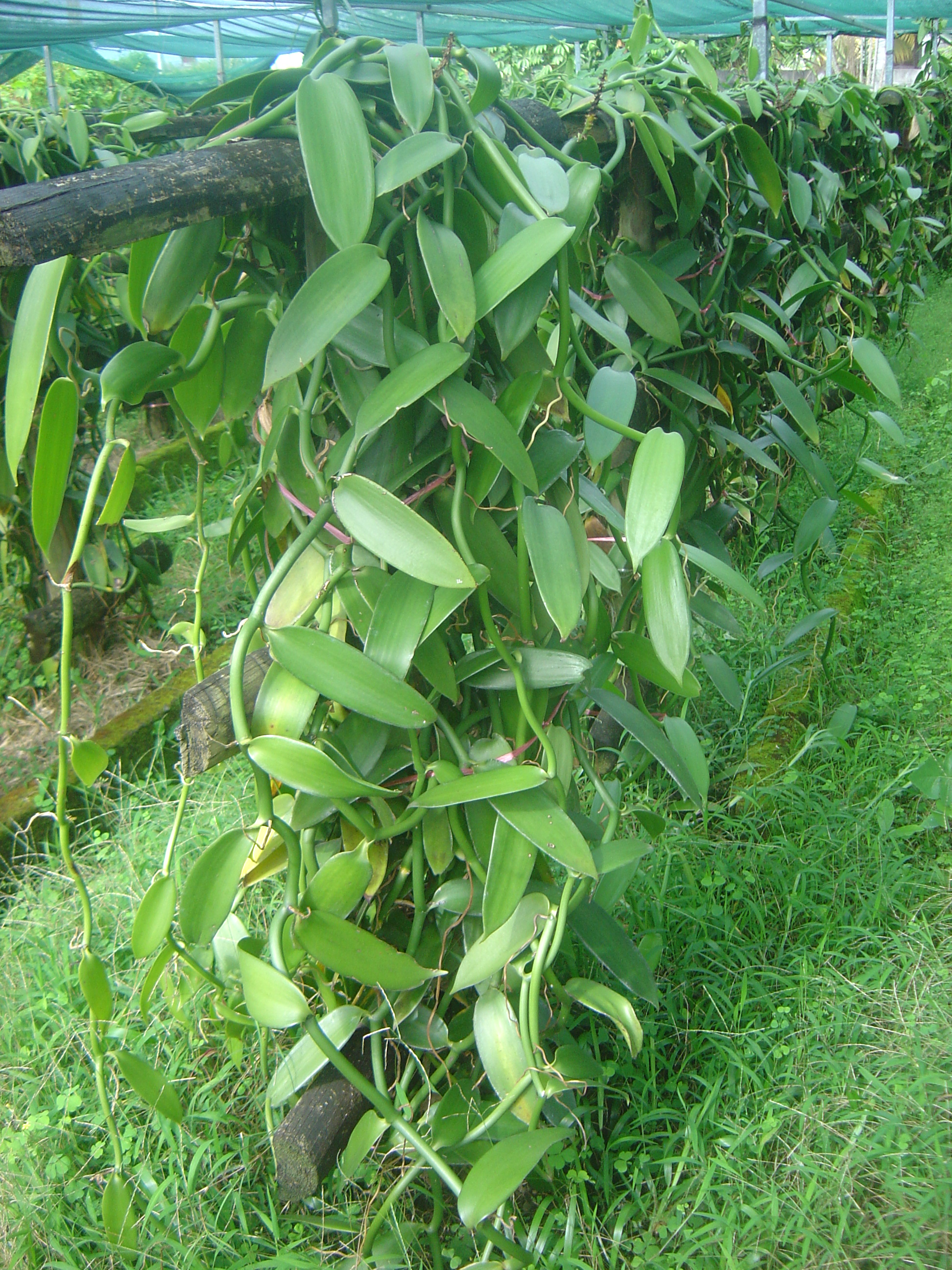
A vanilla planting in a "shader" (ombrière) on Réunion

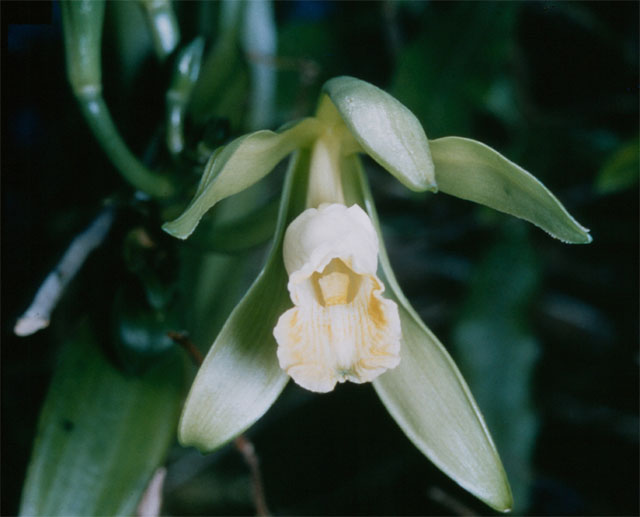
Flower

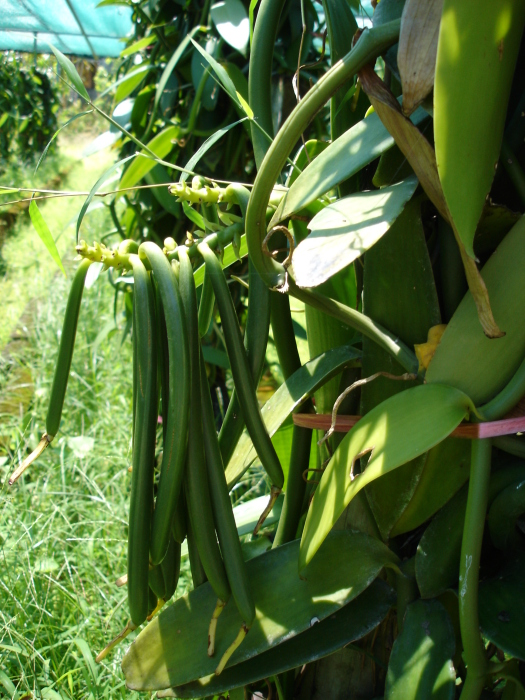
Green fruits

== See also ==
- Vanilla extract
