= Reimer–Tiemann reaction =

Chemical reaction for ortho-formylation of phenols

Reimer–Tiemann reaction also known as RT reaction
Named after	Karl Reimer; Ferdinand Tiemann
Reaction type	Substitution reaction

Identifiers
RSC ontology ID	RXNO:0000072

The Reimer–Tiemann reaction is a chemical reaction used for the ortho-formylation of phenols. with the simplest example being the conversion of phenol to salicylaldehyde. The reaction was first reported by Karl Reimer and Ferdinand Tiemann.

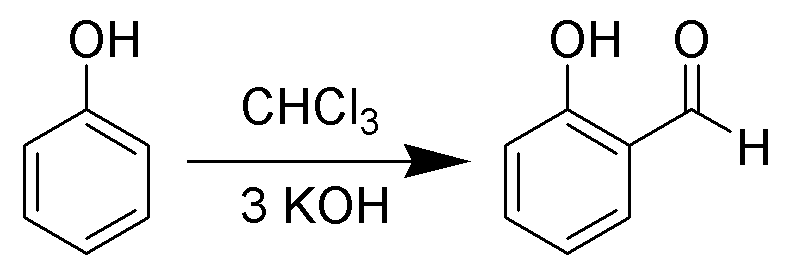
The Reimer-Tiemann reaction

== Reaction mechanism ==
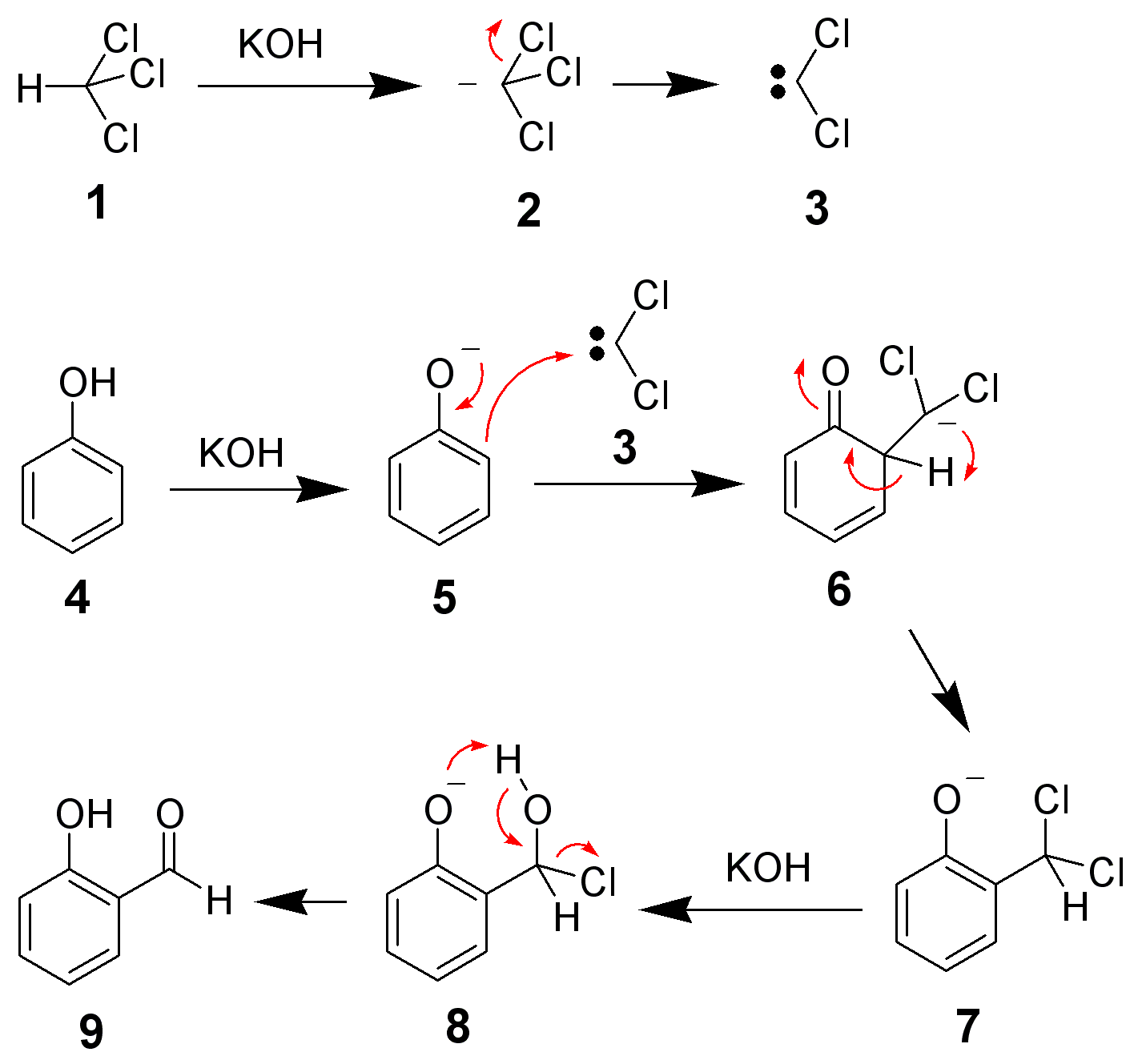
The mechanism of the Reimer-Tiemann reaction

Chloroform (1) is deprotonated by a strong base (normally hydroxide) to form the chloroform carbanion (2) which will quickly does alpha-elimination to give dichlorocarbene (3); this is the principal reactive species. The hydroxide will also deprotonate the phenol (4) to give a negatively charged phenoxide (5). The negative charge is delocalised into the aromatic ring, making it far more nucleophilic. Nucleophilic attack on the dichlorocarbene gives an intermediate dichloromethyl substituted phenol (7). After basic hydrolysis, the desired product (9) is formed.

=== Selectivity ===
By virtue of its two electron-withdrawing chlorine groups, the carbene (3) is highly electron deficient and is attracted to the electron rich phenoxide (5). This interaction favors selective ortho-formylation, consistent with other electrophilic aromatic substitution reactions.

== Reaction conditions ==
Hydroxides are not readily soluble in chloroform, thus the reaction is generally carried out in a biphasic solvent system. In the simplest sense this consists of an aqueous hydroxide solution and an organic phase containing the chloroform. Therefore, the two reagents are separated and must be brought together for the reaction to take place. This can be achieved by rapid mixing, phase-transfer catalysts, or an emulsifying agent such as 1,4-dioxane as solvent.

The reaction typically needs to be heated to initiate the process; however, once started, the Reimer–Tiemann Reaction can be highly exothermic. This combination of properties makes it prone to thermal runaways.

== Scope ==
The Reimer–Tiemann reaction is effective for other hydroxy-aromatic compounds, such as naphthols. Electron rich heterocycles such as pyrroles and indoles are also known to react.

Dichlorocarbenes can react with alkenes and amines to form dichlorocyclopropanes and isocyanides respectively. As such the Reimer–Tiemann reaction may be unsuitable for substrates bearing these functional groups. In addition, many compounds can not withstand being heated with hydroxide.

== Comparison to other methods ==
The direct formylation of aromatic compounds can be accomplished by various methods such as the Gattermann reaction, Gattermann–Koch reaction, Vilsmeier–Haack reaction, or Duff reaction; however, in terms of ease and safety of operations, the Reimer–Tiemann reaction is often the most advantageous route chosen in chemical synthesis. Of the reactions mentioned before, the Reimer–Tiemann reaction is the only route not requiring acidic and/or anhydrous conditions. Additionally the Gattermann—Koch reaction is not applicable to phenol substrates.

== Variations ==
Using carbon tetrachloride instead of chloroform gives a carboxylic acid product instead of an aldehyde. For example, this reaction variant with phenol would yield salicylic acid.

== Historical references ==
Reimer and Tiemann published several papers on the subject. The early work has been reviewed.
