= Ferdinand Tiemann =

German chemist (1848–1899)

Johann Karl Wilhelm Ferdinand Tiemann
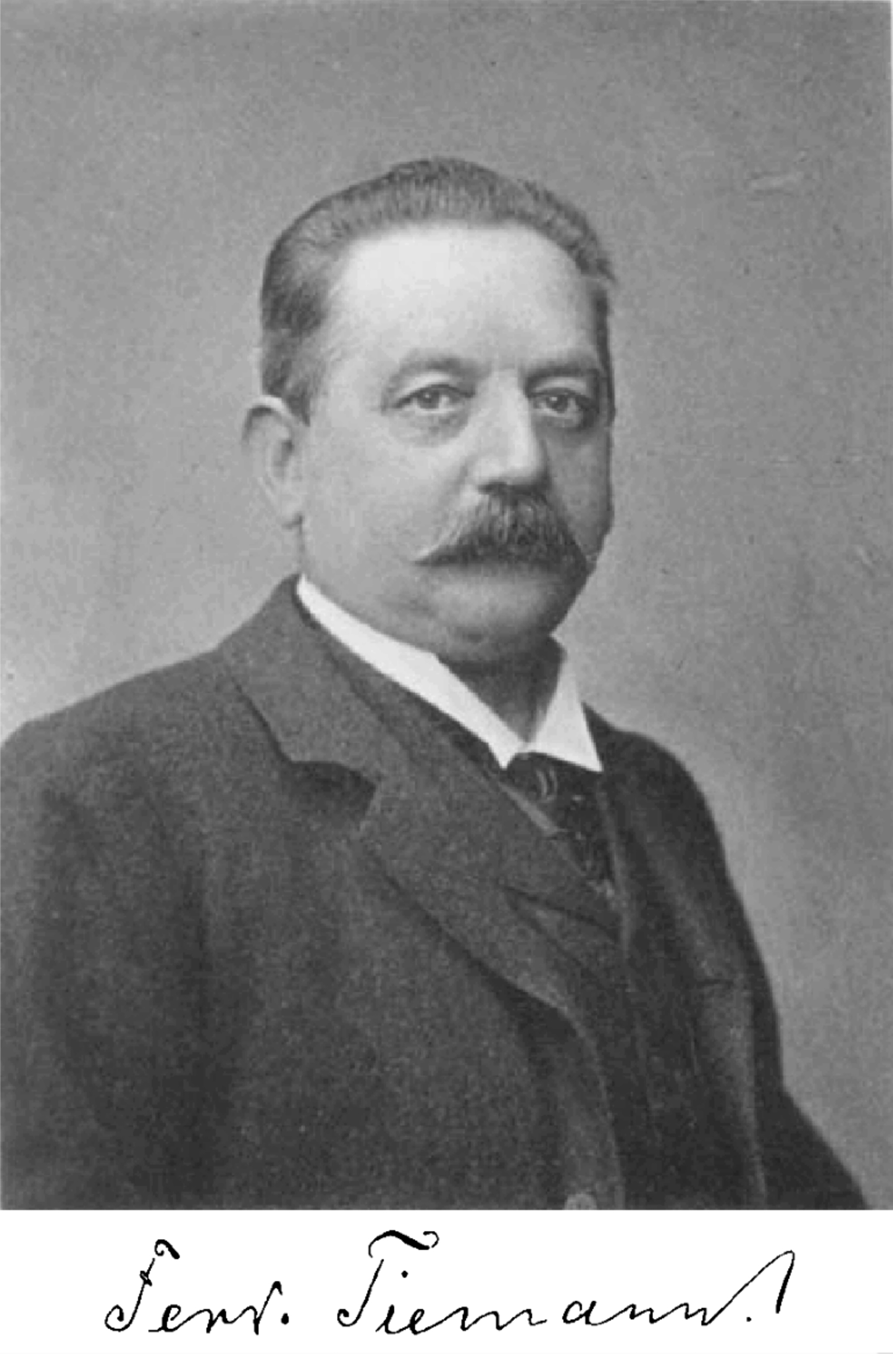
- Ferdinand Tiemann c. 1880 in Berlin
- Born: June 10, 1848; Rübeland (now part of Elbingerode), Kingdom of Hanover
- Died: November 14, 1899 (aged 51); Meran, Austria-Hungary
- Education: TU Braunschweig
- Known for: Tiemann rearrangement Reimer-Tiemann reaction
- Awards: Cothenius Medal (1976)
- Scientific career
- Workplaces: University of Berlin
- Doctoral advisor: August Wilhelm von Hofmann
- Doctoral students: Julius Stieglitz, Carl Harries

Johann Karl Wilhelm Ferdinand Tiemann (June 10, 1848 – November 14, 1899) was a German chemist and together with Karl Reimer discoverer of the Reimer-Tiemann reaction.

== Biography ==
Beginning in 1866, Tiemann studied pharmacy at the TU Braunschweig where he graduated in 1869. His professor in Brunswick wrote a letter of recommendation to August Wilhelm von Hofmann at the University of Berlin where Tiemann started as assistant of von Hofmann in 1869. In 1874 Wilhelm Haarmann and Tiemann started a company, after they discovered the synthesis of vanillin from coniferyl alcohol. The vanillin plant Holzminden was not very successful before Karl Reimer discovered the Reimer-Tiemann reaction which opened an alternative synthesis route to vanillin. In 1882 Tiemann became a professor at the University of Berlin. During this time, he also served as editor of the influential scientific journal Berichte der Deutschen Chemischen Gesellschaft.

He was involved in the first synthesis of Jonon a compound of the sweet violet (Viola odorata), which became a huge success for Harmann & Reimer company.

August Wilhelm von Hofmann married Berta the younger sister of Ferdinand Tiemann.

== Works ==
- Tiemann-Gärtner's Handbuch der Untersuchung und Beurtheilung der Wässer : zum Gebrauch für Apotheker, Ärzte, Chemiker, Fabrikanten, Medicinalbeamte und Techniker; mit 40 Holzstichen u. 10 Taf. . Vieweg, Braunschweig 4. Aufl. / bearb. von Georg Walter und August Gärtner 1895 Digital edition by the University and State Library Düsseldorf
