= Vanillin =

Skeletal formula of vanillin
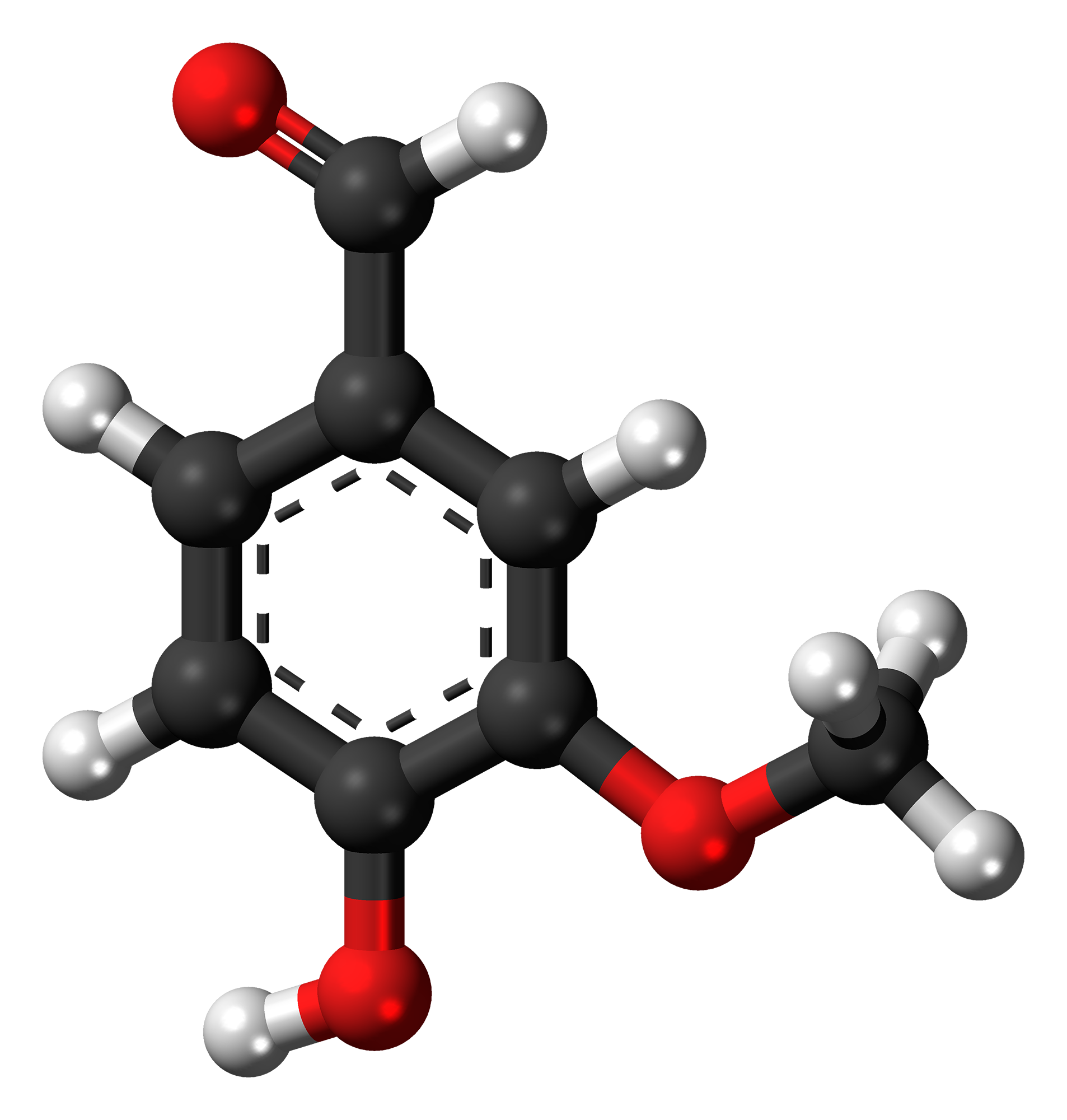
Spacefill model of vanillin
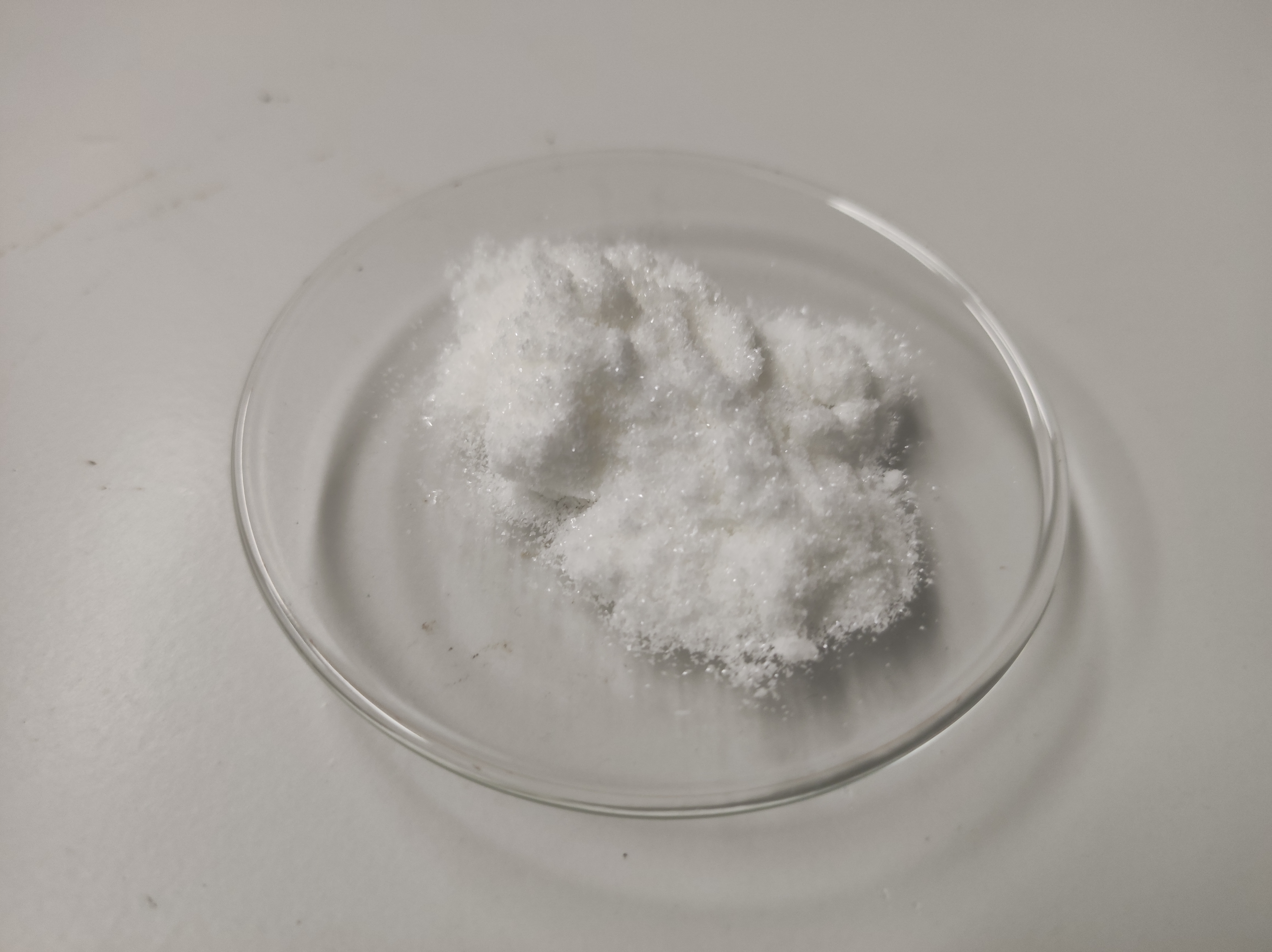

Names
- Preferred IUPAC name 4-Hydroxy-3-methoxybenzaldehyde
- Other names Vanillin; Methyl vanillin Vanillic aldehyde

Identifiers
CAS Number	121-33-5
3D model (JSmol)	Interactive image
Beilstein Reference	472792
ChEBI	CHEBI:18346
ChEMBL	ChEMBL13883
ChemSpider	13860434
ECHA InfoCard	100.004.060
EC Number	204-465-2
Gmelin Reference	3596
IUPHAR/BPS	6412
KEGG	D00091
MeSH	vanillin
PubChem CID	1183
RTECS number	YW5775000
UNII	CHI530446X
CompTox Dashboard (EPA)	DTXSID0021969
- InChI: InChI=1S/C8H8O3/c1-11-8-4-6(5-9)2-3-7(8)10/h2-5,8H,1H3 Key: MWOOGOJBHIARFG-UHFFFAOYSA-N; InChI=1/C8H8O3/c1-11-8-4-6(5-9)2-3-7(8)10/h2-5,10H,1H3 Key: MWOOGOJBHIARFG-UHFFFAOYAS
- SMILES: c1(C=O)cc(OC)c(O)cc1

Properties
Chemical formula	C_{8}H_{8}O_{3}
Molar mass	152.149 g·mol^{−1}
Appearance	White solid
Odor	Vanilla, sweet, balsamic, pleasant
Density	1.056 g/cm^{3}
Melting point	81 °C (178 °F; 354 K)
Boiling point	285 °C (545 °F; 558 K)
Solubility in water	10 g/L
log P	1.208
Vapor pressure	>1 Pa
Acidity (pK_{a})	7.781
Basicity (pK_{b})	6.216

Structure
Crystal structure	Monoclinic

Thermochemistry
Std enthalpy of combustion (Δ_{c}H^{⦵}_{298})	−3.828 MJ/mol

Hazards
- GHS labelling
Pictograms	(GHS07: Exclamation mark)
Signal word	Warning
Hazard statements	H302, H317, H319
Precautionary statements	P280, P305+P351+P338
NFPA 704 (fire diamond)	1 1 0
Flash point	147 °C (297 °F; 420 K)
Safety data sheet (SDS)	ICSC 1740

Related compounds
Related compounds	Anisaldehyde; Apocynin; Eugenol; Phenol; Vanillyl alcohol
- Except where otherwise noted, data are given for materials in their standard state (at 25 °C [77 °F], 100 kPa). verify (what is ?) Infobox references

Vanillin is an organic compound with the molecular formula C_{8}H_{8}O_{3}. It is a phenolic aldehyde. Its functional groups include aldehyde, hydroxyl, and ether. It is the primary component of the ethanolic extract of the vanilla bean. Synthetic vanillin is now used more often than natural vanilla extract as a flavoring in foods, beverages, and pharmaceuticals.

Vanillin and ethylvanillin are used by the food industry; ethylvanillin is more expensive, but has a stronger note. It differs from vanillin by having an ethoxy group (−O−CH_{2}CH_{3}) instead of a methoxy group (−O−CH_{3}).

Natural vanilla extract is a mixture of several hundred different compounds in addition to vanillin. Artificial vanilla flavoring is often an ethanol solution of pure vanillin, usually of synthetic origin. Because of the scarcity and expense of natural vanilla, synthetic preparation of artificial vanilla flavoring has long been of interest. The first commercial synthesis of vanillin began with the more readily available natural compound eugenol (4-allyl-2-methoxyphenol). Today, artificial vanillin is made either from guaiacol or lignin.

Lignin-based artificial vanilla flavoring is alleged to have a richer flavor profile than that from guaiacol-based artificial vanilla; the difference is due to the presence of acetovanillone, a minor component in the lignin-derived product that is not found in vanillin synthesized from guaiacol. (Note: According to Esposito 1997, blind taste-testing panels cannot distinguish between the flavors of synthetic vanillin from lignin and those from guaicol, but can distinguish the odors of these two types of synthetic vanilla extracts. Guaiacol vanillin, adulterated with acetovanillone, has an odor indistinguishable from lignin vanillin.)

== Natural history ==
Although it is generally accepted that vanilla was domesticated in Mesoamerica and subsequently spread to the Old World in the 16th century, in 2019, researchers published a paper stating that vanillin residue had been discovered inside jars within a tomb in Canaan dating to the 2nd millennium BCE, suggesting the possible cultivation of an unidentified, Old World-endemic Vanilla species in Canaan since the Middle Bronze Age. Traces of vanillin were also found in wine jars in Jerusalem, which were used by the Judahite elite before the city was destroyed in 586 BCE.

Vanilla beans, called tlilxochitl, were discovered and cultivated as a flavoring for beverages by native Mesoamerican peoples, most famously the Totonacs of modern-day Veracruz, Mexico. Since at least the early 15th century, the Aztecs used vanilla as a flavoring for chocolate in drinks called xocohotl.

== Synthetic history ==
Vanillin was first isolated as a relatively pure substance in 1858 by Théodore Nicolas Gobley, who obtained it by evaporating a vanilla extract to dryness and recrystallizing the resulting solids from hot water. In 1874, the German scientists Ferdinand Tiemann and Wilhelm Haarmann deduced its chemical structure, at the same time finding a synthesis for vanillin from coniferin, a glucoside of coniferyl alcohol found in pine bark. Tiemann and Haarmann founded a company Haarmann and Reimer (now part of Symrise) and started the first industrial production of vanillin using their process (now known as the Reimer–Tiemann reaction) in Holzminden, Germany. In 1876, Karl Reimer synthesized vanillin (2) from guaiacol (1).

Total synthesis of vanillin by Reimer

By the late 19th century, semisynthetic vanillin derived from the eugenol found in clove oil was commercially available. (Note: According to Hocking 1997, synthetic vanillin was sold commercially in 1874, the same year Tiemann and Haarmann's original synthesis was published. Haarmann and Reimer, one of the corporate ancestors of the modern flavor and aroma manufacturer Symrise, was in fact established in 1874. However, Esposito 1997 claims that synthetic vanillin first became available in 1894 when Rhône-Poulenc (since 1998, Rhodia) entered the vanillin business. If the former claim is correct, the authors of the latter article, being employees of Rhône-Poulenc, may have been unaware of any previous vanillin manufacture.)

Synthetic vanillin became significantly more available in the 1930s, when production from clove oil was supplanted by production from the lignin-containing waste produced by sulfite pulping for preparing wood pulp for the paper industry. By 1981, a single pulp and paper mill in Thorold, Ontario, supplied 60% of the world market for synthetic vanillin. However, subsequent developments in the wood pulp industry have made its lignin wastes less attractive as a raw material for vanillin synthesis. Today, approximately 15% of the world's production of vanillin is still made from lignin wastes, while approximately 85% is synthesized in a two-step process from the petrochemical precursors guaiacol and glyoxylic acid.

Beginning in 2000, Rhodia began marketing biosynthetic vanillin prepared by the action of microorganisms on ferulic acid extracted from rice bran. This product, sold at USD$700/kg under the trademarked name Rhovanil Natural, is not cost-competitive with petrochemical vanillin, which sells for around US$15/kg. However, unlike vanillin synthesized from lignin or guaiacol, it can be labeled as a natural flavoring.

== Occurrence ==
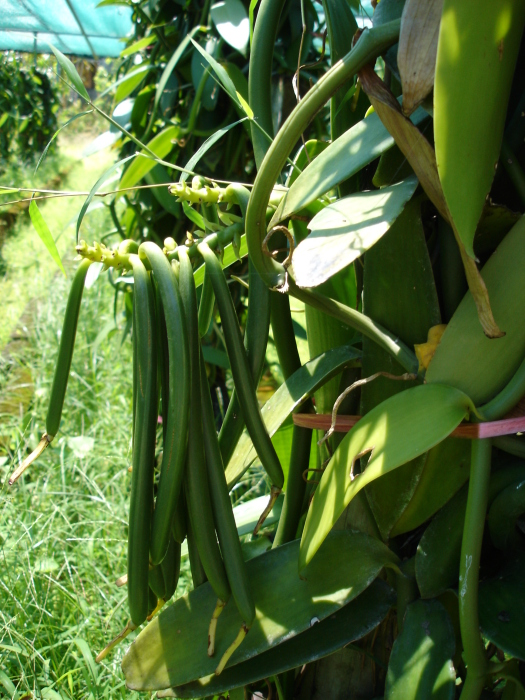
These green seed pods contain vanillin only in its glucoside form, and lack the characteristic odor of vanilla.

Vanillin is most prominent as the principal flavor and aroma compound in vanilla. Cured vanilla pods contain about 2% by dry weight vanillin. Relatively pure vanillin may be visible as a white dust or "frost" on the exteriors of cured pods of high quality.

It is also found in Leptotes bicolor, a species of orchid native to Paraguay and southern Brazil, and the Southern Chinese red pine.

At lower concentrations, vanillin contributes to the flavor and aroma profiles of foodstuffs as diverse as olive oil, butter, raspberry, and lychee fruits.

Aging in oak barrels imparts vanillin to some wines, vinegar, and spirits.

In other foods, heat treatment generates vanillin from other compounds. In this way, vanillin contributes to the flavor and aroma of coffee, maple syrup, and whole-grain products, including corn tortillas and oatmeal.

== Production ==
=== Natural production ===
Natural vanillin is extracted from the seed pods of Vanilla planifolia, a vining orchid native to Mexico, but now grown in tropical areas around the globe. Madagascar is presently the largest producer of natural vanillin.

Glucovanillin, the β-D-glucoside of vanillin

As harvested, the green seed pods contain vanillin in the form of glucovanillin, its β-D-glucoside; the green pods do not have the flavor or odor of vanilla. Vanillin is released from glucovanillin by the action of the enzyme β-glucosidase during ripening and during the curing process.

After being harvested, their flavor is developed by a months-long curing process, the details of which vary among vanilla-producing regions, but in broad terms it proceeds as follows:

First, the seed pods are blanched in hot water, to arrest the processes of the living plant tissues. Then, for 1–2 weeks, the pods are alternately sunned and sweated: during the day they are laid out in the sun, and each night wrapped in cloth and packed in airtight boxes to sweat. During this process, the pods become dark brown, and enzymes in the pod release vanillin as the free molecule. Finally, the pods are dried and further aged for several months, during which time their flavors further develop. Several methods have been described for curing vanilla in days rather than months, although they have not been widely developed in the natural vanilla industry, (Note: Dignum 2001 reviews several such proposed innovations in vanilla processing, including processes in which the seed pods are chopped, frozen, warmed by a heat source other than the sun, or crushed and treated by various enzymes. Whether or not these procedures produce a product whose taste is comparable to traditionally prepared natural vanilla, many of them are incompatible with the customs of the natural vanilla market, in which the vanilla beans are sold whole, and graded by, among other factors, their length.) with its focus on producing a premium product by established methods, rather than on innovations that might alter the product's flavor profile.

==== Biosynthesis ====
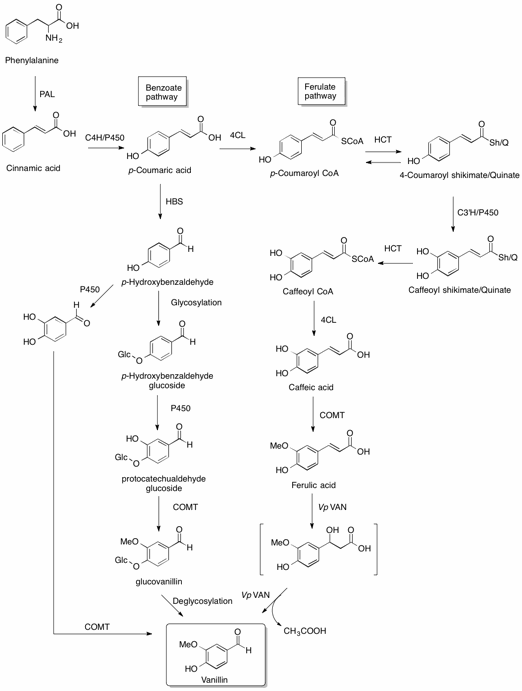
Some of the proposed routes of vanillin biosynthesis

Although the exact route of vanillin biosynthesis in V. planifolia is currently unknown, several pathways are proposed for its biosynthesis. Vanillin biosynthesis is generally agreed to be part of the phenylpropanoid pathway starting with L-phenylalanine, which is deaminated by phenylalanine ammonia lyase (PAL) to form t-cinnamic acid. The para position of the ring is then hydroxylated by the cytochrome P450 enzyme cinnamate 4-hydroxylase (C4H/P450) to create p-coumaric acid. Then, in the proposed ferulate pathway, 4-hydroxycinnamoyl-CoA ligase (4CL) attaches p-coumaric acid to coenzyme A (CoA) to create p-coumaroyl CoA. Hydroxycinnamoyl transferase (HCT) then converts p-coumaroyl CoA to 4-coumaroyl shikimate/quinate. This subsequently undergoes oxidation by the P450 enzyme coumaroyl ester 3'-hydroxylase (C3'H/P450) to give caffeoyl shikimate/quinate. HCT then exchanges the shikimate/quinate for CoA to create caffeoyl CoA, and 4CL removes CoA to afford caffeic acid. Caffeic acid then undergoes methylation by caffeic acid O-methyltransferase (COMT) to give ferulic acid. Finally, vanillin synthase hydratase/lyase (vp/VAN) catalyzes hydration of the double bond in ferulic acid followed by a retro-aldol elimination to afford vanillin. Vanillin can also be produced from vanilla glycoside with the additional final step of deglycosylation. In the past p-hydroxybenzaldehyde was speculated to be a precursor for vanillin biosynthesis. However, a 2014 study using radiolabelled precursor indicated that p-hydroxybenzaldehyde is not used to synthesise vanillin or vanillin glucoside in the vanilla orchids.

=== Chemical synthesis ===
The demand for vanilla flavoring has long exceeded the supply of vanilla beans. As of 2001, the annual demand for vanillin was 12,000 tons, but only 1,800 tons of natural vanillin were produced. The remainder was produced by chemical synthesis. Vanillin was first synthesized from eugenol (found in oil of clove) in 1874–75, less than 20 years after it was first identified and isolated. Vanillin was commercially produced from eugenol until the 1920s. Later it was synthesized from lignin-containing "brown liquor", a byproduct of the sulfite process for making wood pulp. Counterintuitively, though it uses waste materials, the lignin process is no longer popular because of environmental concerns, and today most vanillin is produced from guaiacol. Several routes exist for synthesizing vanillin from guaiacol.

At present, the most significant of these is the two-step process practiced by Rhodia since the 1970s, in which guaiacol (1) reacts with glyoxylic acid by electrophilic aromatic substitution. The resulting vanillylmandelic acid (2) is then converted by 4-hydroxy-3-methoxyphenylglyoxylic acid (3) to vanillin (4) by oxidative decarboxylation.

Although guaiacol can be obtained by pyrolysis of wood, the type intended for vanillin production is mainly produced by petrochemistry.

==== Wood-based vanillin ====
15% of the world's production of vanillin is produced from lignosulfonates, a byproduct from the manufacture of cellulose via the sulfite process. The sole remaining producer of wood-based vanillin is the company Borregaard located in Sarpsborg, Norway. For this kind of use, softwood is preferred because there are more guaiacyl units convertible to vanillin.

Early production of wood-based vanillin involved four plants: a sulfite pulp mill, a fermentation plant, a vanillin plant, and a Kraft (sulfate) pulp mill. The sulfite mill provides the brown liquor to the fermentation plant, which makes use of the residual sugar. The spent liquor is sent to the vanillin plant, which uses alkaline oxidation with air at 160–170 °C and 10–12 atm pressure, toluene extraction, and back-extraction with NaOH to obtain a crude sodium vanillate. Addition of sulfurous acid affords easy separation of the soluble sulfide addition compound of vanillin from insoluble impurities such as acetovanillone. The vanillin is extracted, and the remaining liquor is sent to the Kraft mill for burning to recover energy and sodium sulfide, both important for a Kraft mill. This process went out of favor in North America due to the large amounts of caustic liquids that need to be disposed of by the mill at the end: 160 kg for every 1 kg of vanillin produced. The recovery of sodium sulfide also became less and less profitable as the sodium-to-sulfur ratio became more and more unbalanced.

Borregaard is able to keep operating because it runs its own pulp mill. They have improved a process from Monsanto by using ultrafiltration to concentrate the incoming lignosulfonates, which reduces the amount of NaOH used and waste produced. The basic chemistry is unchanged: alkaline oxidation using a metal catalyst such a copper salt. According to Scientific American, vanillin produced this way contains aromatic impurities that add strength and creaminess to its flavor. This is probably due to acetovanillone being present.

=== Fermentation ===
The company Evolva has developed a genetically modified yeast which can produce vanillin. Because the microbe is a processing aid, the resulting vanillin would not fall under U.S. GMO labeling requirements, and because the production is nonpetrochemical, food using the ingredient can be said to contain no artificial ingredients. The biosynthetic process starts with glucose, or any sugar that can be converted into erythrose 4-phosphate (which leads to 3-dehydroshikimic acid). The end product is 98% pure and is also considered natural in the EU.

Using ferulic acid (a chemical found in rice) as an input and a specific non GMO species of Amycolatopsis bacteria, vanillin can be produced. Many other bacteria, either GMO or non-GMO, can be used for the same purpose. However, because vanillin inhibits the growth of free-floating bacteria, yields have been low. This can be overcome through the formation of biofilms, which has been done with the non-GMO B. subtilis strain CCTCC M2011162. However, using ferulic acid as the starting material does not qualify for "natural ingredient" in the EU.

Biotransformation of eugenol (from cloves) into vanillin by non-GMO microorganisms has also been reported. The same has been reported for guaiacol and guaicyl lignin (from conifers). These starting materials do not qualify for "natural ingredient" in the EU.

== Uses ==
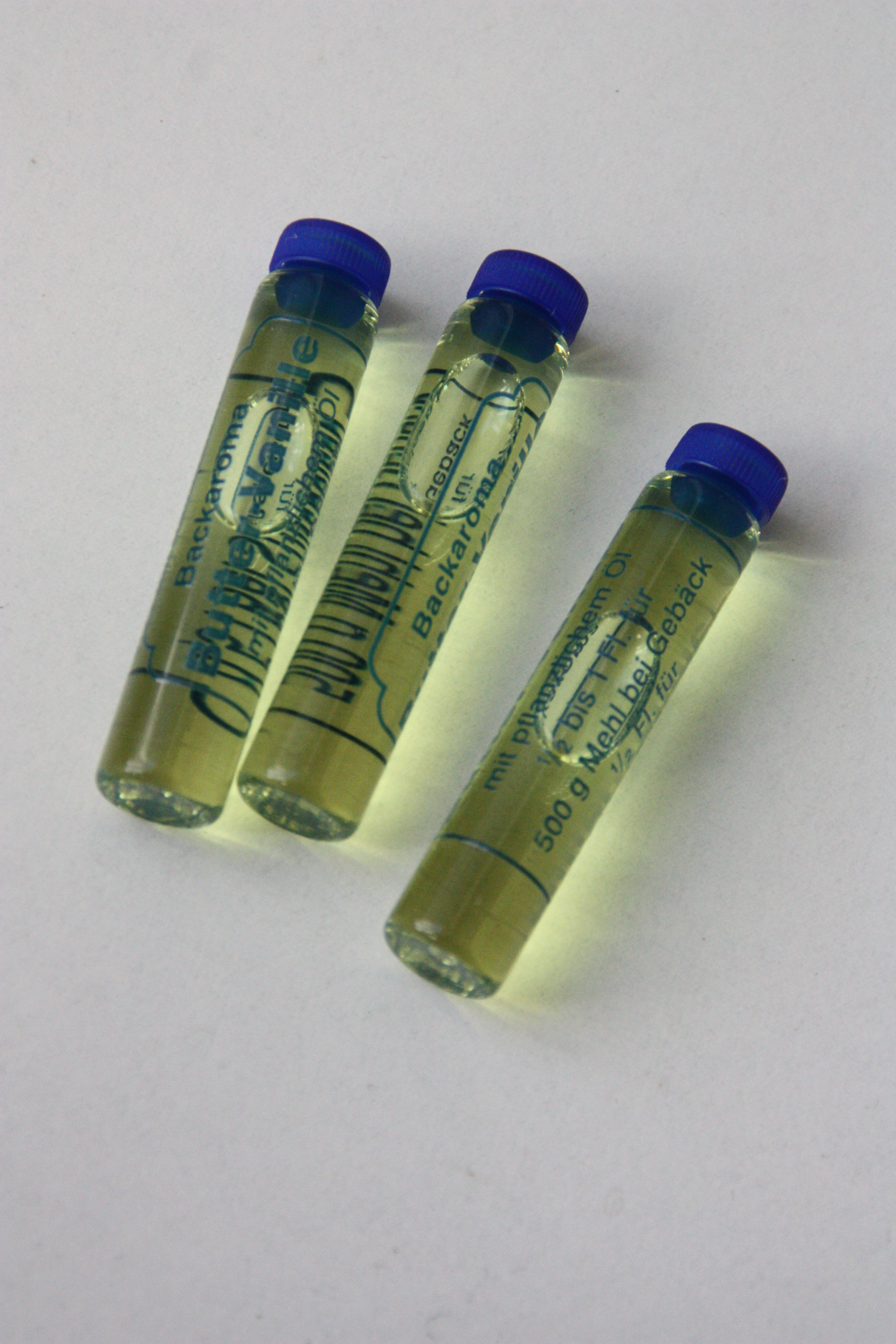
Butter-vanilla flavoring

The largest use of vanillin is as a flavoring, usually in sweet foods. The ice cream and chocolate industries together comprise 75% of the market for vanillin as a flavoring, with smaller amounts being used in confections and baked goods.

Vanillin is also used in the fragrance industry, in perfumes, and to mask unpleasant odors or tastes in medicines, livestock fodder, and cleaning products.

=== Biochemistry ===
Several studies have suggested that vanillin can affect the performance of antibiotics in laboratory conditions.

Vanillin can be used as a general-purpose stain for visualizing spots on thin-layer chromatography plates. This stain yields a range of colors for these different components.

Vanillin–HCl staining can be used to visualize the localisation of tannins in cells.

=== Manufacturing ===
Vanillin has been used as a chemical intermediate in the production of pharmaceuticals, cosmetics, and other fine chemicals. In 1970, more than half the world's vanillin production was used in the synthesis of other chemicals. Vanillin may be used to manufacture bioplastics.

== Adverse effects ==
Vanillin can trigger migraine headaches in a small fraction of the people who experience migraines.

Some people have allergic reactions to vanilla. They may be allergic to synthetically produced vanilla but not to natural vanilla, or the other way around, or to both.

Vanilla orchid plants can trigger contact dermatitis, especially among people working in the vanilla trade if they come into contact with the plant's sap. An allergic contact dermatitis called vanillism produces swelling and redness, and sometimes other symptoms. The sap of most species of vanilla orchid which exudes from cut stems or where beans are harvested can cause moderate to severe dermatitis if it comes in contact with bare skin. The sap of vanilla orchids contains calcium oxalate crystals, which are thought to be the main causative agent of contact dermatitis in vanilla plantation workers.

A pseudophytodermatitis called vanilla lichen can be caused by handling vanilla pods. It is not caused by vanilla itself but flour mites (Tyroglyphus farinae).

== Ecology ==
Scolytus multistriatus, one of the vectors of the Dutch elm disease, uses vanillin as a signal to find a host tree during oviposition.

== See also ==
- Phenolic compounds in wine
- Other positional isomers:
  - Isovanillin
  - ortho-Vanillin
  - 2-Hydroxy-5-methoxybenzaldehyde
  - 2-Hydroxy-4-methoxybenzaldehyde
- Benzaldehyde
- Protocatechuic aldehyde
- Syringaldehyde
