= C7H8O2 =

The molecular formula C_{7}H_{8}O_{2} (molar mass: 124.14 g/mol, exact mass: 124.05243 u) may refer to:

- 2-Acetyl-5-methylfuran
- Hydroxymethylphenols
  - Gastrodigenin
  - Salicyl alcohol
- Methoxyphenols (benzenediol monomethyl ethers)
  - Guaiacol
  - 3-Methoxyphenol
  - Mequinol
- Methylbenzenediols
  - 3-Methylcatechol
  - 4-Methylcatechol
  - Orcinol
- Phenylmethanediol
