= C9H8O4 =

The molecular formula C_{9}H_{8}O_{4} (molar mass: 180.15 g/mol, exact mass: 180.0423 u) may refer to:

- Acetozone
- Aspirin
- 4-Hydroxyphenylpyruvic acid, a natural phenol
- Dihydroxycinnamic acids:
  - Caffeic acid (3,4-Dihydroxycinnamic acid)
  - Umbellic acid (2,4-dihydroxycinnamic acid)
  - 2,3-Dihydroxycinnamic acid
  - 2,5-Dihydroxycinnamic acid
  - 3,5-Dihydroxycinnamic acid
- Homophthalic acid
- Monomethyl phthalate
- Uvitic acid
