= Dihydroxycinnamic acid =

Dihydroxycinnamic acid may refer to several molecules with the molecular formula C_{9}H_{8}O_{4} including:

- Caffeic acid (3,4-Dihydroxycinnamic acid), a hydroxycinammic acid
- Umbellic acid (2,4-dihydroxycinnamic acid), a hydroxycinammic acid
- 2,3-Dihydroxycinnamic acid, a hydroxycinammic acid
- 2,5-Dihydroxycinnamic acid, a hydroxycinammic acid
- 3,5-Dihydroxycinnamic acid, a hydroxycinammic acid
