= Coniferyl-aldehyde dehydrogenase =

Enzyme

coniferyl-aldehyde dehydrogenase

Identifiers
- EC no.: 1.2.1.68

Databases
- IntEnz: IntEnz view
- BRENDA: BRENDA entry
- ExPASy: NiceZyme view
- KEGG: KEGG entry
- MetaCyc: metabolic pathway
- PRIAM: profile
- PDB structures: RCSB PDB PDBe PDBsum
- Gene Ontology: AmiGO / QuickGO
Search
- PMC: articles
- PubMed: articles
- NCBI: proteins

In enzymology, coniferyl-aldehyde dehydrogenase (EC 1.2.1.68) is an enzyme that catalyzes the chemical reaction

{E)-coniferyl aldehyde
+ NAD^{+}
H_{2}O
H^{+}
H_{2}O
H^{+}
ferulic acid
+ NADH

The three substrates of this enzyme are (E)-coniferyl aldehyde, oxidised nicotinamide adenine dinucleotide (NAD^{+}), and water. Its products are ferulic acid, reduced NADH, and a proton. The enzyme can use nicotinamide adenine dinucleotide phosphate as an alternative cofactor.

This enzyme belongs to the family of oxidoreductases, specifically those acting on the aldehyde or oxo group of donor with NAD+ or NADP+ as acceptor. The systematic name of this enzyme class is coniferyl aldehyde:NAD(P)+ oxidoreductase.
