= Sinapaldehyde =

- Kekulé skeletal formula of sinapaldehyde (2E)-2-en with some implicit hydrogens shown and one explicit hydrogen added

Names
- Systematic IUPAC name (E)-3-(4-Hydroxy-3,5-dimethoxyphenyl)prop-2-enal
- Other names: (trans)-3,5-Dimethoxy-4-hydroxycinnamaldehyde; Sinapic aldehyde; Sinapinaldehyde; Sinapoyl aldehyde; Sinapyl aldehyde

Identifiers
CAS Number	4206-58-0
3D model (JSmol)	Interactive image
Beilstein Reference	2215799
ChEBI	CHEBI:27949
ChEMBL	ChEMBL225067
ChemSpider	4444359
ECHA InfoCard	100.156.065
EC Number	627-731-3
KEGG	C05610
MeSH	Sinapaldehyde
PubChem CID	5280802
UNII	4VB87UV6WG
CompTox Dashboard (EPA)	DTXSID201016569
- InChI: InChI=1S/C11H12O4/c1-14-9-6-8(4-3-5-12)7-10(15-2)11(9)13/h3-7,13H,1-2H3/b4-3+ Key: CDICDSOGTRCHMG-ONEGZZNKSA-N
- SMILES: COC1=CC(=CC(=C1O)OC)/C=C/C=O

Properties
Chemical formula	C_{11}H_{12}O_{4}
Molar mass	208.213 g·mol^{−1}
Melting point	104 to 106 °C (219 to 223 °F; 377 to 379 K)
log P	1.686
Acidity (pK_{a})	9.667
Basicity (pK_{b})	4.330

Hazards
- GHS labelling
Pictograms	(GHS07: Exclamation mark)
Signal word	Warning
Hazard statements	H315, H319, H335

Related compounds
Related alkenals	Cinnamaldehyde Coniferyl aldehyde DMACA reagent 2-Nitrocinnamaldehyde
- Except where otherwise noted, data are given for materials in their standard state (at 25 °C [77 °F], 100 kPa). Infobox references

Sinapaldehyde is an organic compound with the formula HO(CH_{3}O)_{2}C_{6}H_{2}CH=CHCHO. It is a derivative of cinnamaldehyde, featuring one hydroxy group and two methoxy groups as substituents. It is an intermediate in the formation of sinapyl alcohol, a lignol that is a major precursor to lignin.

== Biosynthetic role ==
In sweetgum (Liquidambar styraciflua), sinapaldehyde arises in two steps from coniferyl aldehyde beginning with hydroxylation mediated by coniferyl aldehyde 5-hydroxylase. The diphenol is then methylated at the 5-OH by the action of caffeate O-methyltransferase.

Sinapaldehyde is reduced to the alcohol by the action of dehydrogenase enzymes. In Arabidopsis thaliana, the enzyme dihydroflavonol 4-reductase uses NADP^{+} to reduce sinapaldehyde to sinapyl alcohol.

It is found in Senra incana (Hibisceae). It is a low molecular weight phenol that is susceptible to extraction from cork stoppers into wine.

== See also ==
- Phenolic content in wine
- Syringaldehyde
- Syringol
- Syringic acid
- Acetosyringone
- Sinapinic acid
- Sinapine
- Canolol
