= Triferulic acid =

Triferulic acids, also known as dehydrotriferulic acids, are a type of oligomeric natural phenols formed from ferulic acid.

5-5',8'-O-4"-Triferulic acid can be found in maize bran
