= Senra =

Scientific classification
- Kingdom: Plantae
- Clade: Tracheophytes
- Clade: Angiosperms
- Clade: Eudicots
- Clade: Rosids
- Order: Malvales
- Family: Malvaceae
- Tribe: Hibisceae
- Genus: Senra; Cav.
- Species: S. incana

Binomial name
- Senra incana Cav.

Synonyms
- Synonymy: Dumreichera Hochst. & Steud.; Serraea Spreng.; Dumreichera arabica Hochst. & Steud.; Gossypium bakeri G.Watt; Senra arabica Webb; Senra bakeri (G.Watt) Prokh.; Senra incana subsp. migiurtinorum Chiov.; Senra incana var. scassellatii (Mattei) Senni; Senra nubica Webb; Senra nubica var. microphylla Mattei; Senra nubica var. scassellatii Mattei; Senra zoes Volkens & Schweinf.; Serraea arabica (Hochst. & Steud.) Mattei; Serraea incana (Cav.) Spreng.; Serraea nubica (Webb) Mattei; Serraea rupestris Edgew.; Serraea zoeae (Volkens & Schweinf.) Mattei

Genus of flowering plants

Senra is a genus of flowering plants in tribe Hibisceae of the family Malvaceae. It includes single species, Senra incana, an annual or perennial native to northeastern tropical Africa (Kenya to Sudan), the Arabian Peninsula, and India and Pakistan, where it grows in deserts and dry shrublands.

The plant produces the phenolic compounds coniferaldehyde, scopoletin, sinapaldehyde and syringaldehyde.
