= Sinapine esterase =

Identifiers
- EC no.: 3.1.1.49
- CAS no.: 72506-67-3

Databases
- IntEnz: IntEnz view
- BRENDA: BRENDA entry
- ExPASy: NiceZyme view
- KEGG: KEGG entry
- MetaCyc: metabolic pathway
- PRIAM: profile
- PDB structures: RCSB PDB PDBe PDBsum
- Gene Ontology: AmiGO / QuickGO
Search
- PMC: articles
- PubMed: articles
- NCBI: proteins

The enzyme sinapine esterase (EC 3.1.1.49) catalyzes the hydrolysis reaction:

sinapine
H_{2}O
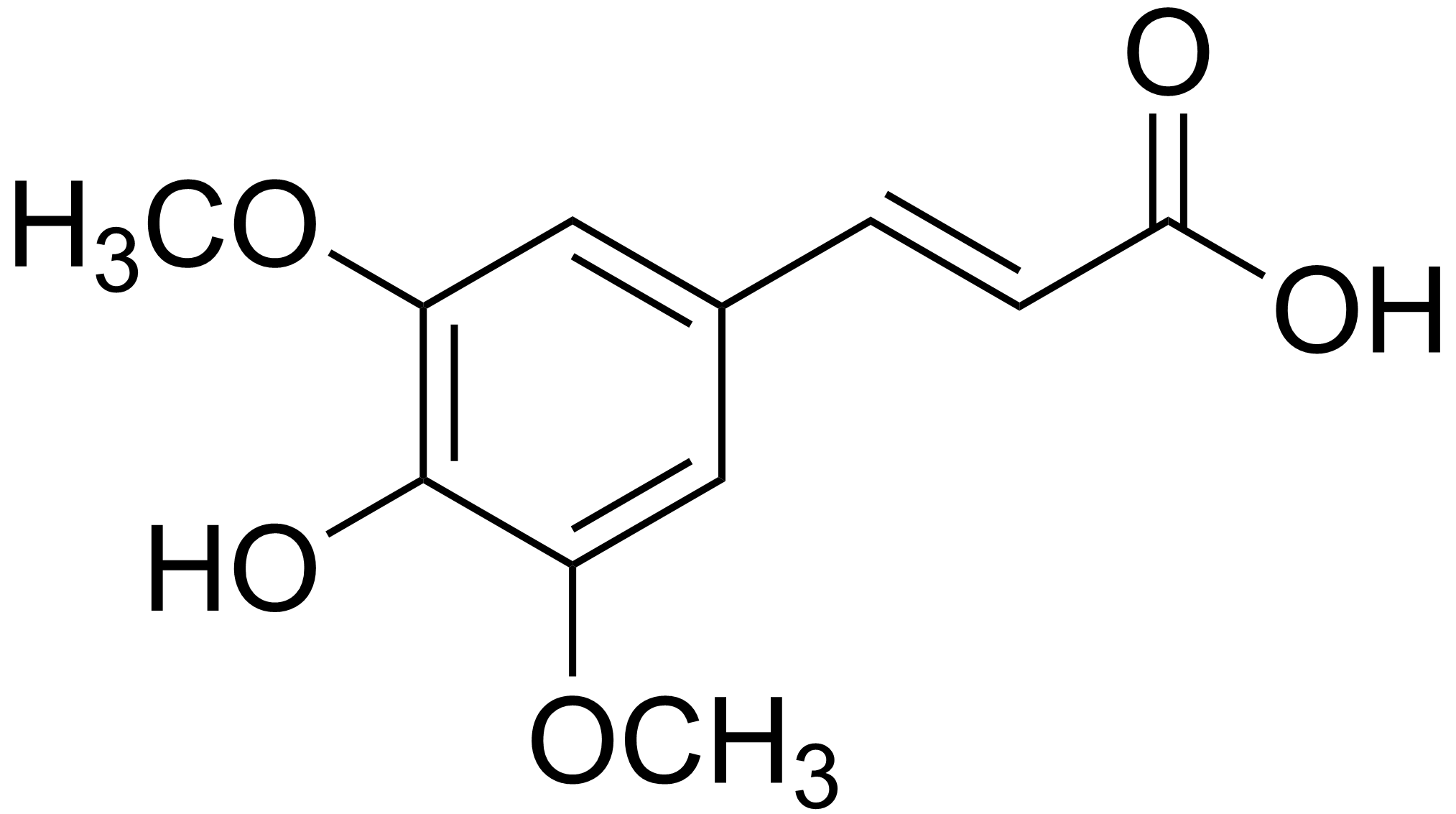
sinapinic acid
+
choline

Sinapine and sinapinic acid are found widely in brassica.

This enzyme belongs to the family of hydrolases, specifically those acting on carboxylic ester bonds. The systematic name of this enzyme class is sinapoylcholine sinapohydrolase. This enzyme is also called aromatic choline esterase.
