= 3-(3-hydroxyphenyl)propanoate hydroxylase =

Class of enzymes

Identifiers
- EC no.: 1.14.13.127

Databases
- IntEnz: IntEnz view
- BRENDA: BRENDA entry
- ExPASy: NiceZyme view
- KEGG: KEGG entry
- MetaCyc: metabolic pathway
- PRIAM: profile
- PDB structures: RCSB PDB PDBe PDBsum
Search
- PMC: articles
- PubMed: articles
- NCBI: proteins

3-(3-hydroxyphenyl)propanoate hydroxylase (EC 1.14.13.127, mhpA (gene)) is an enzyme with systematic name 3-(3-hydroxyphenyl)propanoate,NADH:oxygen oxidoreductase (2-hydroxylating). This enzyme catalyses the following chemical reaction

3-hydroxybenzenepropanoic acid
+ NADH
O_{2} + H^{+}
H_{2}O
2,3-dihydroxyphenylpropionic acid
+ NAD^{+}

The four substrates of this enzyme are 3-hydroxybenzenepropanoic acid, reduced nicotinamide adenine dinucleotide (NADH), oxygen, and a proton. Its products are 2,3-dihydroxyphenylpropionic acid, oxidised NAD^{+}, and water. It is a flavoprotein that uses flavin adenine dinucleotide as a cofactor.

The enzyme can act on related substrates, for example to convert 3'-hydroxycinnamic acid to 2,3-dihydroxycinnamic acid:

3'-hydroxycinnamic acid
2,3-dihydroxycinnamic acid
