= Coniferyl-alcohol dehydrogenase =

Enzyme

coniferyl-alcohol dehydrogenase

Identifiers
- EC no.: 1.1.1.194
- CAS no.: 37250-27-4

Databases
- IntEnz: IntEnz view
- BRENDA: BRENDA entry
- ExPASy: NiceZyme view
- KEGG: KEGG entry
- MetaCyc: metabolic pathway
- PRIAM: profile
- PDB structures: RCSB PDB PDBe PDBsum
- Gene Ontology: AmiGO / QuickGO
Search
- PMC: articles
- PubMed: articles
- NCBI: proteins

In enzymology, coniferyl-alcohol dehydrogenase (EC 1.1.1.194) is an enzyme that catalyzes the chemical reaction

coniferyl alcohol
+ NADP^{+}
H^{+}
H^{+}
coniferyl aldehyde
+ NADPH

The two substrates of this enzyme are coniferyl alcohol and oxidised nicotinamide adenine dinucleotide phosphate (NADP^{+}). Its products are coniferyl aldehyde, reduced NADPH, and a proton.

This enzyme belongs to the family of oxidoreductases, specifically those acting on the CH-OH group of donor with NAD^{+} or NADP^{+} as acceptor. The systematic name of this enzyme class is coniferyl-alcohol:NADP^{+} oxidoreductase. This enzyme is also called CAD.
