= Anoxomer =

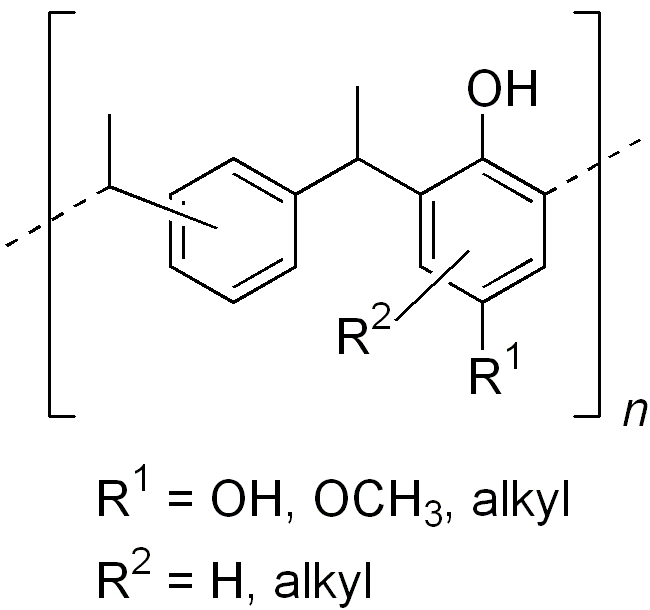

Names
- Other names Poly Ao-79

Identifiers
CAS Number	60837-57-2
ChEMBL	ChEMBL2108977
ChemSpider	none
E number	E323 (antioxidants, ...)
KEGG	D02949
PubChem CID	17397106
UNII	BFJ07QTZ0Y
CompTox Dashboard (EPA)	DTXSID4044248

Properties
Chemical formula	variable
Molar mass	variable
- Except where otherwise noted, data are given for materials in their standard state (at 25 °C [77 °F], 100 kPa). verify (what is ?) Infobox references

Anoxomer is a food additive with E number E323. It is a non-digestible polymeric antioxidant. It was designed to allow the introduction of established antioxidants in a non-absorbable manner in order to avoid potential health risk associated with their digestion.

Anoxomer is prepared by condensation polymerization of divinylbenzene and a mixture of antioxidant monomers including tert-butylhydroquinone, tert-butylphenol, hydroxyanisole, p-cresol and 4,4'-isopropylidenediphenol.
