= N-feruloylglycine deacylase =

Class of enzymes

Identifiers
- EC no.: 3.5.1.71
- CAS no.: 118731-84-3

Databases
- BRENDA: enzyme data
- ExPASy: NiceZyme view
- KEGG: enzyme entry
- MetaCyc: metabolic pathway
- Rhea: reactions
- PDB structures: RCSB PDB PDBe PDBsum
- Gene Ontology: AmiGO / QuickGO
Search
- PMC: articles
- PubMed: articles
- NCBI: proteins

N-feruloylglycine deacylase (EC 3.5.1.71) is an enzyme characterised from barley that catalyzes the hydrolysis reaction which converts N-feruloylglycine to ferulic acid and glycine:

N-feruloylglycine
H_{2}O
ferulic acid
+
glycine

This enzyme is a hydrolase, one acting on carbon-nitrogen bonds other than peptide bonds, specifically in linear amides. The systematic name of this enzyme class is N-feruloylglycine amidohydrolase. This enzyme is also called N-feruloylglycine hydrolase.
