= Sinapoylglucose—sinapoylglucose O-sinapoyltransferase =

Sinapoylglucose-sinapoylglucose O-sinapoyltransferase

Identifiers
- EC no.: 2.3.1.103
- CAS no.: 103537-11-7

Databases
- IntEnz: IntEnz view
- BRENDA: BRENDA entry
- ExPASy: NiceZyme view
- KEGG: KEGG entry
- MetaCyc: metabolic pathway
- PRIAM: profile
- PDB structures: RCSB PDB PDBe PDBsum
- Gene Ontology: AmiGO / QuickGO
Search
- PMC: articles
- PubMed: articles
- NCBI: proteins

Sinapoylglucose---sinapoylglucose O-sinapoyltransferase (EC 2.3.1.103) is an enzyme that catalyzes the chemical reaction

2
1-O-sinapoyl-beta-D-glucose
1,2-di-O-sinapoyl-beta-D-glucose
+
D-glucose

The enzyme from radish combines two units of its substrate, 1-O-sinapoyl-beta-D-glucoside to give the products, 1,2-di-O-sinapoyl-beta-D-glucose and D-glucose. Derivatives of the parent sinapinic acid are commonly found in brassica.

This enzyme belongs to the family of transferases, specifically those acyltransferases transferring groups other than aminoacyl groups. The systematic name of this enzyme class is 1-O-(4-hydroxy-3,5-dimethoxycinnamoyl)-beta-D-glucoside:1-O-(4-hydro xy-3,5-dimethoxycinnamoyl-beta-D-glucoside 1-O-sinapoyltransferase. Other names in common use include hydroxycinnamoylglucose-hydroxycinnamoylglucose, hydroxycinnamoyltransferase, 1-(hydroxycinnamoyl)-glucose:1-(hydroxycinnamoyl)-glucose, and hydroxycinnamoyltransferase.
