= C16H18N2O3 =

The molecular formula C_{16}H_{18}N_{2}O_{3} (molar mass: 286.331 g/mol) may refer to:

- Cromakalim
- Difenoxuron
