= Sinapate 1-glucosyltransferase =

Class of enzymes

Identifiers
- EC no.: 2.4.1.120
- CAS no.: 74082-53-4

Databases
- IntEnz: IntEnz view
- BRENDA: BRENDA entry
- ExPASy: NiceZyme view
- KEGG: KEGG entry
- MetaCyc: metabolic pathway
- PRIAM: profile
- PDB structures: RCSB PDB PDBe PDBsum
- Gene Ontology: AmiGO / QuickGO
Search
- PMC: articles
- PubMed: articles
- NCBI: proteins

Sinapate 1-glucosyltransferase (EC 2.4.1.120) is an enzyme that catalyzes the chemical reaction:

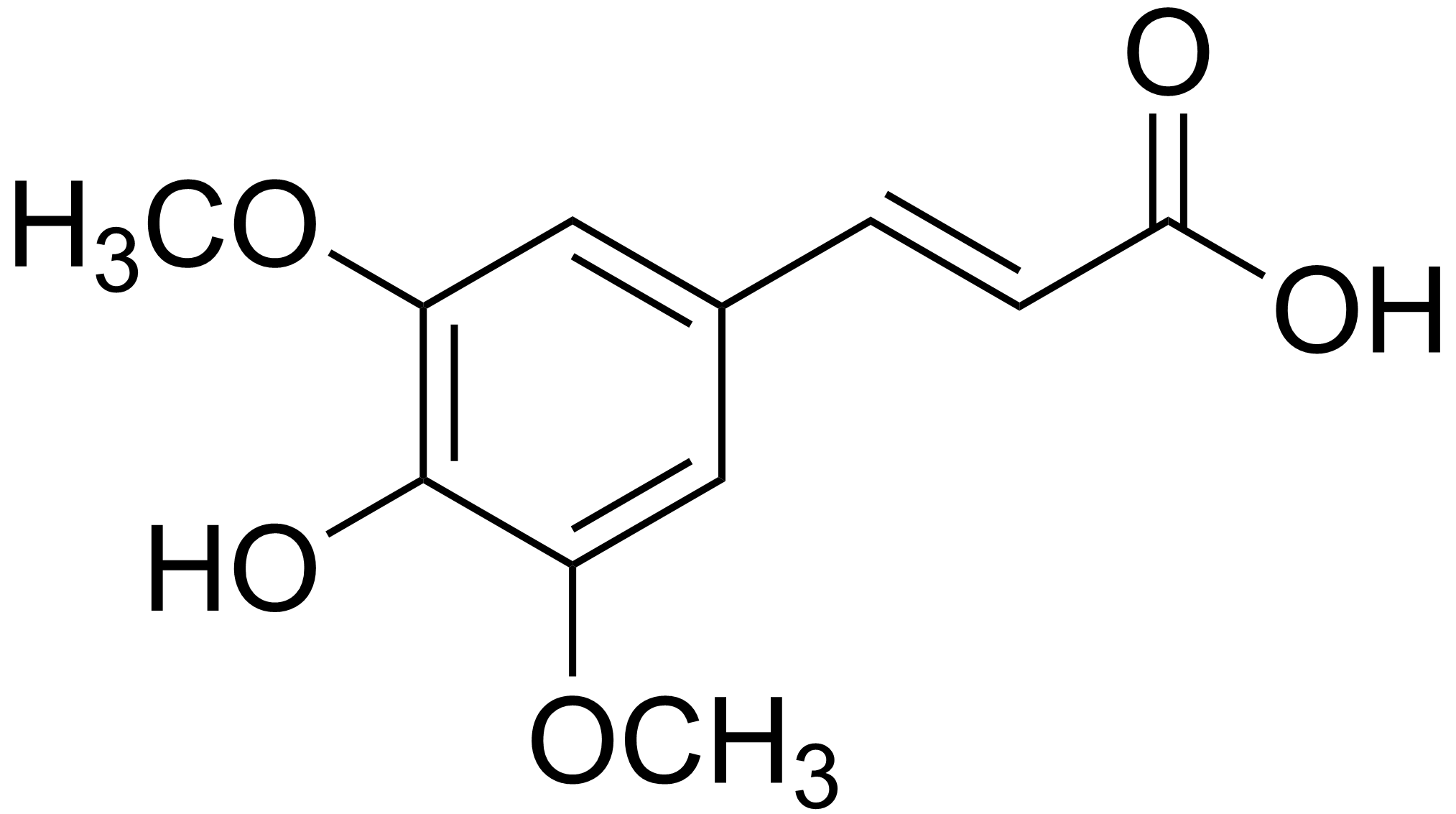
sinapinic acid
+ UDP-glucose
UDP
1-O-sinapoyl-β-D-glucose

The two substrates of this enzyme characterised from radish are sinapinic acid and UDP-glucose. Its products are 1-O-sinapoyl-β-D-glucose and uridine diphosphate (UDP).

The product is an intermediate in the biosynthesis of sinapine.

Sinapine

This enzyme belongs to the family of glycosyltransferases, specifically the hexosyltransferases. The systematic name of this enzyme class is UDP-glucose:sinapate D-glucosyltransferase. Other names in common use include uridine diphosphoglucose-sinapate glucosyltransferase, UDP-glucose:sinapic acid glucosyltransferase, uridine 5'-diphosphoglucose-hydroxycinnamic acid, and acylglucosyltransferase.
