= Feruloyl esterase =

feruloyl esterase

Identifiers
- EC no.: 3.1.1.73
- CAS no.: 134712-49-5

Databases
- IntEnz: IntEnz view
- BRENDA: BRENDA entry
- ExPASy: NiceZyme view
- KEGG: KEGG entry
- MetaCyc: metabolic pathway
- PRIAM: profile
- PDB structures: RCSB PDB PDBe PDBsum
- Gene Ontology: AmiGO / QuickGO
Search
- PMC: articles
- PubMed: articles
- NCBI: proteins

The enzyme feruloyl esterase (EC 3.1.1.73) catalyzes the reaction

feruloyl-polysaccharide + H_{2}O $\rightleftharpoons$ ferulate + polysaccharide

This enzyme belongs to the family of hydrolases, specifically those acting on carboxylic ester bonds. The systematic name is 4-hydroxy-3-methoxycinnamoyl-sugar hydrolase. Other names in common use include ferulic acid esterase (FAE), hydroxycinnamoyl esterase, hemicellulase accessory enzyme, cinnamoyl ester hydrolase (cinnAE).

== Structural studies ==
As of late 2007, 6 structures have been solved for this class of enzymes, with PDB accession codes 1USW, 1UWC, 1UZA, 2BJH, 2HL6, and 2IX9.
