= Homophthalic acid =

Names
- Preferred IUPAC name 2-(Carboxymethyl)benzoic acid
- Other names α-Carboxy-o-toluic acid Carboxyphenyl acetic acid

Identifiers
CAS Number	89-51-0
3D model (JSmol)	Interactive image
ChEMBL	ChEMBL1229545
ChemSpider	60010
ECHA InfoCard	100.001.740
EC Number	66643
PubChem CID	66643
UNII	3GE2MUV5GV
CompTox Dashboard (EPA)	DTXSID4058990
- InChI: InChI=1S/C9H8O4/c10-8(11)5-6-3-1-2-4-7(6)9(12)13/h1-4H,5H2,(H,10,11)(H,12,13) Key: ZHQLTKAVLJKSKR-UHFFFAOYSA-N
- SMILES: OC(=O)C1=CC=CC=C1CC(O)=O

Properties
Chemical formula	C_{9}H_{8}O_{4}
Molar mass	180.159 g·mol^{−1}
Appearance	Off-white to light yellow or pale green
Melting point	181 °C (358 °F; 454 K)

Hazards
- GHS labelling
Pictograms	(GHS07: Exclamation mark)
Signal word	Warning
Hazard statements	H315, H319, H335
Precautionary statements	P261, P264, P271, P280, P302+P352, P304+P340, P305+P351+P338, P312, P321, P332+P313, P337+P313, P362, P403+P233, P405, P501
- Except where otherwise noted, data are given for materials in their standard state (at 25 °C [77 °F], 100 kPa). Infobox references

Homophthalic acid is a dicarboxylic acid with the formula C_{6}H_{4}(CO_{2}H)CH_{2}CO_{2}H. It is a colorless solid. The compounds can be prepared by the Willgerodt reaction from 2-acetylbenzoic acid.

One of the uses is in the preparation of the NSAID tesicam.
