= Caffeic acid =

- 2D diagram of caffeic acid

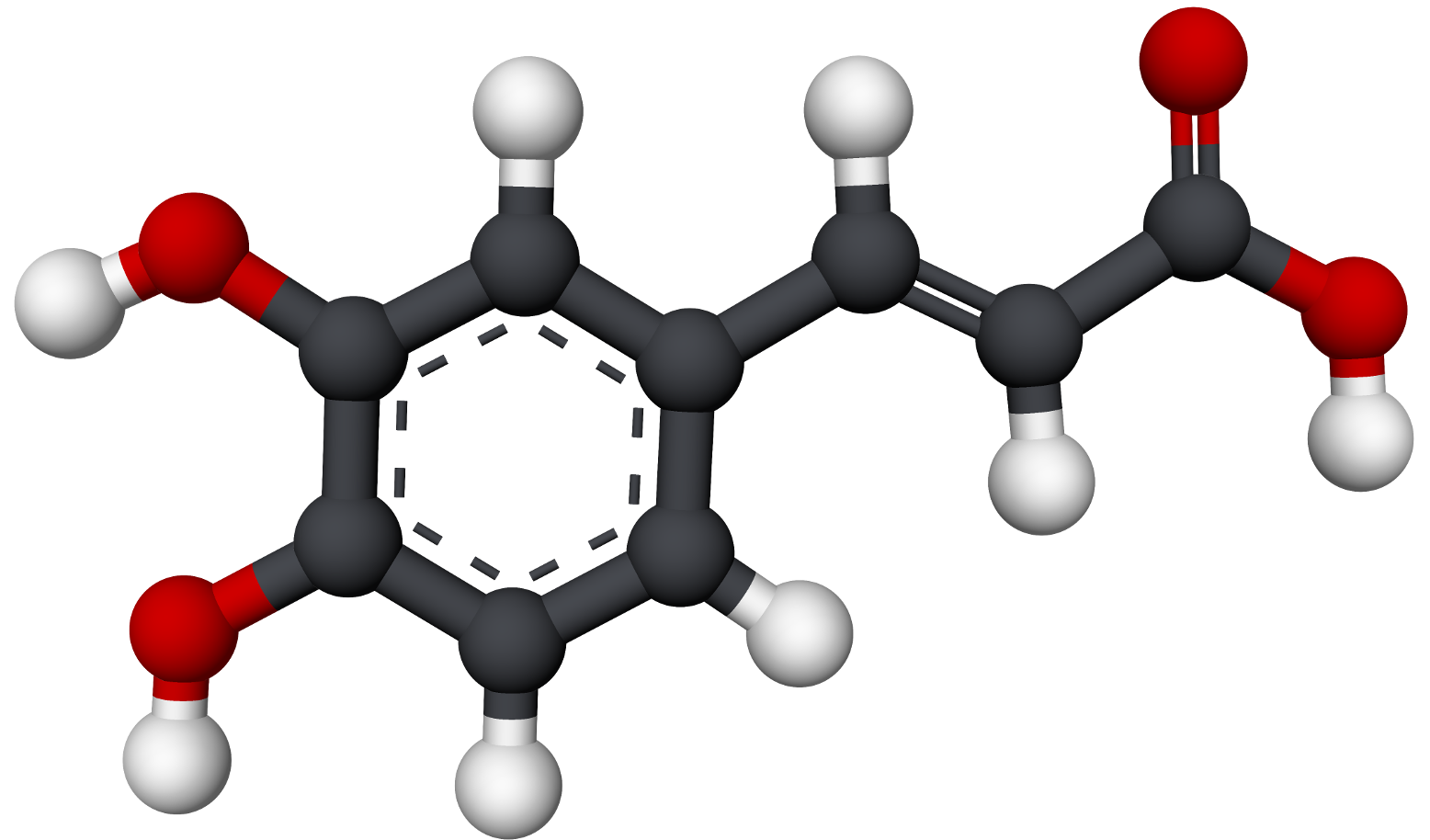
- 3D ball-and-stick model of caffeic acid

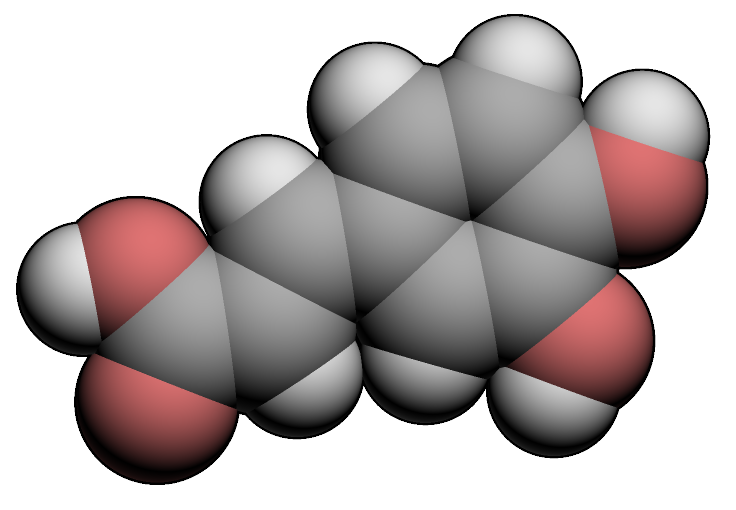
- 3D space filling model of caffeic acid

Names
- IUPAC names 3-(3,4-Dihydroxyphenyl)-2-propenoic acid 3,4-Dihydroxycinnamic acid trans-Caffeate; 3,4-Dihydroxy-trans-cinnamate (E)-3-(3,4-dihydroxyphenyl)-2-propenoic acid 3,4-Dihydroxybenzeneacrylicacid; 3-(3,4-Dihydroxyphenyl)-2-propenoic acid
- Preferred IUPAC name (2E)-3-(3,4-Dihydroxyphenyl)prop-2-enoic acid

Identifiers
CAS Number	501-16-6; 331-39-5 (non-specific)
3D model (JSmol)	Interactive image
Beilstein Reference	1954563
ChEBI	CHEBI:16433
ChEMBL	ChEMBL145
ChemSpider	600426
DrugBank	DB01880
ECHA InfoCard	100.005.784
EC Number	206-361-2
IUPHAR/BPS	5155
KEGG	C01197
PubChem CID	689043
UNII	U2S3A33KVM
CompTox Dashboard (EPA)	DTXSID901316055 DTXSID5020231, DTXSID901316055
- InChI: InChI=1S/C9H8O4/c10-7-3-1-6(5-8(7)11)2-4-9(12)13/h1-5,10-11H,(H,12,13)/b4-2+ Key: QAIPRVGONGVQAS-DUXPYHPUSA-N; InChI=1/C9H8O4/c10-7-3-1-6(5-8(7)11)2-4-9(12)13/h1-5,10-11H,(H,12,13)/b4-2+ Key: QAIPRVGONGVQAS-DUXPYHPUBE
- SMILES: O=C(O)\C=C\c1cc(O)c(O)cc1

Properties
Chemical formula	C_{9}H_{8}O_{4}
Molar mass	180.16 g/mol
Density	1.478 g/cm^{3}
Melting point	223 to 225 °C (433 to 437 °F; 496 to 498 K)
UV-vis (λ_{max})	327 nm and a shoulder at c. 295 nm in acidified methanol

Hazards
- GHS labelling
Pictograms	(GHS07: Exclamation mark) (GHS08: Health hazard)
Signal word	Warning
Hazard statements	H315, H319, H335, H351, H361
Precautionary statements	P201, P202, P261, P264, P271, P280, P281, P302+P352, P304+P340, P305+P351+P338, P308+P313, P312, P321, P332+P313, P337+P313, P362, P403+P233, P405, P501
NFPA 704 (fire diamond)	1 1 0

Related compounds
Related compounds	Chlorogenic acid Cichoric acid Coumaric acid Quinic acid
- Except where otherwise noted, data are given for materials in their standard state (at 25 °C [77 °F], 100 kPa). verify (what is ?) Infobox references

Caffeic acid is an organic compound with the formula (HO)_{2}C_{6}H_{3}CH=CHCO_{2}H. It plays a key role in scavenging reactive oxygen species (ROS) generated in energy metabolism. Caffeic acid is also responsible for maintaining normal levels of nitric oxide (NO) within cells. Caffeic acid is a yellow, solid chemical compound that is structurally classified as a hydroxycinnamic acid, and the molecule consists of both phenolic and acrylic functional groups. Caffeic acid is found in all plants as an intermediate in the biosynthesis of lignin, a naturally occurring complex carbohydrate representing the principal components of biomass and its residues. It is chemically unrelated to caffeine; instead, the shared name is related to its presence in coffee.

== Natural occurrences ==
Caffeic acid can be found in the bark of Eucalyptus globulus, the barley grain Hordeum vulgare, and the herb Dipsacus asperoides. It can also be found in the freshwater fern Salvinia molesta and in the mushroom Phellinus linteus.

=== Occurrences in food ===
Free caffeic acid can be found in a variety of beverages, including brewed coffee at 63.1-96.0 mg per 100 ml and red wine at 2 mg per 100 ml. It is found at relatively high levels in herbs of the mint family, especially thyme, sage and spearmint (at about 20 mg per 100 g), and in spices, such as Ceylon cinnamon and star anise (at about 22 mg per 100 g). Caffeic acid occurs at moderate levels in sunflower seeds (8 mg per 100 g), apple sauce, apricots and prunes (at about 1 mg per 100 g). It occurs at remarkably high levels in black chokeberry (141 mg per 100 g). It is also quite high in the South American herb yerba mate (150 mg per 100 g based on thin-layer chromatography densitometry and HPLC). It is also found at lower levels in barley and rye.

=== Biosynthesis ===
Caffeic acid is biosynthesized by hydroxylation of coumaroyl ester of quinic acid (esterified through a side chain alcohol). This hydroxylation produces the caffeic acid ester of shikimic acid, which converts to chlorogenic acid. It is the precursor to ferulic acid, coniferyl alcohol, and sinapyl alcohol, all of which are significant building blocks in lignin. The transformation to ferulic acid is catalyzed by the enzyme caffeate O-methyltransferase.

Caffeic acid and its derivative caffeic acid phenethyl ester (CAPE) are produced in many kinds of plants.

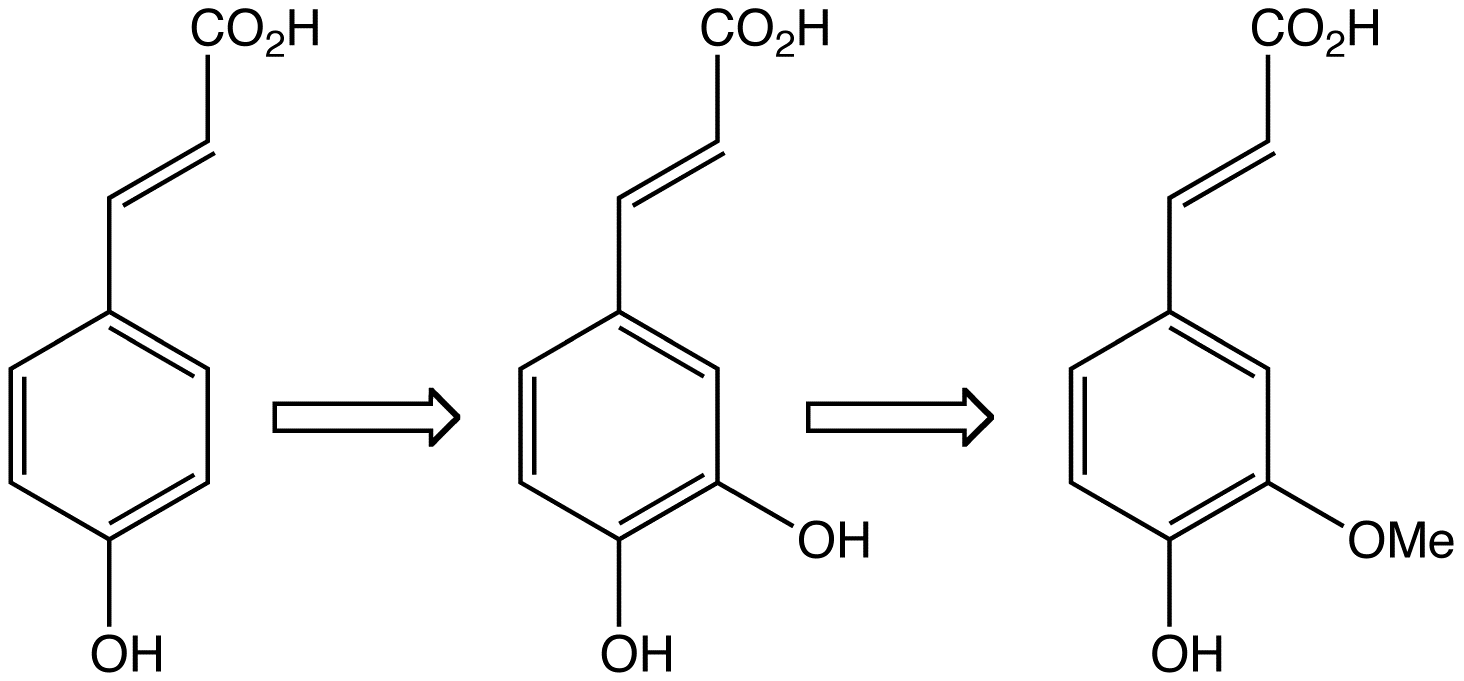
In plants, caffeic acid (middle) is formed from 4-hydroxycinnamic acid (left) and is transformed to ferulic acid.

Dihydroxyphenylalanine ammonia-lyase was presumed to use 3,4-dihydroxy-L-phenylalanine (L-DOPA) to produce trans-caffeate and NH_{3}. However, the EC number for this purported enzyme was deleted in 2007, as no evidence has emerged for its existence.

=== Biotransformation ===
Caffeate O-methyltransferase is an enzyme responsible for the transformation of caffeic acid into ferulic acid.

Caffeic acid and related o-diphenols are rapidly oxidized by o-diphenol oxidases in tissue extracts.

=== Biodegradation ===
Caffeate 3,4-dioxygenase is an enzyme that uses caffeic acid and oxygen to produce 3-(2-carboxyethenyl)-cis,cis-muconate.

Caffeic acid is susceptible to autoxidation. Glutathione and thiol compounds (cysteine, thioglycolic acid or thiocresol) or ascorbic acid have a protective effect on browning and disappearance of caffeic acid. This browning is due to the conversion of o-diphenols into reactive o-quinones. Chemical oxidation of caffeic acid in acidic conditions using sodium periodate leads to the formation of dimers with a furan structure (isomers of 2,5-(3′,4′-dihydroxyphenyl)tetrahydrofuran 3,4-dicarboxylic acid). Caffeic acid can also be polymerized using the horseradish peroxidase/H_{2}O_{2} oxidizing system.

== Glycosides ==
3-O-caffeoylshikimic acid (dactylifric acid) and its isomers, are enzymic browning substrates found in dates (Phoenix dactylifera fruits).

== Pharmacology ==
Caffeic acid has a variety of potential pharmacological effects in in vitro studies and in animal models, and the inhibitory effect of caffeic acid on cancer cell proliferation by an oxidative mechanism in the human HT-1080 fibrosarcoma cell line has been established.

Caffeic acid is an antioxidant in vitro and also in vivo. Caffeic acid also shows immunomodulatory and anti-inflammatory activity. Caffeic acid outperformed the other antioxidants, reducing aflatoxin production by more than 95 percent. The studies are the first to show that oxidative stress that would otherwise trigger or enhance Aspergillus flavus aflatoxin production can be stymied by caffeic acid. This opens the door to use as a natural fungicide by supplementing trees with antioxidants.

Caffeic acid is listed under some Hazard Data sheets as a potential carcinogen, as has been listed by the International Agency for Research on Cancer as a Group 2B carcinogen ("possibly carcinogenic to humans").

== Other uses ==
Caffeic acid may be the active ingredient in caffenol, a do-it-yourself black-and-white photographic developer made from instant coffee. The developing chemistry is similar to that of catechol or pyrogallol.

It is also used as a matrix in MALDI mass spectrometry analyses.

== Isomers ==
Isomers with the same molecular formula and in the hydroxycinammic acids family are:

- Umbellic acid (2,4-dihydroxycinnamic acid)
- 2,3-Dihydroxycinnamic acid
- 2,5-Dihydroxycinnamic acid
