= Isoferulic acid =

Names
- IUPAC name (E)-3-(3-Hydroxy-4-methoxyphenyl)prop-2-enoic acid
- Other names Hesperetic acid 3-(3-Hydroxy-4-methoxyphenyl)acrylic acid Hesperetate; Isoferulate

Identifiers
| CAS Number | 537-73-5 |
| 3D model (JSmol) | Interactive image |
| ChEBI | CHEBI:27794 |
| ChemSpider | 643318 |
| ECHA InfoCard | 100.007.889 |
| PubChem CID | 736186 |
| UNII | XSQ2K2G7MC |
| CompTox Dashboard (EPA) | DTXSID901314847 DTXSID501009309, DTXSID901314847 |
- InChI: InChI=1S/C10H10O4/c1-14-9-4-2-7(6-8(9)11)3-5-10(12)13/h2-6,11H,1H3,(H,12,13)/b5-3+ Key: QURCVMIEKCOAJU-HWKANZROSA-N
- SMILES: COC1=C(C=C(C=C1)C=CC(=O)O)O

Properties
| Chemical formula | C_{10}H_{10}O_{4} |
| Molar mass | 194.186 g·mol^{−1} |
- Except where otherwise noted, data are given for materials in their standard state (at 25 °C [77 °F], 100 kPa). Infobox references

Isoferulic acid is a hydroxycinnamic acid, a type of organic compound. It is an isomer of ferulic acid.

== Occurrence in nature ==
Isoferulic acid can be found, amongst other compounds, in Lobelia chinensis.

=== In food ===
Ferulic acid is found in pineapple flesh.
