= Canolol =

Names
- Preferred IUPAC name 4-Ethenyl-2,6-dimethoxyphenol
- Other names 2,6-Dimethoxy-4-vinylphenol; 4-Vinyl-2,6-dimethoxyphenol; 4-Vinylsyringol

Identifiers
CAS Number	28343-22-8
3D model (JSmol)	Interactive image
ChEBI	CHEBI:197097
ChemSpider	33074
EC Number	848-947-6
PubChem CID	35960
UNII	ZB5OK5EX8B
CompTox Dashboard (EPA)	DTXSID30865427
- InChI: InChI=1S/C10H12O3/c1-4-7-5-8(12-2)10(11)9(6-7)13-3/h4-6,11H,1H2,2-3H3 Key: QHJGZUSJKGVMTF-UHFFFAOYSA-N
- SMILES: C=Cc1cc(OC)c(O)c(OC)c1

Properties
Chemical formula	C_{10}H_{12}O_{3}
Molar mass	180.203 g·mol^{−1}

Hazards
- GHS labelling
Pictograms	(GHS05: Corrosive) (GHS07: Exclamation mark)
Signal word	Danger
Hazard statements	H315, H318, H335
Precautionary statements	P261, P264, P264+P265, P271, P280, P302+P352, P304+P340, P305+P354+P338, P317, P319, P321, P332+P317, P362+P364, P403+P233, P405, P501
- Except where otherwise noted, data are given for materials in their standard state (at 25 °C [77 °F], 100 kPa). Infobox references

Canolol is a phenolic compound found in crude canola oil. It is produced by decarboxylation of sinapic acid during canola seed roasting.

== See also ==
- Phenolic content in wine
- Syringaldehyde
- Syringol
- Syringic acid
- Acetosyringone
- Sinapyl alcohol
- Sinapaldehyde
- Sinapinic acid
- Sinapine
