= M-Coumaric acid =

m-Coumaric acid
- Skeletal formula of m-coumaric acid

Names
- Preferred IUPAC name (2E)-3-(3-Hydroxyphenyl)prop-2-enoic acid
- Other names meta-Coumaric acid 3-Hydroxycinnamic acid

Identifiers
CAS Number	588-30-7
3D model (JSmol)	Interactive image
ChEBI	CHEBI:32357
ChemSpider	553147
ECHA InfoCard	100.008.742
EC Number	209-615-0
KEGG	C12621
PubChem CID	637541
UNII	KWJ2DDJ34H
CompTox Dashboard (EPA)	DTXSID001336224 DTXSID00891551, DTXSID001336224
- InChI: InChI=1S/C9H8O3/c10-8-3-1-2-7(6-8)4-5-9(11)12/h1-6,10H,(H,11,12)/b5-4+ Key: KKSDGJDHHZEWEP-SNAWJCMRSA-N; InChI=1/C9H8O3/c10-8-3-1-2-7(6-8)4-5-9(11)12/h1-6,10H,(H,11,12)/b5-4+ Key: KKSDGJDHHZEWEP-SNAWJCMRBO
- SMILES: C1=CC(=CC(=C1)O)/C=C/C(=O)O

Properties
Chemical formula	C_{9}H_{8}O_{3}
Molar mass	164.16 g/mol
- Except where otherwise noted, data are given for materials in their standard state (at 25 °C [77 °F], 100 kPa). Infobox references

m-Coumaric acid is a hydroxycinnamic acid, an organic compound that is a hydroxy derivative of cinnamic acid. There are three isomers of coumaric acid – o-coumaric acid, m-coumaric acid, and p-coumaric acid – that differ by the position of the hydroxy substitution of the phenyl group.

m-Coumaric acid can be found in vinegar.
