= Dactylifric acid =

Names
- Preferred IUPAC name (3R,4R,5R)-3-{[(2E)-3-(3,4-Dihydroxyphenyl)prop-2-enoyl]oxy}-4,5-dihydroxycyclohex-1-ene-1-carboxylic acid
- Other names Dattelic acid; 5-O-Caffeoylshikimic acid; trans-5-O-Caffeoylshikimic acid; 5-Caffeoylshikimic acid

Identifiers
CAS Number	73263-62-4
3D model (JSmol)	Interactive image
ChEBI	CHEBI:2106
ChemSpider	4445076
PubChem CID	5281762
UNII	5U399BD0RZ
CompTox Dashboard (EPA)	DTXSID501312675
- InChI: InChI=1S/C16H16O8/c17-10-3-1-8(5-11(10)18)2-4-14(20)24-13-7-9(16(22)23)6-12(19)15(13)21/h1-6,12-13,15,17-19,21H,7H2,(H,22,23)/b4-2+/t12-,13-,15-/m1/s1 Key: QMPHZIPNNJOWQI-GDDAOPKQSA-N
- SMILES: C1[C@H]([C@@H]([C@@H](C=C1C(=O)O)O)O)OC(=O)/C=C/C2=CC(=C(C=C2)O)O

Properties
Chemical formula	C_{16}H_{16}O_{8}
Molar mass	336.296 g·mol^{−1}
- Except where otherwise noted, data are given for materials in their standard state (at 25 °C [77 °F], 100 kPa). Infobox references

Dactylifric acid (also known as dattelic acid or 5-O-caffeoylshikimic acid) is an ester derived from caffeic acid and shikimic acid. It and its isomers are enzymic browning substrates found in dates (Phoenix dactylifera fruits).

Some older sources identify dactylifric acid as 3-O-caffeoylshikimic acid.

Chemical structure of 3-O-caffeoylshikimic acid
