= Caffenol =

Photographic developer

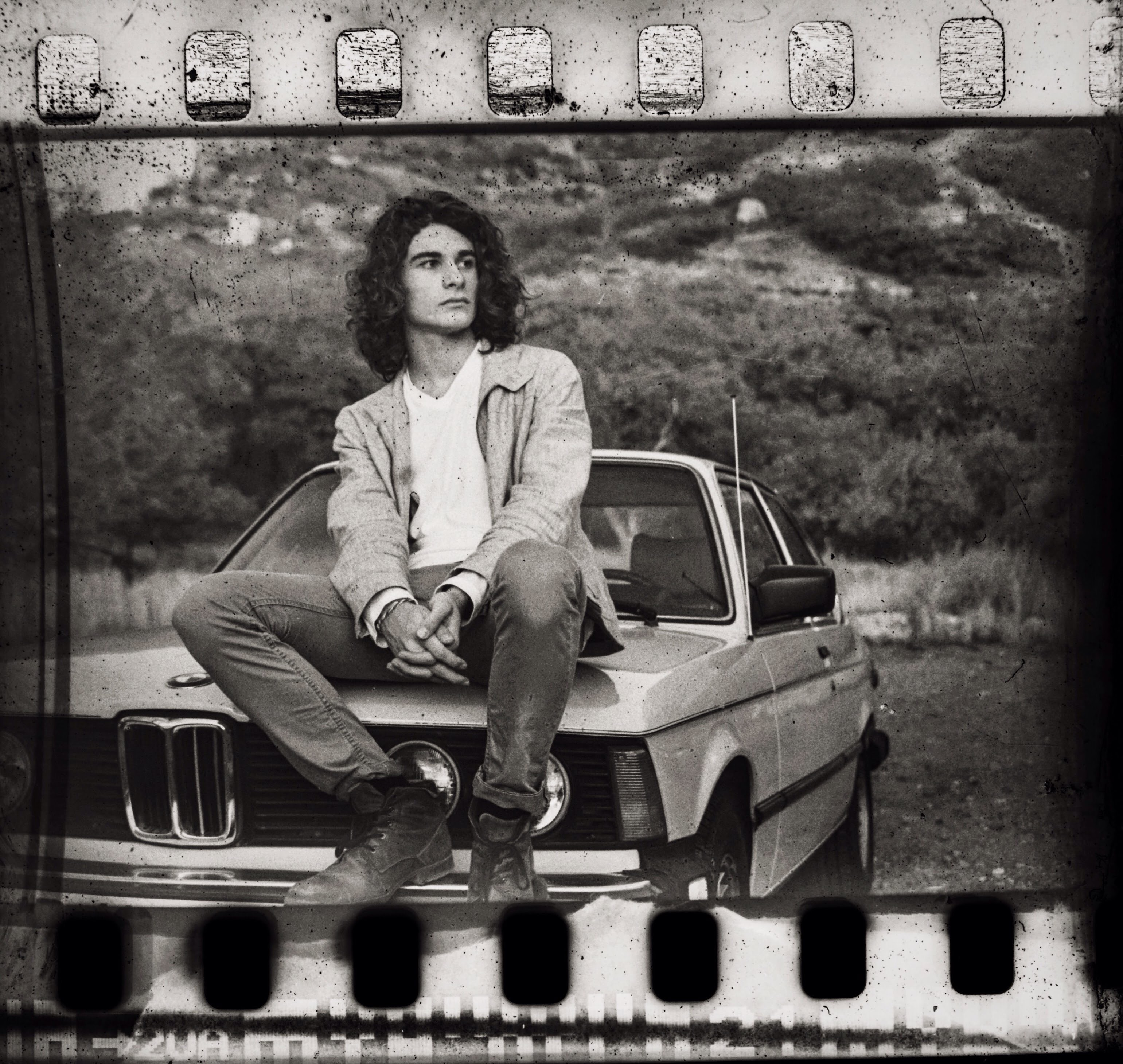
35 mm film developed in caffenol.

Caffenol is a homemade photographic developer, whereby phenols, sodium carbonate and optionally vitamin C are used in aqueous solution for developing film and for printing on paper.

Other basic (as opposed to acidic) chemicals can be used in place of sodium carbonate; however, sodium carbonate is the most common.

There are many formulas for caffenol, all based on preparations that contain caffeic acid (i.e., coffee or tea) and a pH modifier, most often sodium carbonate. The chemistry of caffenol developers is based on the action of the reducing agent caffeic acid, which is chemically unrelated to caffeine.

== History ==
The 1995 technical photographic chemistry class at Rochester Institute of Technology, led by Scott Williams, developed a method of developing photographic film using standard household items. They tested mixtures of tea and coffee combined with agents to balance the pH and successfully made printable images for exposed film.

Since then, the process has successfully been adapted for beer, red wine, and infusions with polyphenol-rich foods, such as cloves, rosemary, and mesquite seed pods.
