= Sinapoylglucose—malate O-sinapoyltransferase =

Sinapoylglucose-malate O-sinapoyltransferase

Identifiers
- EC no.: 2.3.1.92
- CAS no.: 76095-65-3

Databases
- IntEnz: IntEnz view
- BRENDA: BRENDA entry
- ExPASy: NiceZyme view
- KEGG: KEGG entry
- MetaCyc: metabolic pathway
- PRIAM: profile
- PDB structures: RCSB PDB PDBe PDBsum
- Gene Ontology: AmiGO / QuickGO
Search
- PMC: articles
- PubMed: articles
- NCBI: proteins

Sinapoylglucose---malate O-sinapoyltransferase (EC 2.3.1.92) is an enzyme that catalyzes the chemical reaction

1-O-sinapoyl-beta-D-glucose
+
L-malic acid
2-O-sinapoyl malate
+
D-glucose

The two substrates of this enzyme characterised from radish are 1-O-sinapoyl-beta-D-glucose and L-malic acid. Its products are 2-O-sinapoyl malate and D-glucose. Derivatives of sinapinic acid are found widely in brassica.

This enzyme belongs to the family of transferases, specifically those acyltransferases transferring groups other than aminoacyl groups. The systematic name of this enzyme class is 1-O-sinapoyl-beta-D-glucose:(S)-malate O-sinapoyltransferase. Other names in common use include 1-sinapoylglucose-L-malate sinapoyltransferase, and sinapoylglucose:malate sinapoyltransferase.
