= Syringic acid =

- Chemical structure of syringic acid

Names
- Preferred IUPAC name 4-Hydroxy-3,5-dimethoxybenzoic acid
- Other names Gallic acid 3,5-dimethyl ether

Identifiers
CAS Number	530-57-4
3D model (JSmol)	Interactive image
ChEBI	CHEBI:68329
ChEMBL	ChEMBL1414
ChemSpider	10289
ECHA InfoCard	100.007.716
EC Number	208-486-8
KEGG	C10833
PubChem CID	10742
UNII	E390O181H5
CompTox Dashboard (EPA)	DTXSID0060191
- InChI: InChI=1S/C9H10O5/c1-13-6-3-5(9(11)12)4-7(14-2)8(6)10/h3-4,10H,1-2H3,(H,11,12) Key: JMSVCTWVEWCHDZ-UHFFFAOYSA-N
- SMILES: COC1=CC(=CC(=C1O)OC)C(=O)O

Properties
Chemical formula	C_{9}H_{10}O_{5}
Molar mass	198.174 g·mol^{−1}
Melting point	206 to 209

Hazards
- GHS labelling
Pictograms	(GHS07: Exclamation mark)
Signal word	Warning
Hazard statements	H315, H319, H335
Precautionary statements	P261, P264, P264+P265, P271, P280, P302+P352, P304+P340, P305+P351+P338, P319, P321, P332+P317, P337+P317, P362+P364, P403+P233, P405, P501
- Except where otherwise noted, data are given for materials in their standard state (at 25 °C [77 °F], 100 kPa). verify (what is ?) Infobox references

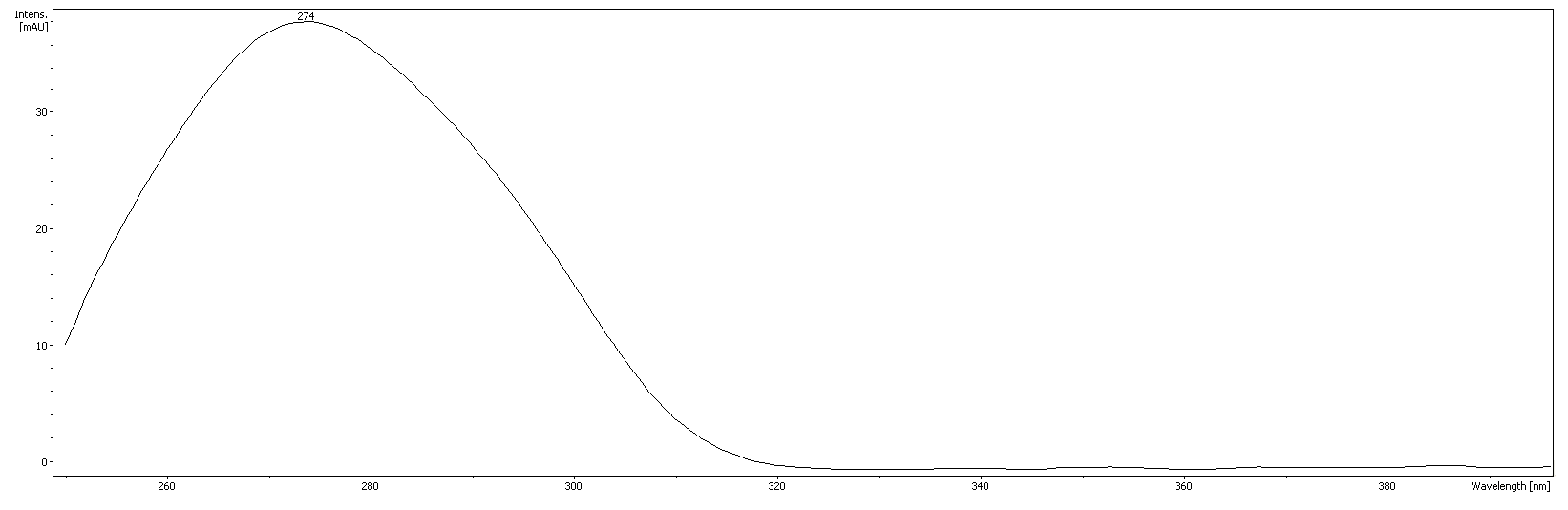
UV visible spectrum of syringic acid.

Syringic acid is a naturally occurring phenolic compound and dimethoxybenzene that is commonly found as a plant metabolite.

== Natural occurrence ==
Syringic acid can be found in several plants including Ardisia elliptica and Schumannianthus dichotomus. It is biosynthesized by the shikimic acid pathway in plants.

== Synthesis ==
Syringic acid can be prepared by selectively hydrolyzing (demethylating) eudesmic acid with 20% sulfuric acid.

=== Presence in food ===
Syringic acid can be found in several consumables including olives, dates, spices, pumpkin, grapes, acai palm, honey, red wine, among others. Its presence in the ancient Egyptian drink shedeh could confirm it was made out of grape, as syringic acid is released by the breakdown of the compound malvidin, also found in red wine. It is also found in vinegar.

== Applications ==
Various studies have found syringic acid to have potentially useful properties as an anti-oxidant, anti-microbial, anti-inflammation, anti-cancer, and anti-diabetic.

Syringic acid has a hepatotoxic effect upon ingestion, and is a skin/eye irritant.

Syringic acid can be enzymatically polymerized. Laccase and peroxidase induced the polymerization of syringic acid to give a poly(1,4-phenylene oxide) bearing a carboxylic acid at one end and a phenolic hydroxyl group at the other.

== See also ==
- Phenolic content in wine
- Syringol
- Syringaldehyde
- Acetosyringone
- Sinapyl alcohol
- Sinapinic acid
- Sinapaldehyde
- Sinapine
- Canolol
