= Acetosyringone =

Chemical compound

- Chemical structure of acetosyringone

Names
- Preferred IUPAC name 1-(4-Hydroxy-3,5-dimethoxyphenyl)ethan-1-one
- Other names: Acetosyringenin; Acetosyringon; 4-acetylsyringol

Identifiers
CAS Number	2478-38-8
3D model (JSmol)	Interactive image; Interactive image
ChEBI	CHEBI:2404
ChEMBL	ChEMBL224146
ChemSpider	16280
ECHA InfoCard	100.017.828
PubChem CID	17198
UNII	866P45Y84S
CompTox Dashboard (EPA)	DTXSID2062454
- InChI: InChI=1S/C10H12O4/c1-6(11)7-4-8(13-2)10(12)9(5-7)14-3/h4-5,12H,1-3H3 Key: OJOBTAOGJIWAGB-UHFFFAOYSA-N
- SMILES: CC(=O)C1=CC(=C(C(=C1)OC)O)OC; O=C(c1cc(OC)c(O)c(OC)c1)C

Properties
Chemical formula	C_{10}H_{12}O_{4}
Molar mass	196.202 g·mol^{−1}
Appearance	white to brown solid
Melting point	125.5 °C (257.9 °F; 398.6 K)
Boiling point	335 °C (635 °F; 608 K)

Hazards
- GHS labelling
Pictograms	(GHS07: Exclamation mark)
Signal word	Warning
Hazard statements	H315, H319, H335
Precautionary statements	P261, P264, P264+P265, P271, P280, P302+P352, P304+P340, P305+P351+P338, P319, P321, P332+P317, P337+P317, P362+P364, P403+P233, P405, P501
- Except where otherwise noted, data are given for materials in their standard state (at 25 °C [77 °F], 100 kPa). verify (what is ?) Infobox references

Acetosyringone is a phenolic natural product and a chemical compound related to acetophenone and 2,6-dimethoxyphenol. It was first described in relation to lignan/phenylpropanoid-type phytochemicals, with isolation from a variety of plant sources, in particular, in relation to wounding and other physiologic changes.

== Occurrence and biological role ==
Historically, this substance has been best known for its involvement in plant-pathogen recognition, especially its role as a signal attracting and transforming unique, oncogenic bacteria in genus Agrobacterium. The virA gene on the Ti plasmid of Agrobacterium tumefaciens and the Ri plasmid of Agrobacterium rhizogenes is used by these soil bacteria to infect plants, via its encoding for a receptor for acetosyringone and other phenolic phytochemicals exuded by plant wounds. This compound also allows higher transformation efficiency in plants, as shown in A. tumefaciens-mediated transformation procedures, and so is of importance in plant biotechnology.

Acetosyringone can also be found in Posidonia oceanica and a wide variety of other plants. It is secreted at wounded sites of dicotyledons. This compound enhances the Agrobacterium-mediated gene transformation in dicots. Monocotyledons lack this wound response, which is considered the limiting factor in Agrobacterium-mediated gene transformation in monocots.

The compound is also produced by the male leaffooted bug (Leptoglossus phyllopus) and used in its communication system.

In vitro studies show that acetosyringone increases mycorrhizae formation in the fungus Glomus intraradices.

A total synthesis of this simple natural product was performed by Crawford et al. in 1956, but is of limited contemporary synthetic interest. A variety of acetosyringone analogues are available, including some which are covalent inactivators of cellular processes that involve acetosyringone.

== Chemical characteristics ==
Acetosyringone does not dissolve well in water. Although it has a melting point of about 125 degree Celsius, it is not wise to autoclave acetosyringone along with the medium used for (for example) plant infiltration by microbes.

== See also ==
- Phenolic content in wine
- Syringol
- Syringic acid
- Syringaldehyde
- Sinapyl alcohol
- Sinapinic acid
- Sinapaldehyde
- Sinapine
- Canolol
