= Caffeic acid phenethyl ester =

Names
- Preferred IUPAC name 2-Phenylethyl (2E)-3-(3,4-dihydroxyphenyl)prop-2-enoate
- Other names Phenylethyl caffeate; Phenethyl caffeate; Caffeic acid 2-phenylethyl ester; β-Phenylethyl caffeate

Identifiers
CAS Number	104594-70-9
3D model (JSmol)	Interactive image
Abbreviations	CAPE
ChEBI	CHEBI:8062
ChemSpider	4445100
ECHA InfoCard	100.155.538
PubChem CID	5281787
UNII	G960R9S5SK
CompTox Dashboard (EPA)	DTXSID80861176 DTXSID8040987, DTXSID80861176
- InChI: InChI=1S/C17H16O4/c18-15-8-6-14(12-16(15)19)7-9-17(20)21-11-10-13-4-2-1-3-5-13/h1-9,12,18-19H,10-11H2/b9-7+ Key: SWUARLUWKZWEBQ-VQHVLOKHSA-N; InChI=1/C17H16O4/c18-15-8-6-14(12-16(15)19)7-9-17(20)21-11-10-13-4-2-1-3-5-13/h1-9,12,18-19H,10-11H2/b9-7+ Key: SWUARLUWKZWEBQ-VQHVLOKHBT
- SMILES: O=C(OCCc1ccccc1)\C=C\c2cc(O)c(O)cc2

Properties
Chemical formula	C_{17}H_{16}O_{4}
Molar mass	284.311 g·mol^{−1}
- Except where otherwise noted, data are given for materials in their standard state (at 25 °C [77 °F], 100 kPa). Infobox references

Caffeic acid phenethyl ester (CAPE) is a natural phenolic chemical compound. It is the ester of caffeic acid and phenethyl alcohol.

== Natural occurrences ==
CAPE is found in a variety of plants. It is also a component of propolis from honeybee hives.

== Potential pharmacology ==
A variety of in vitro pharmacology and effects in animal models have been reported for CAPE, but their clinical significance is unknown. It has antimitogenic, anticarcinogenic, anti-inflammatory, and immunomodulatory properties in vitro. Another study also showed that CAPE suppresses acute immune and inflammatory responses in vitro. This anti-cancer effect was also seen when mice skin was treated with bee propolis and exposed to TPA, a chemical that induced skin papillomas. CAPE significantly reduced the number of papillomas.

Recent study suggest that CAPE can also help in reducing oxidative stress caused by traumatic brain injury.
