= Syringol =

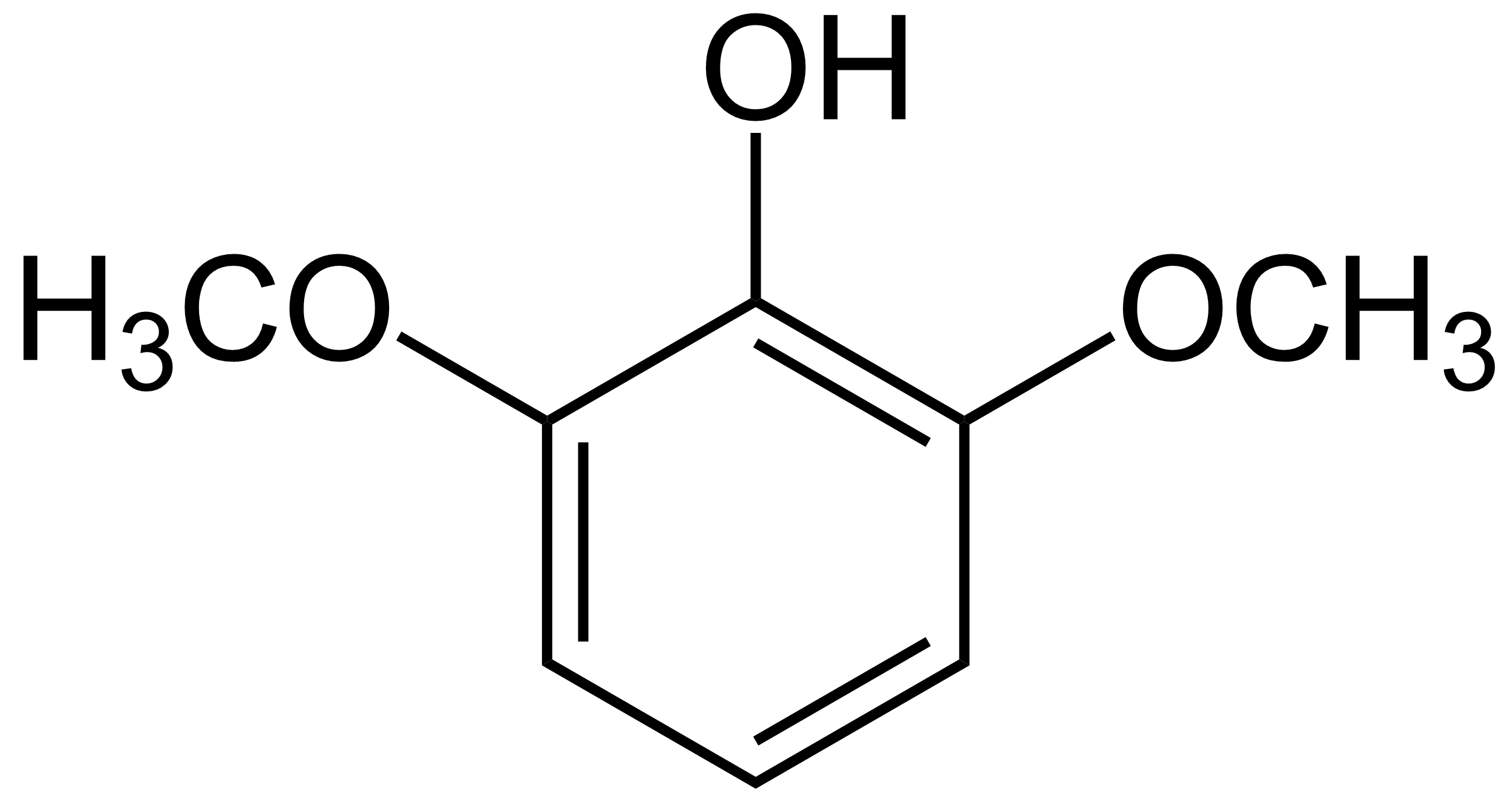
- Syringol

Names
- Preferred IUPAC name 2,6-Dimethoxyphenol
- Other names Syringol; 2-Hydroxy-1,3-dimethoxybenzene; Pyrogallol 1,3-dimethyl ether

Identifiers
CAS Number	91-10-1
3D model (JSmol)	Interactive image
Beilstein Reference	1526871
ChEBI	CHEBI:955
ChEMBL	ChEMBL109652
ChemSpider	6774
ECHA InfoCard	100.001.856
EC Number	202-041-1
PubChem CID	7041
UNII	4UQT464H8K
CompTox Dashboard (EPA)	DTXSID2052607
- InChI: InChI=1S/C8H10O3/c1-10-6-4-3-5-7(11-2)8(6)9/h3-5,9H,1-2H3 Key: KLIDCXVFHGNTTM-UHFFFAOYSA-N; InChI=1/C8H10O3/c1-10-6-4-3-5-7(11-2)8(6)9/h3-5,9H,1-2H3 Key: KLIDCXVFHGNTTM-UHFFFAOYAG
- SMILES: O(c1cccc(OC)c1O)C

Properties
Chemical formula	C_{8}H_{10}O_{3}
Molar mass	154.16 g/mol
Appearance	colorless solid
Density	1.15857 g/cm^{3} (60 °C)
Melting point	50 to 57 °C (122 to 135 °F; 323 to 330 K)
Boiling point	262 °C (504 °F; 535 K)
Solubility in water	Slightly soluble
Vapor pressure	15.8 Pa (60 °C)

Hazards
Flash point	140 °C (284 °F; 413 K)
- Except where otherwise noted, data are given for materials in their standard state (at 25 °C [77 °F], 100 kPa). verify (what is ?) Infobox references

Syringol is the organic compound with the formula HO(CH_{3}O)_{2}C_{6}H_{3}. The molecule is a phenol, with methoxy groups in the flanking (2 and 6) positions. It is the symmetrically dimethylated derivative of pyrogallol. It is a colorless solid, although typical samples are brown owing to air-oxidized impurities. Together with guaiacol, syringol and its derivatives are produced by the pyrolysis of lignin. Specifically, syringol is derived from the thermal decomposition of the sinapyl alcohol component. As such, syringol is a main component of wood smoke.

== Syringyl/guaiacyl ratio ==
Lignin, comprising a major fraction of biomass, is sometimes classified according to the syringyl component. Pyrolysis of lignin derived from sinapyl alcohol affords syringol. The conversion involves replacement of the propenyl alcohol substituent of the sinapyl alcohol by hydrogen. A high syringyl (or S) content is indicative of lignin from angiosperms. In contrast, pyrolysis of lignin from gymnosperms gives more guaiacol, resulting from conversion of coniferyl alcohol. These lignins have a high guaiacyl (or G) content.

== Food preparation ==
In preparation of food by smoking, syringol is the main chemical responsible for the smoky aroma, while guaiacol contributes mainly to taste. Artificial liquid or solid smoke flavorings also contain these chemicals, on average composing 13.73% and 13.42% of those products by mass respectively.

== Chemical feedstock ==
Pyrolysis oil, a biofuel derived from woody biomass, can be optimized to yield syringol as a byproduct, potentially competing with petroleum-derived phenols. Some studies indicate that syringol can substitute for phenol formaldehyde resin, a commonly used, water resistant adhesive for plywood.

== See also ==
- Phenolic content in wine
- Syringaldehyde
- Syringic acid
- Acetosyringone
- Sinapaldehyde
- Sinapinic acid
- Sinapine
- Canolol
