= Sinapoylglucose—choline O-sinapoyltransferase =

Sinapoylglucose-choline O-sinapoyltransferase

Identifiers
- EC no.: 2.3.1.91
- CAS no.: 85205-00-1

Databases
- IntEnz: IntEnz view
- BRENDA: BRENDA entry
- ExPASy: NiceZyme view
- KEGG: KEGG entry
- MetaCyc: metabolic pathway
- PRIAM: profile
- PDB structures: RCSB PDB PDBe PDBsum
- Gene Ontology: AmiGO / QuickGO
Search
- PMC: articles
- PubMed: articles
- NCBI: proteins

Sinapoylglucose---choline O-sinapoyltransferase (EC 2.3.1.91) is an enzyme that catalyzes the chemical reaction

1-O-sinapoyl-beta-D-glucose
+
choline
sinapine
+
D-glucose

This is the final step in the biosynthesis of sinapine. The enzyme characterised from Raphanus sativus and Sinapis alba converts 1-O-sinapoyl-beta-D-glucose and choline to the product. It is also found in Brassica napus

This enzyme belongs to the family of transferases, specifically those acyltransferases transferring groups other than aminoacyl groups. The systematic name of this enzyme class is 1-O-(4-hydroxy-3,5-dimethoxycinnamoyl)-beta-D-glucose:choline 1-O-(4-hydroxy-3,5-dimethoxycinnamoyl)transferase. This enzyme is also called sinapine synthase.
