= HT1080 =

Fibrosarcoma cell line

HT1080 is a fibrosarcoma cell line which has been used extensively in biomedical research. The cell line was created from tissue taken in a biopsy of a fibrosarcoma present in a 35-year-old human male. The patient who supplied the sample had not undergone radio or chemotherapy, making it less likely that unwanted mutations were introduced into the cell line.

The cell line carries an IDH1 mutation and an activated N-ras oncogene.
