= Difenoxuron =

Names
- IUPAC name 3-[4-(4-Methoxyphenoxy)phenyl]-1,1-dimethylurea
- Other names N′-[4-(4-methoxyphenoxy)phenyl]-N,N-dimethylurea; Lironion

Identifiers
CAS Number	14214-32-5
3D model (JSmol)	Interactive image
ChemSpider	24757
ECHA InfoCard	100.034.592
EC Number	238-068-0
PubChem CID	26576
UNII	C74279E50O
CompTox Dashboard (EPA)	DTXSID9041863
- InChI: InChI=1S/C16H18N2O3/c1-18(2)16(19)17-12-4-6-14(7-5-12)21-15-10-8-13(20-3)9-11-15/h4-11H,1-3H3,(H,17,19) Key: AMVYOVYGIJXTQB-UHFFFAOYSA-N
- SMILES: CN(C)C(=O)NC1=CC=C(C=C1)OC2=CC=C(C=C2)OC

Properties
Chemical formula	C_{16}H_{18}N_{2}O_{3}
Molar mass	286.331 g·mol^{−1}
Appearance	Solid white powder
Density	1300 kg/m^{3}
Melting point	139 °C (282 °F; 412 K)
Solubility	Soluble in acetone

Hazards
NFPA 704 (fire diamond)	0 0 0
- Lethal dose or concentration (LD, LC)
LD_{50} (median dose)	>7750 mg/kg (rat, oral); 2150 mg/kg (rat, dermal)
Safety data sheet (SDS)	http://cdn.chemservice.com/product/msdsnew/External/English/N-12977%20English%20SDS%20US.pdf
- Except where otherwise noted, data are given for materials in their standard state (at 25 °C [77 °F], 100 kPa). Infobox references

Difenoxuron (commercially known as Lironion) is a phenylurea herbicide used to control annual broad-leaved weeds and grasses in allium crops (predominantly onions), carrots, jojoba, and celery.

== Production ==
Difenoxuron may be synthesized from 4-chloroaniline, 4-methoxyphenol, dimethylamine, and phosgene. It is stereochemically achiral.

== Mechanism of action ==
Difenoxuron is a member of the phenylurea class of herbicides. Phenylureas inhibit photosynthesis at photosystem II by binding to the serine 264 residue of the D1 protein, occupying the Qb (secondary plastoquinone) binding site and hence halting electron transfer from the primary acceptor Qa to the secondary acceptor Qb. This prevents CO_{2} fixation and energy production. Moreover, this blockade prevents chlorophyll from transferring energy to Qa, increasing production of triplet-state chlorophyll, which reacts with molecular oxygen to form singlet oxygen, a highly reactive species that oxidatively damages the pigments, lipids and proteins of the photosynthetic thylakoid membrane.

== Herbicidal activity ==
Liming in Boddington soil has been shown by a 1976 study to increase the herbicidal toxicity of difenoxuron by two to three times compared to soil without the additional level of liming.

== Toxicology ==
Difenoxuron's hazards include acute toxicity caused by oral ingestion, and acute toxicity of inhalation. There are very few studies about the genotoxicity of difenoxuron and these studies are inconcordant but there appears to be a dose dependent relationship between the concentration of difenoxuron and rate of observed chromosomal aberrations.
