= Hydroxymethylphenol =

Hydroxymethylphenol may refer to:

- Gastrodigenin (4-hydroxymethylphenol)
- Salicyl alcohol (2-hydroxymethylphenol)
