= Syringaldehyde =

Names
- Preferred IUPAC name 4-Hydroxy-3,5-dimethoxybenzaldehyde
- Other names 3,5-Dimethoxy-4-hydroxybenzene carbonal, Gallaldehyde 3,5-dimethyl ether, 4-Hydroxy-3,5-dimethoxybenzaldehyde, Syringic aldehyde

Identifiers
CAS Number	134-96-3
3D model (JSmol)	Interactive image
ChEBI	CHEBI:67380
ChEMBL	ChEMBL225303
ChemSpider	8333
ECHA InfoCard	100.004.698
EC Number	205-167-5
PubChem CID	8655
RTECS number	CU5760000
UNII	2ZR01KTT21
CompTox Dashboard (EPA)	DTXSID2059643
- InChI: InChI=1S/C9H10O4/c1-12-7-3-6(5-10)4-8(13-2)9(7)11/h3-5,11H,1-2H3 Key: KCDXJAYRVLXPFO-UHFFFAOYSA-N; InChI=1/C9H10O4/c1-12-7-3-6(5-10)4-8(13-2)9(7)11/h3-5,11H,1-2H3 Key: KCDXJAYRVLXPFO-UHFFFAOYAW
- SMILES: COc1cc(cc(c1O)OC)C=O

Properties
Chemical formula	C_{9}H_{10}O_{4}
Molar mass	182.17 g/mol
Appearance	colorless solid
Density	1.01 g/cm^{3}
Melting point	110 to 113 °C (230 to 235 °F; 383 to 386 K)
Boiling point	192 to 193 °C (378 to 379 °F; 465 to 466 K) at 19 kPa
Solubility in water	Insoluble

Hazards
- GHS labelling
Pictograms	(GHS07: Exclamation mark)
Signal word	Warning
Hazard statements	H302, H315, H319, H335
Precautionary statements	P261, P264, P270, P271, P280, P301+P312, P302+P352, P304+P340, P305+P351+P338, P312, P330, P332+P313, P337+P313, P362, P403+P233, P405, P501
NFPA 704 (fire diamond)	1 0 0
Flash point	> 110 °C (230 °F; 383 K) c.c.
Safety data sheet (SDS)	External MSDS
- Except where otherwise noted, data are given for materials in their standard state (at 25 °C [77 °F], 100 kPa). verify (what is ?) Infobox references

Syringaldehyde is an organic compound that occurs in trace amounts widely in nature. Some species of insects use syringaldehyde in their chemical communication systems. Scolytus multistriatus uses it as a signal to find a host tree during oviposition.

Because it contains many functional groups, it can be classified in many ways - aromatic, aldehyde, phenol. It is a colorless solid (impure samples appear yellowish) that is soluble in alcohol and polar organic solvents.

== Natural sources ==
Syringaldehyde can be found naturally in the wood of spruce and maple trees.

Syringaldehyde is also formed in oak barrels and extracted into whisky, which it gives spicy, smoky, hot and smoldering wood aromas.

== Preparation ==
This compound may be prepared from syringol by the Duff reaction:

== See also ==
- Phenolic content in wine
- Syringol
- Syringic acid
- Acetosyringone
- Sinapyl alcohol
- Sinapinic acid
- Sinapaldehyde
- Sinapine
- Canolol
