= Coumaric acid =

Coumaric acid is a phenolic derivative of cinnamic acid having a hydroxy group as substituent at one of the aromatic positions:

- o-Coumaric acid (ortho-coumaric acid)
- m-Coumaric acid (meta-coumaric acid)
- p-Coumaric acid (para-coumaric acid)

== See also ==
- Dihydroxycinnamic acid
- Ortho, meta, and para substitution
