= Phenylmethanediol =

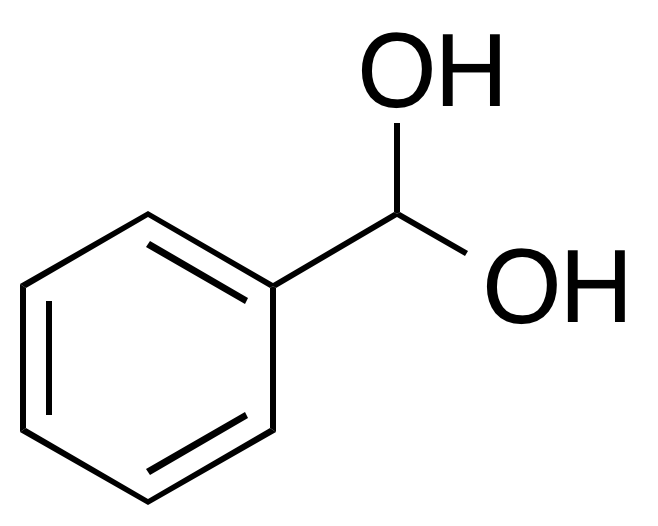

Names
- Preferred IUPAC name Phenylmethanediol
- Other names: hydroxybenzyl alcohol

Identifiers
CAS Number	4403-72-9
3D model (JSmol)	Interactive image
ChemSpider	378535
PubChem CID	427890
CompTox Dashboard (EPA)	DTXSID80330216
- InChI: InChI=1S/C7H8O2/c8-7(9)6-4-2-1-3-5-6/h1-5,7-9H Key: SNGARVZXPNQWEY-UHFFFAOYSA-N
- SMILES: C1=CC=C(C=C1)C(O)O

Properties
Chemical formula	C_{7}H_{8}O_{2}
Molar mass	124.139 g·mol^{−1}
- Except where otherwise noted, data are given for materials in their standard state (at 25 °C [77 °F], 100 kPa). Infobox references

Phenylmethanediol is an organic compound that is a geminal diol, the hydrate of benzaldehyde. It is a short-lived intermediate in some chemical reactions, such as oxidations of toluene and benzaldehyde and the reduction of benzoic acid.
