= 2-Acetyl-5-methylfuran =

Names
- Preferred IUPAC name 1-(5-Methylfuran-2-yl)ethan-1-one
- Other names 1-(5-Methylfuran-2-yl)ethanone; 1-(5-Methyl-2-furyl)ethan-1-one; 1-(5-Methyl-2-furyl)ethanone

Identifiers
CAS Number	1193-79-9
3D model (JSmol)	Interactive image
ChemSpider	13858
ECHA InfoCard	100.013.436
EC Number	214-779-1
PubChem CID	14514
UNII	IY49408H2O
CompTox Dashboard (EPA)	DTXSID70152409
- InChI: InChI=1S/C7H8O2/c1-5-3-4-7(9-5)6(2)8/h3-4H,1-2H3 Key: KEFJLCGVTHRGAH-UHFFFAOYSA-N
- SMILES: CC1=CC=C(O1)C(=O)C

Properties
Chemical formula	C_{7}H_{8}O_{2}
Molar mass	124.139 g·mol^{−1}
Appearance	Yellow-orange liquid
Boiling point	100 °C (212 °F; 373 K) at 33 hPa

Hazards
- Occupational safety and health (OHS/OSH)
Main hazards	Flammable, harmful if swallowed
NFPA 704 (fire diamond)	2 2 0
Flash point	80 °C (176 °F; 353 K)
- Lethal dose or concentration (LD, LC)
LD_{50} (median dose)	438 mg/kg (mouse, oral)
Safety data sheet (SDS)	MSDS
- Except where otherwise noted, data are given for materials in their standard state (at 25 °C [77 °F], 100 kPa). Infobox references

2-Acetyl-5-methylfuran is an organic compound with the chemical formula C_{7}H_{8}O_{2}.
