= Sinapinic acid =

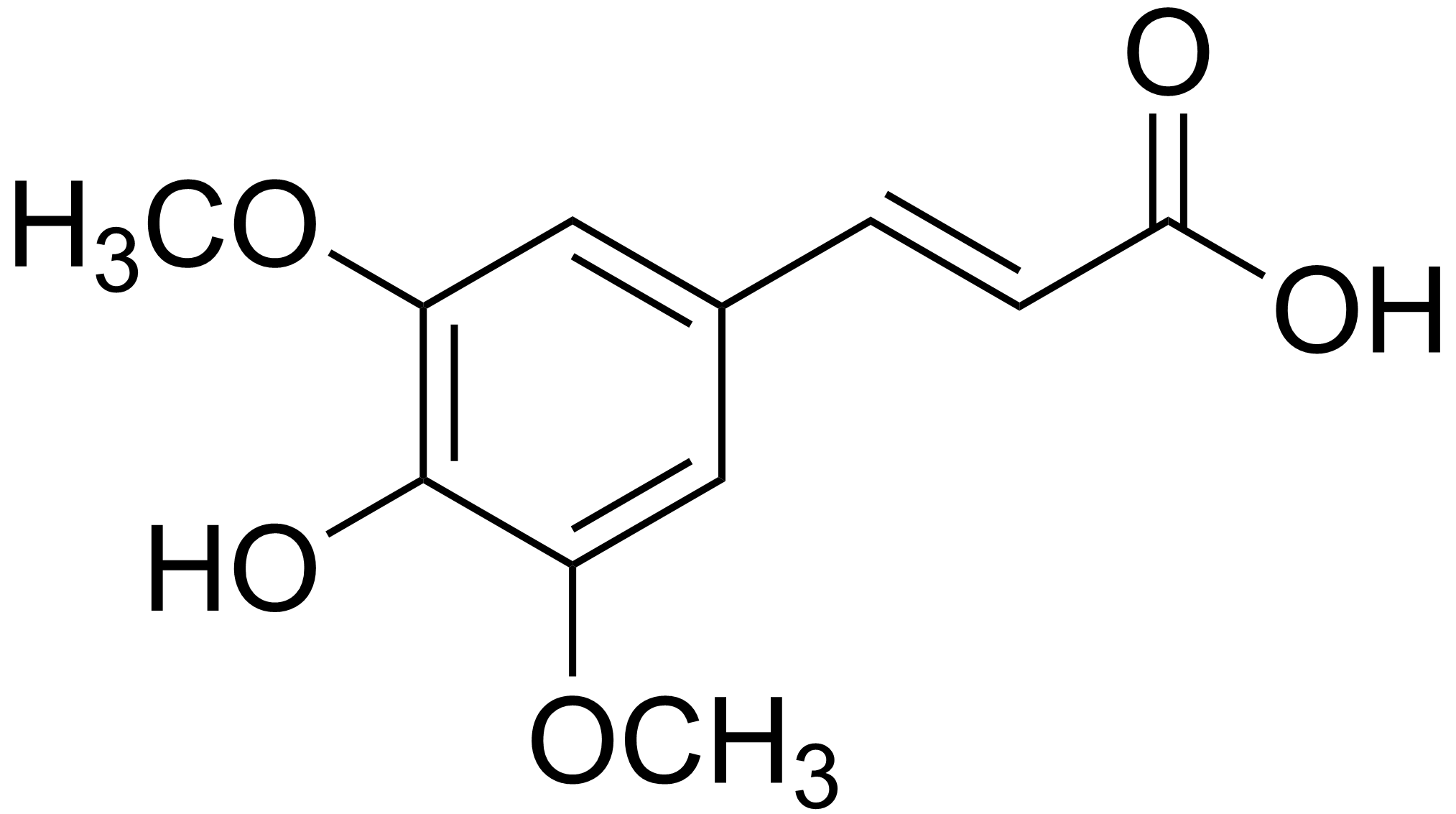
- Sinapinic acid

Names
- Preferred IUPAC name (2E)-3-(4-Hydroxy-3,5-dimethoxyphenyl)prop-2-enoic acid
- Other names Sinapinic acid Sinapic acid 3,5-Dimethoxy-4-hydroxycinnamic acid 4-Hydroxy-3,5-dimethoxycinnamic acid

Identifiers
| CAS Number | 530-59-6 |
| 3D model (JSmol) | Interactive image |
| ChEBI | CHEBI:15714 |
| ChEMBL | ChEMBL109341 |
| ChemSpider | 553361 |
| DrugBank | DB08587 |
| PubChem CID | 637775 |
| UNII | 68A28V6010 |
| CompTox Dashboard (EPA) | DTXSID201355800 DTXSID40862129, DTXSID201355800 |
- InChI: InChI=1S/C11H12O5/c1-15-8-5-7(3-4-10(12)13)6-9(16-2)11(8)14/h3-6,14H,1-2H3,(H,12,13)/b4-3+ Key: PCMORTLOPMLEFB-ONEGZZNKSA-N; InChI=1/C11H12O5/c1-15-8-5-7(3-4-10(12)13)6-9(16-2)11(8)14/h3-6,14H,1-2H3,(H,12,13)/b4-3+ Key: PCMORTLOPMLEFB-ONEGZZNKBS
- SMILES: COc1cc(cc(c1O)OC)/C=C/C(=O)O

Properties
| Chemical formula | C_{11}H_{12}O_{5} |
| Molar mass | 224.21 g/mol |
| Melting point | 203 to 205 °C (397 to 401 °F; 476 to 478 K) (decomposes) |
- Except where otherwise noted, data are given for materials in their standard state (at 25 °C [77 °F], 100 kPa). verify (what is ?) Infobox references

Sinapinic acid, or sinapic acid (Sinapine - Origin: L. Sinapi, sinapis, mustard, Gr., cf. F. Sinapine.) is an organic compound with the formula (CH_{3}O)_{2}(HO)C_{6}H_{2}CH=CHCO_{2}H. It is naturally occurring hydroxycinnamic acid. It is a member of the phenylpropanoid family, which includes many natural products.

== Natural occurrences ==
Sinapic acid is found widely in plants including those used for human nutrition. Some common sinapic acid conjugates include esters with malate and choline (sinapine). For example, it can be found in wine, vinegar, and black plums. Sinapine is found in black mustard seeds. It is considered a choline ester of sinapinic acid.

Sinapic acid has attracted much interest as an antioxidant

Sinapic acid can form dimers with itself (one structure) and ferulic acid (three different structures) in cereal cell walls and therefore may have a similar influence on cell-wall structure to that of the diferulic acids.

== Metabolism ==
Sinapate 1-glucosyltransferase is an enzyme that uses UDP-glucose and sinapate to produce UDP and 1-sinapoyl-D-glucose.

Sinapoylglucose—malate O-sinapoyltransferase is an enzyme that uses 1-O-sinapoyl-beta-D-glucose and (S)-malate to produce D-glucose and sinapoyl-(S)-malate.

== Related compounds ==
Canolol is a phenolic compound found in crude canola oil. It is produced by decarboxylation of sinapic acid during canola seed roasting.

== Research ==
Sinapic acid is a used in MALDI mass spectrometry. It serves well as a matrix for MALDI due to its ability to absorb laser radiation and to also donate protons (H^{+}) to the analyte of interest.

== See also ==
- Phenolic content in wine
- Syringaldehyde
- Syringol
- Syringic acid
- Acetosyringone
- Sinapyl alcohol
- Sinapaldehyde
- Sinapine
- Canolol
