= Sinapine =

- Chemical structure of sinapine

Names
- Preferred IUPAC name 2-{[(2E)-3-(4-Hydroxy-3,5-dimethoxyphenyl)prop-2-enoyl]oxy}-N,N,N-trimethylethan-1-aminium
- Other names Sinapoylcholine; Sinapic acid choline ester

Identifiers
| CAS Number | 18696-26-9 |
| 3D model (JSmol) | Interactive image |
| ChemSpider | 80576 |
| PubChem CID | 5280385 |
| UNII | 09211A0HHL |
| CompTox Dashboard (EPA) | DTXSID10171957 |
- InChI: InChI=1S/C16H23NO5/c1-17(2,3)8-9-22-15(18)7-6-12-10-13(20-4)16(19)14(11-12)21-5/h6-7,10-11H,8-9H2,1-5H3/p+1 Key: HUJXHFRXWWGYQH-UHFFFAOYSA-O
- SMILES: O=C(/C=C/C1=CC(OC)=C(C(OC)=C1)O)OCC[N+](C)(C)C

Properties
| Chemical formula | C_{16}H_{24}NO_{5} |
| Molar mass | 310.370 g·mol^{−1} |
| Melting point | 178 °C (352 °F; 451 K) |
- Except where otherwise noted, data are given for materials in their standard state (at 25 °C [77 °F], 100 kPa). Infobox references

Sinapine is an alkaloidal amine found in some seeds, particularly oil seeds of plants in the family Brassicaceae. It is the choline ester of sinapic acid.

Sinapine was discovered by Étienne-Ossian Henry in 1825.

== Occurrence ==
Sinapine typically occurs in the outer seed coat of oil crops and is plentiful in some types of press cake leftover after vegetable oil extraction. Typical oil seed cake residues high in sinapine include Brassica juncea (1.22% by mass), and rapeseed (0.39-1.06% by mass).

== Isolation ==
The typical protocol for extracting sinapine from seed cakes entails defatting the cake with hexane via a Soxhlet apparatus followed by extraction with 70% methanol held at 75 °C.

== Biosynthesis and metabolism ==
The enzyme sinapoylglucose—choline O-sinapoyltransferase, characterised from radish and white mustard, converts 1-O-sinapoyl-beta-D-glucose and choline to sinapine. The same transformation occurs in rapeseed.

1-O-sinapoyl-beta-D-glucose
+
choline
sinapine
+
D-glucose

The enzyme sinapine esterase from radish can metabolise sinapine by hydrolysis to sinapinic acid and choline:

sinapine
H_{2}O
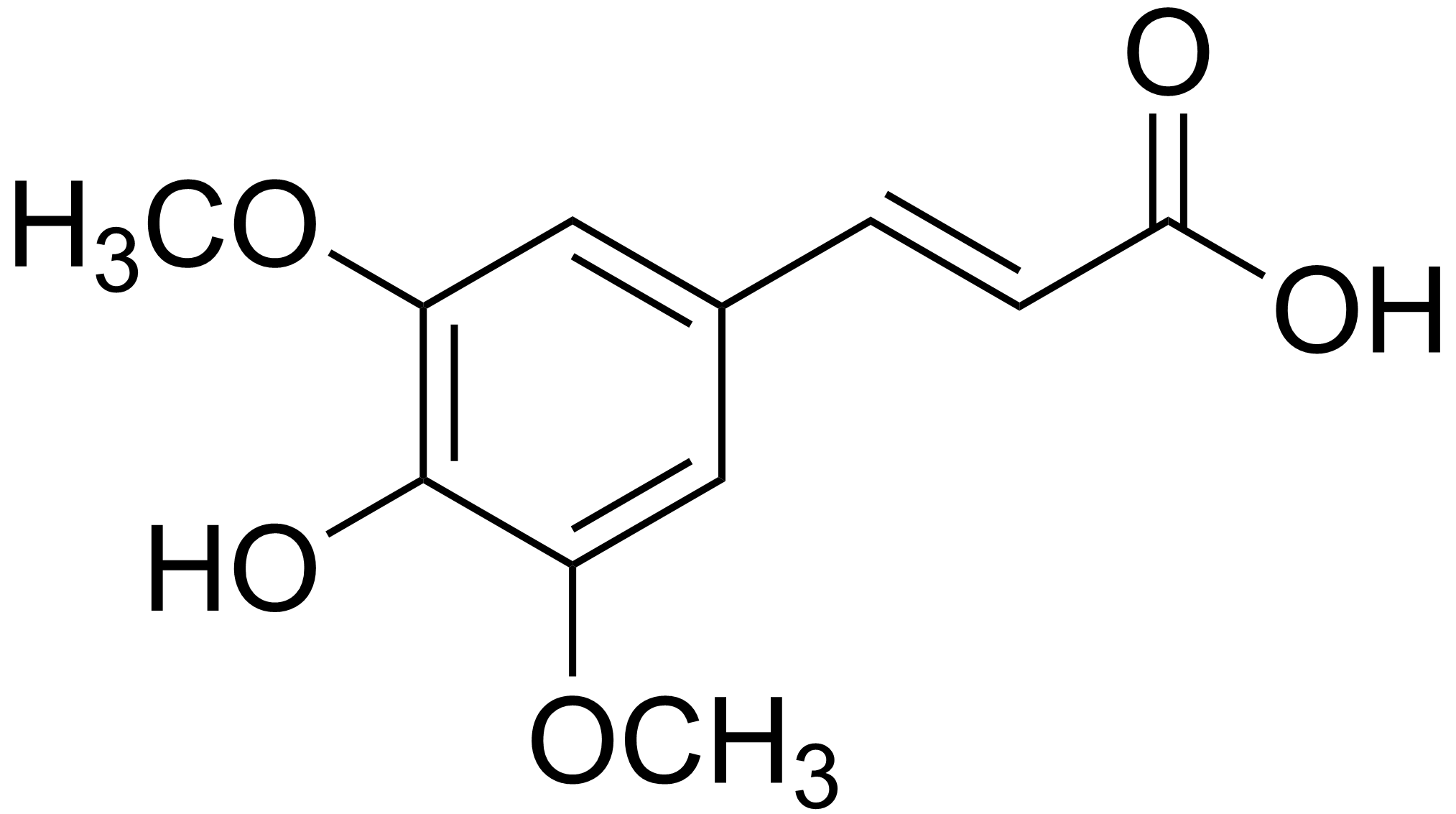
sinapinic acid
+
choline

== See also ==
- Phenolic content in wine
- Syringaldehyde
- Syringol
- Syringic acid
- Acetosyringone
- Sinapyl alcohol
- Sinapaldehyde
- Canolol
