= Methoxyphenol =

Methoxyphenol or hydroxyanisole may refer to:

- 2-Methoxyphenol (guaiacol, o-methoxyphenol, methylcatechol, 2-hydroxyanisole)
- 3-Methoxyphenol (m-methoxyphenol, m-guaiacol, resorcinol monomethyl ether, 3-hydroxyanisole, m-hydroxyanisole)
- 4-Methoxyphenol (mequinol, para-guaiacol, 4-hydroxyanisole)
