= 3,5-Dihydroxycinnamic acid =

Names
- Preferred IUPAC name (2E)-3-(2,4-Dihydroxyphenyl)prop-2-enoic acid

Identifiers
CAS Number	127791-54-2; 28374-93-8 (non-specific)
3D model (JSmol)	Interactive image
ChemSpider	4947733
PubChem CID	6443769
UNII	9PD8QLS6G8
CompTox Dashboard (EPA)	DTXSID301030504
- InChI: InChI=1S/C9H8O4/c10-7-3-6(1-2-9(12)13)4-8(11)5-7/h1-5,10-11H,(H,12,13)/b2-1+ Key: MFFCZSWTQMCKFP-OWOJBTEDSA-N; InChI=1/C9H8O4/c10-7-3-6(1-2-9(12)13)4-8(11)5-7/h1-5,10-11H,(H,12,13)/b2-1+ Key: MFFCZSWTQMCKFP-OWOJBTEDBQ
- SMILES: c1c(cc(cc1O)O)/C=C/C(=O)O

Properties
Chemical formula	C_{9}H_{8}O_{4}
Molar mass	180.159 g·mol^{−1}
- Except where otherwise noted, data are given for materials in their standard state (at 25 °C [77 °F], 100 kPa). Infobox references

3,5-Dihydroxycinnamic acid is a hydroxycinnamic acid. It is an isomer of caffeic acid.

It is a metabolite found in human urine.
