= Caffeate O-methyltransferase =

Enzyme

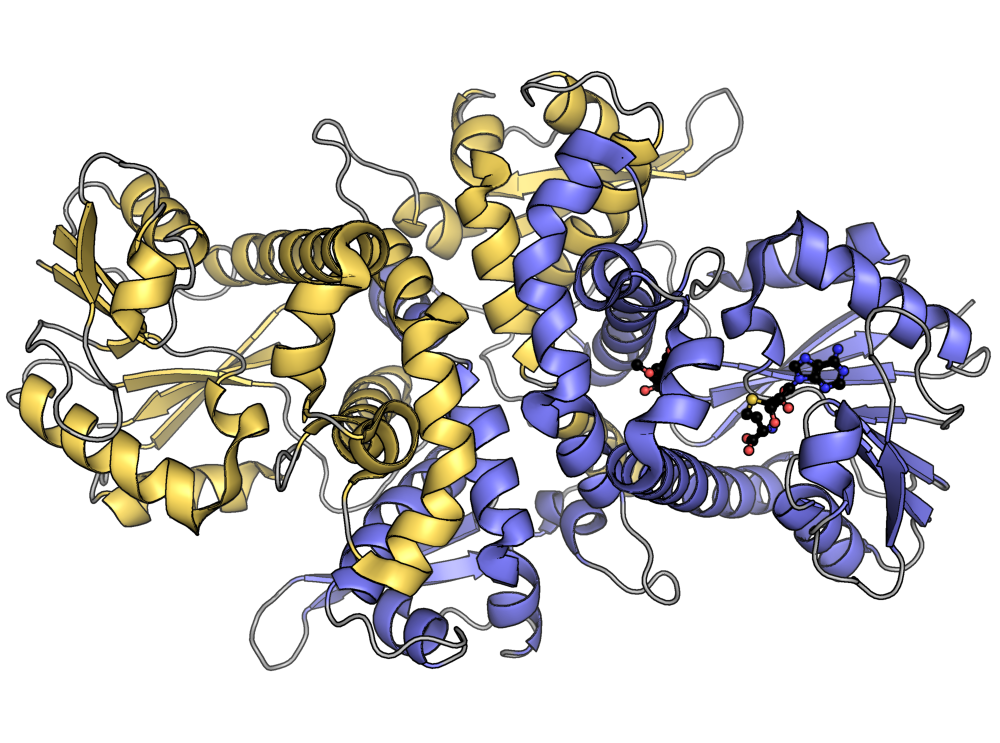
- Alfalfa COMT dimer with bound substrates. PDB: 1KYW

Identifiers
- EC no.: 2.1.1.68
- CAS no.: 50936-45-3

Databases
- IntEnz: IntEnz view
- BRENDA: BRENDA entry
- ExPASy: NiceZyme view
- KEGG: KEGG entry
- MetaCyc: metabolic pathway
- PRIAM: profile
- PDB structures: RCSB PDB PDBe PDBsum
- Gene Ontology: AmiGO / QuickGO
Search
- PMC: articles
- PubMed: articles
- NCBI: proteins

Caffeate O-methyltransferase (EC 2.1.1.68) is an enzyme that catalyzes the chemical reaction

caffeic acid
+ SAM
ferulic acid
+ SAH

This is a methylation reaction in which caffeic acid is converted to ferulic acid. The methyl group comes from the cofactor, S-adenosyl methionine (SAM), which becomes S-adenosyl-L-homocysteine (SAH).

The enzyme belongs to the family of transferases, specifically those transferring one-carbon group methyltransferases. The systematic name of this enzyme class is S-adenosyl-L-methionine:3,4-dihydroxy-trans-cinnamate 3-O-methyltransferase. Other names in common use include caffeate methyltransferase, caffeate 3-O-methyltransferase, and S-adenosyl-L-methionine:caffeic acid-O-methyltransferase. This enzyme participates in phenylpropanoid biosynthesis.

== Structural studies ==
As of late 2007, two structures have been solved for this class of enzymes, with PDB accession codes 1KYW and 1KYZ.
