= 2,5-Dihydroxycinnamic acid =

Names
- Preferred IUPAC name (2E)-3-(2,5-Dihydroxyphenyl)prop-2-enoic acid
- Other names (2E)-3-(2,5-Dihydroxyphenyl)acrylic acid, grevillic acid

Identifiers
CAS Number	38489-67-7; 636-01-1 (non-specific)
3D model (JSmol)	Interactive image
ChemSpider	6442618
PubChem CID	181581
UNII	6EHK92QE99
- InChI: InChI=1S/C9H8O4/c10-7-2-3-8(11)6(5-7)1-4-9(12)13/h1-5,10-11H,(H,12,13) Key: JXIPYOZBOMUUCA-UHFFFAOYSA-N
- SMILES: C1=CC(=C(C=C1O)C=CC(=O)O)O

Properties
Chemical formula	C_{9}H_{8}O_{4}
Molar mass	180.159 g·mol^{−1}
- Except where otherwise noted, data are given for materials in their standard state (at 25 °C [77 °F], 100 kPa). Infobox references

2,5-Dihydroxycinnamic acid is a hydroxycinnamic acid derivative. It is an isomer of caffeic acid.

== Preparation ==
2,5-Dihydroxycinnamic acid is produced by Elbs persulfate oxidation of o-coumaric acid.

== See also ==
- Homogentisic acid
- Gentisic acid
