= Coniferyl aldehyde =

- Chemical structure of trans-coniferyl aldehyde

Names
- IUPAC names (Z)-3-(4-hydroxy-3-methoxyphenyl)prop-2-enal (E)-3-(4-hydroxy-3-methoxyphenyl)prop-2-enal
- Other names coniferaldehyde cis-coniferyl aldehyde trans-coniferyl aldehyde

Identifiers
CAS Number	458-36-6
3D model (JSmol)	Interactive image
ChEBI	CHEBI:16547
ChEMBL	ChEMBL242529
ChemSpider	4444167
ECHA InfoCard	100.006.618
PubChem CID	5352904; 5280536
UNII	06TPT01AD5
CompTox Dashboard (EPA)	DTXSID8075047
- InChI: InChI=1S/C10H10O3/c1-13-10-7-8(3-2-6-11)4-5-9(10)12/h2-7,12H,1H3/b3-2+
- SMILES: COC1=C(C=CC(=C1)C=CC=O)O

Properties
Chemical formula	C_{10}H_{10}O_{3}
Molar mass	178.187 g·mol^{−1}
Density	1.186 g/mL
Melting point	80 °C (176 °F; 353 K)
Boiling point	338.8 °C (641.8 °F; 612.0 K)
- Except where otherwise noted, data are given for materials in their standard state (at 25 °C [77 °F], 100 kPa). Infobox references

Coniferyl aldehyde is an organic compound with the formula HO(CH_{3}O)C_{6}H_{3}CH=CHCHO. It is a derivative of cinnamaldehyde, featuring 4-hydroxy and 3-methoxy substituents. It is a major precursor to lignin.

== Biosynthetic role ==
In sweetgum (Liquidambar styraciflua), coniferyl aldehyde is a precursor to sinapaldehyde via hydroxylation mediated by coniferyl aldehyde 5-hydroxylase.

Coniferyl aldehyde is reduced to coniferyl alcohol by the action of dehydrogenase enzymes.

It is found in Senra incana (Hibisceae). It is a low molecular weight phenol that is susceptible to extraction from cork stoppers into wine.

== See also ==
- Phenolic compounds in wine
