= Mequinol =

Chemical compound

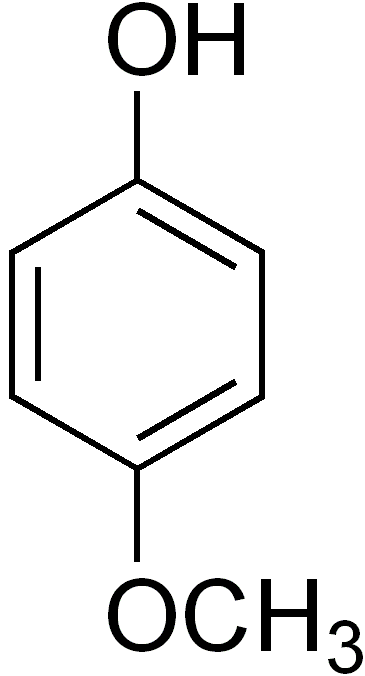

Clinical data
- Other names: 4-Hydroxyanisole; para-Guaiacol
- AHFS/Drugs.com: International Drug Names
- MedlinePlus: a682437
- Routes of administration: Topical
- ATC code: D11AX06 (WHO)

Legal status
- Legal status: CA: Unscheduled; US: ℞-only and Unscheduled; In general: unscheduled

Identifiers
- IUPAC name: 4-Methoxyphenol
- CAS Number: 150-76-5
- PubChem CID: 9015
- IUPHAR/BPS: 6827
- ChemSpider: 8665
- UNII: 6HT8U7K3AM
- KEGG: D04926
- ChEMBL: ChEMBL544
- CompTox Dashboard (EPA): DTXSID4020828
- ECHA InfoCard: 100.005.246

Chemical and physical data
- Formula: C_{7}H_{8}O_{2}
- Molar mass: 124.139 g·mol^{−1}
- Density: 1.55 g/cm^{3}
- Melting point: 52.5 °C (126.5 °F)
- Boiling point: 243 °C (469 °F)
- InChI: InChI=1S/C7H8O2/c1-9-7-4-2-6(8)3-5-7/h2-5,8H,1H3; Key:NWVVVBRKAWDGAB-UHFFFAOYSA-N

Mequinol, MeHQ or 4-methoxyphenol, is an organic compound with the formula CH_{3}OC_{6}H_{4}OH. It is a phenol with a methoxy group in the para position. A colorless solid, it is used in dermatology and organic chemistry.

== Use in dermatology ==
Mequinol is a common active ingredient in topical drugs used for skin depigmentation. As a topical drug mequinol is often mixed with tretinoin, a topical retinoid. A common formulation for this drug is an ethanolic solution of 2% mequinol and 0.01% tretinoin by mass. Dermatologists commonly prescribe the drug to treat liver spots.

Lower dosages of mequinol have been used in conjunction with a Q-switched laser to depigment skin in patients with disseminated idiopathic vitiligo.

== Organic chemistry ==
In organic chemistry 4-methoxyphenol is used as a polymerisation inhibitor (e.g. acrylates or styrene monomers).

4-Methoxyphenol can be produced from p-benzoquinone and methanol via a free radical reaction.

== Applications ==
Some of the known applications of mequinol include in the synthesis of difenoxuron, AH 7725, pemafibrate, tixanox, femoxetine & FG 7080 [100332-17-0].

== Safety ==
The U.S. National Institute for Occupational Safety and Health (NIOSH) has set a recommended exposure limit (REL) of 5 mg/m^{3} over an 8-hour workday.

== See also ==
- Monobenzone (benzyloxyphenol)
- Hydroquinone
- Guaiacol
- 2-Hydroxy-5-methoxybenzaldehyde
