= Sinapyl alcohol =

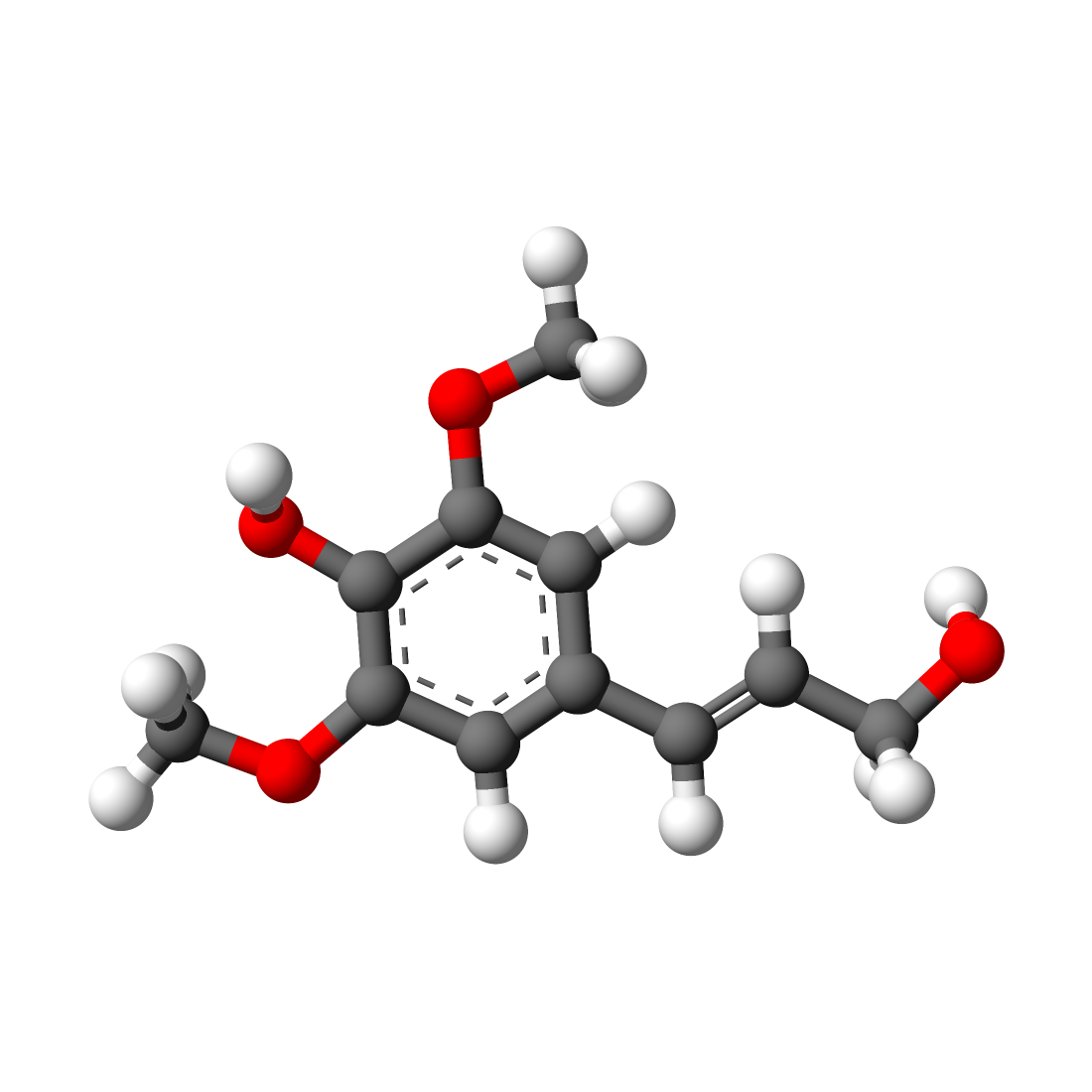

Names
- Preferred IUPAC name 4-[(1E)-3-Hydroxyprop-1-en-1-yl]-2,6-dimethoxyphenol
- Other names Sinapoyl alcohol, 4-Hydroxy-3,5-dimethoxycinnamyl alcohol

Identifiers
CAS Number	537-33-7
3D model (JSmol)	Interactive image
ChEBI	CHEBI:64557
ChemSpider	4444145
ECHA InfoCard	100.190.507
KEGG	C02325
PubChem CID	5280507
UNII	8O6NO04SMV
CompTox Dashboard (EPA)	DTXSID501314695 DTXSID10895025, DTXSID501314695
- InChI: InChI=1S/C11H14O4/c1-14-9-6-8(4-3-5-12)7-10(15-2)11(9)13/h3-4,6-7,12-13H,5H2,1-2H3/b4-3+ Key: LZFOPEXOUVTGJS-ONEGZZNKSA-N
- SMILES: OC/C=C/c1cc(OC)c(O)c(OC)c1

Properties
Chemical formula	C_{11}H_{14}O_{4}
Molar mass	210.226
Appearance	Colourless solid
Melting point	61 to 65 °C (142 to 149 °F; 334 to 338 K)
- Except where otherwise noted, data are given for materials in their standard state (at 25 °C [77 °F], 100 kPa). verify (what is ?) Infobox references

Sinapyl alcohol is an organic compound structurally related to cinnamic acid. It is biosynthetized via the phenylpropanoid biochemical pathway, its immediate precursor being sinapaldehyde. This phytochemical is one of the monolignols, which are precursor to lignin or lignans. It is also a biosynthetic precursor to various stilbenoids and coumarins.

== See also ==
- Sinapinic acid
- Syringol
- Syringaldehyde
- Syringic acid
- Acetosyringone
- Sinapine
- Canolol
- Phenolic content in wine
