= 2,3-Dihydroxycinnamic acid =

Names
- Preferred IUPAC name (2E)-3-(2,3-Dihydroxyphenyl)prop-2-enoic acid
- Other names trans-2,3-Dihydroxycinnamate; 3-(2,3-Dihydroxyphenyl)acrylic acid

Identifiers
CAS Number	31082-90-3
3D model (JSmol)	Interactive image
ChemSpider	4445343
PubChem CID	5282146
UNII	8EU63XMR43
CompTox Dashboard (EPA)	DTXSID601030503
- InChI: InChI=1S/C9H8O4/c10-7-3-1-2-6(9(7)13)4-5-8(11)12/h1-5,10,13H,(H,11,12)/b5-4+ Key: SIUKXCMDYPYCLH-SNAWJCMRSA-N; InChI=1/C9H8O4/c10-7-3-1-2-6(9(7)13)4-5-8(11)12/h1-5,10,13H,(H,11,12)/b5-4+ Key: SIUKXCMDYPYCLH-SNAWJCMRBO
- SMILES: c1cc(c(c(c1)O)O)/C=C/C(=O)O

Properties
Chemical formula	C_{9}H_{8}O_{4}
Molar mass	180.159 g·mol^{−1}
- Except where otherwise noted, data are given for materials in their standard state (at 25 °C [77 °F], 100 kPa). Infobox references

2,3-Dihydroxycinnamic acid is a hydroxycinnamic acid. It is an isomer of caffeic acid.

It is a metabolite found in human urine.
