= Ferulic acid =

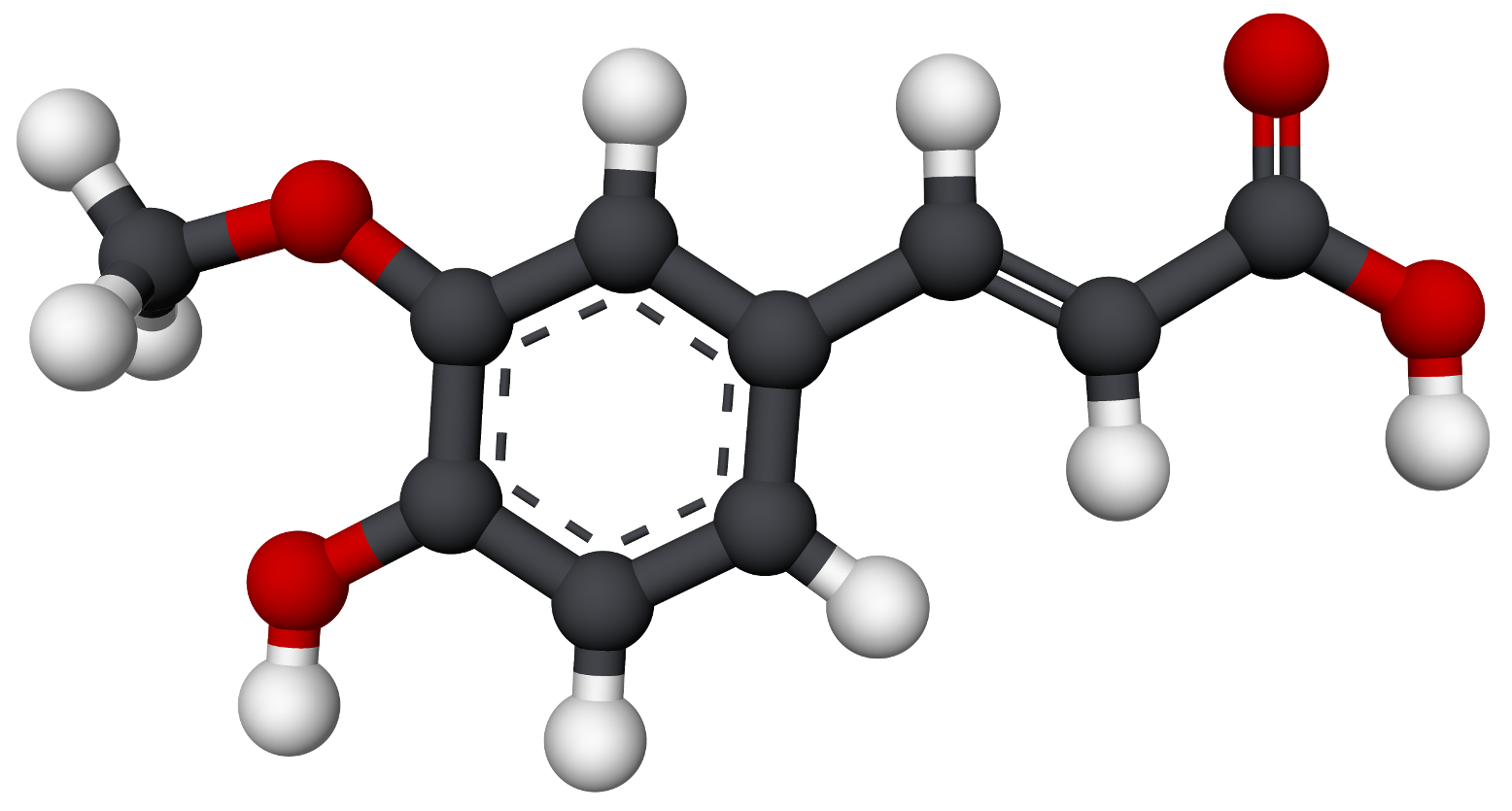

Names
- Preferred IUPAC name (2E)-3-(4-hydroxy-3-methoxyphenyl)prop-2-enoic acid
- Other names 2-propenoic acid, 3-(4-hydroxy-3-methoxyphenyl)- ferulic acid 3-(4-hydroxy-3-methoxyphenyl)-2-propenoic acid 3-(4-hydroxy-3-methoxyphenyl)acrylic acid 3-methoxy-4-hydroxycinnamic acid 4-hydroxy-3-methoxycinnamic acid (2E)-3-(4-hydroxy-3-methoxyphenyl)-2-propenoic acid Coniferic acid trans-ferulic acid (E)-ferulic acid

Identifiers
CAS Number	537-98-4
3D model (JSmol)	Interactive image
ChEBI	CHEBI:17620
ChEMBL	ChEMBL32749
ChemSpider	393368
DrugBank	DB07767
ECHA InfoCard	100.007.892
PubChem CID	445858
UNII	AVM951ZWST
CompTox Dashboard (EPA)	DTXSID70892035 DTXSID5040673, DTXSID70892035
- InChI: InChI=1S/C10H10O4/c1-14-9-6-7(2-4-8(9)11)3-5-10(12)13/h2-6,11H,1H3,(H,12,13)/b5-3+ Key: KSEBMYQBYZTDHS-HWKANZROSA-N; InChI=1/C10H10O4/c1-14-9-6-7(2-4-8(9)11)3-5-10(12)13/h2-6,11H,1H3,(H,12,13)/b5-3+ Key: KSEBMYQBYZTDHS-HWKANZROBE
- SMILES: COc1cc(ccc1O)/C=C/C(=O)O

Properties
Chemical formula	C_{10}H_{10}O_{4}
Molar mass	194.186 g·mol^{−1}
Appearance	Crystalline powder
Melting point	168 to 172 °C (334 to 342 °F; 441 to 445 K)
Solubility in water	0.78 g/L
Acidity (pK_{a})	4.61

Hazards
NFPA 704 (fire diamond)	2 1 0
- Except where otherwise noted, data are given for materials in their standard state (at 25 °C [77 °F], 100 kPa). Infobox references

Ferulic acid is a hydroxycinnamic acid derivative and a phenolic compound. It is an organic compound with the formula (CH_{3}O)HOC_{6}H_{3}CH=CHCO_{2}H. The name is derived from the genus Ferula, referring to the giant fennel (Ferula communis). Classified as a phenolic phytochemical, ferulic acid is an amber colored solid. Esters of ferulic acid are found in plant cell walls, covalently bonded to hemicellulose such as arabinoxylans. Salts and esters derived from ferulic acid are called ferulates.

== Property ==
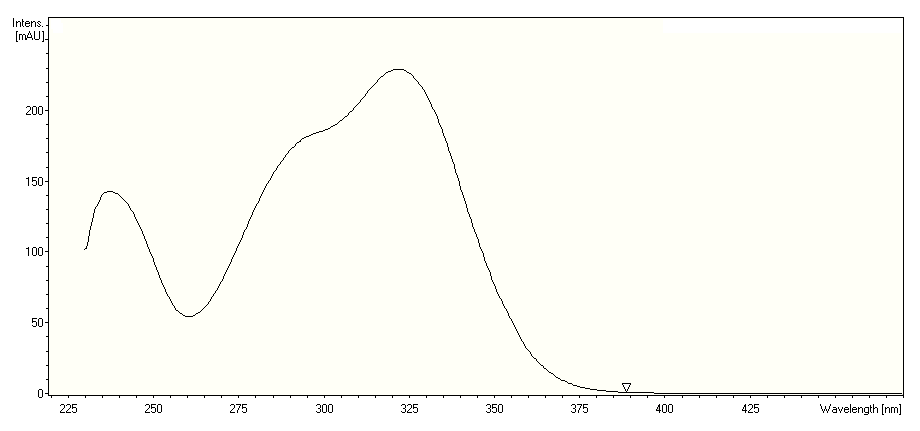
Ultraviolet–visible spectrum of ferulic acid, with λ_{max} at 321 nm and a shoulder at 278 nm

Ferulic acid is a reducing agent. The double bond in the side chain is subjected to cis–trans isomerization, and the resonance stabilized phenoxy radical account for its reduction potential.

== Occurrence ==
=== In plants ===
First separated in Ferula foetida in 1866, ferulic acid is ubiquitous in the plant kingdom, including a number of vegetable sources. It is commonly found in the cell wall of woods, grasses, and corn hulls. They are usually tightly bound to carbohydrates as a glycosidic conjugate, an ester, or an amide. To extract it, one can apply concentrated alkali to the plant tissue.

Asterid eudicot plants can also produce ferulic acid. The tea brewed from the leaves of yacón (Smallanthus sonchifolius), a plant traditionally grown in the northern and central Andes, contains quantities of ferulic acid. In legumes, the white bean variety navy bean is the richest source of ferulic acid among the common bean (Phaseolus vulgaris) varieties. It is also found in horse grams (Macrotyloma uniflorum).

Although there are many sources of ferulic acid in nature, its bioavailability depends on the form in which it is present: free ferulic acid has limited solubility in water, and hence poor bioavailability. In wheat grain, ferulic acid is found bound to cell wall polysaccharides, allowing it to be released and absorbed in the small intestine.

=== In processed foods ===
In cereals, ferulic acid is localized in the bran – the hard outer layer of grain. In wheat, phenolic compounds are mainly found in the form of insoluble bound ferulic acid and may be relevant to resistance to wheat fungal diseases. It can be extracted from wheat bran and maize bran using concentrated alkali.

The highest known concentration of ferulic acid glucoside has been found in flaxseed (4.1±0.2 g/kg). It is also found in barley grain.

Cooking sweetcorn releases increased levels of ferulic acid. As plant sterol esters, this compound is naturally found in rice bran oil, a popular cooking oil in several Asian countries.

Ferulic acid glucoside can be found in commercial breads containing flaxseed. Rye bread contains ferulic acid dehydrodimers.

It occurs in particularly high concentrations in popcorn (0.31% by weight) and bamboo shoots (0.24%), and sugar beat pulp (0.8%).

== Metabolism ==
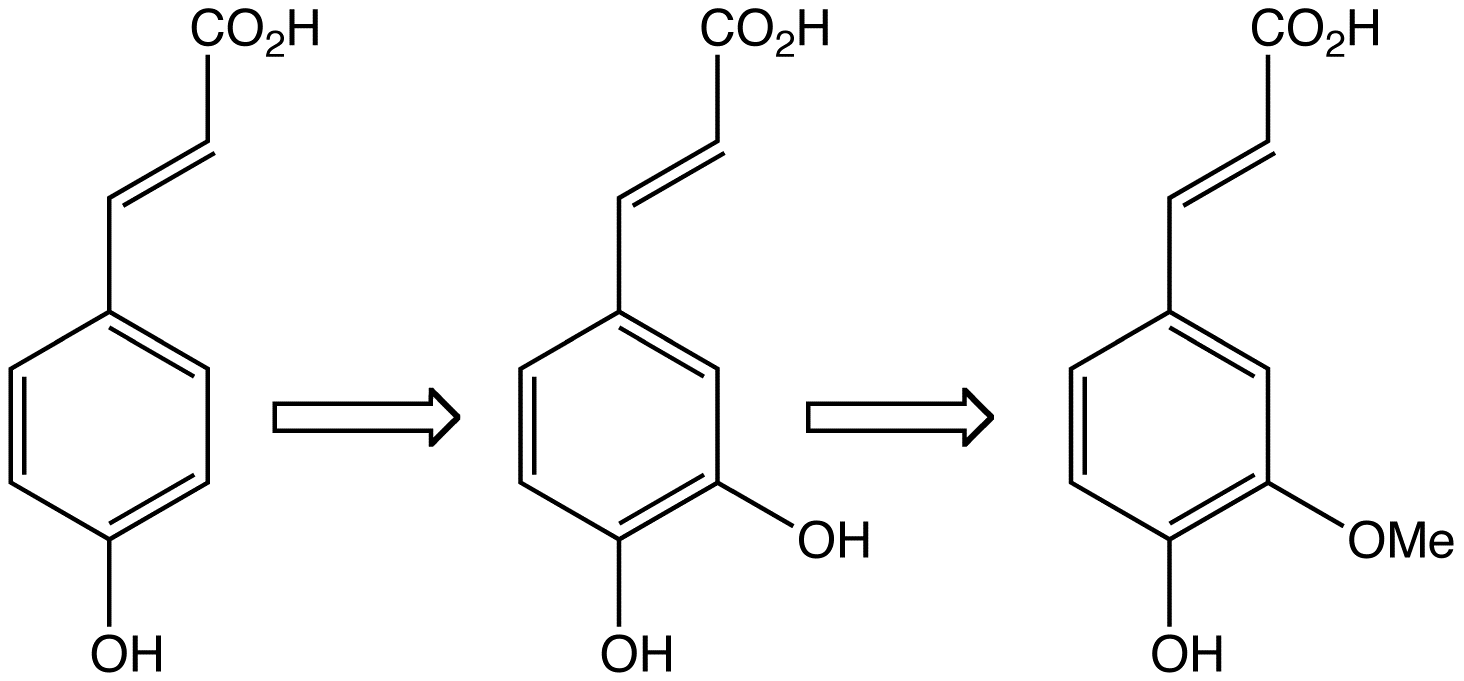
In plants, ferulic acid (right) is derived from phenylalanine (not shown), which is converted to 4-hydroxycinnamic acid (left) and then caffeic acid (center).

=== Biosynthesis ===
Ferulic acid is biosynthesized in plants from caffeic acid by the action of the enzyme caffeate O-methyltransferase.

In a proposed ferulic acid biosynthetic pathway for Escherichia coli, L-tyrosine is converted to 4-coumaric acid by tyrosine ammonia lyase, which is converted to caffeic acid by Sam5, which is then converted to ferulic acid by caffeic acid methyltransferase.

Ferulic acid, together with dihydroferulic acid, is a component of lignocellulose, serving to crosslink the lignin and polysaccharides, thereby conferring rigidity to the cell walls.

It is an intermediate in the synthesis of monolignols, the monomers of lignin, and is also used for the synthesis of lignans.

It is a major metabolite of chlorogenic acids in humans along with caffeic and isoferulic acid, and is absorbed in the small intestine, whereas other metabolites such as dihydroferulic acid, feruloylglycine, and dihydroferulic acid are produced from chlorogenic acid in the large intestine by the action of gut flora.

=== Biodegradation ===
Ferulic acid is converted by certain strains of yeast, notably strains used in brewing of wheat beers, such as Saccharomyces delbrueckii (Torulaspora delbrueckii), to 4-vinylguaiacol (2-methoxy-4-vinylphenol) which gives beers such as Weissbier and Wit their distinctive clove-like flavor. Saccharomyces cerevisiae (dry baker's yeast) and Pseudomonas fluorescens are also able to convert trans-ferulic acid into 4-vinylguaiacol. In P. fluorescens, a ferulic acid decarboxylase has been isolated.

== Function ==
Ferulic acid is one of the compounds that initiate the vir (virulence) region of Agrobacterium tumefaciens, inducing it to infect plant cells.

In cosmetics, ferulic acid is used topically as an ultraviolet light absorber (sunscreen), a treatment for photoaging, and a treatment for skin darkening. The skin absorbs it at the same rate at acidic and neutral pH. It is believed to inhibit melanin formation by competitive inhibition with tyrosine. The oxidation of tyrosine is a necessary step in the formation of melanin.

== See also ==
- Caffeic acid
- Coumaric acid
- Diferulic acids
- Eugenol
- Isoferulic acid, an isomer of ferulic acid
