= C11H14O2 =

The molecular formula C_{11}H_{14}O_{2} (molar mass: 178.23 g/mol) may refer to:

- Actinidiolide
- 4-tert-Butylbenzaldehyde
- para-tert-Butylbenzoic acid
- Methyl eugenol
- Methyl isoeugenol
- Osmorhizole
- 2-Phenethyl propionate
- Wieland–Miescher ketone
