= Propenyl group =

Free radical

In organic chemistry, 1-propenyl (or simply propenyl) has the formula ·CH=CH–CH_{3} and 2-propenyl (isopropenyl) has the formula CH_{2}=(C·)–CH_{3}. These groups are found in many compounds. Propenyl compounds are isomeric with allyl compounds, which have the formula ·CH_{2}–CH=CH_{2}.

The three common precursors to lignin are derivatives of propenylbenzene: paracoumaryl alcohol (1), coniferyl alcohol (2) and sinapyl alcohol (3).

== Chemicals with 1-propenyl groups ==
- 2-chloropropylene
- propenylbenzene (β-methylstyrene).

Many phenylpropanoids and their derivatives feature derivatives of propenylbenzene:

- Anethole
- Asarone
- Carpacin
- Coniferyl alcohol
- Isoeugenol
- Isosafrole
- Methyl isoeugenol
- Pseudoisoeugenol

== Chemicals with 2-propenyl groups ==
p-Isopropenylphenol features a 2-propenyl derivative of phenol.

Isopropenyl acetate is a 2-propenyl ester, synthesizable from ketene.

Several terpenes feature 2-propenyl substituents:

- carvone
- limonene

== See also ==
- Propene
- Functional group
