= Pseudoisoeugenol =

Names
- Preferred IUPAC name 4-Methoxy-2-[(E)-prop-1-enyl]phenol
- Other names 2-(1-Propenyl)-4-methoxyphenol trans-Pseudoisoeugenol

Identifiers
| CAS Number | 98755-22-7 |
| 3D model (JSmol) | Interactive image |
| ChemSpider | 17273716 |
| PubChem CID | 16116489 |
| UNII | TQ75A9G9UX |
| CompTox Dashboard (EPA) | DTXSID101337120 |
- InChI: InChI=1S/C10H12O2/c1-3-4-8-7-9(12-2)5-6-10(8)11/h3-7,11H,1-2H3/b4-3+ Key: CNTCZYAGRDSWBW-ONEGZZNKSA-N
- SMILES: CC=CC1=C(C=CC(=C1)OC)O

Properties
| Chemical formula | C_{10}H_{12}O_{2} |
| Molar mass | 164.204 g·mol^{−1} |
| Density | 1.0 g/cm^{3} |
| Boiling point | 357.3 °C (675.1 °F; 630.5 K) |
- Except where otherwise noted, data are given for materials in their standard state (at 25 °C [77 °F], 100 kPa). Infobox references

Pseudoisoeugenol is a naturally occurring phenylpropene and an isomer of eugenol.

== Natural occurrence and derivatives ==
Pseudoisoeugenol naturally occurs in the essential oils of roots from plants within the genus Pimpinella. In addition to its standard form, the compound also occurs in a variety of structural derivatives. Common derivatives include the compound with its side chain bearing an epoxide functional group and the aromatic ring being associated with one of many possible esters in the 2nd position. Common esters of the phenol group include angelic acid, 2-methylbutanoic acid, tiglic acid, and 2-methylpropionic acid esters. Hydrolysis of these esters, either in vivo or by using strong acids, forms 2-methyl-5-methoxybenzofuran.

== Biosynthesis ==
Biosynthesis of the compound is hypothesized to proceed via a NIH shift of anethole.

== See also ==
- Isoeugenol
