= (Iso)eugenol O-methyltransferase =

Class of enzymes

(iso)eugenol O-methyltransferase

Identifiers
- EC no.: 2.1.1.146
- CAS no.: 191744-33-9

Databases
- BRENDA: enzyme data
- ExPASy: NiceZyme view
- KEGG: enzyme entry
- MetaCyc: metabolic pathway
- Rhea: reactions
- PDB structures: RCSB PDB PDBe PDBsum
- Gene Ontology: AmiGO / QuickGO
Search
- PMC: articles
- PubMed: articles
- NCBI: proteins

(Iso)eugenol O-methyltransferase (EC 2.1.1.146) is an enzyme that catalyzes the chemical reaction

isoeugenol
+ SAM
methyl isoeugenol
+ SAH

This is a methylation reaction in which isoeugenol is converted to its di-ether, methyl isoeugenol. The methyl group comes from the cofactor, S-adenosyl methionine (SAM), which becomes S-adenosyl-L-homocysteine (SAH). The enzyme was characterised from Clarkia breweri.

This enzyme belongs to the family of transferases, specifically those transferring one-carbon group methyltransferases. The systematic name of this enzyme class is S-adenosyl-L-methionine:isoeugenol O-methyltransferase. It also acts on eugenol
