= Nutmeg as a drug =

Hallucinogen

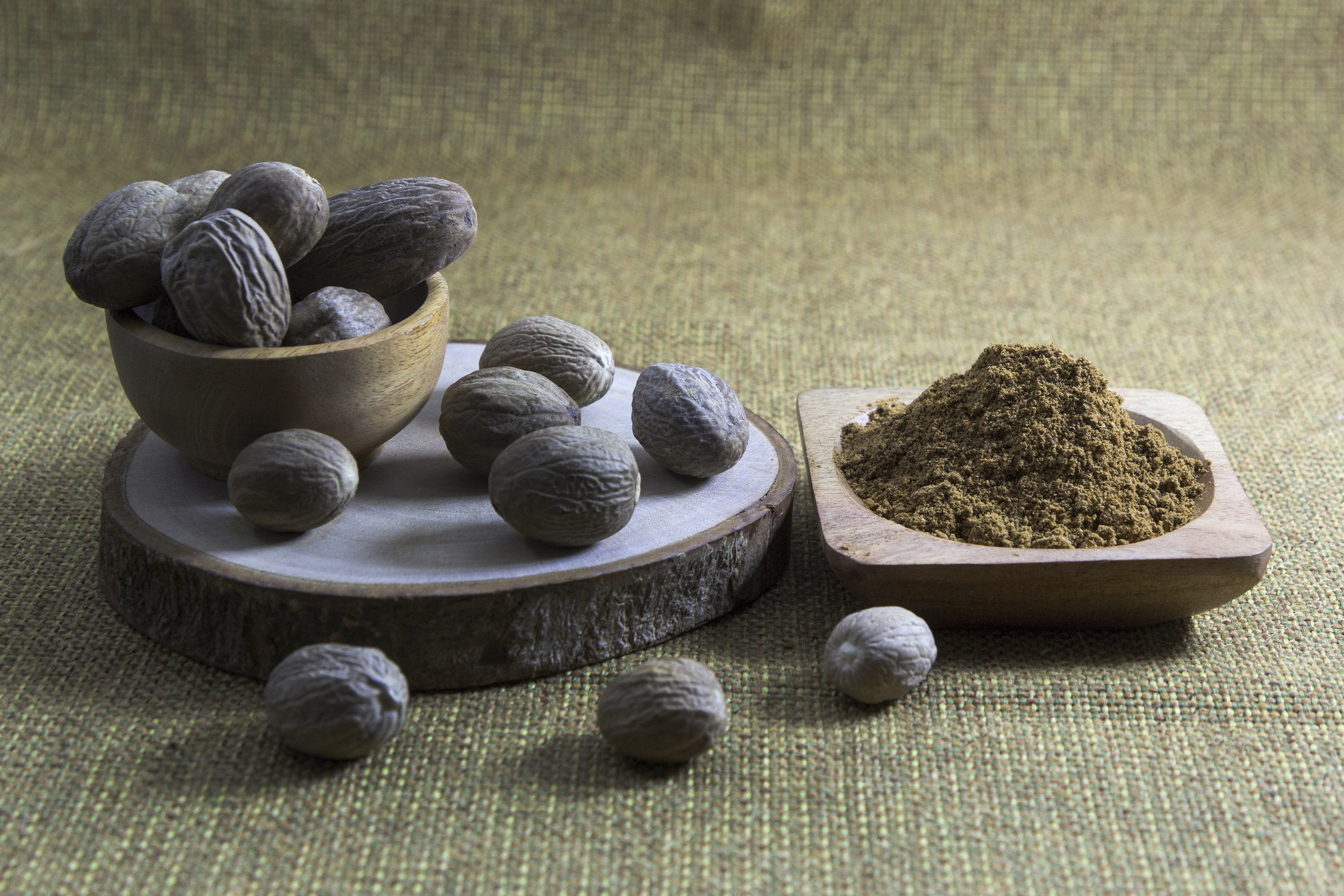
- Nutmeg seeds and ground powder
- Source plant(s): Myristica (e.g., Myristica fragrans)
- Part(s) of plant: Seed (aromatic volatile fraction)
- Geographic origin: Indonesia
- Active ingredients: Myristicin, elemicin, others
- Uses: Recreational as a hallucinogen

Nutmeg is widely used and best-known as a spice in cooking, but in higher amounts, it also produces hallucinogenic and other psychoactive effects. The drug is made from the seeds of several tree species in the genus Myristica, most commonly Myristica fragrans. The key active constituents of nutmeg were once thought to be myristicin and elemicin, but other constituents have since been implicated. It was theorized that constituents like myristicin are converted in the body into psychedelic amphetamines, but this proved to be incorrect. Modern preclinical studies suggest that nutmeg may be acting as an indirect cannabinoid to produce its psychoactive effects. The more expensive spice mace is the outer covering of the nutmeg seed and is similar to nutmeg in constituents and psychoactive effects.

== Use and effects ==
The psychoactive dose range of nutmeg has been reported to be 5 to 30 grams (equivalent to about 0.4–4.5 grams of volatile oil) or approximately one to three nutmegs orally, with a common dose being around 15 to 20 grams of nutmeg. Its onset is delayed with a range of 1 to 8 hours and its duration is 9 to 24 hours, but with residual effects lasting up to 48 to 60 hours or several days. Insufflation is a rare route of administration, but might result in more rapid onset.

The effects of nutmeg have been reported to include drowsiness, stupor, delirium, disorientation, time dilation, dream-like state or "dream pictures", feelings of unreality, distortion of time and space, and initial stimulation followed by subsequent tranquilization. In other reports, the effects included euphoria, peace of mind, excitement, silly feelings and giggling, laughing fits, pleasant and dreamy visions, trance-like state, feeling like everything is in slow motion, drunkenness, perceptual distortion, mental disruption, loss of memory, being "wacked out of your head, sort of", and anxiety. Visual hallucinations are said to be infrequent. It is described as not being especially pleasant and as being highly unpleasant for most users due to pronounced side effects.

Nutmeg has been compared to cannabis intoxication by many users. Other authors have described it as producing anticholinergic-like deliriant symptoms. Alexander Shulgin once theorized that nutmeg might be a serotonergic psychedelic via conversion of active constituents into psychedelic amphetamines along with toxic effects from other constituents, but this has since been disproven. Nutmeg intoxication has also been confused with those of phencyclidine (PCP) and alcohol as well as likened in some respects to that of alcohol.

A clinical study of an isolated fraction of nutmeg that appears to have contained a mixture of myristicin, elemicin, and perhaps a small amount of methylisoeugenol was conducted and published in 1961. A dose of 400 mg of the mixture (equivalent to about 40 g whole nutmeg) was given orally. It produced symptoms suggestive of psychoactive effects such as mild stimulation in 6 of 10 individuals and definite psychoactive effects in 4 of 10 individuals, but failed to exactly reproduce the intoxication characteristic of nutmeg. Effects included euphoria, restlessness, weakness, nervousness, tremor, anxiety, tachycardia, gastrointestinal discomfort, nausea, and others. In the same study, it was found that 10 grams nutmeg with the volatile compounds removed produced no psychoactive effects but did cause in some instances undesirable side effects. It has been suggested that there might be a synergy between myristicin and other nutmeg constituents, for instance other individual allylbenzenes. Alternatively, other constituents may be responsible for the psychoactive and hallucinogenic effects instead.

Shulgin reported one other constituent, methoxyeugenol, to be inactive at doses of up to 10 mg orally.

== Adverse effects ==
Nutmeg intoxication is accompanied by unpleasant physical effects and feeling sick. Adverse effects of nutmeg have been reported to include malaise, nausea, vomiting, abdominal pain, dizziness, dry mouth, thirst, pupil constriction, skin flushing, reddening of the eyes, tachycardia, weak pulses, heart palpitations, hypotension, cold extremities, cyanosis, pallor, dyspnea, hypothermia, drowsiness, sedation, feeling heavy, lethargy, hyperactivity, agitation or restlessness, motor impairment, incoherent speech, loss of memory, stupor, delirium, insomnia, deep sleep, unconsciousness, and feelings and fears of impending death. After-effects are also said to be quite unpleasant and to include not feeling right, bone and muscle aches, eye soreness and aches, runny nose, tiredness, depression, and headaches. While some people may enjoy nutmeg intoxication, most find it to be a "rather grueling" experience, to be "too unpleasant to be addicting", and even to cause prolonged aversion to the spice.

== Toxicity and overdose ==
The toxicity of nutmeg constituents such as myristicin has been studied and described in animals and in humans. There is at least one known case of death in humans, an eight-year-old boy who ate two whole nutmegs, became comatose, and then died within 24 hours, published in 1908. Other fatal cases have also since been reported. Cats are more sensitive to the toxic effects of nutmeg or isolated myristicin and after a delay of a few days die due to severe hepatotoxicity when given these substances in sufficient amounts. Hepatotoxicity has also been observed in guinea pigs and rabbits given very high doses of nutmeg.

== Pharmacology ==
=== Pharmacodynamics ===
The actions and effects of nutmeg and its constituents in in-vitro systems and animals have been described and reviewed.

Nutmeg constituents like myristicin and elemicin have been reported to interact with serotonin receptors. In a subsequent study however, nutmeg extracts showed no affinity for any of the serotonin receptors nor for various other receptors including the muscarinic acetylcholine receptors among others (all <50% binding inhibition at 10,000 nM). Myristicin has been found to act as a weak monoamine oxidase inhibitor (MAOI). Neither myristicin nor elemicin produce the head-twitch response, a behavioral proxy of psychedelic effects, in rodents. However, in another study, elemicin did produce the head-twitch response. On the other hand, myristicin failed to produce electroencephalogram (EEG) activation and behavioral effects similar to those of psychedelic amphetamines such as MMDA in animals. Another study also reported that myristicin did not produce amphetamine-like behavioral effects in rodents.

Nutmeg extracts were compared to Δ^{9}-tetrahydrocannabinol (Δ^{9}-THC), amphetamine, and morphine in rodents and one extract was found to have various activities including some cannabimimetic-like effects. No affinity for the cannabinoid CB_{1} and CB_{2} receptors was found (<50% binding inhibition at 10,000 nM). However, nutmeg extracts were found to weakly inhibit the endocannabinoid-metabolizing enzymes fatty acid amide hydrolase (FAAH) and monoacylglycerol lipase (MAGL) (IC_{50} = 11,370–21,060 nM with different fractions) and to produce antidepressant- and anxiolytic-like effects in rodents. Individual nutmeg constituents such as licarin A, odoratisol A (5′-methoxylicarin A), and malabaricone C were subsequently found to act as weak FAAH inhibitors (IC_{50} = 4,570–38,290 nM) and odoratisol A produced anxiolytic-like effects without affecting locomotor activity. Other studies have found nutmeg extracts to produce anxiogenic effects on the other hand. Effects of nutmeg on anxiety may be dose-dependent analogously to cannabis. More research is needed to identify the constituents of nutmeg responsible for its MAGL inhibition. By inhibiting FAAH and/or MAGL, nutmeg may elevate levels of endocannabinoids such as anandamide (AEA) and 2-arachidonylglycerol (2-AG) and thereby indirectly activate cannabinoid receptors such as the CB_{1} and CB_{2} receptors. There is evidence that nutmeg, in addition to FAAH and MAGL inhibition, may also non-selectively inhibit other enzymes, which could produce additional effects and side effects.

Trimyristin, a triglyceride found in nutmeg, has shown various behavioral effects in rodents such as depressive- and anxiogenic-like effects.

=== Pharmacokinetics ===
Myristicin has been reported to have unfavorable absorption in pure state. The metabolism of myristicin and safrole has been studied. It has been theorized that allylbenzenes like myristicin, elemicin, and safrole might be metabolized via amination into the amphetamine analogues such as MMDA, TMA, and MDA, respectively, but there remains no good supporting evidence for this theory. The non-amine forms can be converted into the amine forms like TMA, MDA, and so on in the presence of ammonia in laboratory settings. In addition, MMDA has been unequivocally detected upon incubation of rat liver cells with myristicin in vitro. Similarly, administration of allylbenzene orally to rats has been found to result in detectable amphetamine in urine. However, no amphetamine metabolites were detected when myristicin was administered to mice, rats, or guinea pigs. Likewise, no amphetamine metabolites were found in a later more modern study in rats and in a human. Other research has found that allylbenzenes including myristicin, elemicin, safrole, and eugenol can in fact be metabolized into nitrogen-containing metabolites, specifically tertiary aminopropiophenones, but these metabolites are not phenethylamines nor amphetamines and their activity is unknown.

== Chemistry ==
=== Constituents ===
Nutmeg consists of 25 to 40% fatty oils or triglycerides (nutmeg butter), 7 to 16% volatile oils, and 45 to 60% pulp or structural components like cellulose. The triglyceride part is mostly trimyristin, but triolein and trilinolein are also found in small amounts. The psychoactive component of nutmeg appears to be the volatile oil component, with most of the rest inactive in animals and humans. It consists 80% of a terpene fraction, 10 to 15% of an aromatic fraction, and the small remainder fatty acids. Turpentine, a fluid made from the resin mainly of pine trees, has a similar composition as the terpene fraction of nutmeg, but has no reputation for producing intoxicating effects.

The aromatic fraction of nutmeg consists of a number of allylbenzenes (propenylbenzenes), mainly myristicin, elemicin, and safrole (these three 84–95%), but also including methyleugenol, methylisoeugenol, methoxyeugenol, isoeugenol, eugenol, and isoelemicin. A 20 gram amount of nutmeg contains about 210 mg myristicin, 70 elemicin, and 39 mg safrole, as well as 3 to 18 mg each of the other compounds. Myristicin makes up approximately 1.3% of whole nutmeg and about 4 to 13% of the volatile oil fraction. Myristicin and elemicin have been thought to be nutmeg's psychoactive constituents, whereas safrole and the various eugenols seem to be inactive with regard to such effects. Though other nutmeg components are inactive, they might aid in the absorption of the active constituents. Alexander Shulgin once theorized that conversion of the allylbenzenes into amphetamines could account for nutmeg's psychoactive effects, whereas the terpene fraction could be responsible for the drug's toxic effects, but the conversion theory has since been disproven.

The constituents of nutmeg were comprehensively reviewed in 2016.

Chemical structures of selected nutmeg constituents
Myristicin

Elemicin

Safrole

Licarin A

5′-Methoxylicarin A (odoratisol A)

Malabaricone C

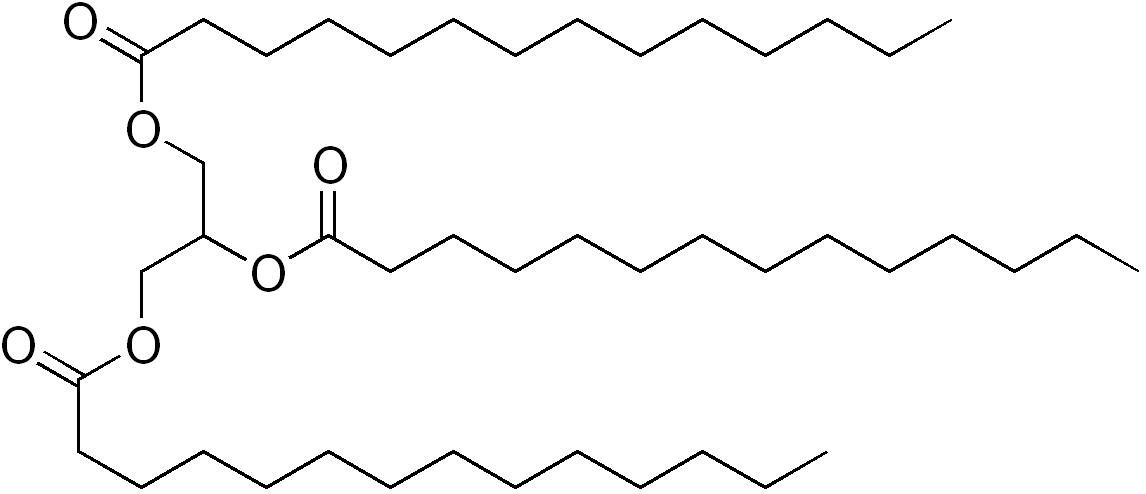
Trimyristin

An analogue, asarone, is more potent than myristicin, elemicin, or safrole in producing hypnotic-like effects in rodents. Asarone is a natural precursor to the psychedelic amphetamine TMA-2, which is substantially more potent as a psychedelic drug than analogues like TMA and mescaline. Asarone is present in Acorus calamus and this root has limited reports of producing stimulant- and psychedelic- or LSD-like effects in humans. However, Shulgin reported that pure asarone produced no effects whatsoever at doses of up to 70 mg orally. For comparison, TMA-2 produces threshold effects at a dose of 10 mg orally and its typical or effective dose range is 20 to 40 mg orally. In accordance with Shulgin's findings, no psychoactive effects were reported and TMA-2 was not detected in a clinical series of Acorus calamus poisonings.

=== Precursor source ===
Nutmeg can be used as a source of precursors like myristicin in the chemical synthesis of amphetamines like MMDA.

== History ==
Nutmeg has been used as a spice by Indian and Arab civilizations as early as 700 BC. It was subsequently introduced into Europe by merchants and traders by 1195 AD. Reports of the intoxicating effects of nutmeg date back to the Middle Ages by Hildegard von Bingen or to ancient times. The first clear mention of nutmeg's psychoactive effects was in 1576, describing a woman becoming "deliriously inebriated". Nutmeg did not become a significant recreational drug in modern times until after World War II. The effects of the aromatic volatile fraction of nutmeg thought to be responsible for its psychoactive effects were first studied and described in humans in 1961. Alexander Shulgin suggested biotransformation into amphetamines in 1963. However, experimental findings contradicted this theory by the 1970s and thereafter. Preclinical research suggesting an indirect cannabinoid or cannabimimetic mechanism of action was published over the time period of 2009 to 2019.

== Society and culture ==
=== Recreational use ===
It was said in the mid-1970s that use of nutmeg for recreational purposes was almost exclusively confined to the United States. It was said to be sought as an alternative to other preferred hallucinogens such as LSD and cannabis. The drug has frequently been used by incarcerated people in prisons. This has led to availability of nutmeg in prison kitchens being restricted.

=== Notable individuals ===
Notable individuals known to have used nutmeg recreationally include:

- William S. Burroughs tried nutmeg once and found it vaguely similar to cannabis but with more side effects.
- Richard Meltzer, the rock critic, is known to have tried nutmeg, expressing that it caused him to experience all music as identical.
- Charlie "Bird" Parker, the jazz saxophonist, is said to have used nutmeg recreationally.
- Malcolm X once tried nutmeg while in prison in 1946, remarking that it "had the kick of three or four reefers".

== Research ==
A low dosage of nutmeg was once studied in the 1960s for treatment of depression under notions of it being a monoamine oxidase inhibitor.

== See also ==
- List of hallucinogens
- PiHKAL § Essential amphetamines
