= Nutmeg (disambiguation) =

Nutmeg is a spice, usually obtained from the plant Myristica fragrans. It may also refer to:

== Living things ==
=== Plants ===
- Atherosperma moschatum, an Australian tree sometimes known as plume nutmeg or New Holland nutmeg
- Carya myristiciformis, a species of hickory tree also known as nutmeg hickory
- Leycesteria formosa, a shrub sometimes known as flowering nutmeg or Himalaya nutmeg
- Monodora myristica a tropical tree sometimes known as calabash nutmeg, African nutmeg or Jamaican nutmeg
- Myristica argentea, Papua nutmeg, Guinea nutmeg, Norse nutmeg or Macassar nutmeg
- Myristica fragrans, fragrant nutmeg, the usual source of the spice
- Myristica malabarica, Malabar nutmeg, or Bombay nutmeg
- Torreya, a genus of conifers also known as nutmeg yew
- Montreal melon, sometimes called "nutmeg melon"

=== Animals ===
- Nutmeg snails, a common name of the genus Cancellariidae
  - Common nutmeg, a species of nutmeg snail
- Nutmeg (moth)
- Scaly-breasted munia, also known as the nutmeg mannikin

== Music ==
- Nutmeg (band), an indie-rock band from Sweden
- The Nutmegs, a doo wop group from the 1950s
- "Nutmeg", a track on Ghostface's album Supreme Clientele
- "Nutmeg", a track on Das Racist's mixtape Shut Up, Dude
- "Nutmeg", a track on Infected Mushroom's album Return to the Sauce

== Other uses ==
- Nutmeg 24, a Canadian sailboat design
- Nutmeg (cat), the former longest-lived cat
- Nutmeg (association football), a football technique
- Nutmeg (company), an investment company based in London
- Nutmeg as a drug
- Nutmeg oil, a volatile oil derived from nutmeg
- Nutmeg (train), a former passenger train of the New York, New Haven and Hartford Railroad
- Nutmeg (crossword compiler), a pseudonym of crossword compiler Margaret Irvine (1948–2023)
- Nutmeg, a clothing brand by retailer Morrisons

== See also ==
- "The Nutmeg State", a nickname for Connecticut
- Nutmegger, a nickname for people from the state of Connecticut
