= Caleicine =

Chemical compound

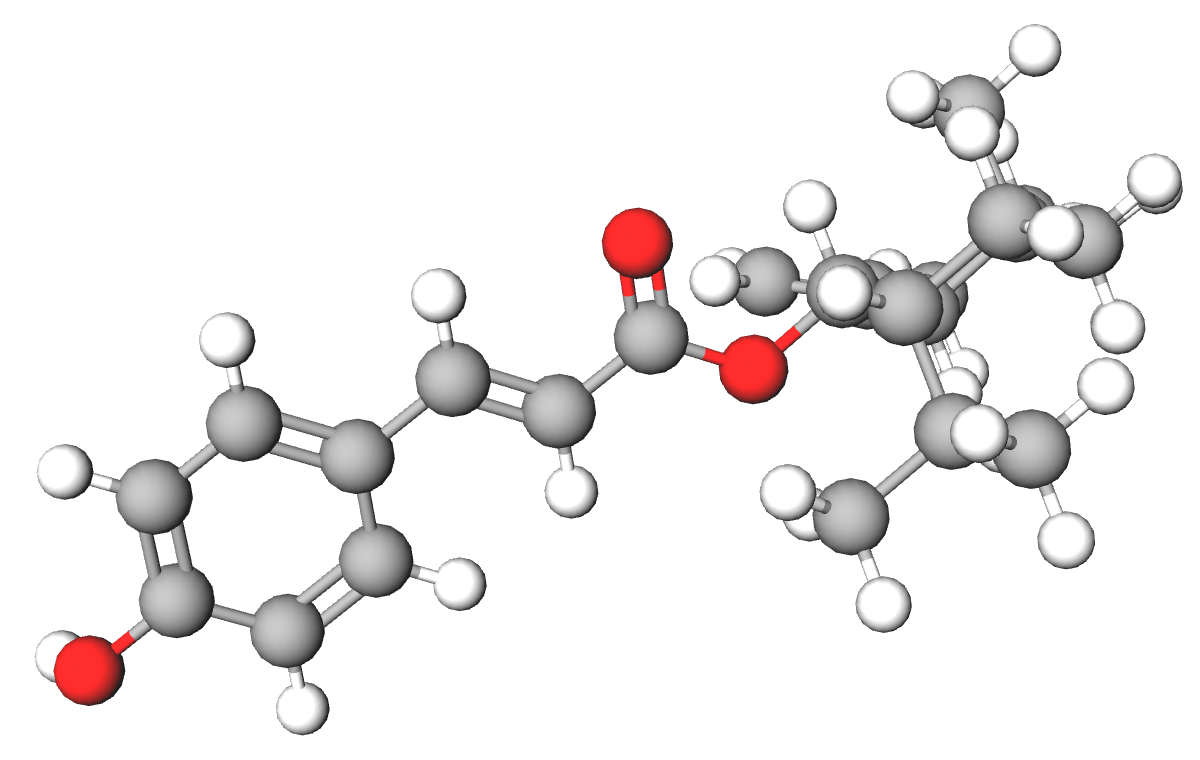

Legal status
- Legal status: In general: uncontrolled

Identifiers
- CAS Number: 140384-72-1
- PubChem CID: 21726659
- ChemSpider: 10315583
- ChEMBL: ChEMBL455625

Chemical and physical data
- Formula: C_{24}H_{32}O_{3}
- Molar mass: 368.517 g·mol^{−1}
- 3D model (JSmol): Interactive image
- SMILES: OC1=CC=C(/C=C/C(O[C@H]2C(CC[C@]3(CCCC([C@]23[H])=C)C)C(C)C)=O)C=C1
- InChI: InChI=InChI=1S/C24H32O3/c1-16(2)20-13-15-24(4)14-5-6-17(3)22(24)23(20)27-21(26)12-9-18-7-10-19(25)11-8-18/h7-12,16,20,22-23,25H,3,5-6,13-15H2,1-2,4H3/b12-9+/t20?,22-,23+,24-/m1/s1; Key:IIZXOWSEQGPRRJ-ORWIVXHPSA-N

Caleicine is a unique sesquiterpene compound found exclusively in Calea ternifolia, a Mexican flowering plant known for its potential psychoactive properties. This compound has garnered interest in the field of ethnopharmacology and natural product chemistry due to its putative role as a prodrug of eugenol, a potent GABA positive modulator.

Caleicine is the p-Coumaric ester of junenol and has no lactone moiety making it distinctly unique from the other sesquiterpene lactones in Calea ternifolia.

== Chemistry ==
Caleicine is a sesquiterpene that has a phenylpropanoid moiety bonded to junenol

In an investigation, lab mice were administered with an aqueous solution of Calea ternifolia in doses of 200, 400 and 800 mg and made to undergo a forced swim test. Under dosages of 400 and 800 mg, the mice showed depressive like effects.

=== Theorised Mechanism of action ===
The mechanisms of Calea ternifolia induced somnolence are not well understood, however, caleicine could play a role due to its potential metabolism.

Caleicine contains p-Coumaric acid. In the body, p-Coumaric acid is biosynthesised into many lignols and phenylpropanoids including eugenol.

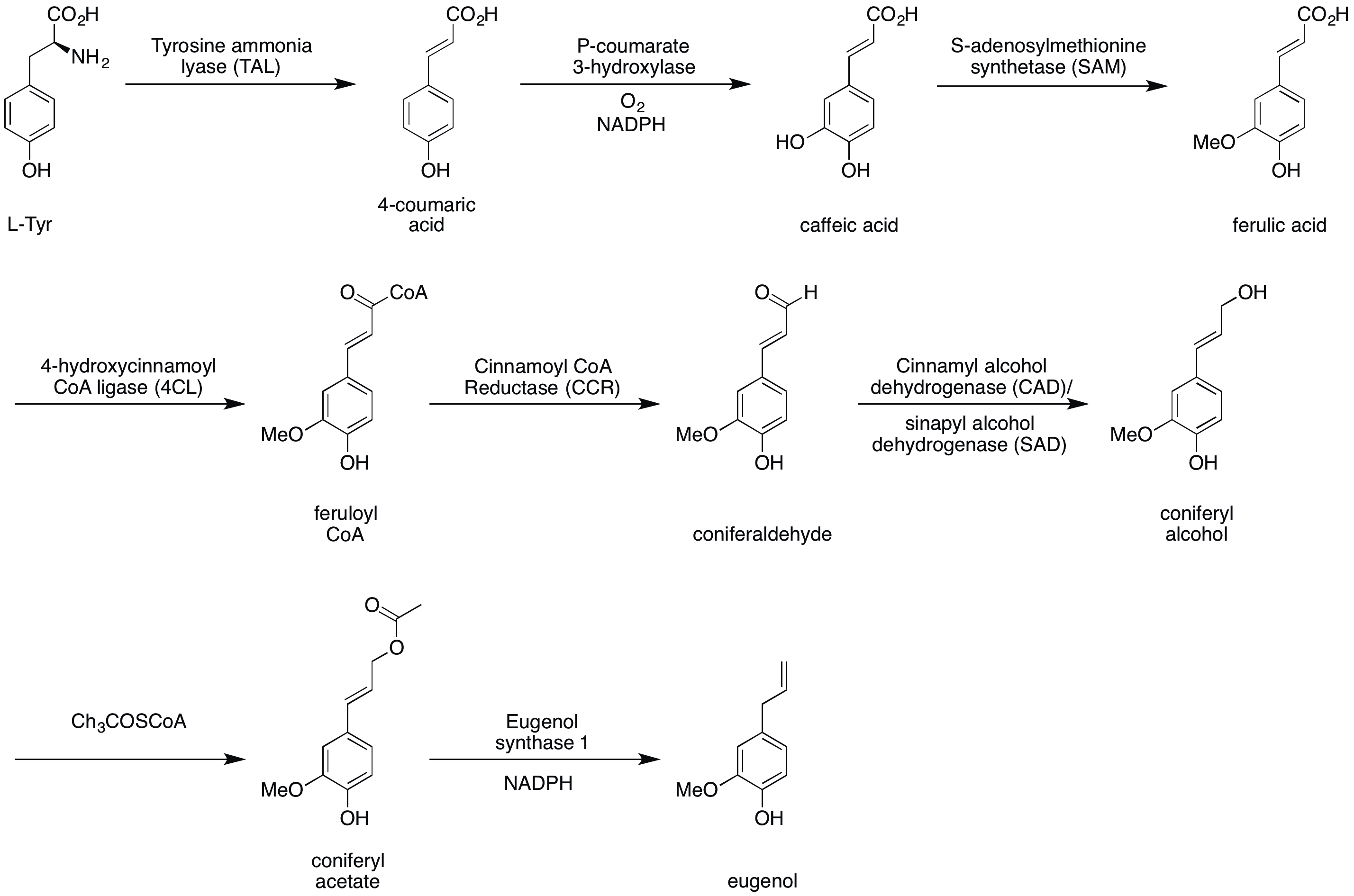
Eugenol biosynthesis. P-Coumaric Acid, labelled 4-Coumaric Acid, is listed at step 2

Eugenol acts as a positive allosteric modulator of the GABA_{A} receptor which is common amongst oneirogens. In addition, eugenol inhibits both MAO-A and MAO-B, inhibiting the metabolism of serotonin, melatonin and dopamine.

Eugenol is one of many potential metabolites of caleicine, and the mechanisms of both caleicine (specifically) and the herb Calea ternifolia (more broadly) are poorly understood.

Caleicine is a unique sesquiterpene compound found only in Calea ternifolia and is one of many GABAergic compounds found in the plant and acts as a prodrug to the known bioactive and potent eugenol. Caleicine is a strong candidate to be responsible the effects of Calea ternifolia as the GABA modulation eugenol exhibits are the same that of Calea ternifolia.

Negative side effects associated with Calea ternifolia include nausea, vomiting and delirium based hallucinations, which are similar to those are similar to those associated with eugenol.

GABA positive allosteric site modulation is found in many sedative substances such as methaqualone, propofol, ethanol, and zolpidem. The properties of GABA positive modulating substances typically are anxiolytic, anticonvulsant, oneirogenic, sedative, hypnotic, euphoriant, and muscle relaxant effects.

== See also ==
- GABA receptor
- Germacranolides
- Myristicin
