= Methylbutyric acid =

Methylbutyric acid may refer to:

- 2-Methylbutyric acid (2-methylbutanoic acid)
- 3-Methylbutyric acid (3-methylbutanoic acid)

== See also ==
- Methyl butyrate
