= Oil of clove =

Essential oil extracted from clove plants

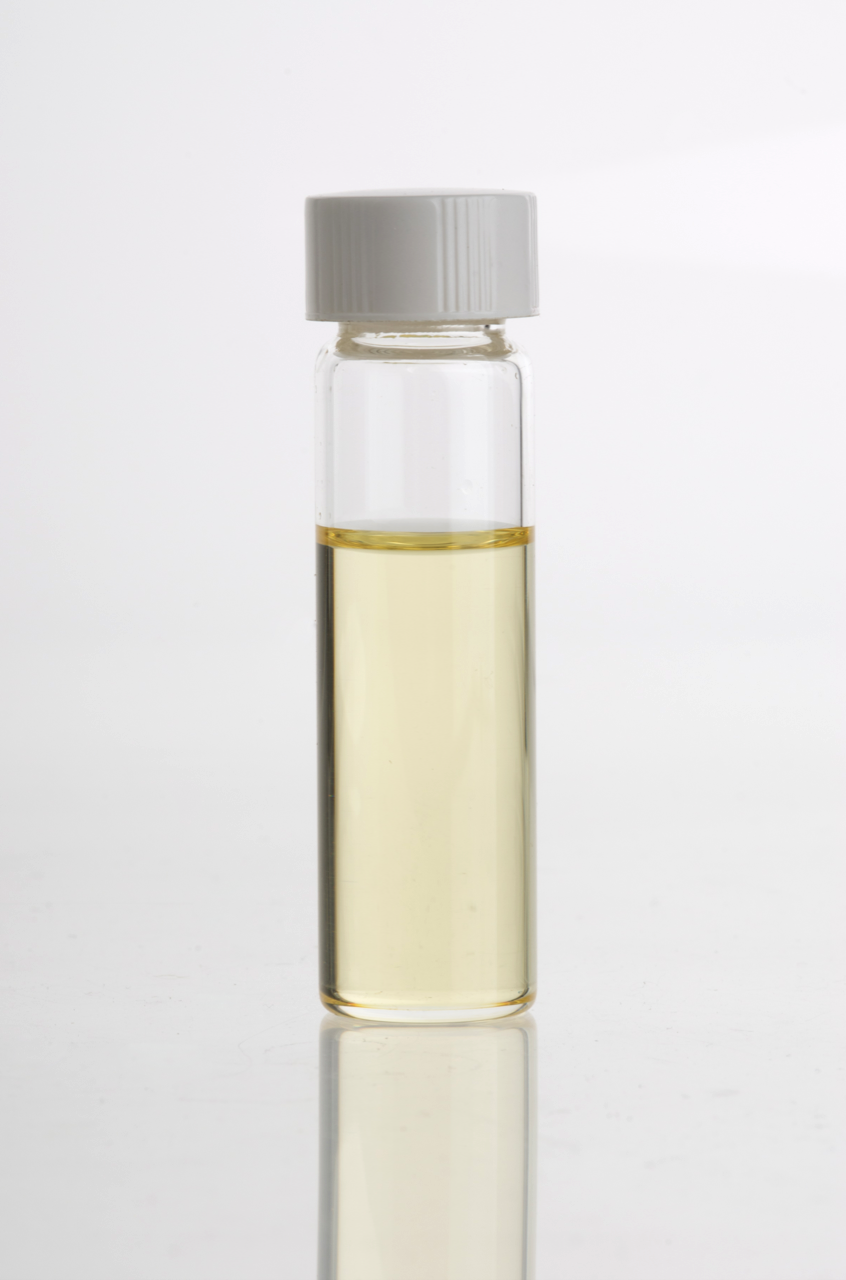
Clove (Syzygium aromaticum) essential oil in clear glass vial

Oil of clove is an essential oil extracted from the clove plant Syzygium aromaticum. Clove oil is mainly (90%) eugenol, a phenolic compound widespread in nature. It is for flavoring food, tea, and toothpaste. In alternative medicine, it may be used as a topical medication to relieve toothache. There is insufficient medical evidence to support its use as an analgesic for treating pain.

Madagascar and Indonesia are the main producers of clove oil.

== Types and phytochemicals ==
Clove oil is obtained by steam distillation of various parts of the clove tree. There are three types of clove oil:

- Bud oil is derived from the flower-buds of S. aromaticum. It consists of 60–90% eugenol, eugenol acetate, caryophyllene and other minor constituents.
- Leaf oil is derived from the leaves of S. aromaticum. It consists of 70–82% eugenol, and some amounts of beta Caryophyllene and alpha Humulene.
- Stem oil is derived from the twigs of S. aromaticum. It consists of 85–92% eugenol, with other minor constituents. Stem oil is closer in olfactive and flavor profile to bud oil.

Distilled clove oil from buds contains mixed phytochemicals, including as main constituents phenylpropanoids (primarily eugenol), carvacrol, thymol, and cinnamaldehyde, with smaller quantities of polyphenols, carbohydrates, lipids, oleanolic acid, and rhamnetin.

== Toothache ==
Particularly in South Korea and India, eugenol, an aromatic compound extracted from clove oil, is used in alternative medicine to relieve toothache. Applied to a cavity in a decayed tooth or tooth socket remaining after extraction, eugenol or clove oil may relieve toothache temporarily. There is insufficient scientific evidence that eugenol is effective for treating dental pain.

In the late 19th and early 20th centuries, clove oil was a popular ingredient in European toothache medications. Examples of such preparations included Stoffels Zahnschmerzstille, Odontine and Jehnol.

== Other uses ==
Clove oil is commonly used to anesthetize or euthanize laboratory or pet fish.

Clove oil is a component of choji oil (Japanese: 丁子油), which was traditionally used for the maintenance of Japanese swords.

== Regulation ==
In Germany, Commission E permits the sale and administration of clove oil for use in alternative medicine.
