= C11H14O3 =

The molecular formula C_{11}H_{14}O_{3} (molar mass: 194.22 g/mol) may refer to:

- Butylparaben
- tert-Butyl peroxybenzoate
- Zingerone (also called vanillylacetone)
- Methoxyeugenol
