= Methylbutyrate =

Methylbutyrate may refer to:

- Methyl butyrate, the methyl ester of butyric acid
- 2-Methylbutyrate, the conjugate base of 2-methylbutyric acid (2-methylbutanoic acid)
- 3-Methylbutyrate, the conjugate base of 3-methylbutyric acid (3-methylbutanoic acid)
