= C12H14O3 =

The molecular formula C_{12}H_{14}O_{3} (molar mass: 206.241 g/mol) may refer to:

- Ethyl methylphenylglycidate
- Acetyleugenol
