= C26H42N7O17P3S =

The molecular formula C_{26}H_{42}N_{7}O_{17}P_{3}S (molar mass: 849.64 g/mol, exact mass: 849.1571 u) may refer to:

- Methylcrotonyl-CoA
- Tiglyl-CoA
