= Benzyl alcohol O-benzoyltransferase =

Class of enzymes

Identifiers
- EC no.: 2.3.1.196

Databases
- IntEnz: IntEnz view
- BRENDA: BRENDA entry
- ExPASy: NiceZyme view
- KEGG: KEGG entry
- MetaCyc: metabolic pathway
- PRIAM: profile
- PDB structures: RCSB PDB PDBe PDBsum
Search
- PMC: articles
- PubMed: articles
- NCBI: proteins

Benzyl alcohol O-benzoyltransferase (EC 2.3.1.196, benzoyl-CoA:benzyl alcohol benzoyltransferase, benzoyl-CoA:benzyl alcohol/phenylethanol benzoyltransferase, benzoyl-coenzyme A:benzyl alcohol benzoyltransferase, benzoyl-coenzyme A:phenylethanol benzoyltransferase) is an enzyme with systematic name benzoyl-CoA:benzyl alcohol O-benzoyltransferase. This enzyme catalyses the following chemical reaction

benzyl alcohol
+
benzoyl-CoA
benzyl benzoate
+ coenzyme A

The enzyme is responsible for the biosyntheis of the volatile ester, benzyl benzoate, in response to damage of the petals of petunia, and the leaves of Clarkia breweri.
