= 4-Isopropenylphenol =

Names
- Preferred IUPAC name 4-(Prop-1-en-2-yl)phenol
- Other names p-Isopropenylphenol

Identifiers
CAS Number	4286-23-1
3D model (JSmol)	Interactive image
ChEMBL	ChEMBL277808
ChemSpider	507836
PubChem CID	584247
UNII	2QP218C90D
CompTox Dashboard (EPA)	DTXSID90962744
- InChI: InChI=1S/C9H10O/c1-7(2)8-3-5-9(10)6-4-8/h3-6,10H,1H2,2H3 Key: JAGRUUPXPPLSRX-UHFFFAOYSA-N
- SMILES: CC(=C)C1=CC=C(C=C1)O

Properties
Chemical formula	C_{9}H_{10}O
Molar mass	134.178 g·mol^{−1}
Appearance	white solid
Melting point	83 °C (181 °F; 356 K)

Hazards
- GHS labelling
Pictograms	(GHS07: Exclamation mark) (GHS08: Health hazard)
Signal word	Warning
Hazard statements	H302, H371
Precautionary statements	P260, P264, P270, P301+P317, P308+P316, P330, P405, P501
- Except where otherwise noted, data are given for materials in their standard state (at 25 °C [77 °F], 100 kPa). Infobox references

4-Isopropenylphenol is an organic compound with the formula CH_{2}=(CH_{3})CC_{6}H_{4}OH. The molecule consists of a 2-propenyl group (CH_{2}=C-CH_{3}) affixed to the 4 position of phenol. The compound is an intermediate in the production of bisphenol A (BPA), 2.7 Mkg/y of which are produced annually (2007). It is also generated by the recycling of o,p-BPA, a byproduct of the production of the p,p-isomer of BPA.

== Synthesis and reactions ==
The high-temperature hydrolysis of BPA gives the title compound together with phenol:

(CH_{3})_{2}C(C_{6}H_{4}OH)_{2} + H_{2}O → CH_{2}=(CH_{3})CC_{6}H_{4}OH + C_{6}H_{5}OH

The compound can also be produced by catalytic dehydrogenation of 4-isopropylphenol.

4-Isopropenylphenol undergoes O-protonation by sulfuric acid, giving the carbocation, which undergoes a variety of dimerization reactions.
