= Eugenol synthase =

Class of enzymes

Identifiers
- EC no.: 1.1.1.318

Databases
- BRENDA: enzyme data
- ExPASy: NiceZyme view
- KEGG: enzyme entry
- MetaCyc: metabolic pathway
- Rhea: reactions
- PDB structures: RCSB PDB PDBe PDBsum
Search
- PMC: articles
- PubMed: articles
- NCBI: proteins

Eugenol synthase (EC 1.1.1.318, LtCES1, EGS1, EGS2) is an enzyme with systematic name eugenol:NADP^{+} oxidoreductase (coniferyl ester reducing). This enzyme catalyses the following chemical reaction: eugenol + a carboxylate + NADP^{+} $\rightleftharpoons$ a coniferyl ester + NADPH + H^{+}

The enzyme acts in the reverse direction.
