= Elemicin =

Chemical compound

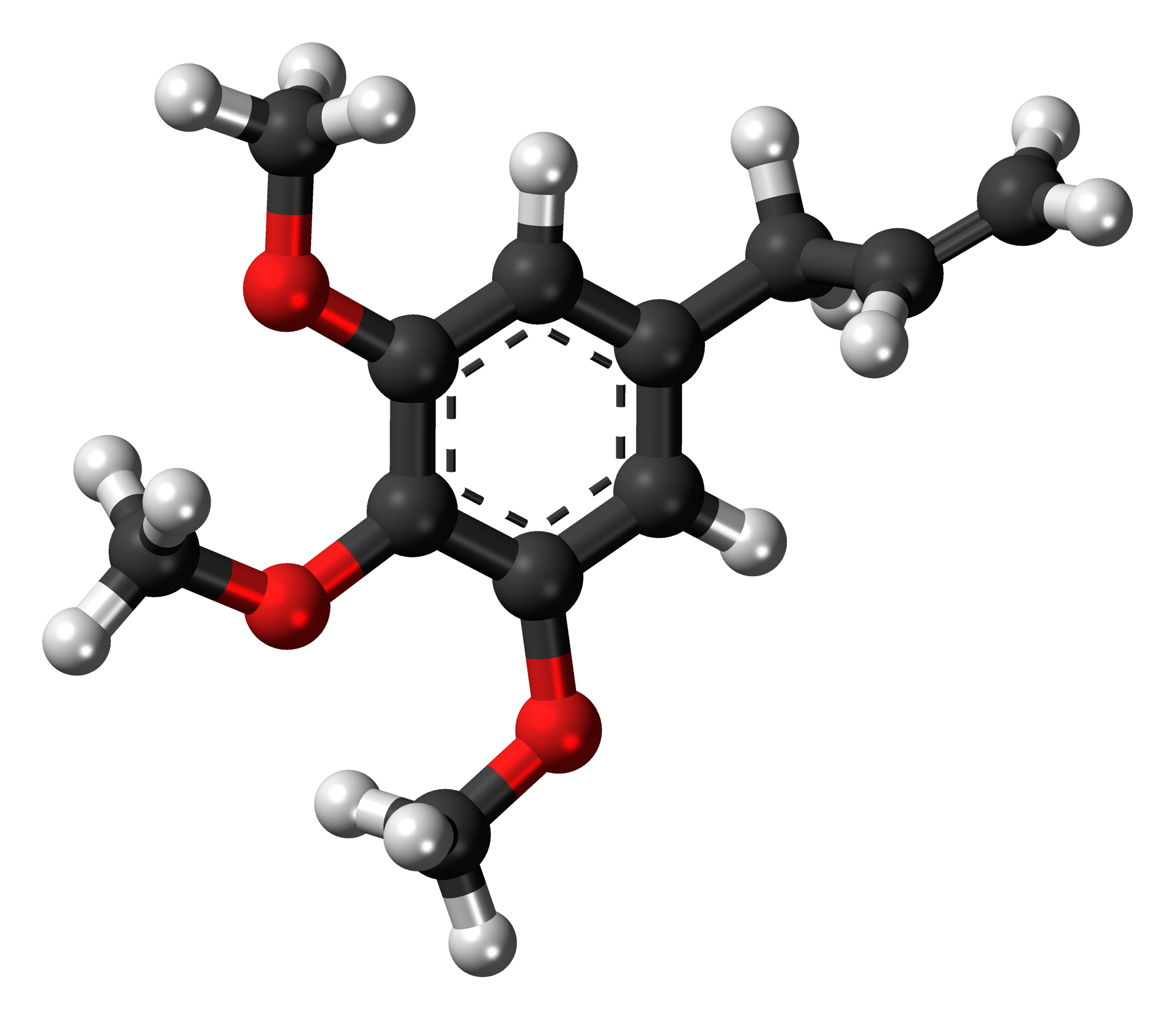

Clinical data
- Other names: 3,4,5-Trimethoxyallylbenzene; 5-Allyl-1,2,3-trimethoxybenzene
- Dependence liability: None
- Addiction liability: Low / none
- Routes of administration: Oral
- ATC code: None

Legal status
- Legal status: In general: uncontrolled

Identifiers
- IUPAC name: 1,2,3-trimethoxy-5-prop-2-enylbenzene
- CAS Number: 487-11-6
- PubChem CID: 10248
- ChemSpider: 9830
- UNII: HSZ191AKAN
- KEGG: C10451
- ChEMBL: ChEMBL458690
- CompTox Dashboard (EPA): DTXSID60197586
- ECHA InfoCard: 100.006.954

Chemical and physical data
- Formula: C_{12}H_{16}O_{3}
- Molar mass: 208.257 g·mol^{−1}
- 3D model (JSmol): Interactive image
- SMILES: C=CCC1=CC(OC)=C(OC)C(OC)=C1
- InChI: InChI=1S/C12H16O3/c1-5-6-9-7-10(13-2)12(15-4)11(8-9)14-3/h5,7-8H,1,6H2,2-4H3; Key:BPLQKQKXWHCZSS-UHFFFAOYSA-N

Elemicin is a phenylpropene, a natural organic compound, and is a constituent of several plant species' essential oils.

== Natural occurrence ==
Elemicin is a constituent of the oleoresin and the essential oil of Canarium luzonicum (also referred to as elemi). Elemicin is named after this tree. One study found it to compose 2.4% of the fresh essential oil. Elemicin is also present in the oils of the spices nutmeg and mace, with it composing 2.4% and 10.5% of those oils respectively. Structurally, elemicin is similar to myristicin, differing only by myristicin's methyl group that joins the two oxygen atoms that make up its dioxymethy moiety, with both constituents being found in nutmeg and mace.

== Pharmacology ==
=== Pharmacodynamics ===
Raw nutmeg causes anticholinergic-like effects, which are attributed to elemicin and myristicin. Elemicin inhibits Stearoyl-CoA Desaturase 1 (SCD1) by metabolic activation. Elemicin is one of the main components in aromatic food and has antimicrobial, antioxidant, and antiviral activities. Elemicin possesses genotoxicity and carcinogenicity. Excess consumption of raw nutmeg results in delirium and disorientation.

Elemicin's psychoactivity is still a point of research, however some research suggests it may act like an agonist of the serotonin 5-HT_{2A} receptors, similar to many psychedelics. However, this is controversial as the psychoactive effects of elemicin and plants it is found in, such as nutmeg, seem to cause more deliriant-like effects than psychedelic ones. Findings on whether elemicin produces the head-twitch response, a behavioral proxy of psychedelic effects, in rodents are conflicting, with one study reporting that it did but another reporting that it did not.

== Chemistry ==
=== Isolation ===
Elemicin was first isolated from elemi oil using vacuum distillation. Specifically, the substance was collected between 162-165 °C at a reduced pressure of 10 torr.

=== Synthesis ===
Elemicin has been synthesized from syringol and allyl bromide using Williamson ether synthesis and Claisen rearrangement. The electrophilic aromatic substitution entering the para-position was made possible by secondary Cope rearrangement. This is due to syringol's allyl aromatic ether being blocked by ethers in both ortho-positions. When blocked the allyl group migrates to the para-position, in this case with yields above 85%.

=== Chemical precursor ===
Elemicin has been used to synthesize the proto-alkaloid mescaline.

== History ==
Elemicin was first described in the scientific literature by 1908.

== See also ==
- Nutmeg as a drug
- Nutmeg oil
- Myristicin
- Phenylpropanoid
- PiHKAL § Essential amphetamines
