= Calea ternifolia =

Scientific classification
- Kingdom: Plantae
- Clade: Embryophytes
- Clade: Tracheophytes
- Clade: Angiosperms
- Clade: Eudicots
- Clade: Asterids
- Order: Asterales
- Family: Asteraceae
- Genus: Calea
- Species: C. ternifolia

Binomial name
- Calea ternifolia Kunth

Synonyms
- Calea zacatechichi Schltdl.

Species of plant

Calea ternifolia (syn. Calea zacatechichi) is a species of flowering plant in the aster family, Asteraceae. It is native to Mexico and Central America. Its English language common names include bitter-grass, Mexican calea, and dream herb.

It is used in traditional medicine and ritual in its native range.

== Uses ==
In Mexico the plant is used as a herbal remedy for dysentery and fever. The Zoque Popoluca people call the plant tam huñi ("bitter gum") and use it to treat diarrhea and asthma, and the Mixe people know it as poop taam ujts ("white bitter herb") and use it for stomachache and fever.

Dried leaves of the Calea ternifolia

The Chontal people of Oaxaca reportedly use the plant, known locally as thle-pela-kano, during divination. Isolated reports describe rituals that involve smoking a plant believed to be this species, drinking it as a tea, and placing it under a pillow to induce divinatory or lucid dreams due to its properties as an oneirogen. Zacatechichi, the former species name, is a Hispanicized form of the Nahuatl word "zacatl chichic" meaning "bitter grass". Users take the plant to help them remember their dreams; known side effects include nausea and vomiting related to the taste and mild-to-severe allergic reaction.

While quite bitter if brewed in hot water, the bitterness can be considerably masked by brewing with Osmanthus flowers, which have a compatible scent profile.

== Chemical composition ==
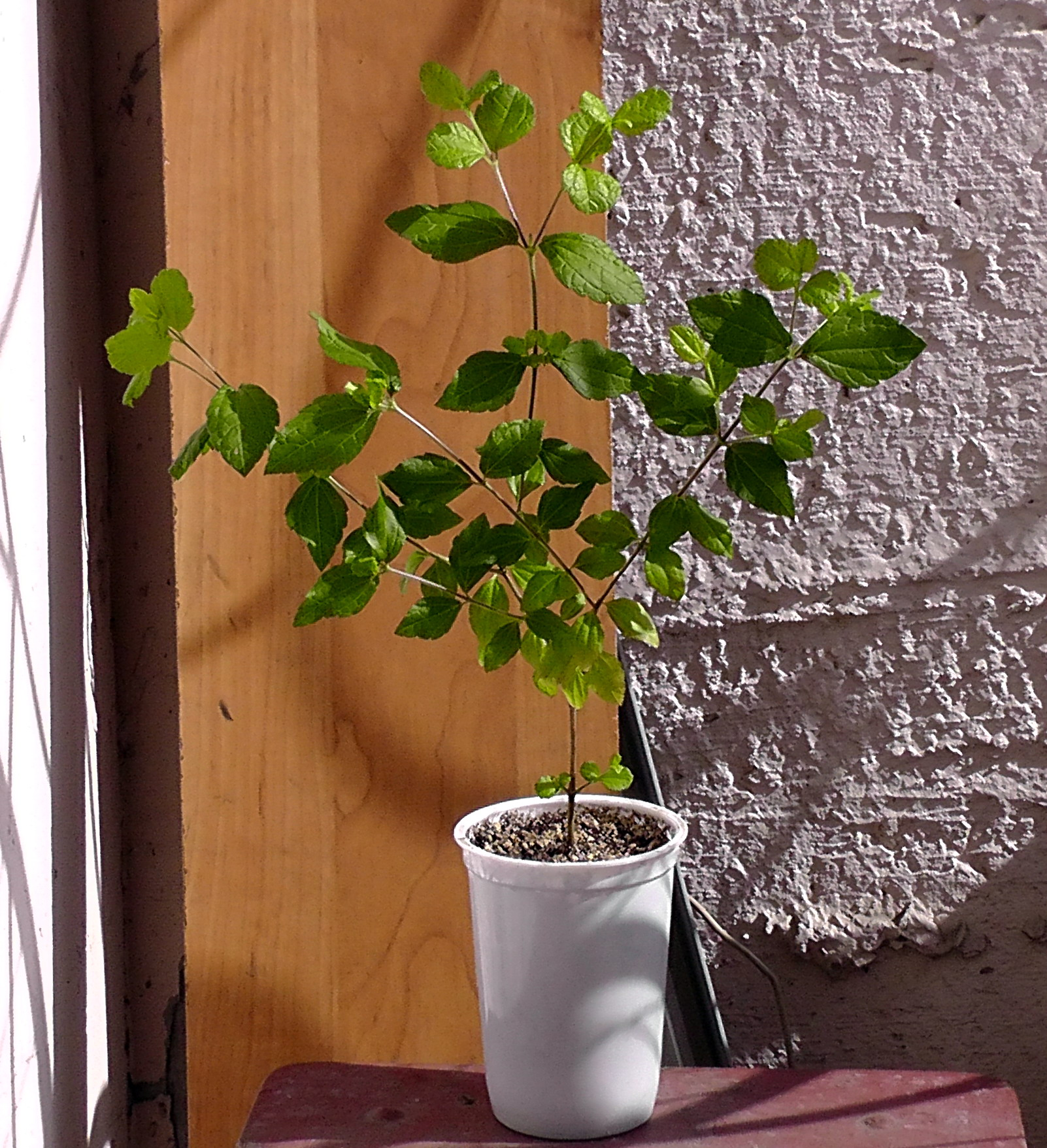
Cultivated specimen

Chemical compounds isolated from this species include flavones such as acacetin and sesquiterpene lactones such as germacranolides. The compound that is thought to cause the effects of Calea ternifolia is caleicine, a prodrug of eugenol, a potent GABA positive modulator.

== Pharmacology ==
Calea ternifolia and its effects are not fully understood beyond GABA modulation from caleicine and other GABAergic compounds. The plant is known to potentiate dreams and hypnotic states and is bioavailable through common routes of administration such as smoking and oral.

Many compounds have been isolated from the plant and suspected to cause the psychoactive effects. Notable compounds that have been isolated are:

- Chlorogenic acid (Lowers blood pressure)
- Α-Pinene (GABA_{a} positive modulator)
- Caleicine (Prodrug of eugenol, a potent GABA positive modulator)
- Squalene (Precursor to steroid hormones)

Caleicine is a unique sesquiterpene compound found only in Calea ternifolia and is one of many GABAergic compounds found in the plant and acts as a prodrug to the known bioactive and potent eugenol. Caleicine is a strong candidate to be responsible the effects of Calea ternifolia as the GABA modulation eugenol exhibits are the same that of Calea ternifolia.

Calea ternifolia's negative side effects, nausea, vomiting and delirium based hallucinations, are the same that of eugenol and other GABAergic compounds.

GABA positive allosteric site modulation is found in many sedative substances such as Methaqualone, Propofol, Alcohol (Ethanol) and Zolpidem. The properties of GABA positive modulating substances typically are anxiolytic, anticonvulsant, oneirogenic, sedative, hypnotic, euphoriant, and muscle relaxant effects.

In a study, 12 participants were given extracts of Calea ternifolia and experienced effects of mild augmentation of sensorial perceptions, imaginings, thought gaps, and retrieval problems; lethargy and a short sleep with vivid dreams.

== Legal status ==
While it is not a controlled substance under federal law in the United States, some states have considered it individually. Louisiana State Act 159 specifies that it is illegal to possess if it is intended for human consumption, but not if they are intended for ornamental or landscaping use. Tennessee proposed a bill that would have made this and many other plants classified as hallucinogenic illegal, but when the bill was passed only Salvia divinorum was banned.

This plant was banned in Poland in March 2009.

Under the Psychoactive Substances Act 2016 in the United Kingdom, Calea is technically illegal, however as the mechanisms are not well understood, it cannot be classed as a CNS stimulant or depressant and is therefore legal.

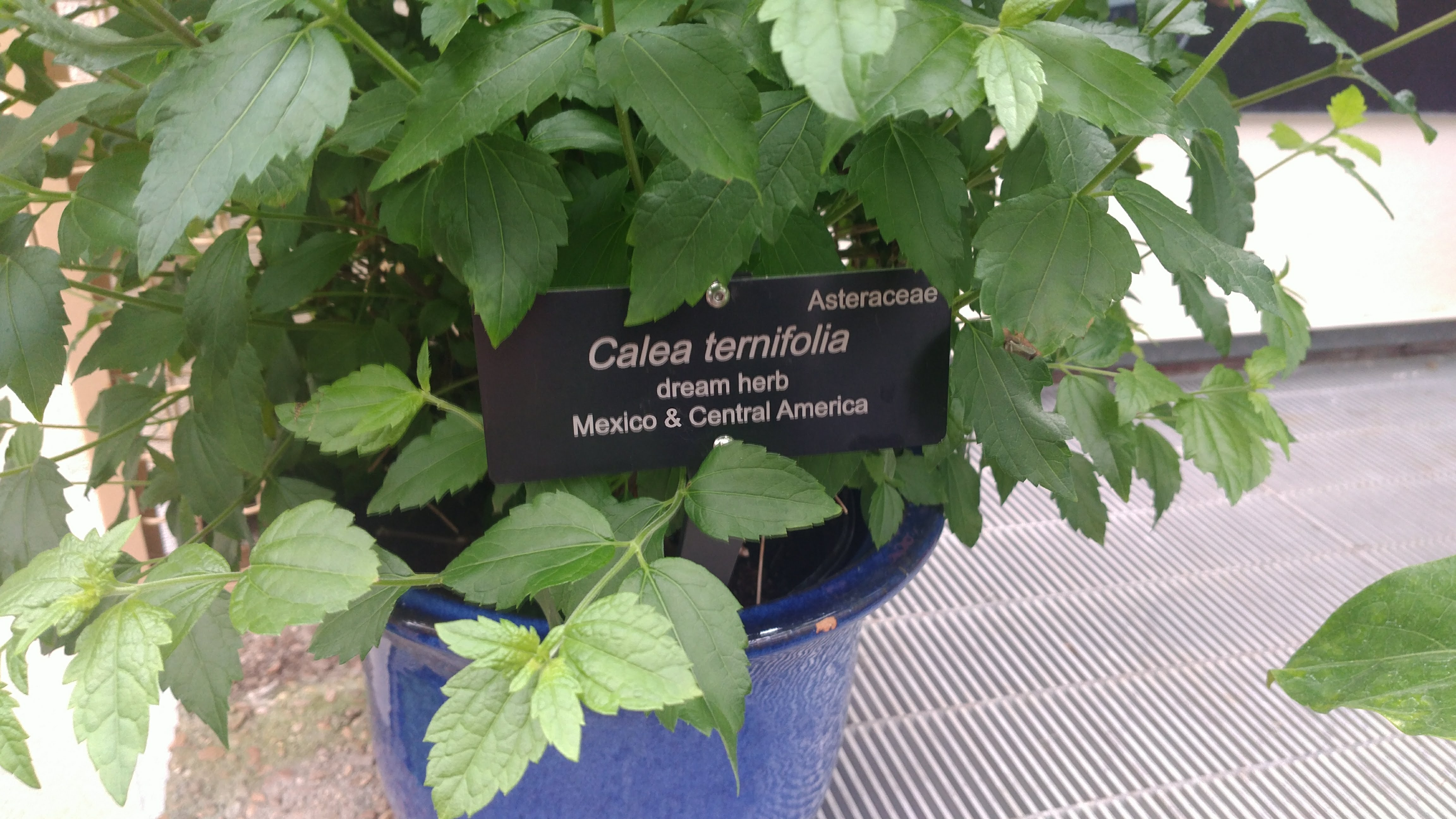
Calea ternifolia (syn. Calea zacatechichi) dream herb

== Nephrotoxicity ==
One study suggest that the herb may have some toxic properties towards kidneys (nephrotoxicity). This is likely due to the caleicine in the plant being metabolised into the nephrotoxic compound eugenol that can cause liver toxicity in high doses.

== See also ==
- Oneirogen
- Caleicine
