= 4-Isopropylphenol =

p-Isopropylphenol

Names
- Preferred IUPAC name 4-(Propan-2-yl)phenol
- Other names p-Isopropylphenol

Identifiers
CAS Number	99-89-8
3D model (JSmol)	Interactive image
ChEBI	CHEBI:167172
ChEMBL	ChEMBL29966
ChemSpider	7185
ECHA InfoCard	100.002.544
EC Number	202-798-8
PubChem CID	7465
UNII	9F59JOO816
CompTox Dashboard (EPA)	DTXSID5042299
- InChI: InChI=1S/C9H12O/c1-7(2)8-3-5-9(10)6-4-8/h3-7,10H,1-2H3 Key: YQUQWHNMBPIWGK-UHFFFAOYSA-N
- SMILES: CC(C)C1=CC=C(C=C1)O

Properties
Chemical formula	C_{9}H_{12}O
Molar mass	136.194 g·mol^{−1}
Appearance	white solid
Melting point	62 °C (144 °F; 335 K)
Boiling point	230 °C (446 °F; 503 K)

Hazards
- GHS labelling
Pictograms	(GHS05: Corrosive) (GHS07: Exclamation mark)
Signal word	Danger
Hazard statements	H302, H312, H314, H332
Precautionary statements	P260, P264, P270, P271, P280, P301+P317, P301+P330+P331, P302+P352, P302+P361+P354, P304+P340, P305+P354+P338, P316, P317, P321, P330, P362+P364, P363, P405, P501
- Except where otherwise noted, data are given for materials in their standard state (at 25 °C [77 °F], 100 kPa). Infobox references

4-Isopropylphenol is an organic compound with the formula (CH_{3})_{2}CHC_{6}H_{4}OH. The molecule consists of an isopropyl group affixed to the para (p-) position of phenol. The compound, a white solid, is produced by the alkylation of phenol with propylene and is relevant to the production of the commodity chemical bisphenol A (BPA). The preparation of isopropylphenols by alkylation of phenol and various cresols with propylene has been well developed. Depending on the catalysts and conditions, products can include, aside from 4-isopropylphenol, 2-isopropylphenol, 2,6-diisopropylphenol, and 2,4,6-2-triisopropylphenol.

The compound undergoes catalytic dehydrogenation to give p-isopropenylphenol.
