= Nutmeg oil =

Distilled oil from the nutmeg seed

Nutmeg oil is a volatile essential oil from nutmeg (Myristica fragrans). The oil is colorless or light yellow and smells and tastes of nutmeg. It contains numerous components of interest to the oleochemical industry. The essential oil consists of approximately 90% terpene hydrocarbons. Prominent components are sabinene, α-pinene, β-pinene, and limonene. A major oxygen-containing component is terpinen-4-ol. The oil also contains small amounts of various phenolic compounds and aromatic ethers, e.g. myristicin, elemicin, safrole, and methyl eugenol. The phenolic fraction is considered main contributor to the characteristic nutmeg odor. However, in spite of the low oil content, the characteristic composition of nutmeg oil makes it a valuable product for food, cosmetic and pharmaceutical industries. Therefore, an improved process for its extraction would be of industrial interest.

== General uses ==
The essential oil is obtained by the steam distillation of ground nutmeg and is used heavily in the perfumery and pharmaceutical industries. The nutmeg essential oil is used as a natural food flavoring in baked goods, syrups, beverages (e.g. Coca-Cola), sweets, etc. It can then be used to replace ground nutmeg, as it leaves no particles in the food. The essential oil is also used in the cosmetic and pharmaceutical industries for instance in toothpaste and as a major ingredient in some cough syrups.

== See also ==
- Nutmeg as a drug
- PiHKAL § Essential amphetamines
