= Tiglyl-CoA =

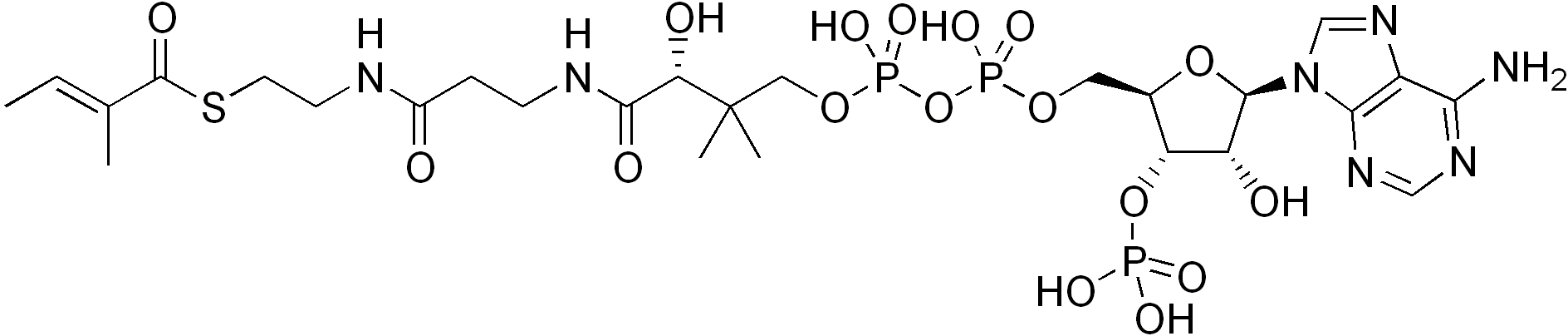

Names
- IUPAC name 3′-O-Phosphonoadenosine 5′-[(3R)-3-hydroxy-2,2-dimethyl-4-({3-[(2-{[(2E)-methylbut-2-enoyl]sulfanyl}ethyl)amino]-3-oxopropyl}amino)-4-oxobutyl dihydrogen diphosphate]
- Systematic IUPAC name O^{1}-{[(2R,3S,4R,5R)-5-(6-Amino-9H-purin-9-yl)-4-hydroxy-3-(phosphonooxy)oxolan-2-yl]methyl} O^{3}-[(3R)-3-hydroxy-2,2-dimethyl-4-({3-[(2-{[(2E)-methylbut-2-enoyl]sulfanyl}ethyl)amino]-3-oxopropyl}amino)-4-oxobutyl] dihydrogen diphosphate

Identifiers
| CAS Number | 6247-62-7 |
| 3D model (JSmol) | Interactive image |
| ChEBI | CHEBI:15478 |
| ChemSpider | 4947725 |
| KEGG | C03345 |
| MeSH | tiglyl-coenzyme+A |
| PubChem CID | 6443760 |
| CompTox Dashboard (EPA) | DTXSID101027515 |
- InChI: InChI=1S/C26H42N7O17P3S/c1-5-14(2)25(38)54-9-8-28-16(34)6-7-29-23(37)20(36)26(3,4)11-47-53(44,45)50-52(42,43)46-10-15-19(49-51(39,40)41)18(35)24(48-15)33-13-32-17-21(27)30-12-31-22(17)33/h5,12-13,15,18-20,24,35-36H,6-11H2,1-4H3,(H,28,34)(H,29,37)(H,42,43)(H,44,45)(H2,27,30,31)(H2,39,40,41)/b14-5+/t15-,18-,19-,20+,24-/m1/s1 Key: PMWATMXOQQZNBX-DKBZLLMOSA-N
- SMILES: C\C=C(/C)\C(=O)SCCNC(=O)CCNC(=O)[C@@H](C(C)(C)COP(=O)(O)OP(=O)(O)OC[C@@H]1[C@H]([C@H]([C@@H](O1)N2C=NC3=C2N=CN=C3N)O)OP(=O)(O)O)O

Properties
| Chemical formula | C_{26}H_{42}N_{7}O_{17}P_{3}S |
| Molar mass | 849.63 g/mol |
- Except where otherwise noted, data are given for materials in their standard state (at 25 °C [77 °F], 100 kPa). verify (what is ?) Infobox references

Tiglyl-CoA is an intermediate in the metabolism of isoleucine. It is an inhibitor of N-acetylglutamate synthetase.
