= Eugenol =

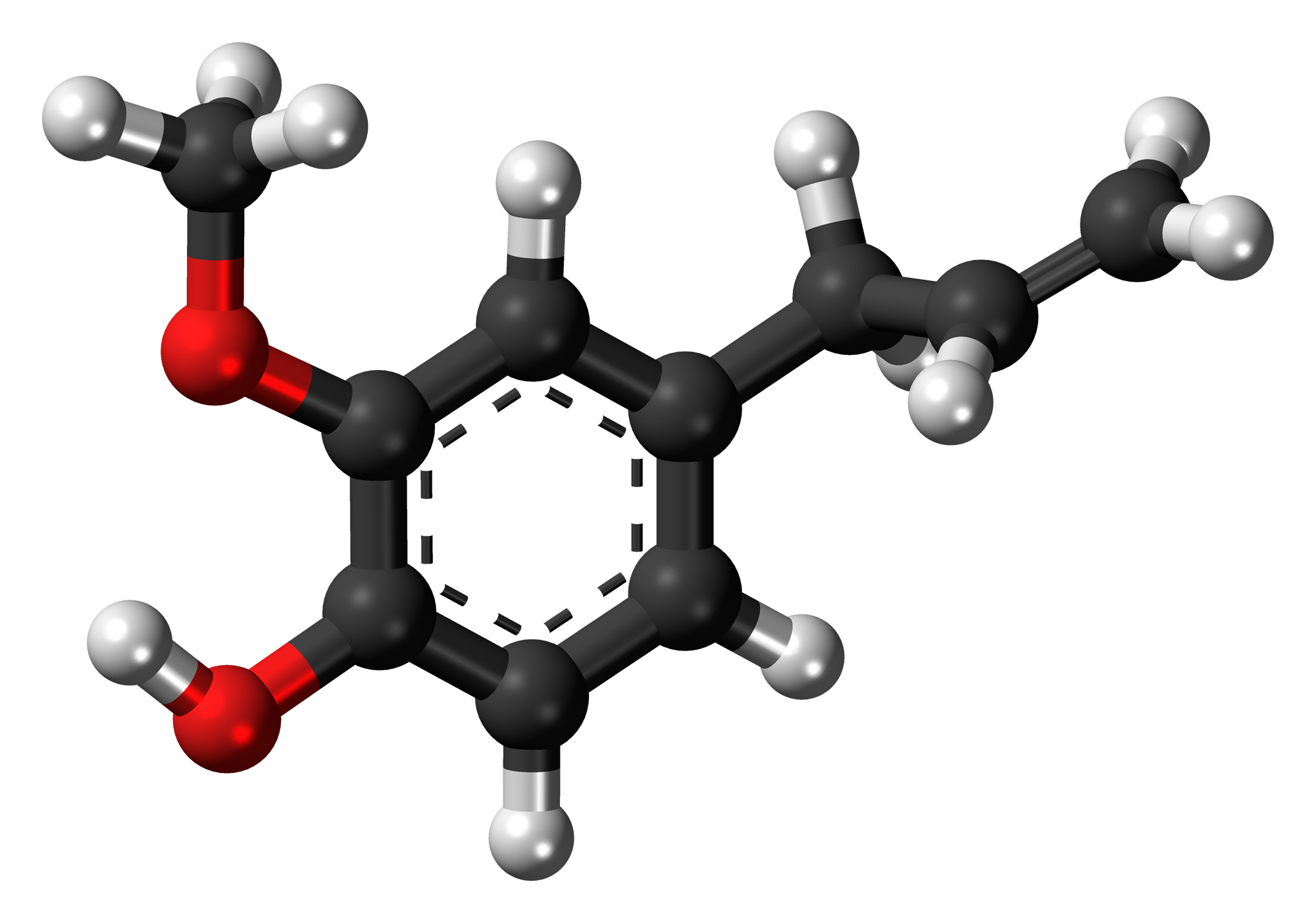

Names
- Preferred IUPAC name 2-Methoxy-4-(prop-2-en-1-yl)phenol
- Other names: 4-Allyl-2-methoxyphenol; 2-Methoxy-4-(2-propenyl)phenol; Eugenic acid; Caryophyllic acid; 1-Allyl-3-methoxy-4-hydroxybenzene; Allylguaiacol; 2-Methoxy-4-allylphenol; 4-Allylcatechol-2-methyl ether

Identifiers
CAS Number	97-53-0
3D model (JSmol)	Interactive image
Beilstein Reference	1366759
ChEBI	CHEBI:4917
ChEMBL	ChEMBL42710
ChemSpider	13876103
ECHA InfoCard	100.002.355
EC Number	202-589-1
IUPHAR/BPS	2425
KEGG	D04117
PubChem CID	3314
UNII	3T8H1794QW
CompTox Dashboard (EPA)	DTXSID9020617
- InChI: InChI=1S/C10H12O2/c1-3-4-8-5-6-9(11)10(7-8)12-2/h3,5-7,11H,1,4H2,2H3 Key: RRAFCDWBNXTKKO-UHFFFAOYSA-N; InChI=1/C10H12O2/c1-3-4-8-5-6-9(11)10(7-8)12-2/h3,5-7,11H,1,4H2,2H3 Key: RRAFCDWBNXTKKO-UHFFFAOYAJ
- SMILES: Oc1ccc(cc1OC)CC=C

Properties
Chemical formula	C_{10}H_{12}O_{2}
Molar mass	164.204 g·mol^{−1}
Density	1.06 g/cm^{3}
Melting point	−7.5 °C (18.5 °F; 265.6 K)
Boiling point	254 °C (489 °F; 527 K)
Acidity (pK_{a})	10.19 at 25 °C
Magnetic susceptibility (χ)	−1.021×10^{−4} cm^{3}/mol
Viscosity	9.12 mPa·s at 20 °C; 5.99 mPa·s at 30 °C

Hazards
NFPA 704 (fire diamond)	2 1 0
Flash point	104 °C (219 °F; 377 K)

Related compounds
Related compounds	2-Phenethyl propionate
- Except where otherwise noted, data are given for materials in their standard state (at 25 °C [77 °F], 100 kPa). verify (what is ?) Infobox references

Eugenol /ˈjuːdʒɪnɒl/ is an allyl chain-substituted guaiacol, a member of the allylbenzene class of chemical compounds. It is a colorless to pale yellow, aromatic oily liquid extracted from certain essential oils especially from clove, nutmeg, cinnamon, basil and bay leaf. It is present in concentrations of 80–90% in clove bud oil and at 82–88% in clove leaf oil. Containing eugenol, clove essential oil is obtained from unopened clove buds. Eugenol has a pleasant, spicy, clove-like scent. The name is derived from Eugenia caryophyllata, the former Linnaean nomenclature term for cloves. The currently accepted name is Syzygium aromaticum.

== Biosynthesis ==
The biosynthesis of eugenol begins with the amino acid tyrosine. L-tyrosine is converted to p-coumaric acid by the enzyme tyrosine ammonia lyase (TAL). From here, p-coumaric acid is converted to caffeic acid by p-coumarate 3-hydroxylase using oxygen and NADPH. S-Adenosyl methionine (SAM) is then used to methylate caffeic acid, forming ferulic acid, which is in turn converted to feruloyl-CoA by the enzyme 4-hydroxycinnamoyl-CoA ligase (4CL). Next, feruloyl-CoA is reduced to coniferyl aldehyde by cinnamoyl-CoA reductase (CCR). Coniferyl aldehyde is then further reduced to coniferyl alcohol by cinnamyl-alcohol dehydrogenase (CAD) or sinapyl-alcohol dehydrogenase (SAD). Coniferyl alcohol is then converted to an ester in the presence of the substrate CH_{3}COSCoA, forming coniferyl acetate. Finally, coniferyl acetate is converted to eugenol via the enzyme eugenol synthase 1 and the use of NADPH.

Eugenol is a metabolite of caleicine, the active compound found in Calea ternifolia, and is thought to cause the sedative and hallucinogenic state C. ternifolia can induce.

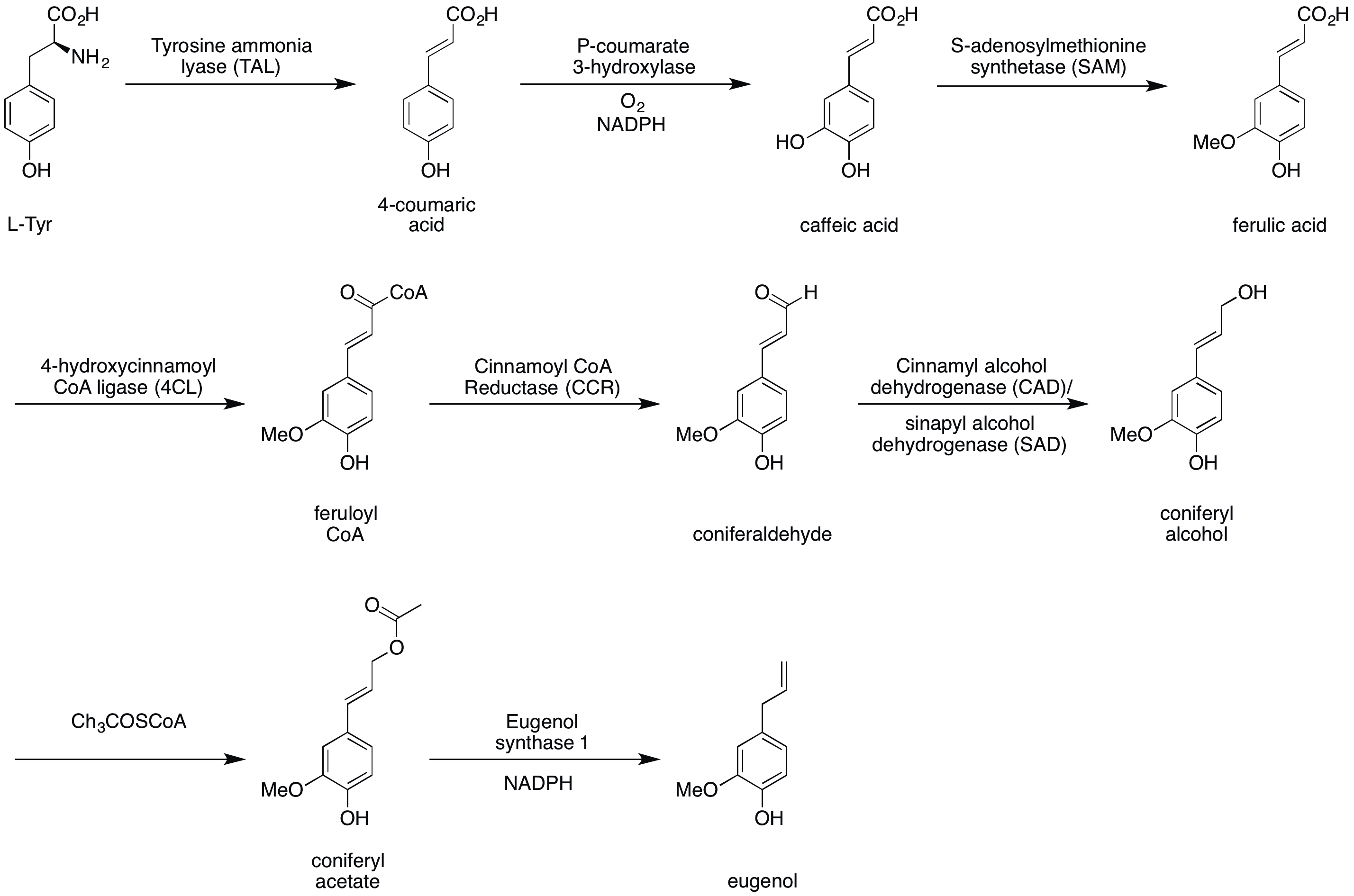
Biosynthesis of eugenol

== Pharmacology ==
Eugenol and thymol possess general anesthetic properties. Like many other anesthetic agents, these 2-alkyl(oxy)phenols act as positive allosteric modulators of the GABA_{A} receptor. Although eugenol and thymol are too toxic and not potent enough to be used clinically, these findings led to the development of 2-substituted phenol anesthetic drugs, including propanidid (later withdrawn) and the widely used propofol. Eugenol and the structurally similar myristicin have the common property of inhibiting MAO-A and MAO-B in vitro.

In humans, complete excretion occurs within 24 hours and metabolites are mostly conjugates of eugenol.

== Uses ==
=== Humans ===
Eugenol is used as a flavor or aroma ingredient in teas, meats, cakes, perfumes, cosmetics, flavorings, and essential oils. It is also used as a local antiseptic and anaesthetic. Eugenol can be combined with zinc oxide to form zinc oxide eugenol which has restorative and prosthodontic applications in dentistry. For persons with a dry socket as a complication of tooth extraction, packing the dry socket with a eugenol-zinc oxide paste on iodoform gauze is effective for reducing acute pain. Eugenol-zinc oxide paste is also used for root canal sealing.

=== Insects and fish ===
It is attractive to males of various species of orchid bees, which apparently gather the chemical to synthesize pheromones; it is commonly used as bait to attract and collect these bees for study. It also attracts female cucumber beetles.

Eugenol and isoeugenol, which both are floral volatile scent compounds, are catalyzed by a single type of enzyme in the genus Gymnadenia and the gene encoding for this enzyme is the first functionally characterized gene in these species. Eugenol is an ingredient in some insecticides.

Clove oil is common as an anesthetic for use on aquarium fish as well as on wild fish when sampled for research and management purposes. Where readily available, it presents a humane method to euthanize sick and diseased fish either by direct overdose or to induce sleep before an overdose of eugenol.

=== Other ===
Eugenol is an ingredient in some fungicides and weed control products used in agricultural practices in the European Union. It is used in hundreds of household products, such as pesticides, pet care, laundry, cleaning, and paper or vehicle products.

== Toxicity ==
Lesser side effects of eugenol toxicity that may not be considered a full overdose: sedation, dizziness, hallucinations, delirium, mild respiratory depression, nausea, and muscle spasms.

Taken orally in high doses for chronic periods, eugenol may cause liver toxicity. An overdose is possible, causing a wide range of symptoms, such as hematuria (blood in urine), convulsions, diarrhea, unconsciousness, heavy respiratory depression, tachycardia (rapid heart rate), or acute kidney injury. N-acetylcysteine may be used to treat people with eugenol or clove oil overdose.

== As an allergenic ==
Eugenol is subject to restrictions on its use in perfumery, as some people may become sensitised to it, however, the degree to which eugenol can cause an allergic reaction in humans is disputed.

Eugenol is a component of balsam of Peru, to which some people are allergic. When eugenol is used in dental preparations such as surgical pastes, dental packing, and dental cement, it may cause contact stomatitis and allergic cheilitis. The allergy can be discovered via a patch test.

== Natural occurrence ==
Eugenol naturally occurs in numerous plants, including the following:

- Pimenta dioica (Allspice)
- Artemisia absinthium (Wormwood)
- Syzygium aromaticum (Clove)
- Cinnamomum (Cinnamon)
- Cinnamomum tamala (Indian bay leaf)
- Anethum graveolens (Dill)
- Geum urbanum (Wood avens)
- Zingiber officinale (Ginger)
- Illicium anisatum (Japanese star anise)
- Laurus nobilis (Bay laurel)
- Melissa officinalis (Lemon balm)
- Myristica fragrans (Nutmeg)
- Ocimum basilicum (Sweet basil)
- Ocimum gratissimum (African basil)
- Ocimum tenuiflorum (syn. Ocimum sanctum, Tulsi or Holy basil)
- Vanilla

== See also ==
- Caleicine
- Zinc oxide eugenol
- Pseudoisoeugenol
- Isoeugenol
- Acetyleugenol
- Ferulic acid
- PiHKAL § Essential amphetamines
