= Methoxyeugenol =

Names
- IUPAC name 2,6-dimethoxy-4-prop-2-enylphenol

Identifiers
CAS Number	6627-88-9
3D model (JSmol)	Interactive image
ChEBI	CHEBI:86562
ChEMBL	ChEMBL2059292
ChemSpider	196968
ECHA InfoCard	100.026.910
EC Number	229-600-2
PubChem CID	226486
UNII	8VF00YWP89
CompTox Dashboard (EPA)	DTXSID30216470
- InChI: InChI=1S/C11H14O3/c1-4-5-8-6-9(13-2)11(12)10(7-8)14-3/h4,6-7,12H,1,5H2,2-3H3 Key: FWMPKHMKIJDEMJ-UHFFFAOYSA-N
- SMILES: COC1=CC(=CC(=C1O)OC)CC=C

Properties
Chemical formula	C_{11}H_{14}O_{3}
Molar mass	194.230 g·mol^{−1}

Hazards
- GHS labelling
Pictograms	(GHS07: Exclamation mark)
Signal word	Warning
Hazard statements	H315, H317, H319, H335
Precautionary statements	P261, P264, P271, P272, P280, P302+P352, P304+P340, P305+P351+P338, P312, P321, P332+P313, P333+P313, P337+P313, P362, P363, P403+P233, P405, P501
- Except where otherwise noted, data are given for materials in their standard state (at 25 °C [77 °F], 100 kPa). Infobox references

Methoxyeugenol is a natural occurring allylbenzene and eugenol derivative. It is found in toxic Japanese star anise pericarp and leaves as well as in nutmeg crude extract but not in nutmeg essential oil. It also activates PPAR-gamma in vivo.

== See also ==
- Acetyleugenol
