= Methyl isoeugenol =

Names
- Preferred IUPAC name 1,2-dimethoxy-4-[(E)-prop-1-enyl]benzene
- Other names Isomethyleugenol; Methylisoeugenol; 4-Propenylveratrole

Identifiers
CAS Number	6379-72-2 (E)
3D model (JSmol)	Interactive image
ChEBI	CHEBI:6877
ChemSpider	553362
ECHA InfoCard	100.002.023
KEGG	C10478
PubChem CID	637776
UNII	J6M6C71VVR (E)
CompTox Dashboard (EPA)	DTXSID0052621
- InChI: InChI=1S/C11H14O2/c1-4-5-9-6-7-10(12-2)11(8-9)13-3/h4-8H,1-3H3/b5-4+
- SMILES: CC=CC1=CC(OC)=C(OC)C=C1

Properties
Chemical formula	C_{11}H_{14}O_{2}
Molar mass	178.231 g·mol^{−1}
- Except where otherwise noted, data are given for materials in their standard state (at 25 °C [77 °F], 100 kPa). Infobox references

Methyl isoeugenol (isomethyleugenol) is a phenylpropanoid, the methyl ether of isoeugenol, found in certain essential oils. It can occur as both (E)- and (Z)-isomers.

== Biosynthesis ==
In the wildflower Clarkia breweri, methyl isoeugenol is produced from isoeugenol by the enzyme (iso)eugenol O-methyltransferase. This uses the cofactor, S-adenosyl methionine (SAM) to provide the methyl group.

isoeugenol
+ SAM
methyl isoeugenol
+ SAH

== See also ==
- Methyl eugenol
- PiHKAL § Essential amphetamines
