= Perceptual disturbance =

Perceptual disturbance or perceptual disorder may refer to:

- Perceptual disturbances or distortions, for instance with hallucinogenic drugs
- Hallucinations, for instance visual or auditory hallucinations
- Sensory processing disorder
  - Auditory processing disorder
- Depersonalization-derealization disorder
- Hallucinogen persisting perception disorder
