= Angelic acid =

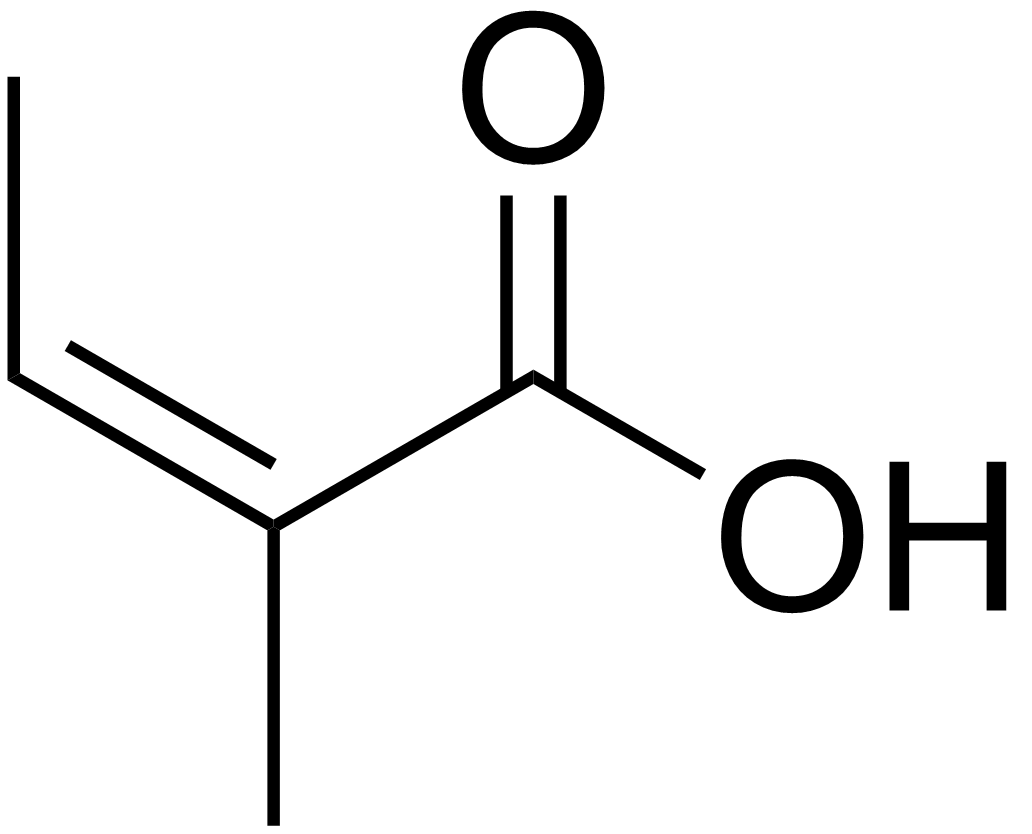
- Chemical structure of angelic acid

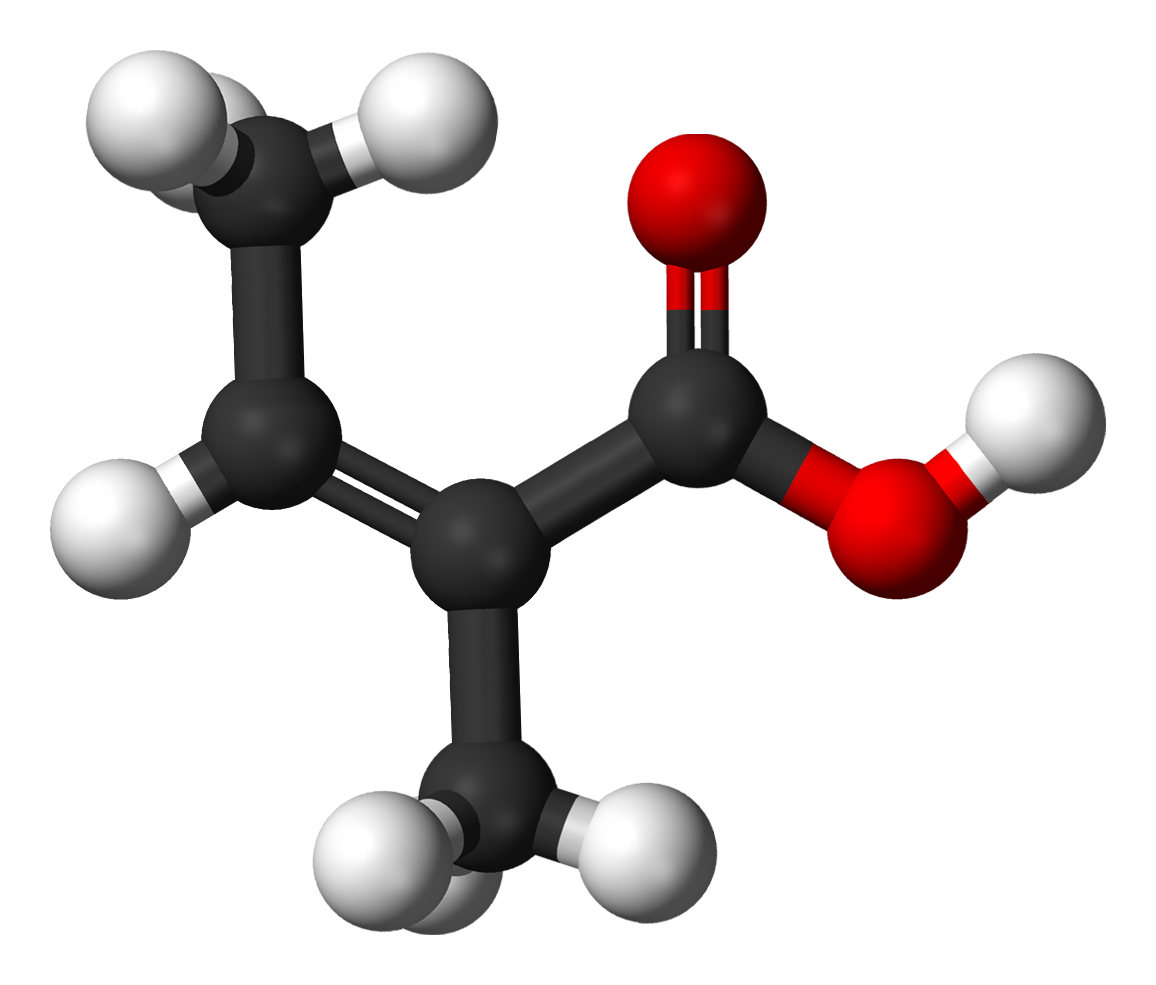
- Ball-and-stick model of angelic acid

Names
- Preferred IUPAC name (2Z)-2-Methylbut-2-enoic acid
- Other names (Z)-2-Methylbut-2-enoic acid

Identifiers
CAS Number	565-63-9
3D model (JSmol)	Interactive image; Interactive image
ChEBI	CHEBI:36431
ChEMBL	ChEMBL55941
ChemSpider	559009
ECHA InfoCard	100.008.441
PubChem CID	643915
UNII	54U4ZPB36F
CompTox Dashboard (EPA)	DTXSID80897430
- InChI: InChI=1S/C5H8O2/c1-3-4(2)5(6)7/h3H,1-2H3,(H,6,7)/b4-3- Key: UIERETOOQGIECD-ARJAWSKDSA-N
- SMILES: C/C=C(C)\C(O)=O; O=C(O)\C(=C/C)C

Properties
Chemical formula	C_{5}H_{8}O_{2}
Molar mass	100.117 g·mol^{−1}
Melting point	45.5 °C (113.9 °F; 318.6 K)
Boiling point	185 °C (365 °F; 458 K)
- Except where otherwise noted, data are given for materials in their standard state (at 25 °C [77 °F], 100 kPa). verify (what is ?) Infobox references

Angelic acid is a monocarboxylic unsaturated organic acid, mostly found in the plants of the family Apiaceae. It is a volatile solid with a biting taste and pungent sour odor. It is the cis isomer of 2-methyl-2-butenoic acid, which easily converts to the trans isomer, tiglic acid, upon heating or reaction with inorganic acids. The reverse transformation occurs much less readily. The salts and esters of angelic acid are called angelates. Angelic acid esters are the active components of herbal medicine used against a wide range of various health disturbances including pains, fever, gout, heartburn, etc.

== Name and discovery ==
Angelic acid was first isolated by the German pharmacist Ludwig Andreas Buchner (1813–1897) in 1842 from the roots of garden Angelica.

== Occurrence ==
Angelic acid occurs in the roots of many plants, especially of the family Apiaceae. These plants include Angelica archangelica, Peucedanum ostruthium (masterwort), Levisticum officinale (lovage), Ferula moschata (herb Sumbul) and Laserpitium latifolium. In the latter plant, it is present in the resin called laserpicium, and the oil of carrot also contains angelic acid. Sumbul plants might contain not angelic acid itself, but a larger complex which breaks into angelic acid upon processing. The acid can also be extracted from the oil of chamomile flowers, and 85% of Roman chamomile (Anthemis nobilis) oil consists of esters of angelic and tiglic acids; it also contains isobutyl angelate and amyl angelate. The acid content is highest in Angelica archangelica where it is about 0.3%.

== Properties ==
Angelic acid is a volatile solid with a biting taste and pungent sour odor. It crystallizes in colorless monoclinic prisms which dissolve rapidly in alcohol or hot water and slowly in cold water. Angelic and tiglic acid are cis and trans isomers of 2-methyl-2-butenoic acid, respectively. The former can be entirely converted to the latter by boiling for about 40 hours, by reaction with sulfuric and other acids, by heating with a base to a temperature above 100 °C, or simply by storing the acid for about 25 years. The reverse transformation occurs much less readily; it can be induced by ultraviolet light, but not with visible light. The conversion rate is low and only 0.36 g of angelic acid could be obtained from 13 g of tiglic acid after 43-day irradiation with a 500-watt lamp. Being the cis isomer, angelic acid has a lower melting point and higher acid dissociation constant than tiglic acid, in accordance to usually observed trends.

Angelic acid reacts with hydrobromic acid and bromine producing bromovaleric and dibromovaleric acids, respectively, with a yield of 60–70%. Chlorovaleric and iodovaleric acids are obtained using hydrochloric and hydroiodic acids, respectively. The salts of angelic acid are called angelates. Angelates of alkaline earth metals M have a general formula M(C_{5}H_{7}O_{2})_{2} and form white, water-soluble crystals.

== Applications ==
The angelic acid esters of sesquiterpene alcohols, such as petasin, are the active chemical behind the strong pain-relieving and spasmolytic action of extracts from the plant butterbur. Roman chamomile, in which esters of angelic and tiglic acids are the principal components, was used as a sedative and tonic, and as a medicine against nervous problems, fever, colic, heartburn, loss of appetite, gout, headache and other health disturbances.
