= N-acetylglutamate synthetase =

N-acetylglutamate synthetase may refer to:

- N-Acetylglutamate synthase (EC 2.3.1.1)
- Glutamate N-acetyltransferase (EC 2.3.1.35)
