= 2-Phenethyl propionate =

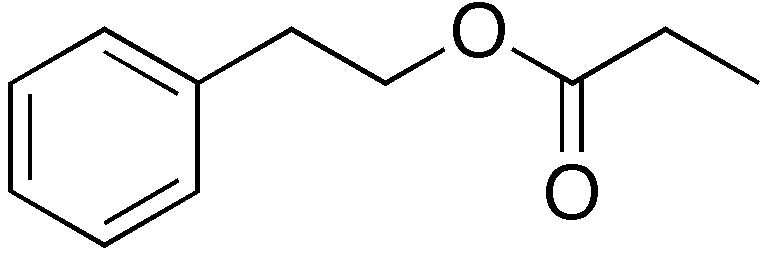
- Chemical structure of phenethyl propionate

Names
- Preferred IUPAC name 2-Phenylethyl propanoate
- Other names 2-Phenethyl propanoate; Phenylethyl propionate; Phenethyl propanoate

Identifiers
CAS Number	122-70-3
3D model (JSmol)	Interactive image
ChemSpider	8125
ECHA InfoCard	100.004.153
PubChem CID	31225
UNII	9VFI60EUHW
CompTox Dashboard (EPA)	DTXSID6035156
- InChI: InChI=1S/C11H14O2/c1-3-11(12)13-9(2)10-7-5-4-6-8-10/h4-9H,3H2,1-2H3 Key: WCIQNYOXLZQQMU-UHFFFAOYSA-N; InChI=1/C11H14O2/c1-3-11(12)13-9(2)10-7-5-4-6-8-10/h4-9H,3H2,1-2H3 Key: WCIQNYOXLZQQMU-UHFFFAOYAV
- SMILES: O=C(OC(c1ccccc1)C)CC

Properties
Chemical formula	C_{11}H_{14}O_{2}
Molar mass	178.231 g·mol^{−1}
Odor	Floral, rose, sweet
Density	1.007 g/mL
Boiling point	245 °C (473 °F; 518 K)

Hazards
Flash point	113 °C (235 °F; 386 K)

Related compounds
Related compounds	Eugenol
- Except where otherwise noted, data are given for materials in their standard state (at 25 °C [77 °F], 100 kPa). verify (what is ?) Infobox references

2-Phenethyl propionate, also known as phenethyl propanoate or phenylethyl propionate, is the ester of phenethyl alcohol and propionic acid. It can be found in peanuts.

It has shown antifungal activity and was tested as a pesticide. It is used in some preparations used in the management of bed bugs and in other pesticide products. In the U.S it is considered a "minimal risk pesticide" and can be used as a pesticide without any registration.
