= Actinidiolide =

- Skeletal formula of actinidiolide ((7aR)-7a-meth)

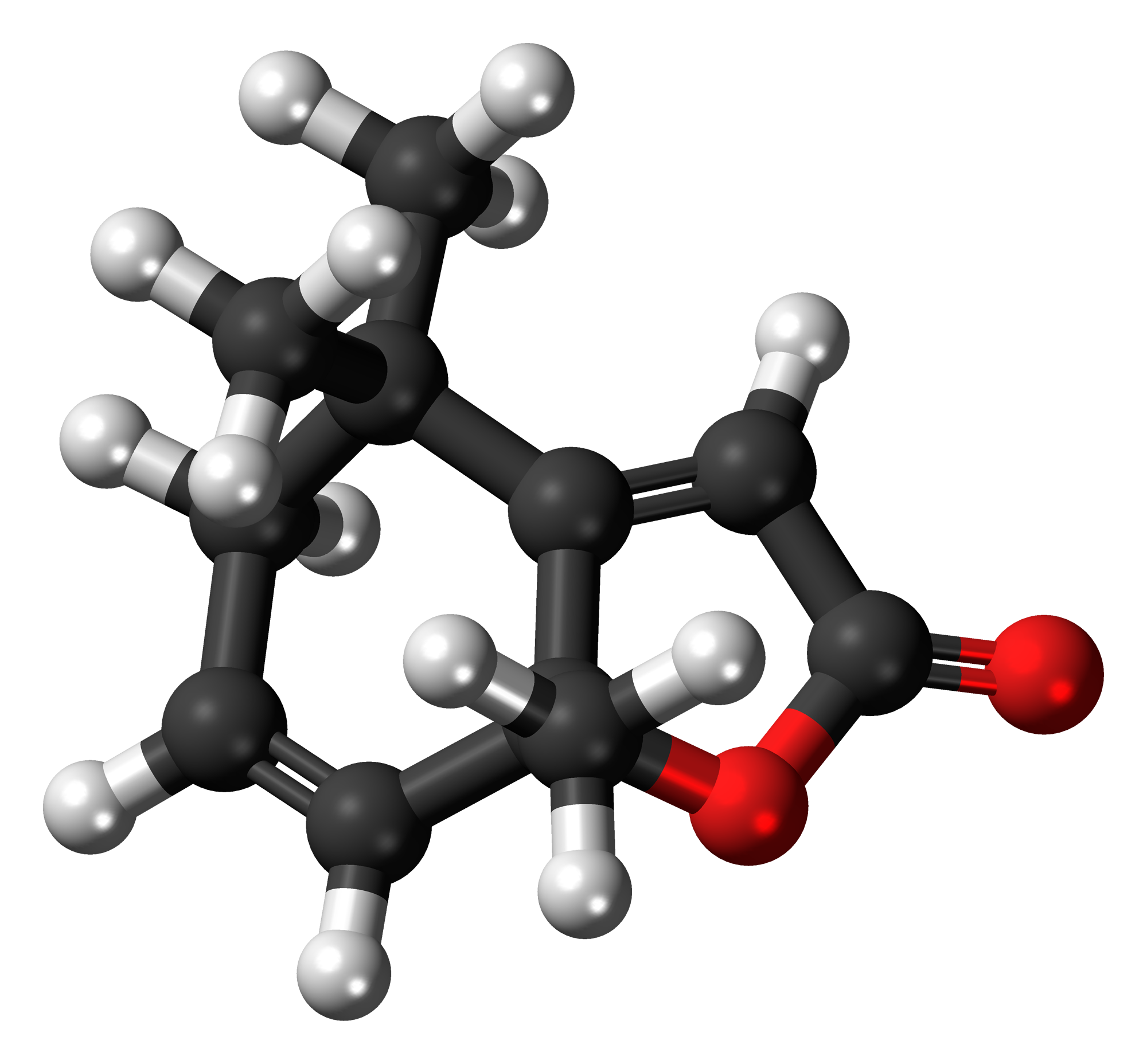

Names
- Preferred IUPAC name 4,4,7a-Trimethyl-5,7a-dihydro-1-benzofuran-2(4H)-one
- Other names 4,4,7a-Trimethyl-4,5-dihydrobenzofuran-2(7aH)-one; 4,4,7a-Trimethyl-5H-1-benzofuran-2-one

Identifiers
CAS Number	17063-17-1
3D model (JSmol)	Interactive image
ChemSpider	10250059 (S); 13078154
PubChem CID	11084442 (S); 11062957 (R); 15558330
UNII	VDZ7K4U8Y2
- InChI: InChI=1S/C11H14O2/c1-10(2)5-4-6-11(3)8(10)7-9(12)13-11/h4,6-7H,5H2,1-3H3/t11-/m1/s1 Key: VGQSMHFBCKKQHB-LLVKDONJSA-N; InChI=1/C11H14O2/c1-10(2)5-4-6-11(3)8(10)7-9(12)13-11/h4,6-7H,5H2,1-3H3
- SMILES: CC12OC(=O)C=C1C(C)(C)CC=C2

Properties
Chemical formula	C_{11}H_{14}O_{2}
Molar mass	178.231 g·mol^{−1}
- Except where otherwise noted, data are given for materials in their standard state (at 25 °C [77 °F], 100 kPa). verify (what is ?) Infobox references

Actinidiolide is a cat attractant.
