= MMDMA =

Chemical compound

Clinical data
- Other names: 5-Methoxy-MDMA; 5-MeO-MDMA; 5-Methoxy-3,4-methylenedioxy-N-methylamphetamine; 3-Methoxy-4,5-methylenedioxy-N-methylamphetamine;
- Routes of administration: Oral
- ATC code: None

Legal status
- Legal status: UK: Class A; US: Unscheduled(but possession or sale may be illegal under the Federal Analogue Act in the U.S., and under similar bills in other countries)

Identifiers
- IUPAC name: 1-(7-methoxy-1,3-benzodioxol-5-yl)-N-methylpropan-2-amine
- CAS Number: 172518-52-4
- PubChem CID: 547094
- ChemSpider: 476196
- UNII: GR5ZT8ZV9F
- CompTox Dashboard (EPA): DTXSID701027670

Chemical and physical data
- Formula: C_{12}H_{17}NO_{3}
- Molar mass: 223.272 g·mol^{−1}
- 3D model (JSmol): Interactive image
- SMILES: COC1=CC(CC(C)NC)=CC2=C1OCO2
- InChI: InChI=1S/C12H17NO3/c1-8(13-2)4-9-5-10(14-3)12-11(6-9)15-7-16-12/h5-6,8,13H,4,7H2,1-3H3; Key:XEULPLUJSUSGMX-UHFFFAOYSA-N

5-Methoxy-3,4-methylenedioxymethamphetamine (MMDMA; 5-MeO-MDMA) is a designer drug of the substituted methylenedioxyphenethylamine (MDxx) class. Little is known about its effects and it has not been formally studied in animals.

== See also ==
- Substituted methylenedioxyphenethylamine
