= Myristicin =

Chemical compound

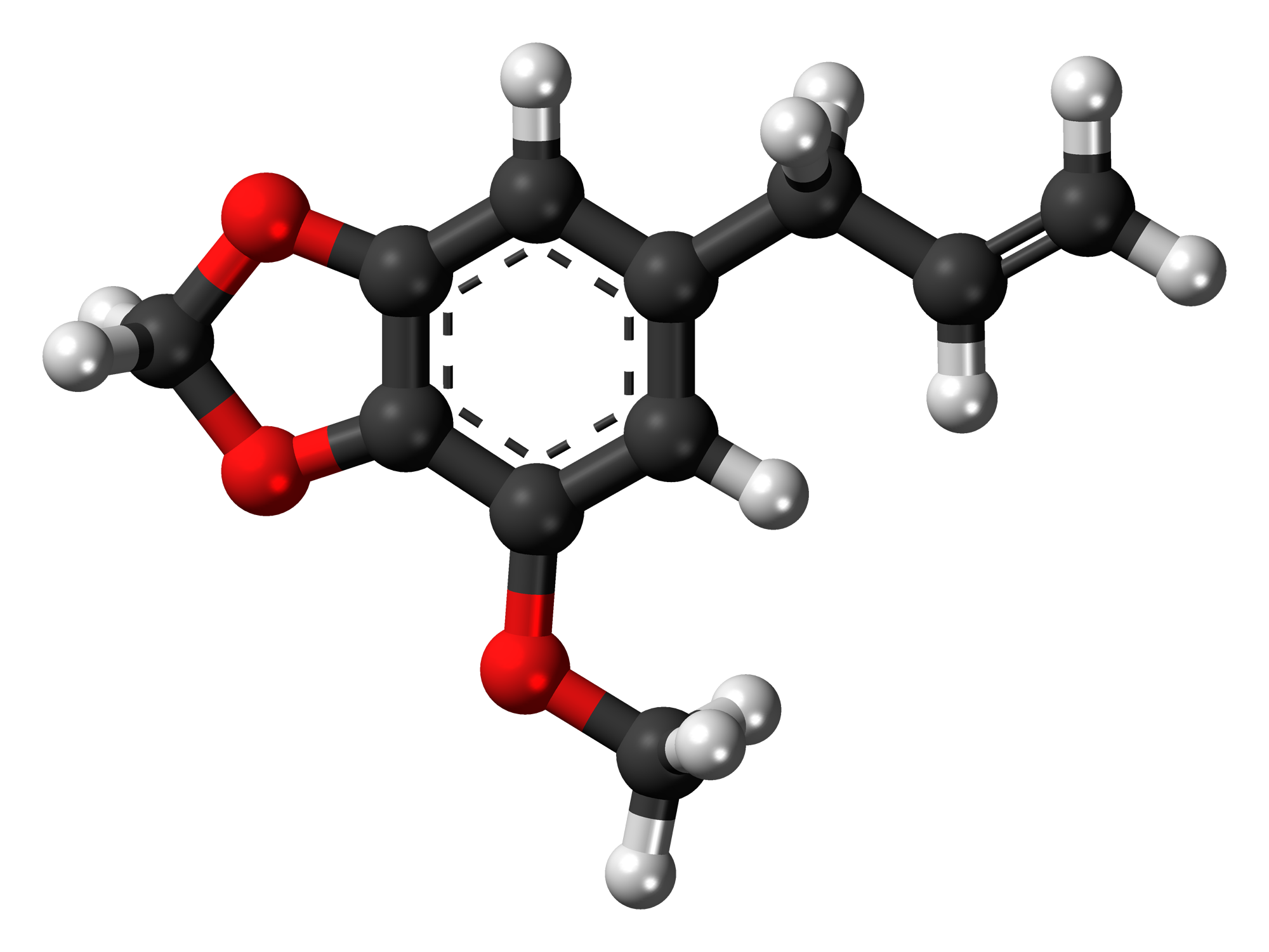

Clinical data
- Other names: 3-Methoxy-4,5-methylenedioxyphenylprop-2-ene; 3-Methoxy-4,5-methylenedioxy-allylbenzene; 5-Methoxy-3,4-methylenedioxy-allylbenzene
- Dependence liability: None
- Addiction liability: Low
- Routes of administration: Oral
- Drug class: Hallucinogen; Monoamine oxidase inhibitor

Legal status
- Legal status: UK: Under Psychoactive Substances Act; US: Unscheduled; UN: Unscheduled; In general: uncontrolled

Identifiers
- IUPAC name: 4-methoxy-6-prop-2-enyl-1,3-benzodioxole
- CAS Number: 607-91-0
- PubChem CID: 4276
- ChemSpider: 4125
- UNII: 04PD6CT78W
- KEGG: C10480
- ChEMBL: ChEMBL481044
- CompTox Dashboard (EPA): DTXSID1025693
- ECHA InfoCard: 100.009.225

Chemical and physical data
- Formula: C_{11}H_{12}O_{3}
- Molar mass: 192.214 g·mol^{−1}
- 3D model (JSmol): Interactive image
- SMILES: COC1=CC(=CC2=C1OCO2)CC=C
- InChI: InChI=1S/C11H12O3/c1-3-4-8-5-9(12-2)11-10(6-8)13-7-14-11/h3,5-6H,1,4,7H2,2H3; Key:BNWJOHGLIBDBOB-UHFFFAOYSA-N

Myristicin is a naturally occurring compound (an allylbenzene) found in common herbs and spices such as nutmeg. It is an insecticide, and has been shown to enhance the effectiveness of other insecticides.

When ingested in high doses, myristicin may produce hallucinogenic effects, and can be converted to MMDMA in controlled chemical synthesis. It interacts with many enzymes and signaling pathways in the body, and may have dose-dependent cytotoxicity in living cells. Myristicin is listed in the Hazardous Substances Data Bank.

== Natural occurrence ==
Myristicin can be found in the essential oil of nutmeg, black pepper, kawakawa, and many members of the Umbelliferae family, including anise, carrots, parsley, celery, dill, and parsnip.

Trace amounts have also been isolated from a variety of plant species including Ridolfia segetum (harvest fennel), species of the Oenanthe genus (water dropworts), some species of the Lamiaceae family (mint family), Cinnamomum glanduliferum (Nepal camphor tree), and Piper mullesua ("Hill Pepper").

Depending on the conditions of growth and storage of the plant, a high quality nutmeg (Myristica fragrans) seed can contain up to 13 mg of myristicin per 1 gram.

== Uses ==
=== Insecticide ===
Isolated myristicin has proven an effective insecticide against many agricultural pests, including Aedes aegypti mosquito larvae, Spilosoma obliqua (hairy caterpillars), Epilachna varivestis (Mexican bean beetles), Acyrthosiphon pisum (pea aphids), mites, and Drosophila melanogaster (fruit flies). Myristicin was shown to be an effective repellent, and to cause mortality via direct and systemic exposure. It also displayed a synergistic effect when administered to insects in combination with existing insecticides.

=== Psychoactive effects and toxicity ===
The chemical structure of myristicin is similar to some amphetamines, and it may be capable of producing psychoactive effects. Normal levels of intake of myristicin from spices in food is unlikely to cause these effects. Myristicin can be used in the chemical synthesis of amphetamine derivatives such as the designer drug MMDMA that is similar in chemical structure and effect to MDMA. Out of the common spices that contain myristicin, nutmeg has a high relative concentration of the compound, and therefore is used to exploit the effects of myristicin. At a minimum dose of about 5 grams of nutmeg powder, symptoms of nutmeg intoxication can begin to emerge. Nutmeg intoxication may produce dizziness, drowsiness, and confusion, although in higher amounts, it may have effects similar to deliriants.

The effects of nutmeg consumed in large doses may involve myristicin: 1–7 hours following ingestion, symptoms include disorientation, giddiness, stupor, and stimulation of the central nervous system leading to euphoria. Also occurring are mild to intense hallucinations (similar to those induced by deliriants: walls and ceiling glitching or breathing), disorientation to time and surroundings, dissociation, feelings of levitation, loss of consciousness, tachycardia, weak pulse, anxiety, and hypertension. Symptoms of nutmeg intoxication further include nausea, abdominal pain, vomiting, minor to severe muscle spasms (severe in extreme overdose), headache, dryness of mouth, mydriasis or miosis, hypotension, shock, and potentially death.

Myristicin poisoning can be detected by testing levels of myristicin in the blood. There are no known antidotes for myristicin poisoning, and treatment focuses on symptom management and potential sedation in cases of extreme delirium or aggravation.

== Pharmacology ==
=== Pharmacodynamics ===
Myristicin interferes with multiple signaling pathways and enzyme processes in the body. It is known to be a weak inhibitor of monoamine oxidase (MAO), an enzyme in humans that metabolizes neurotransmitters (for example, serotonin, dopamine, epinephrine, and norepinephrine). It lacks the basic nitrogen atom that is typical of monoamine oxidase inhibitors (MAOIs), potentially explaining a weaker inhibitory effect.

While smaller concentrations of MAOIs may not cause problems, there are additional warnings regarding drug interactions. Those taking antidepressants that are MAOIs (such as phenelzine, isocarboxazid, tranylcypromine or selegiline) or taking selective serotonin reuptake inhibiting (SSRI) antidepressants should avoid essential oils rich in myristicin, such as that of nutmeg and anise.

Myristicin does not produce the head-twitch response, a behavioral proxy of psychedelic effects, in rodents.

In laboratory studies, myristicin is cytotoxic. Specifically, it stimulates cytochrome c release, which activates caspase cascades and induces early apoptosis in the cells. Myristicin has also been shown to inhibit cytochrome P450 enzymes, which are responsible for metabolizing a variety of substrates including hormones and toxins, allowing these substrates to accumulate.

The pharmacology of myristicin and other nutmeg constituents has been reviewed.

=== Pharmacokinetics ===
Metabolism of myristicin yields 3-methoxycatechol and enzymatically forms 5-allyl-1-methoxy-2,3-dihydroxybenzene (oxidation of the methylenedioxy group). Myristicin is also transformed into demethylenylmyristicin, dihydroxymyristicin, and elemicin is transformed into O-demethylelemicin, O-demethyldihydroxyelemicin, and safrole.

There has been speculation that myristicin might be converted into the psychedelic MMDA, but this has not been demonstrated in humans.

However, two nitrogen-containing metabolites of myristicin have been identified in the urine of rats and guinea pigs following oral or intraperitoneal administration. The major basic ninhydrin-positive urinary metabolite of myristicin in the rat is 3-piperidyl-1-(3′methoxy-4′,5′-methylenedioxyphenyl)-1-propanone, while the major basic ninhydrin-positive urinary metabolite of the guinea pig is 3-pyrrolidinyl-1-(3′methoxy-4′,5′-methylenedioxyphenyl)-1-propanone. Equivalent nitrogen-containing metabolites have also been identified for safrole and elemicin, including the dimethylamine, piperidine and pyrrolidine forms. Whether these aminated metabolites are involved in the reported psychoactive and hallucinogenic effects of botanical sources of these allylbenzenes like nutmeg is not known.

== Chemistry ==
=== Properties ===
Myristicin is insoluble in water, and soluble in ethanol, ether, and benzene.

=== Chemical precursor ===
Synthesis of MMDMA from myristicin.

With a chemical structure resembling amphetamines and other precursors, myristicin can also be used to synthesize psychoactive amphetamines. Under controlled conditions, myristicin isolated from nutmeg oil can be converted into MMDMA, a synthetic "designer drug" that is less potent than MDMA but produces comparable stimulant and hallucinogenic effects.

=== Analogues ===
Structural comparison of myristicin, amphetamine and derivatives

Non-aminated analogues of myristicin include safrole, elemicin, methyleugenol, and asarone, among others. Aminated analogues of myristicin include MMDA, MMDMA, MDA, and MDMA, among others.

== History ==
Myristicin was first described in the scientific literature by 1890.

== See also ==
- Nutmeg as a drug
- Elemicin
- PiHKAL § Essential amphetamines
