= Tiglic acid =

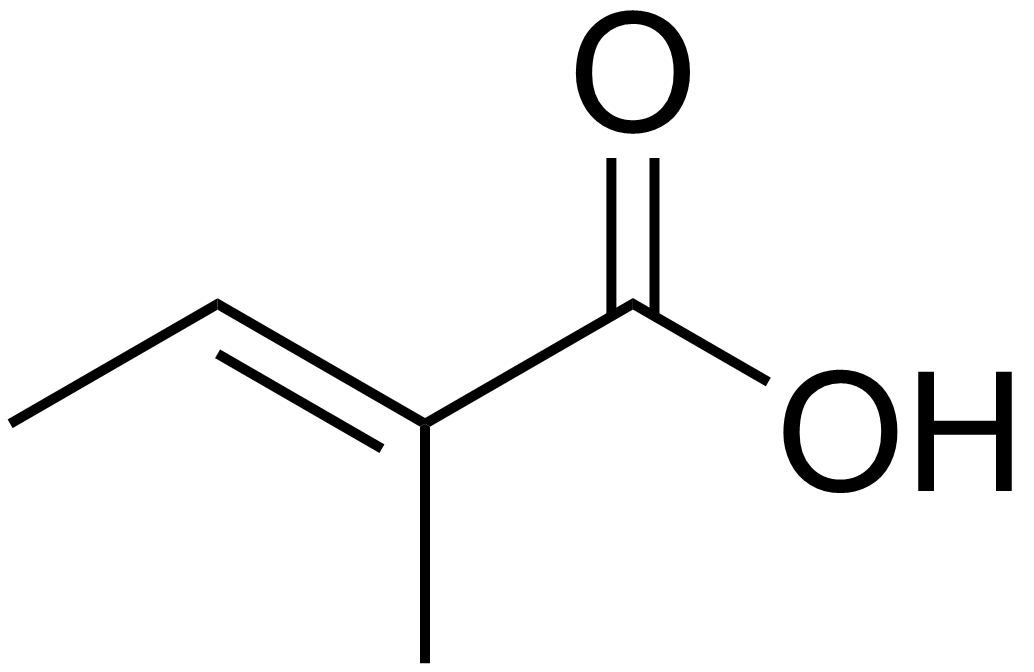
- Chemical structure of tiglic acid

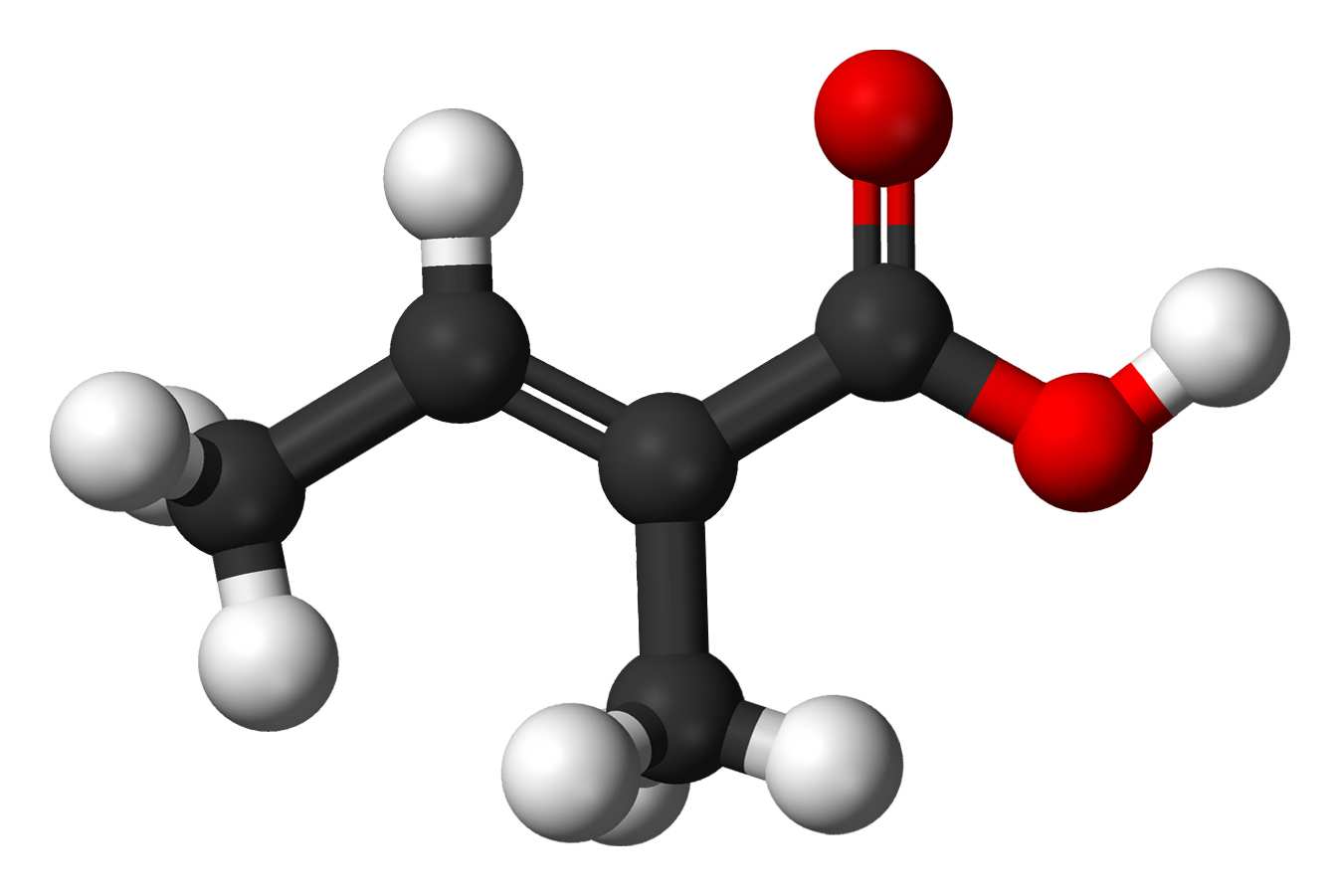
- Ball-and-stick model of tiglic acid

Names
- Preferred IUPAC name (2E)-2-Methylbut-2-enoic acid
- Other names (E)-2-Methylbut-2-enoic acid Cevadic acid Sabadillic acid Tiglinic acid

Identifiers
| CAS Number | 80-59-1 |
| 3D model (JSmol) | Interactive image |
| ChEBI | CHEBI:9592 |
| ChemSpider | 111629 |
| ECHA InfoCard | 100.001.178 |
| IUPHAR/BPS | 6499 |
| PubChem CID | 125468 |
| UNII | I5792N03HC |
| CompTox Dashboard (EPA) | DTXSID80883257 |
- InChI: InChI=1S/C5H8O2/c1-3-4(2)5(6)7/h3H,1-2H3,(H,6,7)/b4-3+ Key: UIERETOOQGIECD-ONEGZZNKSA-N; InChI=1/C5H8O2/c1-3-4(2)5(6)7/h3H,1-2H3,(H,6,7)/b4-3+ Key: UIERETOOQGIECD-ONEGZZNKBL
- SMILES: O=C(O)/C(=C/C)C

Properties
| Chemical formula | C_{5}H_{8}O_{2} |
| Molar mass | 100.116 g/mol |
| Density | 0.9641 g/cm^{3} (76 °C) |
| Melting point | 63.5 to 64 °C (146.3 to 147.2 °F; 336.6 to 337.1 K) |
| Boiling point | 198.5 °C (389.3 °F; 471.6 K) |
| Acidity (pK_{a}) | 4.96 |
- Except where otherwise noted, data are given for materials in their standard state (at 25 °C [77 °F], 100 kPa). verify (what is ?) Infobox references

Tiglic acid is a monocarboxylic unsaturated organic acid. It is found in croton oil and in several other natural products. It has also been also isolated from the defensive secretion of certain beetles.

== Properties and uses ==
Tiglic acid has a double bond between the second and third carbons of the chain. Tiglic acid and angelic acid form a pair of cis-trans isomers. Tiglic acid is a volatile and crystallizable substance with a sweet, warm, spicy odour. It is used in making perfumes and flavoring agents. The salts and esters of tiglic acid are called tiglates.

== Toxicity ==
Tiglic acid is a skin and eye irritant. The inhalation of the substance causes respiratory tract irritation. It is listed on the Toxic Substances Control Act (TSCA).

== Names and discovery ==
In 1819 Pelletier and Caventou isolated a peculiar volatile and crystallizable acid from the seeds of Schoenocaulon officinalis, a Mexican plant of family Melanthaceae (also called cevadilla or sabadilla). Consequently, the substance was named sabadillic or cevadic acid. In 1865 it was found to be identical with B. F. Duppa and Edward Frankland's methyl-crotonic acid. In 1870 Geuther and Fröhlich prepared an acid from croton oil to which they gave the name tiglic acid (or tiglinic acid) after Croton tiglium (Linn.), specific name of the croton oil plant. The compound was shown to be identical with the previously described methyl-crotonic acid.

== See also ==
- Tiglyl-CoA, a thioester with coenzyme A
- Duboisia myoporoides produces an alkaloid known as tigloidine.
