= Contact stomatitis =

- Other names: Contact lichenoid reaction, lichenoid amalgam reaction, oral mucosal cinnamon reaction
- Specialty: Dermatology

Contact stomatitis is inflammation or pain of the oral mucosa caused by external stimuli. It is characterized by cutaneous lesions that may be located where the offending agent contacts the mucosa for a prolonged time. Oftentimes it presents in the mouth after contact with hot food or from ill-fitted dentures or other irritant. Consequently, patients may seek resolve from their dentist rather than a dermatologist. Unlike with allergic contact stomatitis, the skin requires no previous exposure to a stimulant before crafting an immune reaction.

== See also ==
- Contact urticaria
- List of cutaneous conditions
