= Nutmeg (band) =

Swedish band

NUTMEG
- Origin: Örnsköldsvik, Sweden
- Genres: Alternative, indie rock, grunge
- Years active: 2000–present
- Label: Iconic Noise
- Members: Henrik Lundqvist (lead vocals); Johan Andersson (drums); Markus Ingberg (bass); Johan Bergqvist (guitars/backing vocals); Jonas Träskelin (keyboards)
- Website: http://nutmegmusic.net

Nutmeg is a band from Sweden. They formed in 2000 in Örnsköldsvik. In 2006 Johan Bergqvist joined the roster on guitar.

The band has toured throughout Sweden over the years, including prestigious gigs at Emmaboda Festival, the Rookie Festival in Hultsfred and Trästocksfestivalen.

Their debut album The Trigger was released in 2009 on the indie label Iconic Noise, and was rewarded 5/5 in Sweden's largest music magazine "Groove", which earned it a placed in the "Top 10 albums released 2009".

The second album is under production and will be released later this year.

== Discography ==
=== Albums ===
- 2009: The Trigger
