= 2-Methylbutanoic acid =

Carboxylic acid

Names
- Preferred IUPAC name 2-Methylbutanoic acid
- Other names 2-Methylbutyric acid Methylethylacetic acid

Identifiers
| CAS Number | R/S: 116-53-0; R: 32231-50-8; S: 1730-91-2 |
| 3D model (JSmol) | R/S: Interactive image |
| Beilstein Reference | 1098537 |
| ChEBI | R/S: CHEBI:37070; R: CHEBI:45525; S: CHEBI:38655 |
| ChEMBL | R/S: ChEMBL1160012 |
| ChemSpider | R/S: 8012; R: 5323416; S: 395556 |
| ECHA InfoCard | 100.003.769 |
| EC Number | R/S: 204-145-2 |
| KEGG | R/S: C18319 |
| PubChem CID | R/S: 8314; R: 6950479; S: 448893 |
| UNII | R/S: PX7ZNN5GXK; S: 5N31513I0N |
| CompTox Dashboard (EPA) | R/S: DTXSID5021621 |
- InChI: R/S: InChI=1S/C5H10O2/c1-3-4(2)5(6)7/h4H,3H2,1-2H3,(H,6,7) Key: WLAMNBDJUVNPJU-UHFFFAOYSA-N; R: Key: WLAMNBDJUVNPJU-SCSAIBSYSA-N; S: Key: WLAMNBDJUVNPJU-BYPYZUCNSA-N
- SMILES: R/S: CCC(C)C(=O)O

Properties
| Chemical formula | C_{5}H_{10}O_{2} |
| Appearance | Clear colorless liquid |
| Density | 0.94 g/cm^{3} (20 °C) |
| Melting point | −90 °C (−130 °F; 183 K) |
| Boiling point | 176 °C (349 °F; 449 K) |
| log P | 1.18 |

Hazards
- GHS labelling
| Pictograms | (GHS05: Corrosive) (GHS07: Exclamation mark) |
| Signal word | Danger |
| Hazard statements | H302, H312, H314 |
| Precautionary statements | P260, P264, P270, P280, P301+P312, P301+P330+P331, P302+P352, P303+P361+P353, P304+P340, P305+P351+P338, P310, P312, P321, P322, P330, P363, P405, P501 |
| Flash point | 83 °C (181 °F; 356 K) |
- Except where otherwise noted, data are given for materials in their standard state (at 25 °C [77 °F], 100 kPa). Infobox references

2-Methylbutanoic acid, also known as 2-methylbutyric acid, is a branched-chain alkyl carboxylic acid with the chemical formula CH_{3}CH_{2}CH(CH_{3})CO_{2}H. It is classified as a short-chain fatty acid. It exists in two enantiomeric forms, (R)- and (S)-2-methylbutanoic acid. (R)-2-methylbutanoic acid occurs naturally in cocoa beans and (S)-2-methylbutanoic occurs in many fruits such as apples and apricots, as well as in the scent of the orchid Luisia curtisii.

== History ==
2-Methylbutanoic acid is a minor constituent of Angelica archangelica and the perennial flowering plant valerian (Valeriana officinalis), where it co-occurs with valeric acid and isovaleric acid. The dried root of this plant has been used medicinally since antiquity. The chemical identity of all three compounds was first investigated in the 19th century by oxidation of the components of fusel alcohol, which includes the five-carbon amyl alcohols. Among the products isolated was a compound which gave a (+) rotation in polarised light, indicating it to be the (2S) isomer.

== Preparation ==
Racemic 2-methylbutanoic acid can readily be prepared by a Grignard reaction using 2-chlorobutane, magnesium and carbon dioxide. It was the target of the first enantioselective synthesis in 1904 when the German chemist W. Marckwald heated ethyl(methyl)malonic acid with the chiral base brucine and obtained an optically active product mixture. Either enantiomer of 2-methylbutanoic acid can now be obtained by asymmetric hydrogenation of tiglic acid using a ruthenium-BINAP catalyst.

== Reactions ==
The compound and its enantiomers react as typical carboxylic acids: they can form amide, ester, anhydride, and chloride derivatives. The acid chloride is commonly used as the intermediate to obtain the others.

== Uses ==
Racemic 2-methylbutanoic acid is a slightly volatile, colorless liquid with a pungent cheesy odor. The smell differs significantly between the two enantiomeric forms. (S)-2-Methylbutyric acid has a pleasantly sweet, fruity odor while (R)-2-methylbutanoic acid has a pervasive, cheesy, sweaty odor. The main use of the materials, and their esters, is therefore as flavours and food additives. The compounds' safety in this application was reviewed by an FAO and WHO panel, who concluded that there were no concerns at the likely levels of intake.

== Biology ==
Since 2-methylbutanoic acid and its esters are natural components of many foods, they are present in mammals including humans.

== See also ==
- 3-Methylbutanoic acid, an isomer
- Valeric acid, an isomer
