= Acetyleugenol =

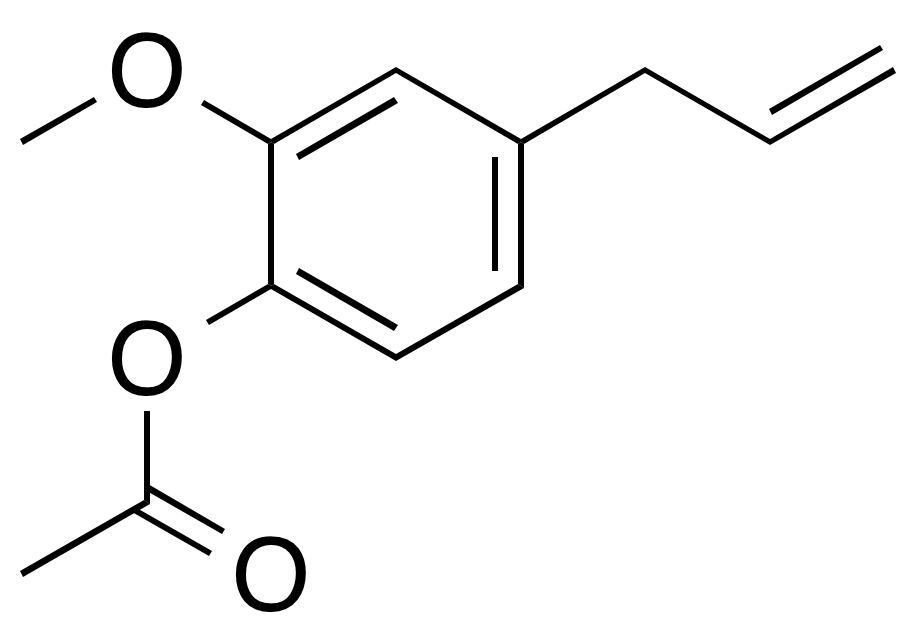

Names
- IUPAC name (2-methoxy-4-prop-2-enylphenyl) acetate
- Other names: Eugenol acetate; Eugenyl acetate; 4-Allyl-2-methoxyphenol acetate

Identifiers
CAS Number	93-28-7
3D model (JSmol)	Interactive image
ChEBI	CHEBI:34522
ChEMBL	ChEMBL108299
ChemSpider	6869
ECHA InfoCard	100.002.033
EC Number	202-235-6
KEGG	C14567
PubChem CID	7136
UNII	V9OSB376X8
CompTox Dashboard (EPA)	DTXSID5052624
- InChI: InChI=1S/C12H14O3/c1-4-5-10-6-7-11(15-9(2)13)12(8-10)14-3/h4,6-8H,1,5H2,2-3H3 Key: SCCDQYPEOIRVGX-UHFFFAOYSA-N
- SMILES: CC(=O)OC1=C(C=C(C=C1)CC=C)OC

Properties
Chemical formula	C_{12}H_{14}O_{3}
Molar mass	206.241 g·mol^{−1}
Density	1.0806 g/cm^{3}
Melting point	27 to 29 °C (81 to 84 °F; 300 to 302 K)
Boiling point	281.2 °C (538.2 °F; 554.3 K)

Related compounds
Related compounds	Methoxyeugenol; Methyleugenol
- Except where otherwise noted, data are given for materials in their standard state (at 25 °C [77 °F], 100 kPa). Infobox references

Acetyleugenol is a phenylpropanoid compound found in cloves. It is the second in abundance to the related compound eugenol in certain extract preparations. Like eugenol, its found in several plants such as Acacia nilotica and Piper betle and has similar antibacterial and antifungal properties on C. albicans and S. mutans. It inhibits aggregation of platelets and has partial agonistic activity on AhR.

== Uses ==
Acetyleugenol has characteristic odor reminiscent of cloves and thus used as fragrance.

== See also ==
- Methyleugenol
