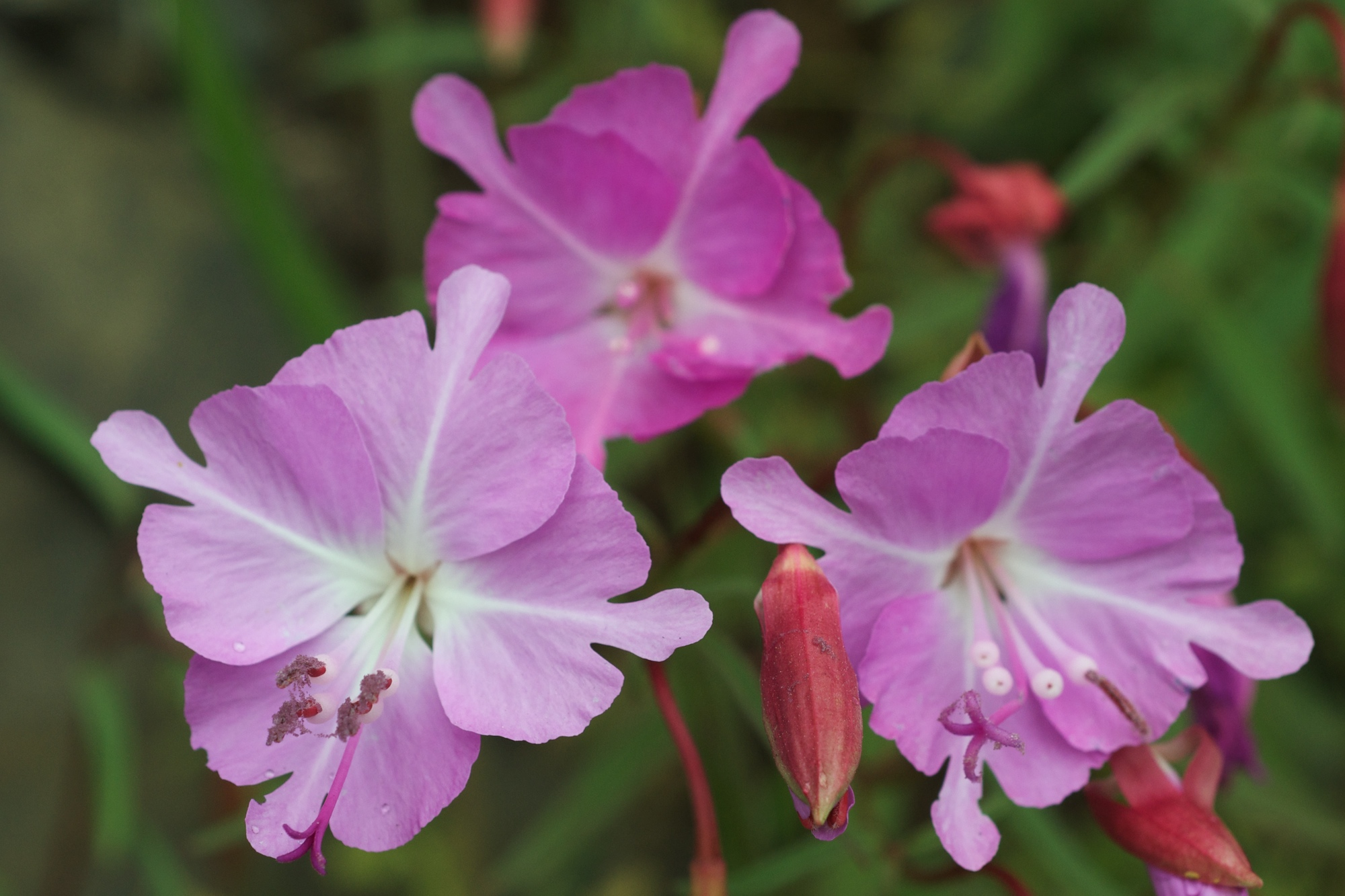

Scientific classification
- Kingdom: Plantae
- Clade: Tracheophytes
- Clade: Angiosperms
- Clade: Eudicots
- Clade: Rosids
- Order: Myrtales
- Family: Onagraceae
- Genus: Clarkia
- Species: C. breweri

Binomial name
- Clarkia breweri (A.Gray) Greene

= Clarkia breweri =

Species of flowering plant

Clarkia breweri is a species of wildflower known by the common names fairy fans and Brewer's clarkia. This rare plant is endemic to California, where it is known from only seven counties in the central part of the state. It produces short stems under 20 centimeters (8 in.) in height and sparse, narrow leaves. The distinctive flowers have four pink to lavender petals, each about 2 centimeters long and wide, with 3 odd lobes, the middle lobe being long and spoon-shaped.

Typical habitat is shale or serpentine scree.
