= Isoeugenol =

Names
- IUPAC name 2-Methoxy-4-[(E)-prop-1-enyl]phenol
- Other names 4-Hydroxy-3-methoxy-1-propenylbenzene; 2-Methoxy-4-propenylphenol; 4-Propenylguaiacol

Identifiers
CAS Number	97-54-1
3D model (JSmol)	(trans): Interactive image
ChEBI	CHEBI:18224
ChEMBL	ChEMBL445206
ChemSpider	21106129 (trans)
ECHA InfoCard	100.002.356
EC Number	202-590-7
KEGG	C10469
PubChem CID	7338
UNII	5M0MWY797U
CompTox Dashboard (EPA)	DTXSID7022413
- InChI: InChI=1S/C10H12O2/c1-3-4-8-5-6-9(11)10(7-8)12-2/h3-7,11H,1-2H3/b4-3+; (trans): InChI=1/C10H12O2/c1-3-4-8-5-6-9(11)10(7-8)12-2/h3-7,11H,1-2H3/b4-3+ Key: BJIOGJUNALELMI-ONEGZZNKBO
- SMILES: (trans): C/C=C/C1=CC(=C(C=C1)O)OC

Properties
Chemical formula	C_{10}H_{12}O_{2}
Molar mass	164.204 g·mol^{−1}
Appearance	Oily liquid
Density	1.080
Melting point	−10 °C (14 °F; 263 K)
Boiling point	266 °C (511 °F; 539 K)
Solubility in water	810 mg/L
Solubility	Soluble in most organic solvents
Vapor pressure	0.0135 mmHg

Pharmacology
ATCvet code	QN01AX94 (WHO)
Legal status	CA: ℞-only
- Except where otherwise noted, data are given for materials in their standard state (at 25 °C [77 °F], 100 kPa). Infobox references

Isoeugenol is a propenyl-substituted guaiacol. A phenylpropanoid, it occurs in the essential oils of plants such as ylang-ylang (Cananga odorata), and is a component of wood smoke and liquid smoke. It can be synthesized from eugenol and has been used in the manufacture of vanillin. It may occur as either the cis (Z) or trans (E) isomer. Trans (E) isoeugenol is crystalline while cis (Z) isoeugenol is a liquid. Isoeugenol is one of several phenolic compounds responsible for the mold-inhibiting effect of smoke on meats and cheeses.

== Allergy ==
Some individuals experience a hives-like reaction to long-term exposure to Isoeugenol, which is named as Fragrance in the ingredients of consumer products such as soaps, shampoos and detergents, bath tissue, and topical cosmetic applications. Sensitivity to isoeugenol (Fragrance) may be identified with a clinical patch test.

== See also ==
- PiHKAL § Essential amphetamines
