= Phenylpropanoids metabolism =

The biosynthesis of phenylpropanoids involves a number of enzymes.

== From amino acids to cinnamates ==
In plants, all phenylpropanoids are derived from the amino acids phenylalanine and tyrosine.

Phenylalanine ammonia-lyase (PAL, a.k.a. phenylalanine/tyrosine ammonia-lyase) is an enzyme that transforms L-phenylalanine and tyrosine into trans-cinnamic acid and p-coumaric acid, respectively.

Trans-cinnamate 4-monooxygenase (cinnamate 4-hydroxylase) is the enzyme that transforms trans-cinnamate into 4-hydroxycinnamate (p-coumaric acid). 4-Coumarate-CoA ligase is the enzyme that transforms 4-coumarate (p-coumaric acid) into 4-coumaroyl-CoA.

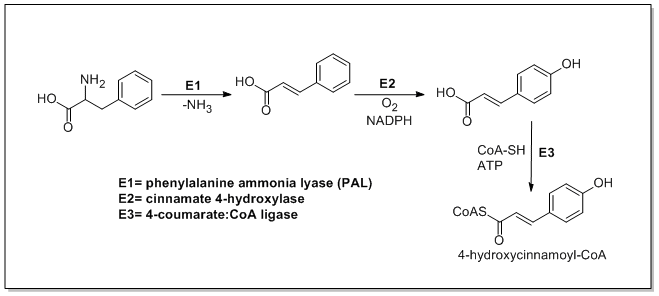

=== Enzymes associated with biosynthesis of hydroxycinnamic acids ===
- Cinnamyl-alcohol dehydrogenase (CAD), an enzyme that transforms cinnamyl alcohol into cinnamaldehyde
- Sinapine esterase, an enzyme that transforms sinapoylcholine into sinapate (sinapic acid) and choline
- Trans-cinnamate 2-monooxygenase, an enzyme that transforms trans-cinnamate (cinnamic acid) into 2-hydroxycinnamate
- Caffeate O-methyltransferase, an enzyme that transforms caffeic acid into ferulic acid
- Caffeoyl-CoA O-methyltransferase, an enzyme that transforms caffeoyl-CoA into feruloyl-CoA
- 5-O-(4-coumaroyl)-D-quinate 3'-monooxygenase, an enzyme that transforms trans-5-O-(4-coumaroyl)-D-quinate into trans-5-O-caffeoyl-D-quinate
- Sinapoylglucose—choline O-sinapoyltransferase, an enzyme that transforms 1-O-sinapoyl-beta-D-glucose into sinapoylcholine (sinapine)
- Sinapoylglucose—malate O-sinapoyltransferase, an enzyme that transforms 1-O-sinapoyl-beta-D-glucose into sinapoyl-(S)-malate
- Cinnamoyl-CoA reductase, an enzyme that transforms cinnamoyl-CoA from cinnamaldehyde

==== Conjugation enzymes ====
These enzymes conjugate phenylpropanoids to other molecules.

- 2-coumarate O-beta-glucosyltransferase, the enzyme that transforms trans-2-hydroxycinnamate into trans-beta-D-glucosyl-2-hydroxycinnamate
- Hydroxycinnamate 4-beta-glucosyltransferase, the enzyme that transforms p-coumaric acid into 4-O-beta-D-glucosyl-4-hydroxycinnamate
- Shikimate O-hydroxycinnamoyltransferase, the enzyme that transforms 4-coumaroyl-CoA into 4-coumaroylshikimate
- Quinate O-hydroxycinnamoyltransferase, the enzyme that transforms feruloyl-CoA into O-feruloylquinate
- Sinapate 1-glucosyltransferase, the enzyme that transforms sinapate (sinapic acid) into 1-sinapoyl-D-glucose
- Coniferyl-alcohol glucosyltransferase, the enzyme that transforms coniferyl alcohol into coniferin

==== Deconjugation enzymes ====
- Coniferin beta-glucosidase, in the glucosidase that transforms coniferin into coniferol

=== Stilbenoids biosynthesis ===
- Pinosylvin synthase, an enzyme that transforms pinosylvin from cinnamoyl-CoA
- Trihydroxystilbene synthase, an enzyme that transforms 4-coumaroyl-CoA to resveratrol.

An alternative bacterial ketosynthase-directed stilbenoids biosynthesis pathway exists in Photorhabdus bacterial symbionts of Heterorhabditis nematodes, producing 3,5-dihydroxy-4-isopropyl-trans-stilbene for antibiotic purposes.

=== Coumarins biosynthesis ===
- Scopoletin glucosyltransferase, the enzyme that transforms scopoletin into scopolin

=== Chalcones biosynthesis ===
4-Coumaroyl-CoA can be combined with malonyl-CoA to yield the true backbone of flavonoids, a group of compounds called chalconoids, which contain two phenyl rings. Naringenin-chalcone synthase is an enzyme that catalyzes the following conversion:

3-malonyl-CoA + 4-coumaroyl-CoA → 4 CoA + naringenin chalcone + 3 CO_{2}

=== Flavonoids biosynthesis ===
Conjugate ring-closure of chalcones results in the familiar form of flavonoids, the three-ringed structure of a flavone.

== Biodegradation ==
=== Hydroxycinnamic acids degradation ===
- Caffeate 3,4-dioxygenase is an enzyme that uses 3,4-dihydroxy-trans-cinnamate (caffeic acid) and oxygen to produce 3-(2-carboxyethenyl)-cis,cis-muconate.
