= Cinnamoyl-CoA reductase =

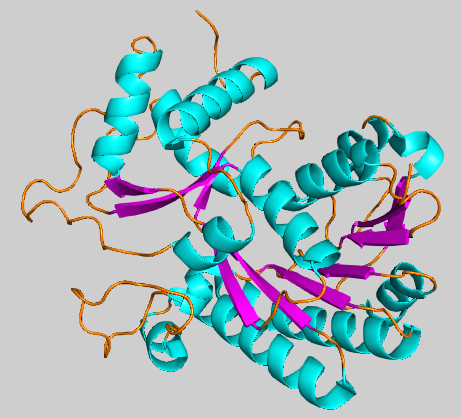
- Tertiary structure of CCR1 from Petunia x hybrida colored by secondary structural element, generated from 4R1S

Identifiers
- EC no.: 1.2.1.44
- CAS no.: 59929-39-4

Databases
- IntEnz: IntEnz view
- BRENDA: BRENDA entry
- ExPASy: NiceZyme view
- KEGG: KEGG entry
- MetaCyc: metabolic pathway
- PRIAM: profile
- PDB structures: RCSB PDB PDBe PDBsum
- Gene Ontology: AmiGO / QuickGO
Search
- PMC: articles
- PubMed: articles
- NCBI: proteins

Cinnamoyl-CoA reductase (EC 1.2.1.44), systematically named cinnamaldehyde:NADP+ oxidoreductase (CoA-cinnamoylating) but commonly referred to by the acronym CCR, is an enzyme that catalyzes the reduction of a substituted cinnamoyl-CoA to its corresponding cinnamaldehyde, utilizing NADPH and H^{+} and releasing free CoA and NADP^{+} in the process. Common biologically relevant cinnamoyl-CoA substrates for CCR include p-coumaroyl-CoA and feruloyl-CoA, which are converted into p-coumaraldehyde and coniferaldehyde, respectively, though most CCRs show activity toward a variety of other substituted cinnamoyl-CoA's as well. Catalyzing the first committed step in monolignol biosynthesis, this enzyme plays a critical role in lignin formation, a process important in plants both for structural development and defense response.

== Structure ==
The first confirmed CCR was isolated from soybean (Glycine max) in 1976. However, crystal structures have so far been reported for just three CCR homologs: Petunia x hybrida CCR1, Medicago truncatula CCR2, and Sorghum bicolor CCR1. While the enzyme crystallizes as an asymmetric dimer, it is thought to exist as a monomer in the cytoplasm, with each individual protein having a bilobal structure consisting of two domains surrounding a large, empty inner cleft for substrate binding. Typical CCRs have a molecular weight of around 36-38 kDa.

The domain containing the enzyme's N-terminus consists of several alpha helices and six beta strands that, in addition to a seventh strand connected to the C-terminus side of the enzyme, form a parallel beta sheet structure known as a Rossmann fold. In CCR, this fold structure, a common motif amongst proteins, serves as a binding domain for NADPH. The second domain, which consists of several alpha helices, beta strands, and extended loops, is responsible for binding the cinnamoyl-CoA substrate. These two domains are situated in such a way that the binding sites for NADPH and cinnamoyl-CoA are positioned closely to one another at the lobes' interface.

Though attempts to cocrystallize the enzyme with a bound cinnamoyl-CoA have thus far been unsuccessful, molecular docking studies indicate that the CoA segment of these molecules folds around to bind along the outer part of the inter-domain cleft, while the phenyl-containing portion of these substrates likely binds in the deepest part of the cleft. This inner part of the pocket contains several amino acids with nonpolar side chains necessary for stabilization of the hydrophobic phenyl ring in addition to a tyrosine residue important for hydrogen bond formation with the ring's 4-hydroxyl group. The particular identities of the nonpolar residues are believed to play a critical role in determining substrate specificity.

== Mechanism ==
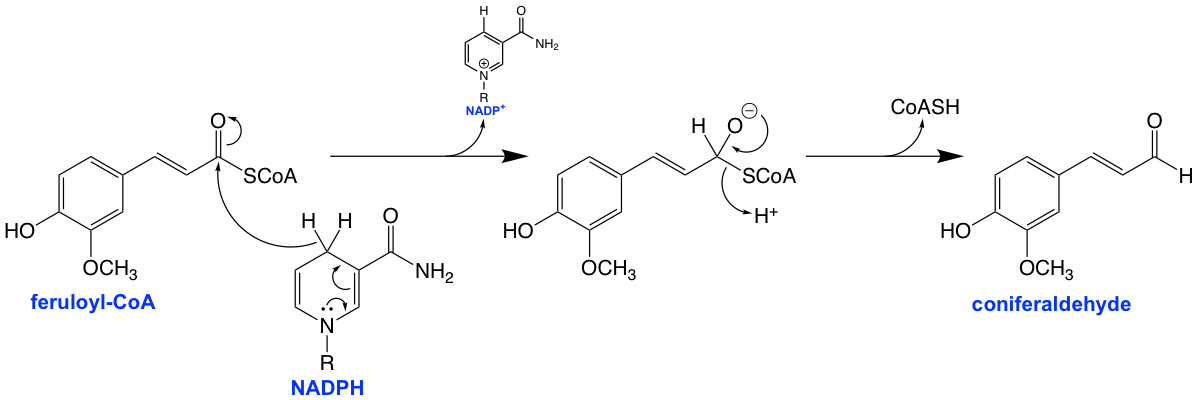
Mechanism for the reduction of feruloyl-CoA to coniferaldehyde. Names of depicted molecules are given in blue below their corresponding structures.

The mechanism for the reduction of the CoA thioester to the aldehyde involves a hydride transfer to the carbonyl carbon from NADPH, forming a tetrahedral intermediate with a formal negative charge on the oxygen atom. This negative charge is thought to be stabilized partially via hydrogen bonding with the hydrogen atoms of nearby tyrosine and serine side chains. The serine and tyrosine residues are conserved across all CCRs as part of a catalytic triad along with lysine, which is thought to control the pK_{a} of the tyrosine via electrostatic interactions with the ribose group of the NADPH.

The tetrahedral intermediate then collapses, kicking out the CoA and forming an aldehyde as the final product. The thiolate of the CoA is protonated either as it leaves by a nearby residue or after it is free from the binding pocket and out of the enzyme all-together; the exact mechanism is currently unclear, but evidence suggests that a cysteine residue may play the role of thiolate proton donor.

== Biological Function ==
Phylogenomic analysis indicates that enzymes with true CCR activity first evolved in the ancestor(s) of land plants. Most if not all modern land plants and all vascular plants are believed to have at least one functional CCR, an absolute requirement for any plant species with lignified tissues. Most CCR homologs are highly expressed during development, especially in stem, root, and xylem cells which require the enhanced structural support provided by lignin. However, certain CCRs are not constitutively expressed throughout development and are only up-regulated during enhanced lignification in response to stressors such as pathogen attack.

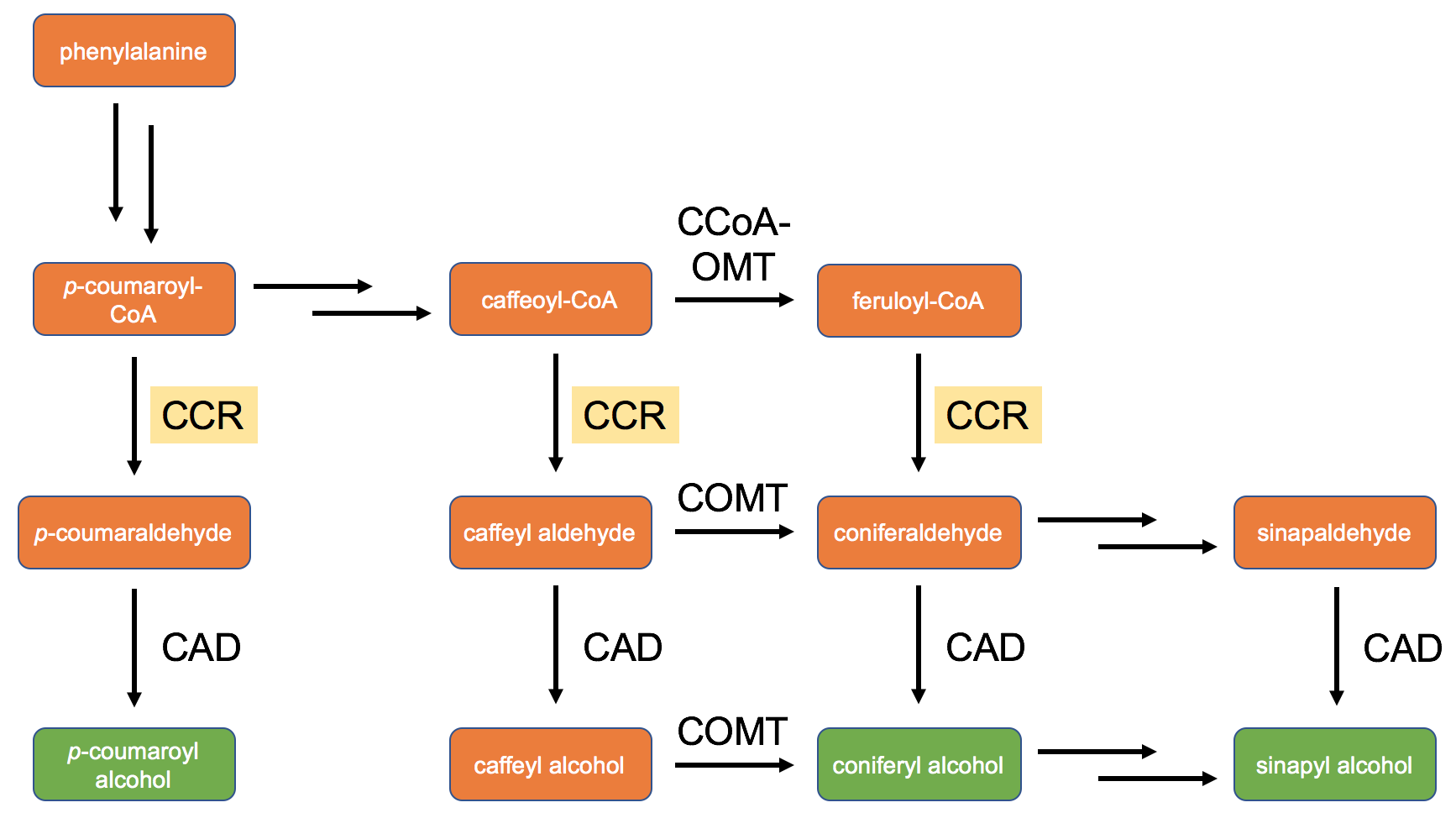
Current model of monolignol biosynthesis in land plants. Three most common lignin monomers shown in green, all other compounds shown in orange. CCR step highlighted. CCoA-OMT: caffeoyl-CoA O-methyltransferase; CAD: cinnamyl alcohol dehydrogenase; COMT: caffeate O-methyltransferase.

CCR is especially important because it acts as a final control point for regulation of metabolic flux toward the monolignols and therefore toward lignin as well; prior to this reduction step, the cinnamoyl-CoA's can still enter into other expansive specialized metabolic pathways. For example, feruloyl-CoA is a precursor of the coumarin scopoletin, a compound believed to play an important role in plant pathogen response. CCR also plays a role in determining lignin composition by regulating levels of the different monomers according to its specific activity toward particular cinnamoyl-CoA's. Monocots and dicots, for example, tend to have very different lignin patterns: lignin found in monocots typically has a higher percentage of p-coumaroyl alcohol-derived subunits, while lignin found in dicots is typically composed of almost entirely coniferyl alcohol and sinapyl alcohol subunits. As can be seen in the diagram shown to the right, these monolignols are derived directly from their corresponding aldehydes, except in the case of sinapyl alcohol - while several CCR homologs have been shown to act on sinapoyl-CoA in vitro, it is unclear whether this activity is biologically relevant and most current models of the lignin pathway do not include this reaction as a valid step.

Recent studies indicate that many plant species have two distinct homologs of CCR with differential activity in planta. In some plants the two homologs vary primarily by substrate specificity. For example, CCR1 of the model legume Medicago truncatula shows strong preference toward feruloyl-CoA (typical of most CCRs), while the plant's CCR2 exhibits a clear preference for both p-coumaroyl- and caffeoyl-CoA. This second CCR, which is allosterically activated by its preferred substrates but inhibited by feruloyl-CoA, is thought to act as part of a shunt pathway toward coniferaldehyde that enhances the pathway's overall flexibility and robustness in different conditions. In other cases though, the two homologs vary primarily by expression pattern. In the model plant Arabidopsis thaliana, for instance, the CCR1 and CCR2 homologs both display higher activity toward feruloyl-CoA than other substrates, but CCR2 is only expressed transiently during bacterial infection. The homolog pair in switchgrass (Panicum virgatum) differs in both ways: CCR2 prefers p-coumaroyl- and caffeoyl-CoA and is only expressed under specifically induced conditions, while CCR1 prefers feruloyl-CoA and is expressed constitutively in lignifying tissue.

Regulation of CCR expression is thought to occur primarily at the transcriptional level. In Arabidopsis thaliana, several of the required transcription factors for CCR expression have actually been identified, including MYB58 and MYB63, both of which are implicated generally in secondary cell wall formation. It has been shown that over-expression of these two transcription factors results in a 2- to 3-fold increase in CCR mRNA transcripts, though intriguingly, the up-regulation of genes further upstream in the monolignol pathway is even greater. Non-transcriptional regulation of CCR, however, can be important as well. In rice (Oryza sativa), for example, evidence suggests that the CCR1 homolog is an effector of Rac1, a small GTPase important for plant defense response. In this case, the Rac1 protein is proposed to activate CCR upon binding, leading to enhanced monolignol biosynthesis. Because Rac1 also activates NADPH oxidase, which produces peroxides critical for monolignol polymerization, overall lignin biosynthesis is enhanced as well.

== Biotechnological significance ==
Efforts to engineer plant cell wall formation for enhanced biofuel production commonly target lignin biosynthesis in order to reduce lignin content and thereby improve yields of ethanol from cellulose, a complex polysaccharide important for cell wall structure. Lignin is troublesome for biofuel production because it is the main contributor to plant biomass recalcitrance due to its toughness and heterogeneity. By reducing lignin content, the cellulose is more easily accessible to the chemical and biological reagents used to break it down. Lowering the expression level of CCR in particular has emerged as a common strategy for accomplishing this goal, and this strategy has resulted in successful lignin content reduction and increased ethanol production from several plant species including tobacco (Nicotiana tabacum) and poplar (Populus tremula x Populus alba). Challenges with this strategy include the wide variation in expression levels associated with current plant genetic transformation technologies in addition to the dramatic decrease in overall growth and biomass that typically accompanies low lignin production. However, it has been shown that by targeting CCR down-regulation to specific tissue types or coupling it to down-regulation of cinnamyl alcohol dehydrogenase (CAD), the latter challenge at least can be somewhat mitigated.
