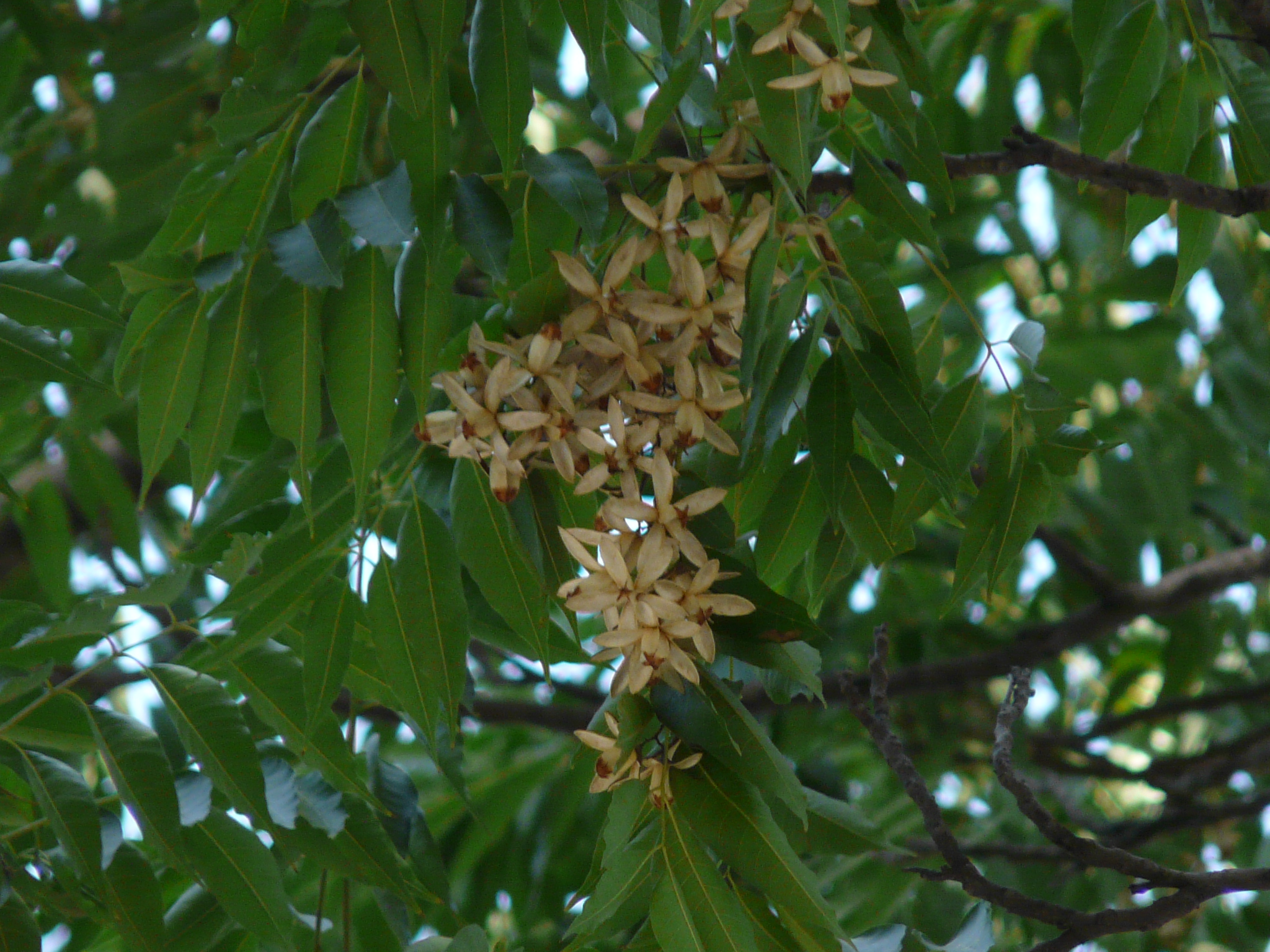

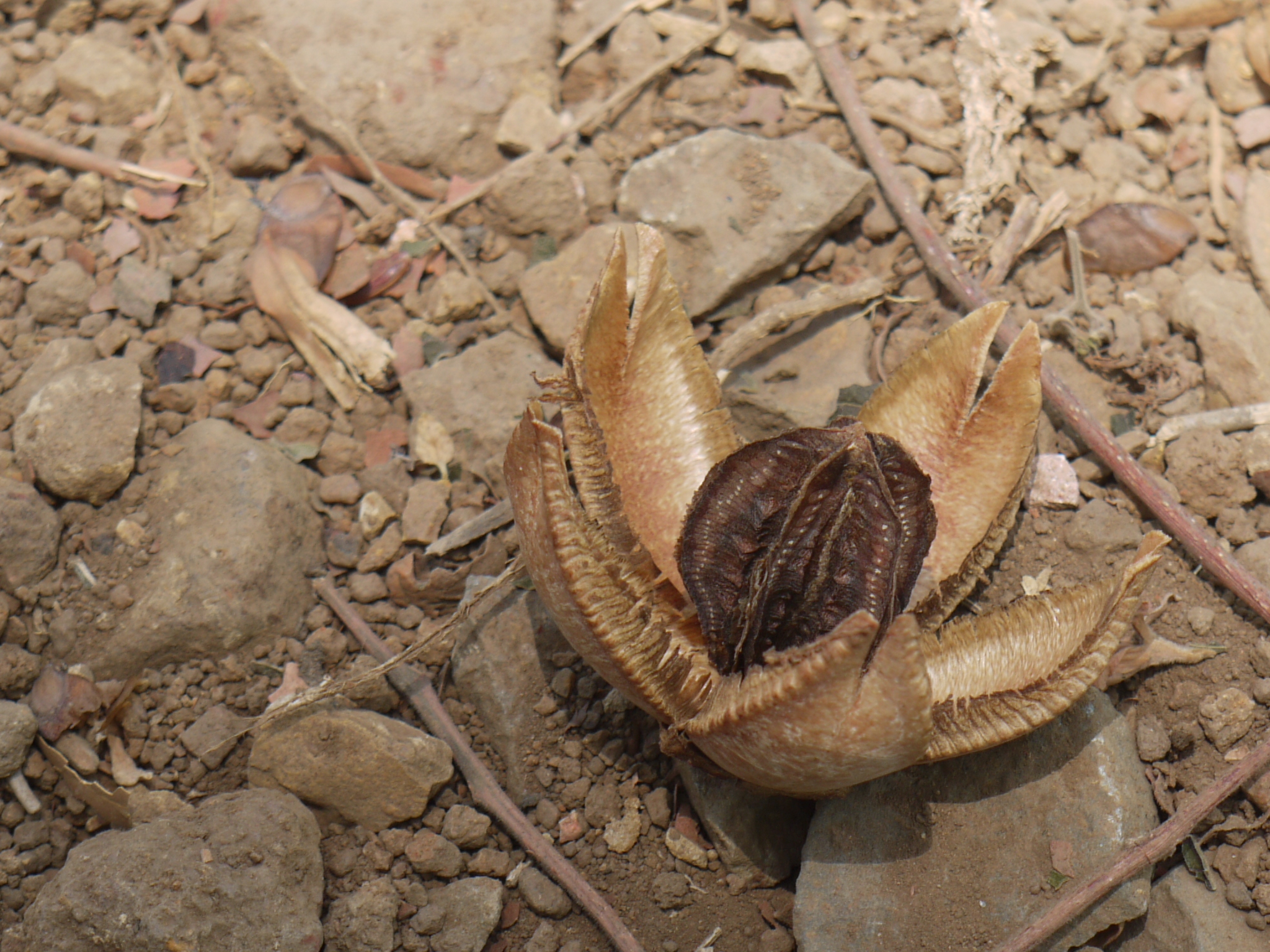
- C. tabularis flowers, leaves and capsule

Conservation status
- Least Concern (IUCN 3.1)

Scientific classification
- Kingdom: Plantae
- Clade: Embryophytes
- Clade: Tracheophytes
- Clade: Spermatophytes
- Clade: Angiosperms
- Clade: Eudicots
- Clade: Rosids
- Order: Sapindales
- Family: Meliaceae
- Subfamily: Cedreloideae
- Genus: Chukrasia; A.Juss.
- Species: C. tabularis

Binomial name
- Chukrasia tabularis A.Juss.

Synonyms
- Chickrassia nimmonii J. Graham ex Wight; Chickrassia tabularis Wight & Arn.; Chickrassia tabularis var. velutina (M. Roem.) King; Chickrassia velutina M. Roem.; Chukrasia chickrassa (Roxb.) J.Schultze-Motel; Chukrasia nimmonii Graham ex Wight; Chukrasia tabularis var. dongnaiensis (Pierre) Pellegr.; Chukrasia tabularis var. macrocarpa (Pierre) Pellegr.; Chukrasia tabularis var. microcarpa (Pierre) Pellegr.; Chukrasia tabularis var. velutina (M. Roem.) Pellegr.; Chukrasia trilocularis (G.Don) M.Roem.; Chukrasia velutina M.Roem.; Chukrasia velutina (M. Roem.) C. DC.; Chukrasia velutina var. dongnaiensis Pierre; Chukrasia velutina var. macrocarpa Pierre; Chukrasia velutina var. microcarpa Pierre; Dysoxylum esquirolii H.Lév.; Melia tomentosa Kurz; Plagiotaxis chickrassa Wall.; Plagiotaxis velutina Wall.; Surenus velutina Kuntze; Swietenia trilocularis Roxb. ex G.Don; Swietenia velutina (M.Roem.) Wall. ex Kurz; Swietenia villosa Wall. ex Kurz; Toona velutina M.Roem.; Toona villosa M.Roem.; Sapindus multijugus Wall. ex Hiern

= Chukrasia =

Indian mahogany

Genus of trees

Chukrasia tabularis, the Indian mahogany, is a deciduous, tropical forest tree species in the Mahogany Family (Meliaceae). It is native to the Andaman Islands, Bangladesh, Cambodia, China, India, Indonesia, Laos, Malaysia, Myanmar, Sri Lanka, Thailand, and Vietnam. Also introduced to many western countries such as Cameroon, Costa Rica, Nigeria, Puerto Rico, South Africa, and United States.

The genus Chukrasia is monotypic, with previously recognised species now considered to be synonyms. "C. velutina" (this species) is listed as the provincial flower and tree of Phrae Province, Thailand and is widely used in Ayurveda as an important medicinal plant.

== Description ==
The trees are tall with a cylindrical bole and spreading crown. C. tabularis leaves are abruptly pinnate or bipinnate with leaflets that alternate or are subopposite, entire and unequal at the base. The erect, oblong flowers, which are rather large and born in terminal panicles, possess four to five petals. Mature fruits are a septifragally three to five valved capsule. This is one of the largest trees of South Asia and the East Indies One specimen near Kanchanaburi, Thailand measures 21 m (69 ft) girth and is 65 m (213 ft) height.

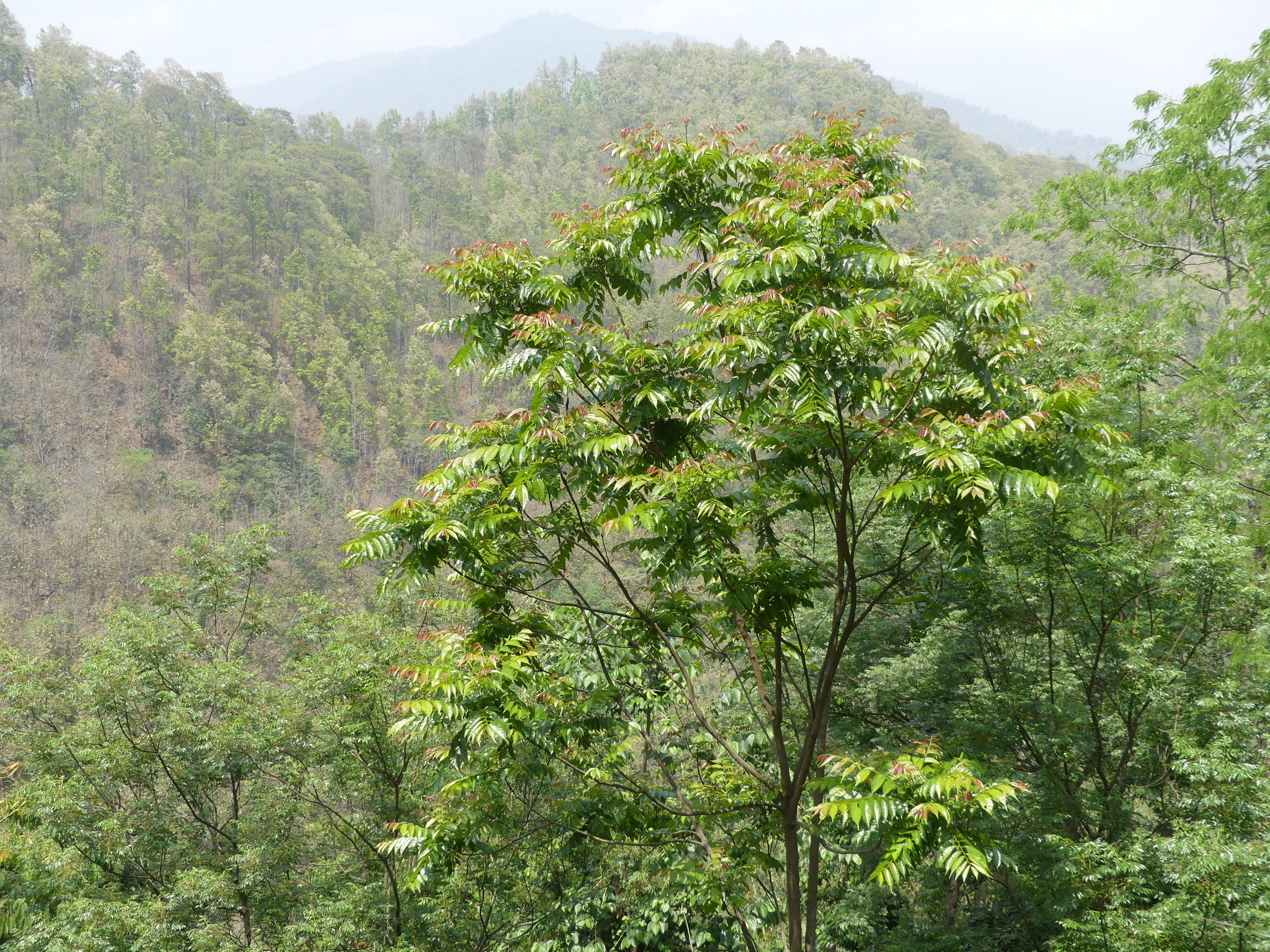

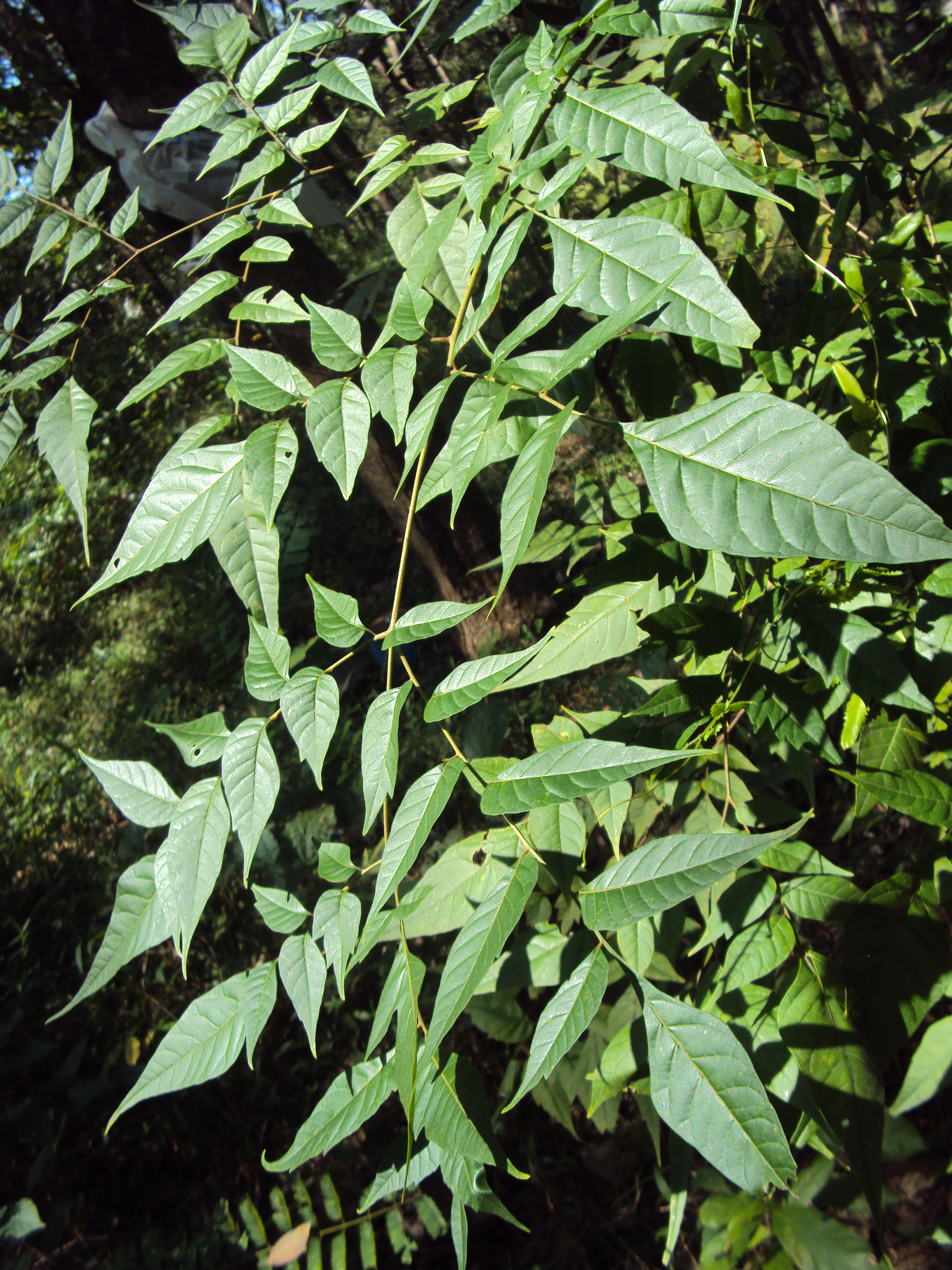

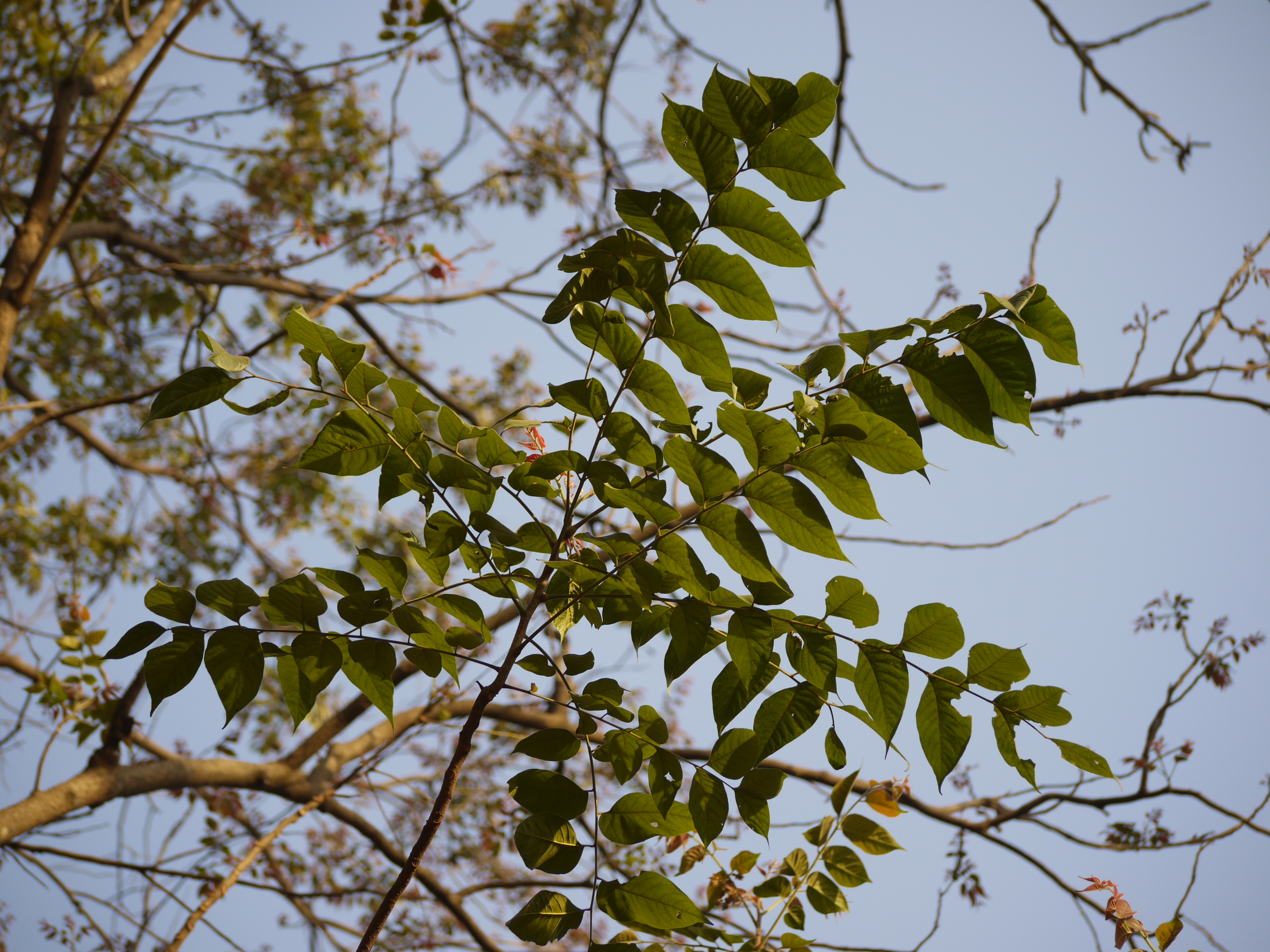

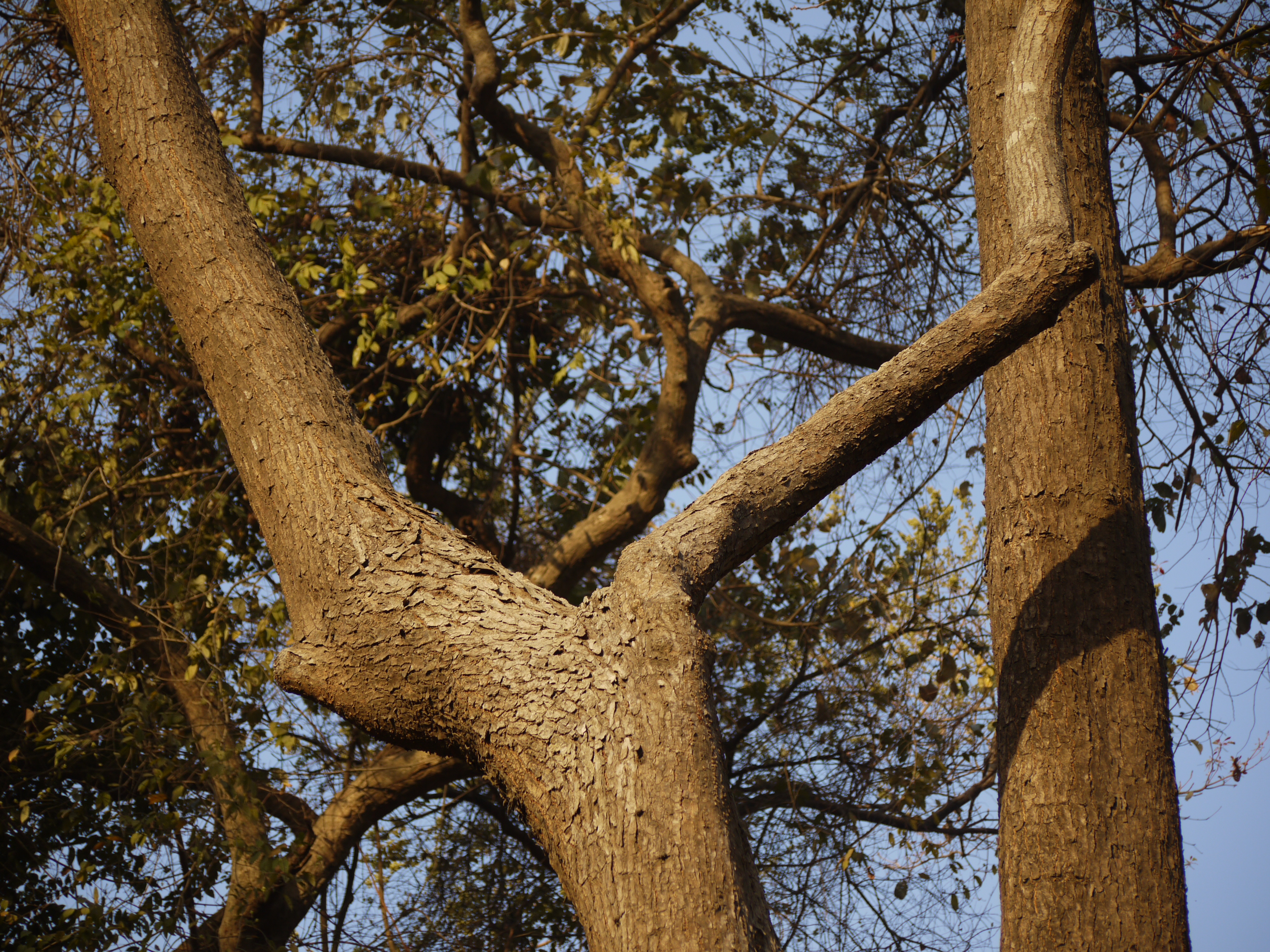

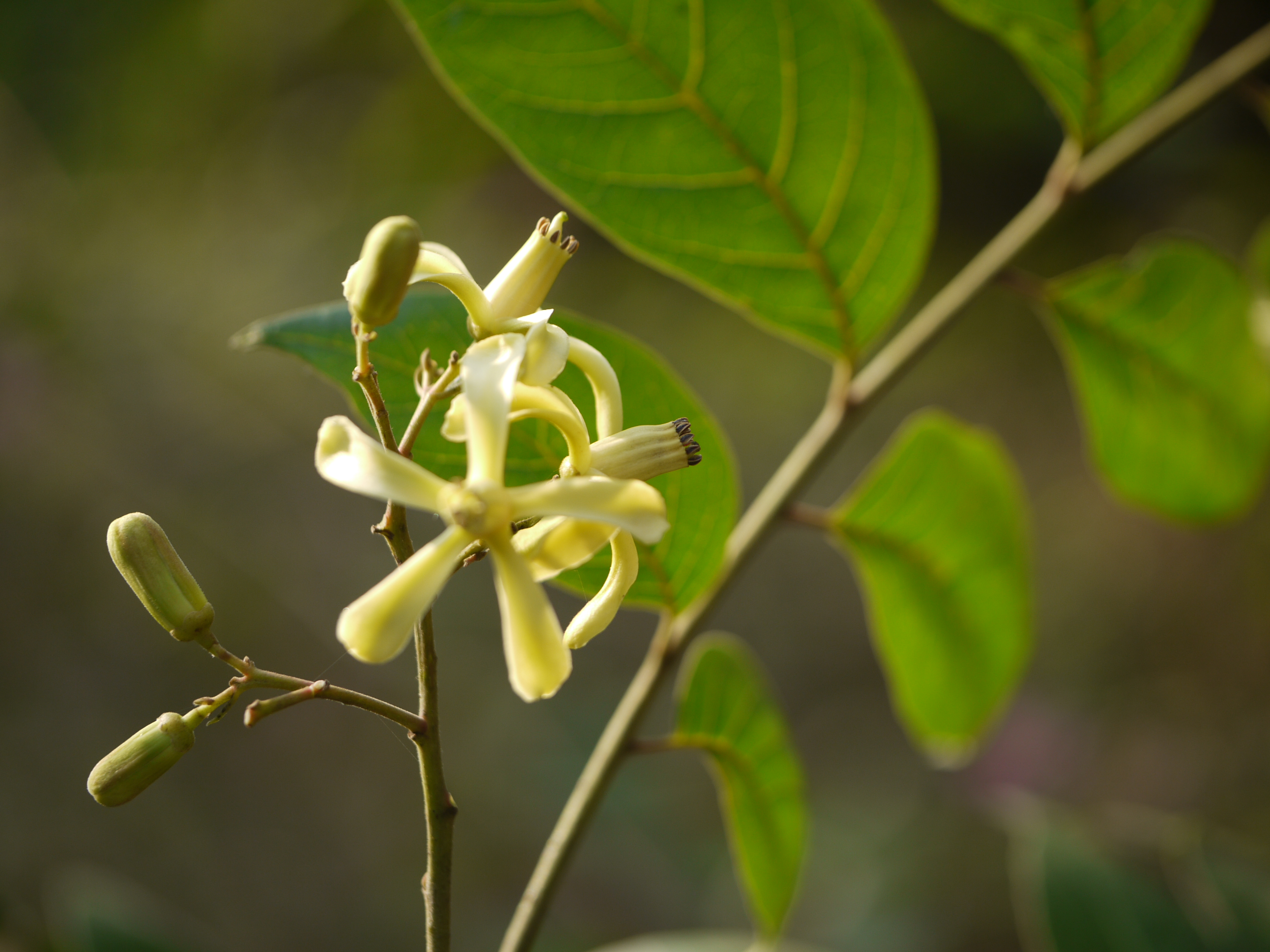

== Chemical constituents ==
Leaves of C. tabularis contain quercetin and its 3-galactoside, galloyl glucoside, tannic acid and a flavone. The bark contains sitosterol, melianone, scopoletin, 6,7-dimethoxycoumarin, tetranorterpenes and tabularin. The wood contains bussein homologue and chukrasins A, B, C, D and F. The root contains a triterpene, cedrelone. Seeds contain tetranorterpenes, phragmalin esters and 12 α-OAc-phyramalin. Four new meliacin esters 3,30-diisobutyrates and 3-isobutyrate-30-propionates of phragmalin and 12-acetoxyphragmalin have also been isolated from seeds.

== Common names ==
- English - Bastard cedar, White cedar, East-Indian mahogany, Indian redwood, Burma almond wood, Chickrassy, Chittagong wood
- Hindi - Chikrasi (चिकरासी)
- Manipuri - Taimareng (তাঈমৰেঙ)
- Telugu - Kondavepa
- Tamil - Malei veppu (மலை வேப்பு)
- Kannada - Kalgarike
- Malayalam - Suvannakil
- Myanmar - Yinmarbin (ယင်းမာပင်) (ယင္းမာ)
- Bengali - Chikrassi
- Assamese - Boga-poma/বগী পমা
- Sinhala - Hulan hik (හුලං හික් ) / Hirikita (හිරිකිත)
- Vietnamese - Lát hoa

- Mizo - Zawngtei
