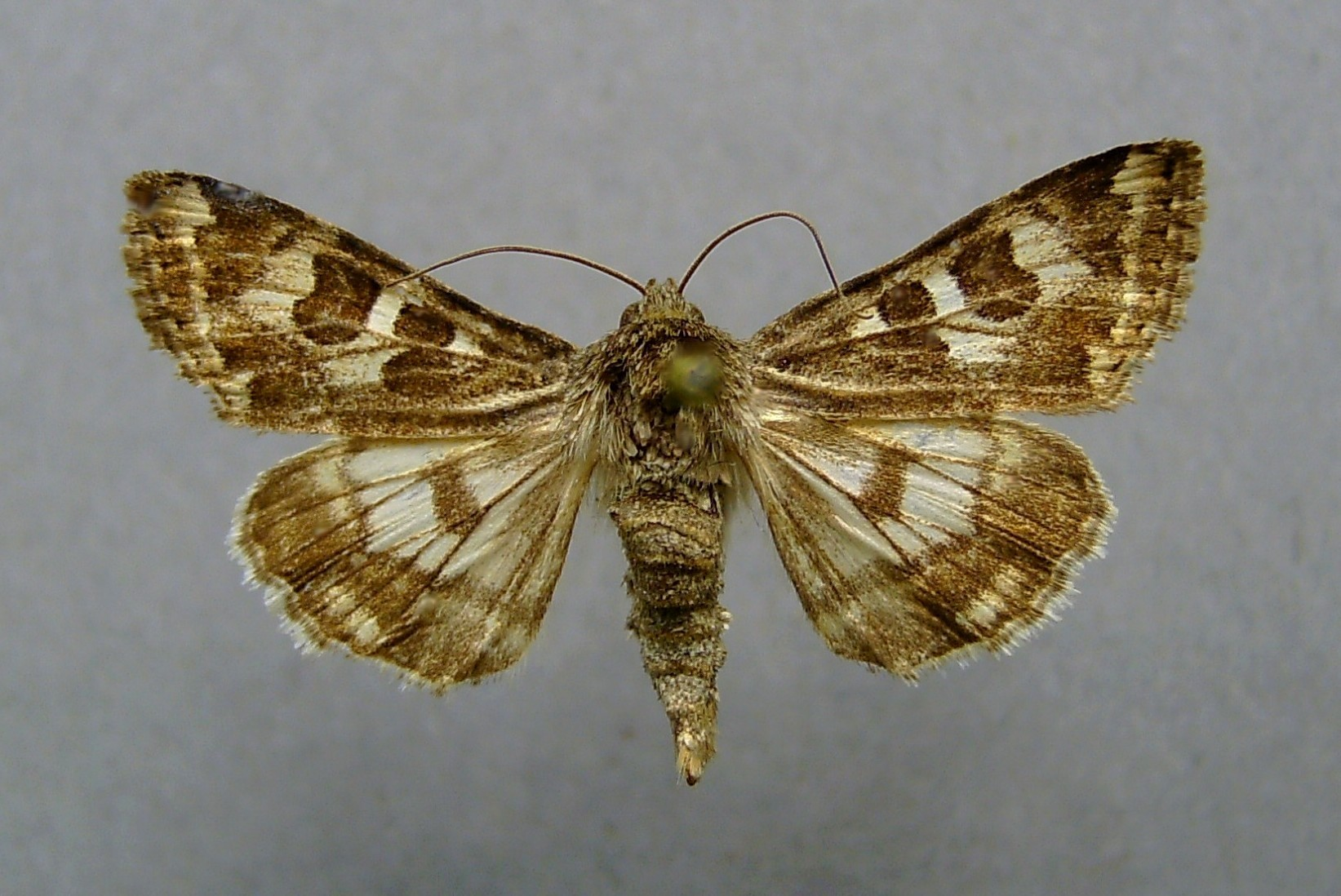

Scientific classification
- Domain: Eukaryota
- Kingdom: Animalia
- Phylum: Arthropoda
- Class: Insecta
- Order: Lepidoptera
- Superfamily: Noctuoidea
- Family: Noctuidae
- Genus: Schinia
- Species: S. scutosa

Binomial name
- Schinia scutosa (Denis & Schiffermüller, 1775)

Synonyms
- Noctua scutosa Denis & Schiffermuller, 1775; Protoschinia scutosa

= Schinia scutosa =

Spotted clover

Species of moth

Schinia scutosa, the spotted clover, is a moth of the family Noctuidae. It is found from Europe to southern Siberia, the Near East and the Middle East and from central Asia to Japan. In North Africa it is found from Morocco to Egypt.

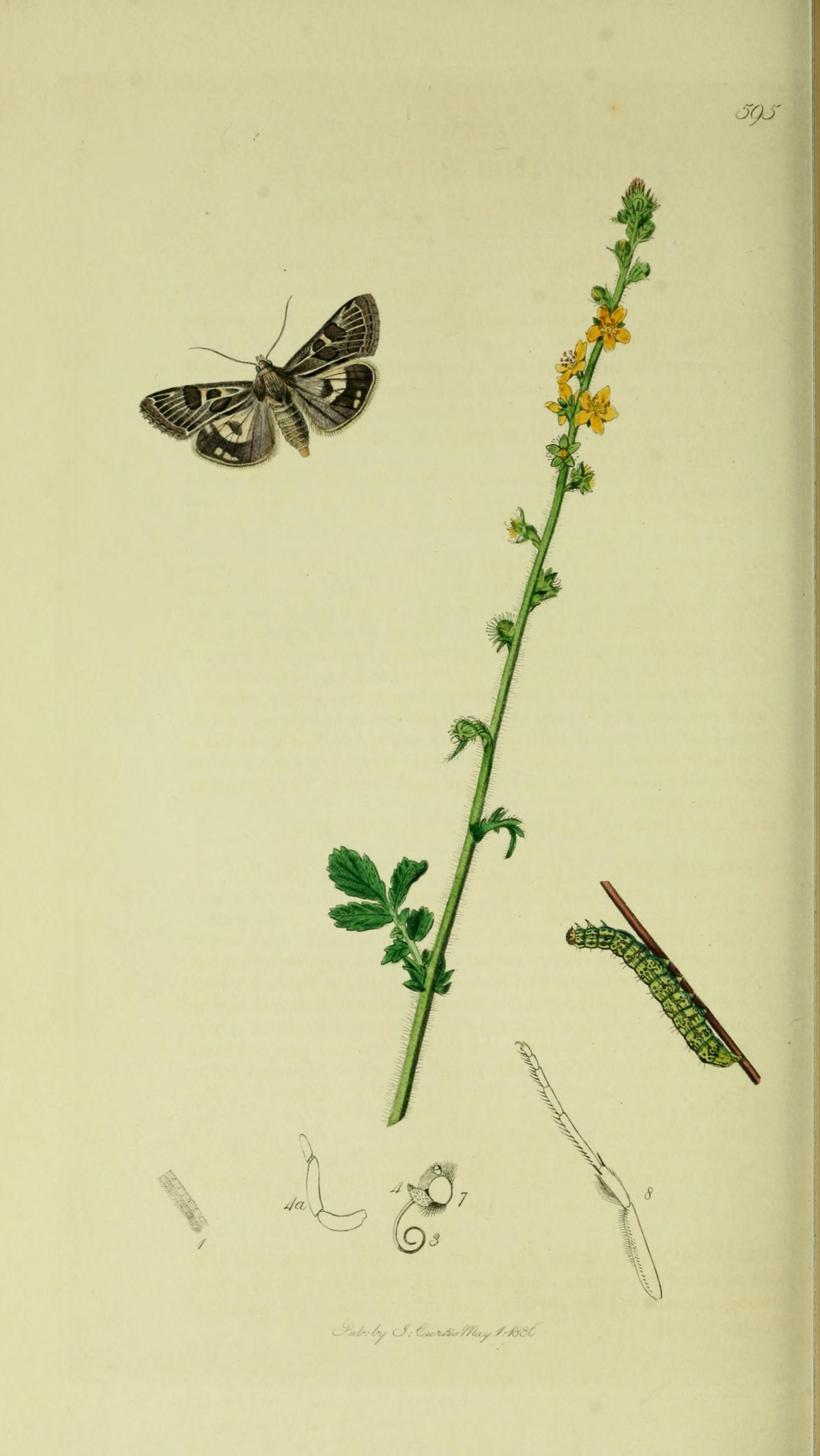
Illustration from John Curtis's British Entomology Volume 5

== Technical description and variation ==
The wingspan is 30–36 mm. Forewing dull whitish, the marginal areas speckled olive-brown; stigmata all large and conspicuous, brown with black outlines; a brown band between the dark outer and white subterminal lines; hindwing white, the veins brown; a broad dark marginal border, with two pale spots between 2 and 4, preceded by a sinuous outer line; a large black discoidal lunule.

== Biology ==
Adults are on wing from July to September. There are two generations per year in southern Europe.

Larva dark green, the sides and venter yellow; lines yellow, the subdorsal freckled with black; head yellow with black spots. The larvae feed on Artemisia species, including Artemisia vulgaris, Artemisia campestris, Artemisia scoparia, Artemisia abrotanum and Artemisia dracunculus.

== Taxonomy ==
Schinia scutosa was placed as a synonym of North American species Schinia nuchalis, but was treated as a separate species by Hardwick in 1996. Many authors place Schinia scutosa in the genus Protoschinia.
