= Isoliquiritigenin =

Names
- Preferred IUPAC name 2′,4,4′-Trihydroxychalcone
- Other names: 6'-Deoxychalcone; 4,2',4'-Trihydroxychalcone; 2',4,4'-Trihydroxychalcone

Identifiers
CAS Number	961-29-5
3D model (JSmol)	Interactive image
Abbreviations	ILTG
ChEBI	CHEBI:310312
ChEMBL	ChEMBL129795
ChemSpider	553829
ECHA InfoCard	100.202.617
EC Number	237-316-5
KEGG	C08650
PubChem CID	638278
UNII	B9CTI9GB8F
CompTox Dashboard (EPA)	DTXSID2022466
- InChI: InChI=1S/C15H12O4/c16-11-4-1-10(2-5-11)3-8-14(18)13-7-6-12(17)9-15(13)19/h1-9,16-17,19H/b8-3+ Key: DXDRHHKMWQZJHT-FPYGCLRLSA-N
- SMILES: C1=CC(=CC=C1C=CC(=O)C2=C(C=C(C=C2)O)O)O

Properties
Chemical formula	C_{15}H_{12}O_{4}
Molar mass	256.257 g·mol^{−1}
- Except where otherwise noted, data are given for materials in their standard state (at 25 °C [77 °F], 100 kPa). Infobox references

Isoliquiritigenin is a chalcone found in the roots of several Glycyrrhiza species, such as liquorice, studied for its activity as a tyrosinase inhibitor, NMDA receptor antagonist, GABA modulator, and its potential antineoplastic and geroprotective effects.

== Occurrence ==
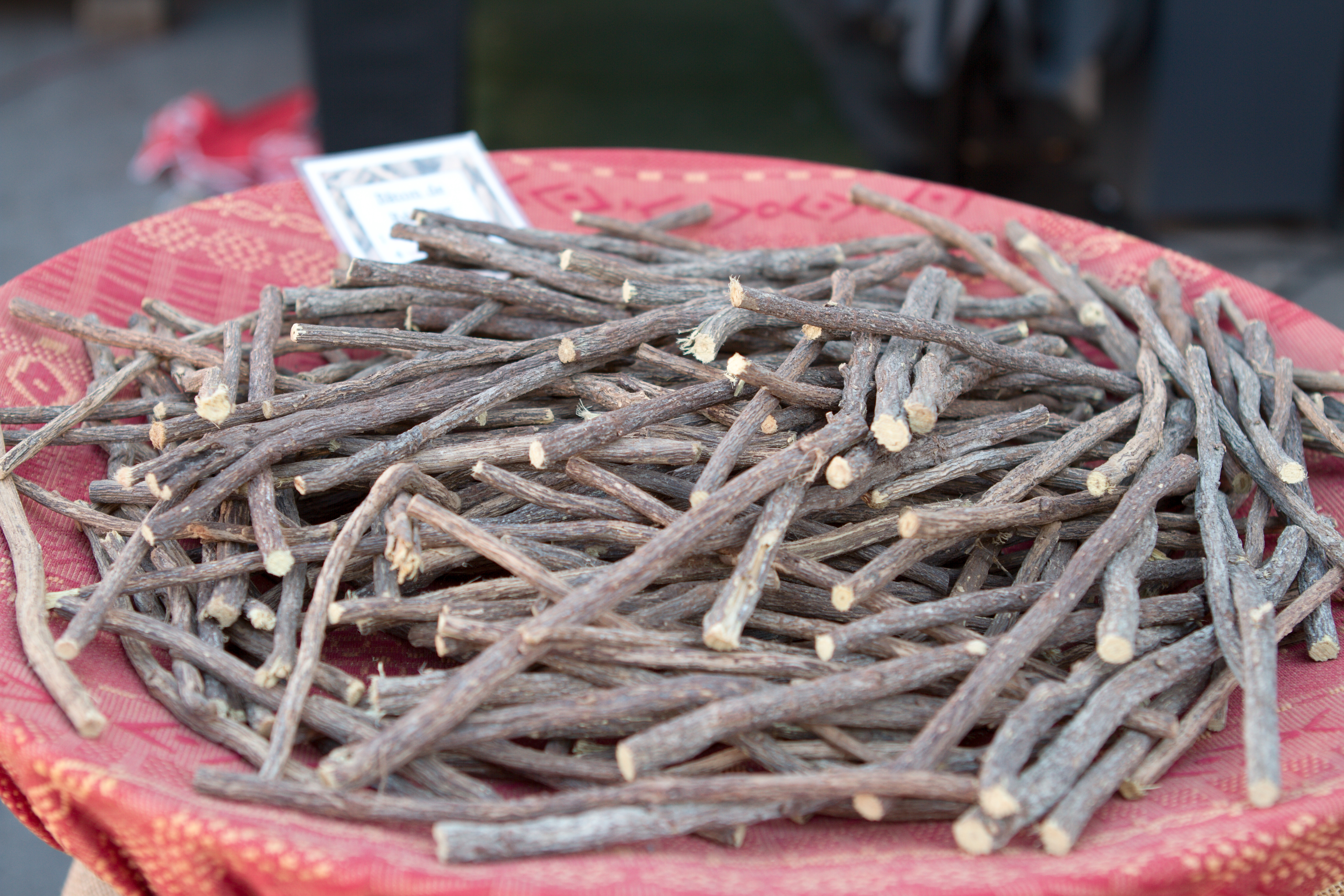
Liquorice roots

Isoliquiritigenin occurs in some species of the genus Glycyrrhiza, including Glycyrrhiza glabra (licorice).

== Pharmacological properties ==
Isoliquiritigenin has been studied for its potential pharmacological properties, and ongoing research is exploring its use in food additives and therapeutic applications, although further studies are needed to evaluate its safety and potential target-organ toxicity. It is also under preliminary research for potential anti-inflammatory effects through multiple molecular pathways. It has been studied for its effects on melanoma cells, where it was found to modulate microRNA-301b and its target gene LRIG1 in experimental models. It is under preliminary research for potential therapeutic effects against age-related neurodegenerative diseases by targeting multiple pathological mechanisms such as oxidative stress, neurotransmitter imbalance, and mitochondrial dysfunction.

=== Pharmakokinetics ===
Isoliquiritigenin exhibits various biological activities but has low oral bioavailability (11.8%) in rats due to extensive metabolism in the liver and small intestine, resulting in high levels of its metabolites M1 and M2.

=== Mechanism of action ===
Isoliquiritigenin has been found to be a potent (65 times higher affinity than diazepam) GABA-A benzodiazepine receptor positive allosteric modulator with hypnotic effects in mice. It competitively inhibits human monoamine oxidase enzymes and interacts with dopamine and vasopressin receptors.

== Biosynthesis ==
In Glycyrrhiza echinata, the enzyme 6'-deoxychalcone synthase catalyzes the synthesis of isoliquiritigenin from one unit of coumaroyl-CoA and three of malonyl-CoA. It requires reduced nicotinamide adenine dinucleotide phosphate (NADPH) to activate the substrate.

coumaroyl-CoA
+ NADPH + 3
malonyl-CoA
H^{+}
3 CO_{2}
isoliquiritigenin
NADP^{+} +
4 coenzyme A
