= Cinnamate hydroxylase =

Cinnamate hydroxylase may refer to:

- Trans-cinnamate 2-monooxygenase
- Trans-cinnamate 4-monooxygenase
