= Cinnamoyl-CoA =

Cinnamoyl-Coenzyme A

Names
- IUPAC name 3′-O-Phosphonoadenosine 5′-[(3R)-3-hydroxy-2,2-dimethyl-4-({3-[(2-{[(2E)-3-phenylprop-2-enoyl]sulfanyl}ethyl)amino]-3-oxopropyl}amino)-4-oxobutyl dihydroxen diphosphate]
- Systematic IUPAC name [(2R,3S,4R,5R)-5-(6-Amino-9H-purin-9-yl)-4-hydroxy-3-(phosphonooxy)oxolan-2-yl]methyl (3R)-3-hydroxy-2,2-dimethyl-4-({3-[(2-{[(2E)-3-phenylprop-2-enoyl]sulfanyl}ethyl)amino]-3-oxopropyl}amino)-4-oxobutyl dihydrogen diphosphate
- Other names Cinnamoyl-coa (E)-cinnamoyl-CoA; Coenzyme A, S-(3-phenyl-2-propenoate) (E)-benzylideneacetyl-CoA; 3-phenylacryloyl-CoA

Identifiers
CAS Number	76109-04-1; 30801-99-1 (non-specific)
3D model (JSmol)	Interactive image
ChemSpider	4947984
PubChem CID	6444037
UNII	6YVQ9P5RAT
CompTox Dashboard (EPA)	DTXSID501030398
- InChI: InChI=1S/C30H42N7O17P3S/c1-30(2,25(41)28(42)33-11-10-20(38)32-12-13-58-21(39)9-8-18-6-4-3-5-7-18)15-51-57(48,49)54-56(46,47)50-14-19-24(53-55(43,44)45)23(40)29(52-19)37-17-36-22-26(31)34-16-35-27(22)37/h3-9,16-17,19,23-25,29,40-41H,10-15H2,1-2H3,(H,32,38)(H,33,42)(H,46,47)(H,48,49)(H2,31,34,35)(H2,43,44,45)/b9-8+/t19-,23-,24-,25+,29-/m1/s1 Key: JVNVHNHITFVWIX-KZKUDURGSA-N; InChI=1/C30H42N7O17P3S/c1-30(2,25(41)28(42)33-11-10-20(38)32-12-13-58-21(39)9-8-18-6-4-3-5-7-18)15-51-57(48,49)54-56(46,47)50-14-19-24(53-55(43,44)45)23(40)29(52-19)37-17-36-22-26(31)34-16-35-27(22)37/h3-9,16-17,19,23-25,29,40-41H,10-15H2,1-2H3,(H,32,38)(H,33,42)(H,46,47)(H,48,49)(H2,31,34,35)(H2,43,44,45)/b9-8+/t19-,23-,24-,25+,29-/m1/s1 Key: JVNVHNHITFVWIX-KZKUDURGBU
- SMILES: CC(C)(COP(=O)(O)OP(=O)(O)OC[C@@H]1[C@H]([C@H]([C@@H](O1)N2C=NC3=C(N=CN=C32)N)O)OP(=O)(O)O)[C@H](C(=O)NCCC(=O)NCCSC(=O)/C=C/C4=CC=CC=C4)O

Properties
Chemical formula	C_{30}H_{42}N_{7}O_{17}P_{3}S
Molar mass	897.68 g·mol^{−1}
- Except where otherwise noted, data are given for materials in their standard state (at 25 °C [77 °F], 100 kPa). Infobox references

Cinnamoyl-coenzyme A is an intermediate in the phenylpropanoid metabolic pathway. It is the thioester formed between cinnamic acid and coenzyme A.

== Biosynthesis ==
Cinnamoyl-CoA is produced in two enzymatically-catalysed steps of the phenylpropanoid metabolic pathway. In the first, phenylalanine ammonia-lyase (PAL), converts the amino acid phenylalanine to cinnamic acid:

phenylalanine
PAL
NH_{3}
cinnamic acid

Subsequently, 4-coumarate-CoA ligase produces the thioester with coenzyme A. The reaction is driven to completion by the energy produced by the hydrolysis of adenosine triphosphate (ATP) to its monophosphate AMP, releasing diphosphate.

cinnamic acid + coenzyme A
ligase
ATP
AMP
cinnamoyl-CoA

== Enzymes using cinnamoyl-coenzyme A ==
Cinnamoyl-CoA reductase catalyzes the chemical reaction which produces cinnamaldehyde from cinnamoyl-CoA:

cinnamoyl-CoA
+ NADPH
H^{+}
cinnamaldehyde
+ coenzyme A + NADP^{+}

The reaction is important in the production of monolignols, which are the building blocks for plant lignin.

Pinosylvin synthase combines one unit of cinnamoyl-CoA with three of malonyl-CoA to form the stilbene, pinosylvin, with coenzyme A and carbon dioxide as byproducts. The product is produced in response to fungal attack on the pine tree Pinus sylvestris.

cinnamoyl-CoA + 3
malonyl-CoA
4 CO_{2}
pinosylvin
+ 4 coenzyme A

Cinnamoyl-CoA:phenyllactate CoA-transferase catalyzes a chemical reaction which transfers the coenzyme A thioester from cinnamoyl-CoA to (R)-phenyllactic acid, giving (R)-phenyllactyl-CoA and cinnamic acid.
