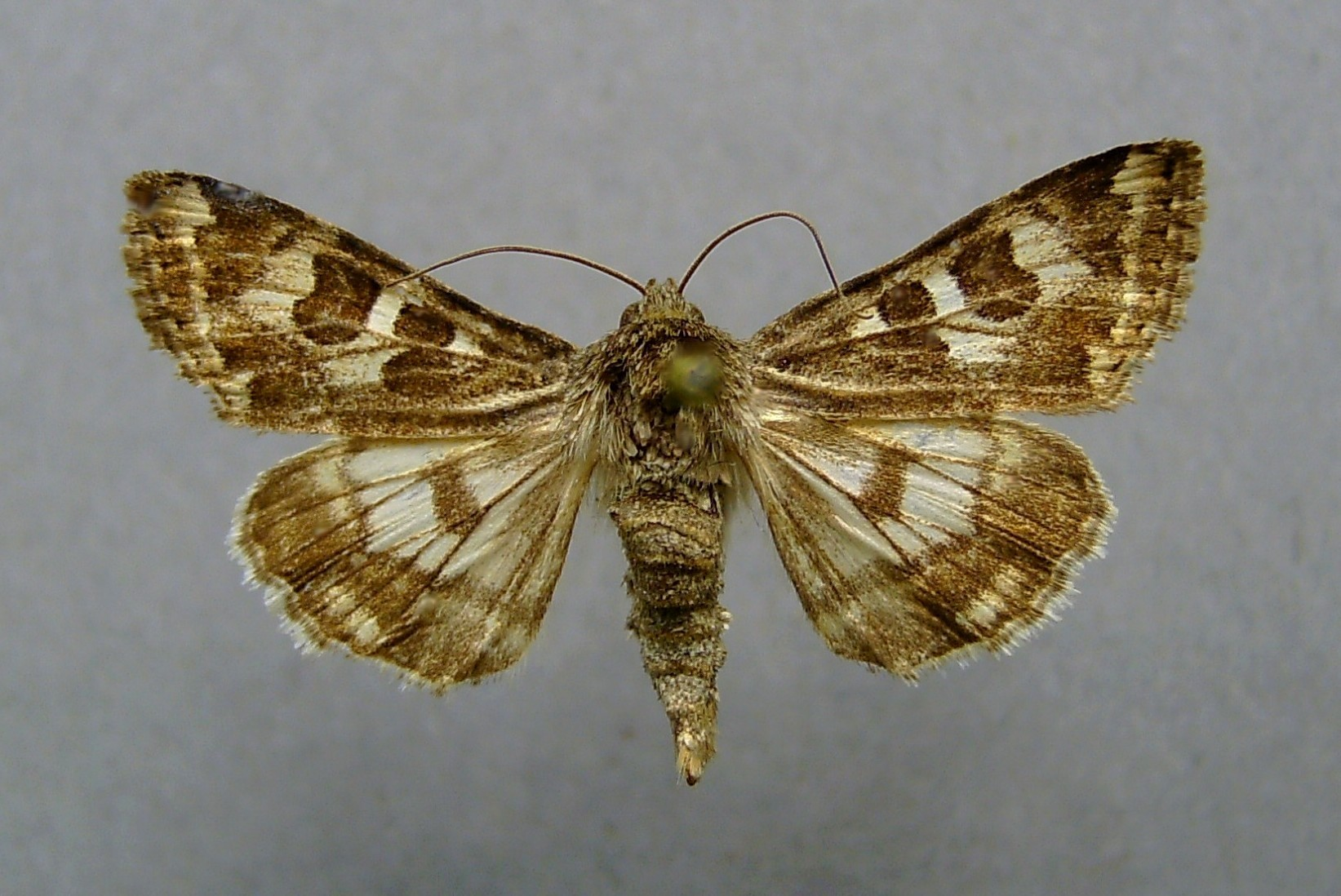
- Protoschinia scutosa

Scientific classification
- Domain: Eukaryota
- Kingdom: Animalia
- Phylum: Arthropoda
- Class: Insecta
- Order: Lepidoptera
- Superfamily: Noctuoidea
- Family: Noctuidae
- Subfamily: Heliothinae
- Genus: Protoschinia; Hardwick, 1970

= Protoschinia =

Genus of moths

Protoschinia was a genus of moths of the family Noctuidae.

Protoschinia scutosa, the only species in the genus was considered a synonym of Schinia nuchalis, but is now treated as a valid species. The genus was revalidated by Beck in 1996, but it is unclear if this is widely accepted since many authors still classify scutosa in the genus Schinia.
