= 2-coumarate O-beta-glucosyltransferase =

Class of enzymes

Identifiers
- EC no.: 2.4.1.114
- CAS no.: 73665-97-1

Databases
- IntEnz: IntEnz view
- BRENDA: BRENDA entry
- ExPASy: NiceZyme view
- KEGG: KEGG entry
- MetaCyc: metabolic pathway
- PRIAM: profile
- PDB structures: RCSB PDB PDBe PDBsum
- Gene Ontology: AmiGO / QuickGO
Search
- PMC: articles
- PubMed: articles
- NCBI: proteins

2-coumarate O-beta-glucosyltransferase (EC 2.4.1.114) is an enzyme that catalyzes the chemical reaction

o-coumaric acid
+ UDP-glucose
UDP
melilotoside

The two substrates of this enzyme characterised from Melilotus alba are o-coumaric acid and UDP-glucose. Its products are melilotoside and uridine diphosphate (UDP).

This enzyme belongs to the family of glycosyltransferases, specifically the hexosyltransferases. The systematic name of this enzyme class is UDP-glucose:trans-2-hydroxycinnamate O-beta-D-glucosyltransferase. Other names in common use include uridine diphosphoglucose-o-coumarate glucosyltransferase, and UDPG:o-coumaric acid O-glucosyltransferase. This enzyme participates in phenylpropanoid biosynthesis.
