= Anthocyanin 5-aromatic acyltransferase =

Class of enzymes

anthocyanin 5-aromatic acyltransferase

Identifiers
- EC no.: 2.3.1.153
- CAS no.: 179466-49-0

Databases
- IntEnz: IntEnz view
- BRENDA: BRENDA entry
- ExPASy: NiceZyme view
- KEGG: KEGG entry
- MetaCyc: metabolic pathway
- PRIAM: profile
- PDB structures: RCSB PDB PDBe PDBsum
- Gene Ontology: AmiGO / QuickGO
Search
- PMC: articles
- PubMed: articles
- NCBI: proteins

In enzymology, an anthocyanin 5-aromatic acyltransferase (EC 2.3.1.153) is an enzyme that catalyzes the chemical reaction

hydroxycinnamoyl-CoA + anthocyanidin-3,5-diglucoside $\rightleftharpoons$ CoA + anthocyanidin 3-glucoside-5-hydroxycinnamoylglucoside

Thus, the two substrates of this enzyme are hydroxycinnamoyl-CoA and anthocyanidin-3,5-diglucoside, whereas its two products are CoA and anthocyanidin 3-glucoside-5-hydroxycinnamoylglucoside.

This enzyme belongs to the family of transferases, specifically those acyltransferases transferring groups other than aminoacyl groups. The systematic name of this enzyme class is hydroxycinnamoyl-CoA:anthocyanidin 3,5-diglucoside 5-O-glucoside-6"'-O-hydroxycinnamoyltransferase.
