= Flavonol-3-O-triglucoside O-coumaroyltransferase =

Identifiers
- EC no.: 2.3.1.173

Databases
- IntEnz: IntEnz view
- BRENDA: BRENDA entry
- ExPASy: NiceZyme view
- KEGG: KEGG entry
- MetaCyc: metabolic pathway
- PRIAM: profile
- PDB structures: RCSB PDB PDBe PDBsum
Search
- PMC: articles
- PubMed: articles
- NCBI: proteins

In enzymology, a flavonol-3-O-triglucoside O-coumaroyltransferase (EC 2.3.1.173) is an enzyme that catalyzes the chemical reaction

4-coumaroyl-CoA + a flavonol 3-O-[beta-D-glucosyl-(1->2)-beta-D-glucosyl-(1->2)-beta-D-glucoside] $\rightleftharpoons$ CoA + a flavonol 3-O-[6-(4-coumaroyl)-beta-D-glucosyl-(1->2)-beta-D-glucosyl-(1->2)- beta-D-glucoside]

The 3 substrates of this enzyme are 4-coumaroyl-CoA, flavonol, and [[3-O-beta-D-glucosyl-(1->2)-beta-D-glucosyl-(1->2)-beta-D-glucoside]], whereas its 4 products are CoA, flavonol, [[3-O-[6-(4-coumaroyl)-beta-D-glucosyl-(1->2)-beta-D-glucosyl-(1->2)-]], and beta-D-glucoside].

This enzyme belongs to the family of transferases, to be specific those acyltransferases transferring groups other than aminoacyl groups. The systematic name of this enzyme class is 4-coumaroyl-CoA:flavonol-3-O-[beta-D-glucosyl-(1->2)-beta-D-glucosid e] 6-O-4-coumaroyltransferase.
