= Cinnamoyl-CoA:phenyllactate CoA-transferase =

Class of enzymes

cinnamoyl-CoA:phenyllactate CoA-transferase

Identifiers
- EC no.: 2.8.3.17

Databases
- BRENDA: enzyme data
- ExPASy: NiceZyme view
- KEGG: enzyme entry
- MetaCyc: metabolic pathway
- Rhea: reactions
- PDB structures: RCSB PDB PDBe PDBsum
- Gene Ontology: AmiGO / QuickGO
Search
- PMC: articles
- PubMed: articles
- NCBI: proteins

Cinnamoyl-CoA:phenyllactate CoA-transferase (EC 2.8.3.17) is an enzyme that catalyzes the chemical reaction

cinnamoyl-CoA
+
(R)-3-phenyllactic acid
cinnamic acid
+
(R)-3-phenyllactyl-CoA

The two substrates of this enzyme characterised from Clostridium sporogenes are cinnamoyl-CoA and (R)-3-phenyllactic acid. Its products are cinnamic acid and (R)-3-phenyllactyl-CoA.

This enzyme belongs to the CoA-transferase family. The systematic name of this enzyme class is (E)-cinnamoyl-CoA:(R)-phenyllactate CoA-transferase. This enzyme is also called FldA.
