= Quinate O-hydroxycinnamoyltransferase =

quinate O-hydroxycinnamoyltransferase

Identifiers
- EC no.: 2.3.1.99
- CAS no.: 60321-02-0

Databases
- IntEnz: IntEnz view
- BRENDA: BRENDA entry
- ExPASy: NiceZyme view
- KEGG: KEGG entry
- MetaCyc: metabolic pathway
- PRIAM: profile
- PDB structures: RCSB PDB PDBe PDBsum
- Gene Ontology: AmiGO / QuickGO
Search
- PMC: articles
- PubMed: articles
- NCBI: proteins

In enzymology, a quinate O-hydroxycinnamoyltransferase (EC 2.3.1.99) is an enzyme that catalyzes the chemical reaction

feruloyl-CoA + quinate $\rightleftharpoons$ CoA + O-feruloylquinate

Thus, the two substrates of this enzyme are feruloyl-CoA and quinate, whereas its two products are CoA and O-feruloylquinate.

This enzyme belongs to the family of transferases, specifically those acyltransferases transferring groups other than aminoacyl groups. The systematic name of this enzyme class is feruloyl-CoA:quinate O-(hydroxycinnamoyl)transferase. This enzyme is also called hydroxycinnamoyl coenzyme A-quinate transferase. This enzyme participates in phenylpropanoid biosynthesis.
