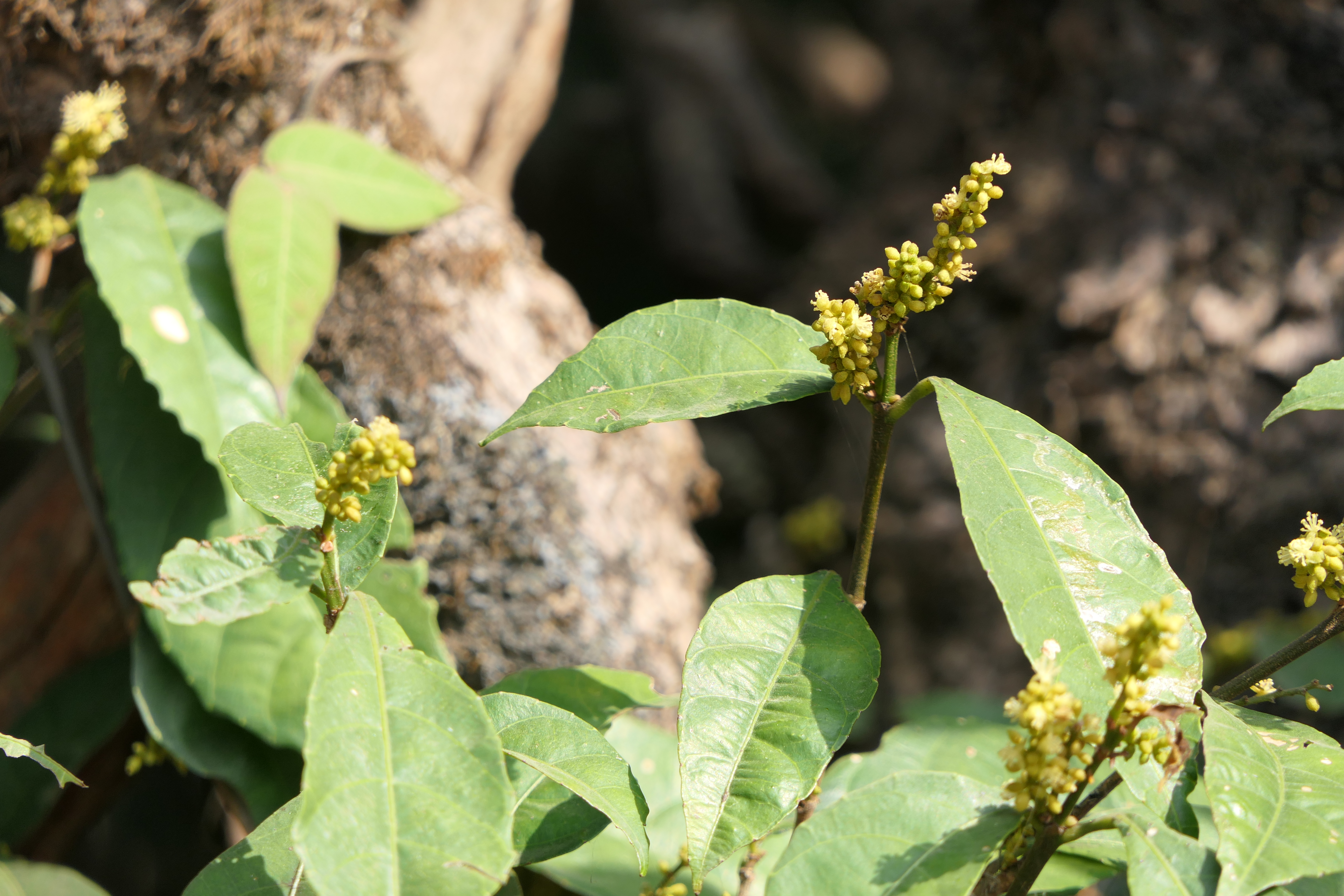
- In Maharashtra, India

Conservation status
- Least Concern (IUCN 3.1)

Scientific classification
- Kingdom: Plantae
- Clade: Tracheophytes
- Clade: Angiosperms
- Clade: Eudicots
- Clade: Rosids
- Order: Malpighiales
- Family: Euphorbiaceae
- Genus: Mallotus
- Species: M. resinosus

Binomial name
- Mallotus resinosus (Blanco) Merr.

Synonyms
- List: *Adelia resinosa Blanco; *Axenfeldia intermedia Baill.; *Claoxylon muricatum Wight; *Coelodiscus muricatus (Wight) Gagnep.; *Mallotus andamanicus Hook.f.; *Mallotus aureopunctatus (Dalzell) Müll.Arg.; *Mallotus beddomei Hook.f.; *Mallotus dispar var. psiloneurus Müll.Arg.; *Mallotus intermedius (Baill.) N.P.Balakr.; *Mallotus lawii Müll.Arg.; *Mallotus muricatus (Wight) Müll.Arg.; *Mallotus muricatus var. walkerae (Hook.f.) Pax & K.Hoffm.; *Mallotus resinosus var. muricatus (Wight) N.P.Balakr. & Chakrab.; *Mallotus resinosus var. stenanthus (Müll.Arg.) Susila & N.P.Balakr.; *Mallotus resinosus var. subramanyamii (J.L.Ellis) Chakrab.; *Mallotus sanguirensis Pax & K.Hoffm.; *Mallotus stenanthus Müll.Arg.; *Mallotus subramanyamii J.L.Ellis; *Mallotus viridis Welzen & Chayam.; *Mallotus walkerae Hook.f.; *Mallotus walkerae var. laxiflorus Hook.f.; *Rottlera aureopunctata Dalzell; *Rottlera muricata (Wight) Thwaites

= Mallotus resinosus =

Species of plant in the spurge family

Mallotus resinosus, the resinous kamala, is a species of 12 m (39 ft) tall shrub, evergreen plant in the family Euphorbiaceae. It is native to India, Sri Lanka to New Guinea and Australia. The plant is known as கருவாளிச்சீ (karuvalichchi) by Tamil people.

== Leaves ==
Elliptic to obovate; base attenuate; margin serrate.

== Flowers ==
Inflorescence - present, where male flowers are clustered and unbranched. Female flowers are also unbranched, but with 3 locules and few short spines.

== Fruits ==
Globose seeded capsule.

== Chemistry ==
Scientists found a simple coumarin, called Scopoletin from the root extraction of resinous kamala. It was identified as the active principle responsible for DNA cleavage activity during the extraction process. The chemical was once thought to only be found within plants of the genus Scolopia.
