= 6'-Deoxychalcone synthase =

Class of enzymes

Identifiers
- EC no.: 2.3.1.170
- CAS no.: 114308-23-5

Databases
- IntEnz: IntEnz view
- BRENDA: BRENDA entry
- ExPASy: NiceZyme view
- KEGG: KEGG entry
- MetaCyc: metabolic pathway
- PRIAM: profile
- PDB structures: RCSB PDB PDBe PDBsum
Search
- PMC: articles
- PubMed: articles
- NCBI: proteins

6'-deoxychalcone synthase (EC 2.3.1.170) is an enzyme that catalyzes the synthesis of the polyketide, isoliquiritigenin, from one unit of coumaroyl-CoA and three of malonyl-CoA. The enzyme requires reduced nicotinamide adenine dinucleotide phosphate (NADPH) to activate its substrate. It is present in Glycyrrhiza echinata (Russian licorice) and other leguminous plants, where it is part of the pathway to phytoalexins such as the flavanone, liquiritigenin.

coumaroyl-CoA
+ NADPH + 3
malonyl-CoA
H^{+}
3 CO_{2}
isoliquiritigenin
NADP^{+} +
4 coenzyme A

The enzyme belongs to the family of transferases, to be specific those acyltransferases transferring groups other than aminoacyl groups. The systematic name of this enzyme class is malonyl-CoA:4-coumaroyl-CoA malonyltransferase (cyclizing, reducing).
