= Shikimate O-hydroxycinnamoyltransferase =

Identifiers
- EC no.: 2.3.1.133
- CAS no.: 73904-44-6

Databases
- IntEnz: IntEnz view
- BRENDA: BRENDA entry
- ExPASy: NiceZyme view
- KEGG: KEGG entry
- MetaCyc: metabolic pathway
- PRIAM: profile
- PDB structures: RCSB PDB PDBe PDBsum
- Gene Ontology: AmiGO / QuickGO
Search
- PMC: articles
- PubMed: articles
- NCBI: proteins

Shikimate O-hydroxycinnamoyltransferase (EC 2.3.1.133) is an enzyme that catalyzes the chemical reaction

shikimic acid
+
coumaroyl-CoA
4-coumaroylshikimic acid
+ coenzyme A

The two substrates of this enzyme characterised from rye are shikimic acid and coumaroyl-CoA. Its products are 4-coumaroylshikimic acid and coenzyme A.

This enzyme belongs to the family of transferases, specifically those acyltransferases transferring groups other than aminoacyl groups. The systematic name of this enzyme class is 4-coumaroyl-CoA:shikimate O-(hydroxycinnamoyl)transferase. This enzyme is also called shikimate hydroxycinnamoyltransferase. This enzyme participates in phenylpropanoid biosynthesis.
