= 2-Coumarate reductase =

Class of enzymes

2-coumarate reductase

Identifiers
- EC no.: 1.3.1.11
- CAS no.: 37251-10-8

Databases
- IntEnz: IntEnz view
- BRENDA: BRENDA entry
- ExPASy: NiceZyme view
- KEGG: KEGG entry
- MetaCyc: metabolic pathway
- PRIAM: profile
- PDB structures: RCSB PDB PDBe PDBsum
- Gene Ontology: AmiGO / QuickGO
Search
- PMC: articles
- PubMed: articles
- NCBI: proteins

In enzymology, 2-coumarate reductase or melilotate dehydrogenase (EC 1.3.1.11) is an enzyme that catalyzes the chemical reaction

2-hydroxybenzenepropanoic acid
+ NAD^{+}
H^{+}
H^{+}
2-coumaric acid
+ NADH

The two substrates of this enzyme are 2-hydroxybenzenepropanoic acid (melilotic acid) and oxidised nicotinamide adenine dinucleotide (NAD^{+}). Its products are 2-coumaric acid, reduced NADH, and a proton.

This enzyme belongs to the family of oxidoreductases, specifically those acting on the CH-CH group of donor with NAD+ or NADP+ as acceptor. The systematic name of this enzyme class is 3-(2-hydroxyphenyl)propanoate:NAD+ oxidoreductase. This enzyme participates in phenylalanine metabolism.
