= Agmatine N4-coumaroyltransferase =

agmatine N4-coumaroyltransferase

Identifiers
- EC no.: 2.3.1.64
- CAS no.: 85030-72-4

Databases
- IntEnz: IntEnz view
- BRENDA: BRENDA entry
- ExPASy: NiceZyme view
- KEGG: KEGG entry
- MetaCyc: metabolic pathway
- PRIAM: profile
- PDB structures: RCSB PDB PDBe PDBsum
- Gene Ontology: AmiGO / QuickGO
Search
- PMC: articles
- PubMed: articles
- NCBI: proteins

In enzymology, an agmatine N4-coumaroyltransferase (EC 2.3.1.64) is an enzyme that catalyzes the chemical reaction

4-coumaroyl-CoA + agmatine $\rightleftharpoons$ CoA + N-(4-guanidinobutyl)-4-hydroxycinnamamide

Thus, the two substrates of this enzyme are 4-coumaroyl-CoA and agmatine, whereas its two products are CoA and N-(4-guanidinobutyl)-4-hydroxycinnamamide.

This enzyme belongs to the family of transferases, to be specific those acyltransferases transferring groups other than aminoacyl groups. The systematic name of this enzyme class is 4-coumaroyl-CoA:agmatine N4-coumaroyltransferase. Other names in common use include p-coumaroyl-CoA-agmatine N-p-coumaroyltransferase, agmatine coumaroyltransferase, and 4-coumaroyl-CoA:agmatine 4-N-coumaroyltransferase.
