= Caffeate 3,4-dioxygenase =

Enzyme

caffeate 3,4-dioxygenase

Identifiers
- EC no.: 1.13.11.22
- CAS no.: 37256-61-4

Databases
- IntEnz: IntEnz view
- BRENDA: BRENDA entry
- ExPASy: NiceZyme view
- KEGG: KEGG entry
- MetaCyc: metabolic pathway
- PRIAM: profile
- PDB structures: RCSB PDB PDBe PDBsum
- Gene Ontology: AmiGO / QuickGO
Search
- PMC: articles
- PubMed: articles
- NCBI: proteins

Caffeate 3,4-dioxygenase (EC 1.13.11.22) is an enzyme that catalyzes the chemical reaction

3,4-dihydroxy-trans-cinnamate + O_{2} $\rightleftharpoons$ 3-(2-carboxyethenyl)-cis,cis-muconate

Thus, the two substrates of this enzyme are 3,4-dihydroxy-trans-cinnamate (caffeic acid) and oxygen, whereas its product is 3-(2-carboxyethenyl)-cis,cis-muconate.

This enzyme belongs to the family of oxidoreductases, specifically those acting on single donors with O_{2} as oxidant and incorporation of two atoms of oxygen into the substrate (oxygenases). The oxygen incorporated need not be derived from O_{2}. The systematic name of this enzyme class is 3,4-dihydroxy-trans-cinnamate:oxygen 3,4-oxidoreductase (decyclizing). This enzyme participates in phenylpropanoid biodegradation.
