= 5-O-(4-coumaroyl)-D-quinate 3'-monooxygenase =

Class of enzymes

Identifiers
- EC no.: 1.14.13.36
- CAS no.: 112131-08-5

Databases
- IntEnz: IntEnz view
- BRENDA: BRENDA entry
- ExPASy: NiceZyme view
- KEGG: KEGG entry
- MetaCyc: metabolic pathway
- PRIAM: profile
- PDB structures: RCSB PDB PDBe PDBsum
- Gene Ontology: AmiGO / QuickGO
Search
- PMC: articles
- PubMed: articles
- NCBI: proteins

In enzymology, a 5-O-(4-coumaroyl)-D-quinate 3'-monooxygenase (EC 1.14.13.36) is an enzyme that catalyzes the chemical reaction

trans-5-O-(4-coumaroyl)-D-quinate + NADPH + H^{+} + O_{2} $\rightleftharpoons$ trans-5-O-caffeoyl-D-quinate + NADP^{+} + H_{2}O

The 4 substrates of this enzyme are trans-5-O-(4-coumaroyl)-D-quinate, NADPH, H^{+}, and O_{2}, whereas its 3 products are trans-5-O-caffeoyl-D-quinate, NADP^{+}, and H_{2}O.

This enzyme belongs to the family of oxidoreductases, specifically those acting on paired donors, with O2 as oxidant and incorporation or reduction of oxygen. The oxygen incorporated need not be derived from O2 with NADH or NADPH as one donor, and incorporation of one atom o oxygen into the other donor. The systematic name of this enzyme class is trans-5-O-(4-coumaroyl)-D-quinate,NADPH:oxygen oxidoreductase (3'-hydroxylating). Other names in common use include 5-O-(4-coumaroyl)-D-quinate/shikimate 3'-hydroxylase, and coumaroylquinate(coumaroylshikimate) 3'-monooxygenase. This enzyme participates in phenylpropanoid biosynthesis.
