= Coniferyl-alcohol glucosyltransferase =

Enzyme

Identifiers
- EC no.: 2.4.1.111
- CAS no.: 61116-23-2

Databases
- IntEnz: IntEnz view
- BRENDA: BRENDA entry
- ExPASy: NiceZyme view
- KEGG: KEGG entry
- MetaCyc: metabolic pathway
- PRIAM: profile
- PDB structures: RCSB PDB PDBe PDBsum
- Gene Ontology: AmiGO / QuickGO
Search
- PMC: articles
- PubMed: articles
- NCBI: proteins

Coniferyl-alcohol glucosyltransferase (EC 2.4.1.111) is an enzyme that catalyzes the chemical reaction

coniferyl alcohol
+ UDP-glucose
UDP
coniferin

The two substrates of this enzyme are coniferyl alcohol and UDP-glucose. Its products are coniferin and uridine diphosphate (UDP).

This enzyme belongs to the family of glycosyltransferases, specifically the hexosyltransferases. The systematic name of this enzyme class is UDP-glucose:coniferyl-alcohol 4'-beta-D-glucosyltransferase. Other names in common use include uridine diphosphoglucose-coniferyl alcohol glucosyltransferase, and UDP-glucose coniferyl alcohol glucosyltransferase. This enzyme participates in phenylpropanoid biosynthesis.
