= Pinosylvin =

Names
- Preferred IUPAC name 5-[(1E)-2-Phenylethen-1-yl]benzene-1,3-diol
- Other names (E)-3,5-Stilbenediol trans-3,5-Dihydroxystilbene

Identifiers
CAS Number	22139-77-1
3D model (JSmol)	Interactive image
ChEMBL	ChEMBL101506
ChemSpider	4444110
ECHA InfoCard	100.208.695
PubChem CID	5280457
UNII	881R434AIB
CompTox Dashboard (EPA)	DTXSID00895857
- InChI: InChI=1S/C14H12O2/c15-13-8-12(9-14(16)10-13)7-6-11-4-2-1-3-5-11/h1-10,15-16H/b7-6+ Key: YCVPRTHEGLPYPB-VOTSOKGWSA-N
- SMILES: C1=CC=C(C=C1)\C=C\C2=CC(=CC(=C2)O)O

Properties
Chemical formula	C_{14}H_{12}O_{2}
Molar mass	212.248 g·mol^{−1}
Appearance	white solid
Melting point	153 to 155 °C (307 to 311 °F; 426 to 428 K)
- Except where otherwise noted, data are given for materials in their standard state (at 25 °C [77 °F], 100 kPa). Infobox references

Pinosylvin is an organic compound with the formula C_{6}H_{5}CH=CHC_{6}H_{3}(OH)_{2}. A white solid, it is related to trans-stilbene, but with two hydroxy groups on one of the phenyl substituents. It is very soluble in many organic solvents, such as acetone.

== Occurrence ==
Pinosylvin is produced in plants in response to fungal infections, ozone-induced stress, and physical damage for example. It is a fungitoxin protecting the wood from fungal infection. It is present in the heartwood of Pinaceae and also found in Gnetum cleistostachyum.

Injected in rats, pinosylvin undergoes rapid glucuronidation and a poor bioavailability.

== Biosynthesis ==
Pinosylvin synthase, an enzyme, catalyzes the biosynthesis of pinosylvin from one unit of cinnamoyl-CoA and three of malonyl-CoA:

cinnamoyl-CoA
+ 3
malonyl-CoA
4 CO_{2}
pinosylvin
+ 4 coenzyme A

This biosynthesis is noteworthy because plant biosyntheses employing cinnamic acid as a starting point are rare compared to the more common use of p-coumaric acid. Two other compounds produced from cinnamic acid are anigorufone and curcumin.
