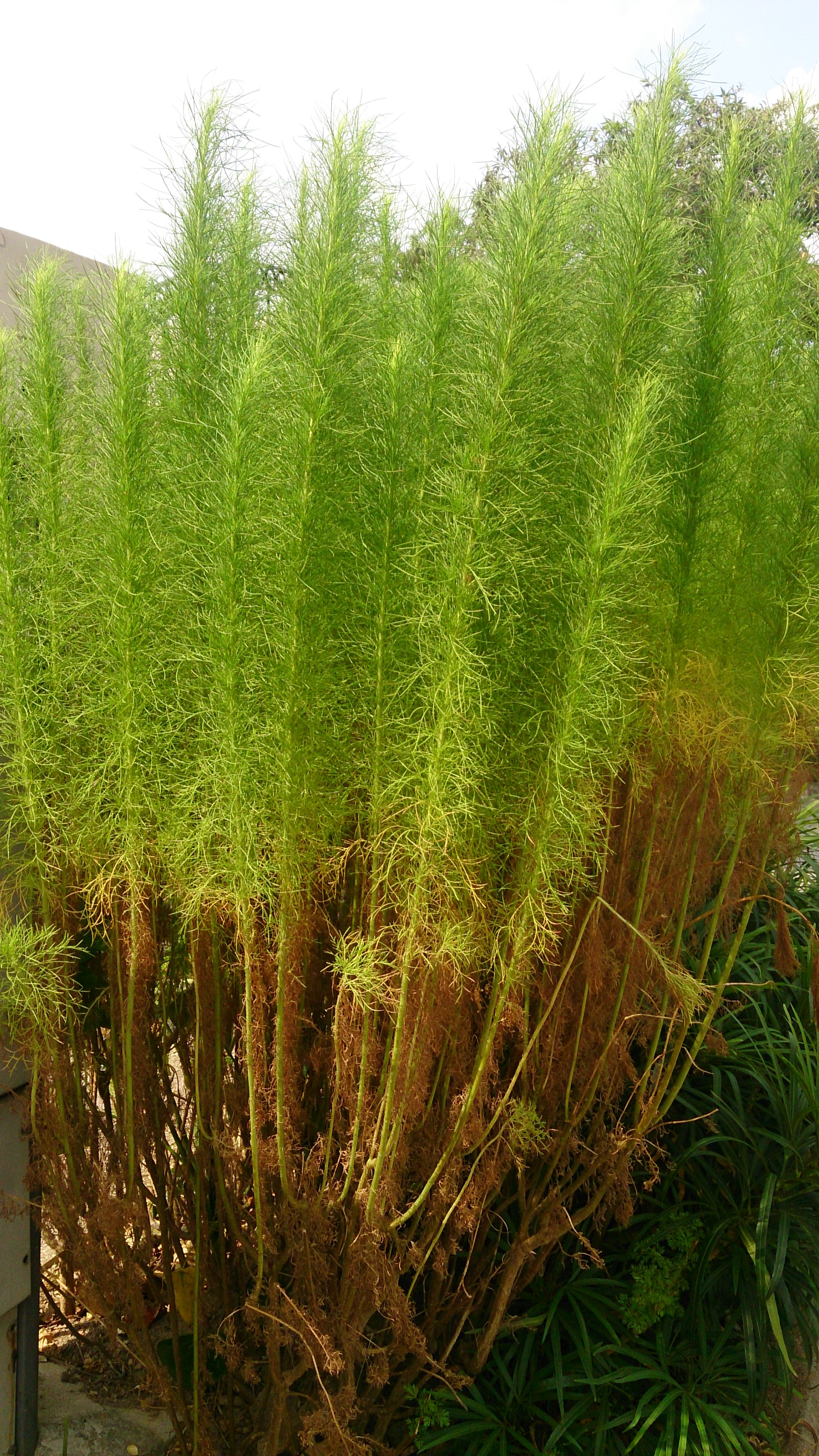

Scientific classification
- Kingdom: Plantae
- Clade: Tracheophytes
- Clade: Angiosperms
- Clade: Eudicots
- Clade: Asterids
- Order: Asterales
- Family: Asteraceae
- Genus: Artemisia
- Species: A. scoparia

Binomial name
- Artemisia scoparia Waldst. & Kit. 1802 not Maxim. 1859

Synonyms
- Synonymy: Artemisia capillaris Miq.; Artemisia capillaris var. scoparia (Waldst. & Kit.) Pamp.; Artemisia elegans Roxb. 1814 not Salisb. 1796; Artemisia gracilis L'Hér. ex DC.; Artemisia hallaisanensis var. formosana Pamp.; Artemisia kohatica Klatt; Artemisia piperita Pall. ex Ledeb.; Artemisia sachaliensis Tilesius ex Besser; Artemisia scoparioides Grossh.; Artemisia trichophylla Wall. ex DC.; Draconia capillaris (Thunb.) Soják; Draconia scoparia (Waldst. & Kit.) Soják; Oligosporus scoparius (Waldst. & Kit.) Less.

= Artemisia scoparia =

Species of flowering plant

Artemisia scoparia is a Eurasian species in the genus Artemisia, in the sunflower family. It is widespread across much of Eurasia from France to Japan, including China, India, Russia, Germany, Poland, central + southwest Asia, etc.

The English common name of Artemisia scoparia is virgate wormwood, capillary wormwood, or redstem wormwood. In Mandarin Chinese it is known as yīn chén (Traditional: 茵陳) and it is an important traditional Chinese medicine, and is considered interchangeable with Artemisia capillaris for that purpose. Its pollen can be allergenic.

== Chemical constituents ==
1. Capillarisin
2. Chlorogenic acid butyl ester
3. 6,7-Dimethylesculetin
4. Isosabandin
5. Magnolioside (isoscopoletin-β-D-glucopyranoside)
6. 7-Methoxycoumarin
7. 7-Methylesculetin
8. Sabandin A
9. Sabandin B
10. Scoparone (6,7-dimethoxycoumarin)
11. Scopoletin
12. β-Sitosterol
13. Capillin
