= Pinosylvin synthase =

Identifiers
- EC no.: 2.3.1.146
- CAS no.: 72994-49-1

Databases
- IntEnz: IntEnz view
- BRENDA: BRENDA entry
- ExPASy: NiceZyme view
- KEGG: KEGG entry
- MetaCyc: metabolic pathway
- PRIAM: profile
- PDB structures: RCSB PDB PDBe PDBsum
- Gene Ontology: AmiGO / QuickGO
Search
- PMC: articles
- PubMed: articles
- NCBI: proteins

Pinosylvin synthase (EC 2.3.1.146) is an enzyme that catalyzes the chemical reaction

cinnamoyl-CoA
+ 3
malonyl-CoA
4 CO_{2}
pinosylvin
+ 4 coenzyme A

The enzyme combines one unit of cinnamoyl-CoA with three of malonyl-CoA to form the stilbene, pinosylvin, with coenzyme A and carbon dioxide as byproducts. The product is produced in response to fungal attack on the pine tree Pinus sylvestris.

This enzyme belongs to the family of transferases, specifically those acyltransferases transferring groups other than aminoacyl groups. The systematic name of this enzyme class is malonyl-CoA:cinnamoyl-CoA malonyltransferase (cyclizing). Other names in common use include stilbene synthase, and pine stilbene synthase.
