= Coniferin beta-glucosidase =

Class of enzymes

Coniferin β-glucosidase

Identifiers
- EC no.: 3.2.1.126
- CAS no.: 83869-30-1

Databases
- BRENDA: enzyme data
- ExPASy: NiceZyme view
- KEGG: enzyme entry
- MetaCyc: metabolic pathway
- Rhea: reactions
- PDB structures: RCSB PDB PDBe PDBsum
- Gene Ontology: AmiGO / QuickGO
Search
- PMC: articles
- PubMed: articles
- NCBI: proteins

The enzyme coniferin β-glucosidase (EC 3.2.1.126) catalyzes the following chemical reaction:

coniferin
H_{2}O
coniferyl alcohol
+
D-glucose

The enzyme characterised from chickpea and Picea abies removes the glycoside unit from coniferin to give coniferyl alcohol and D-glucose.

The enzyme is a hydrolase, specifically a glycosidase that hydrolyses O- and S-glycosyl compounds. The systematic name is coniferin β-D-glucosidase. It is also called coniferin-hydrolyzing β-glucosidase.
