= Scopoletin glucosyltransferase =

Class of enzymes

Identifiers
- EC no.: 2.4.1.128
- CAS no.: 81210-69-7

Databases
- IntEnz: IntEnz view
- BRENDA: BRENDA entry
- ExPASy: NiceZyme view
- KEGG: KEGG entry
- MetaCyc: metabolic pathway
- PRIAM: profile
- PDB structures: RCSB PDB PDBe PDBsum
- Gene Ontology: AmiGO / QuickGO
Search
- PMC: articles
- PubMed: articles
- NCBI: proteins

Scopoletin glucosyltransferase (EC 2.4.1.128) is an enzyme that catalyzes the chemical reaction

scopoletin
+ UDP-glucose
scopolin

The two substrates of this enzyme characterised from tobacco and Duboisia myoporoides are the coumarin, scopoletin, and UDP-glucose. Its products are scopolin and uridine diphosphate (UDP).

This enzyme belongs to the family of glycosyltransferases, specifically the hexosyltransferases. The systematic name of this enzyme class is UDP-glucose:scopoletin O-beta-D-glucosyltransferase. Other names in common use include uridine diphosphoglucose-scopoletin glucosyltransferase, UDP-glucose:scopoletin glucosyltransferase, and SGTase.
