= O-Coumaric acid =

o-Coumaric acid
- Skeletal formula of o-coumaric acid

Names
- Preferred IUPAC name (2E)-3-(2-Hydroxyphenyl)prop-2-enoic acid
- Other names ortho-Coumaric acid 2-Hydroxycinnamic acid

Identifiers
CAS Number	614-60-8
3D model (JSmol)	Interactive image
ChEBI	CHEBI:18125
ChemSpider	553146
ECHA InfoCard	100.009.444
PubChem CID	637540
UNII	23AU5FZB9C
CompTox Dashboard (EPA)	DTXSID10883240
- InChI: InChI=1S/C9H8O3/c10-8-4-2-1-3-7(8)5-6-9(11)12/h1-6,10H,(H,11,12)/b6-5+ Key: PMOWTIHVNWZYFI-AATRIKPKSA-N; InChI=1/C9H8O3/c10-8-4-2-1-3-7(8)5-6-9(11)12/h1-6,10H,(H,11,12)/b6-5+ Key: PMOWTIHVNWZYFI-AATRIKPKBG
- SMILES: C1=CC=C(C(=C1)C=CC(=O)O)O

Properties
Chemical formula	C_{9}H_{8}O_{3}
Molar mass	164.16 g/mol

Hazards
- GHS labelling
Pictograms	(GHS06: Toxic) (GHS07: Exclamation mark)
Signal word	Danger
Hazard statements	H301, H315, H319, H335
Precautionary statements	P261, P264, P270, P271, P280, P301+P310, P302+P352, P304+P340, P305+P351+P338, P312, P321, P330, P332+P313, P337+P313, P362, P403+P233, P405, P501
- Except where otherwise noted, data are given for materials in their standard state (at 25 °C [77 °F], 100 kPa). Infobox references

o-Coumaric acid is a hydroxycinnamic acid, an organic compound that is a hydroxy derivative of cinnamic acid. There are three isomers of coumaric acids — o-coumaric acid, m-coumaric acid, and p-coumaric acid — that differ by the position of the hydroxy substitution of the phenyl group.

== Natural occurrence ==
o-Coumaric acid can be found in vinegar.

=== Biosynthesis ===
In some plants such as Melilotus species, o-coumaric acid is produced directly from cinnamic acid by the enzyme trans-cinnamate 2-monooxygenase.

cinnamic acid
+ NADPH
O_{2} + H^{+}
H_{2}O
o-coumaric acid
+ NADP^{+}

=== Metabolism ===
2-Coumarate reductase is an enzyme that converts o-coumaric acid to melilotic acid using reduced nicotinamide adenine dinucleotide (NADH). This enzyme participates in phenylalanine metabolism.

o-coumaric acid
+ NADH
H^{+}
H^{+}
melilotic acid
+ NAD^{+}

2-coumarate O-beta-glucosyltransferase forms a glucoside by transferring glucose from UDP-glucose:

o-Coumaric acid + UDP-glucose
UDP
melilotoside

This occurs in Melilotus alba and gives uridine diphosphate (UDP) as byproduct.
