= Cinnamyl-alcohol dehydrogenase =

Class of enzymes

cinnamyl-alcohol dehydrogenase

Identifiers
- EC no.: 1.1.1.195
- CAS no.: 55467-36-2

Databases
- IntEnz: IntEnz view
- BRENDA: BRENDA entry
- ExPASy: NiceZyme view
- KEGG: KEGG entry
- MetaCyc: metabolic pathway
- PRIAM: profile
- PDB structures: RCSB PDB PDBe PDBsum
- Gene Ontology: AmiGO / QuickGO
Search
- PMC: articles
- PubMed: articles
- NCBI: proteins

In enzymology, cinnamyl-alcohol dehydrogenase (EC 1.1.1.195) is an enzyme that catalyzes the chemical reaction

cinnamyl alcohol
+ NADP^{+}
H^{+}
H^{+}
cinnamaldehyde
+ NADPH

The two substrates of this enzyme are cinnamyl alcohol and oxidised nicotinamide adenine dinucleotide phosphate (NADP^{+}). Its products are cinnamaldehyde, reduced NADPH, and a proton.

This enzyme belongs to the family of oxidoreductases, specifically those acting on the CH-OH group of donor with NAD^{+} or NADP^{+} as acceptor. The systematic name of this enzyme class is cinnamyl-alcohol:NADP^{+} oxidoreductase. Other names in common use include cinnamyl alcohol dehydrogenase, and CAD. This enzyme participates in phenylpropanoid biosynthesis.

== Structural studies ==
As of late 2007, 4 structures have been solved for this class of enzymes, with PDB accession codes 1YQD, 1YQX, 2CF5, and 2CF6.
