= Scopolin =

Names
- IUPAC name 7-(β-D-Glucopyranosyloxy)-6-methoxy-2H-1-benzopyran-2-one
- Systematic IUPAC name 6-Methoxy-7-{[(2S,3R,4S,5S,6R)-3,4,5-trihydroxy-6-(hydroxymethyl)oxan-2-yl]oxy}-2H-1-benzopyran-2-one

Identifiers
CAS Number	531-44-2
3D model (JSmol)	Interactive image
ChEBI	CHEBI:16065
ChemSpider	388609
PubChem CID	439514
UNII	1Y49270PY8
CompTox Dashboard (EPA)	DTXSID20967621
- InChI: InChI=1S/C16H18O9/c1-22-9-4-7-2-3-12(18)23-8(7)5-10(9)24-16-15(21)14(20)13(19)11(6-17)25-16/h2-5,11,13-17,19-21H,6H2,1H3/t11-,13-,14+,15-,16-/m1/s1 Key: SGTCGCCQZOUMJJ-YMILTQATSA-N; InChI=1/C16H18O9/c1-22-9-4-7-2-3-12(18)23-8(7)5-10(9)24-16-15(21)14(20)13(19)11(6-17)25-16/h2-5,11,13-17,19-21H,6H2,1H3/t11-,13-,14+,15-,16-/m1/s1 Key: SGTCGCCQZOUMJJ-YMILTQATBT
- SMILES: COC1=C(C=C2C(=C1)C=CC(=O)O2)O[C@H]3[C@@H]([C@H]([C@@H]([C@H](O3)CO)O)O)O

Properties
Chemical formula	C_{16}H_{18}O_{9}
Molar mass	354.311 g·mol^{−1}
- Except where otherwise noted, data are given for materials in their standard state (at 25 °C [77 °F], 100 kPa). Infobox references

Scopolin is a glucoside of scopoletin formed by the action of the enzyme scopoletin glucosyltransferase. It occurs in Chamaemelum nobile.

== Biosynthesis ==
Scopoletin glucosyltransferase transfers a glucose unit from UDP-glucose to form scopoletin from scopolin:

scopoletin
+ UDP-glucose
scopolin

The enzyme has been characterised from tobacco and Duboisia myoporoides.
