= Trans-cinnamate 2-monooxygenase =

Class of enzymes

Identifiers
- EC no.: 1.14.13.14
- CAS no.: 53126-56-0

Databases
- IntEnz: IntEnz view
- BRENDA: BRENDA entry
- ExPASy: NiceZyme view
- KEGG: KEGG entry
- MetaCyc: metabolic pathway
- PRIAM: profile
- PDB structures: RCSB PDB PDBe PDBsum
- Gene Ontology: AmiGO / QuickGO
Search
- PMC: articles
- PubMed: articles
- NCBI: proteins

Trans-cinnamate 2-monooxygenase (EC 1.14.13.14) is an enzyme that catalyzes the chemical reaction

cinnamic acid
+ NADPH
O_{2} + H^{+}
H_{2}O
o-coumaric acid
+ NADP^{+}

The four substrates of this enzyme are cinnamic acid, reduced nicotinamide adenine dinucleotide phosphate (NADPH), oxygen, and a proton. Its products are o-coumaric acid, oxidised NADP^{+}, and water.

This enzyme belongs to the family of oxidoreductases, specifically those acting on paired donors, with O2 as oxidant and incorporation or reduction of oxygen. The oxygen incorporated need not be derived from O2 with NADH or NADPH as one donor, and incorporation of one atom o oxygen into the other donor. The systematic name of this enzyme class is trans-cinnamate,NADPH:oxygen oxidoreductase (2-hydroxylating). Other names in common use include cinnamic acid 2-hydroxylase, cinnamate 2-monooxygenase, cinnamic 2-hydroxylase, cinnamate 2-hydroxylase, and trans-cinnamic acid 2-hydroxylase. This enzyme participates in phenylalanine metabolism and phenylpropanoid biosynthesis.
