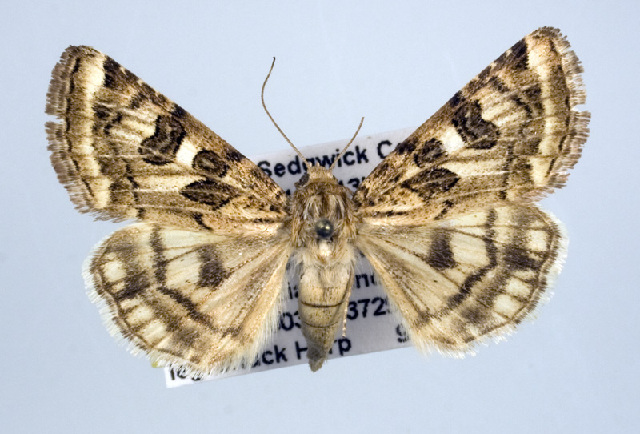

Scientific classification
- Kingdom: Animalia
- Phylum: Arthropoda
- Class: Insecta
- Order: Lepidoptera
- Superfamily: Noctuoidea
- Family: Noctuidae
- Genus: Schinia
- Species: S. nuchalis

Binomial name
- Schinia nuchalis Grote, 1878

Synonyms
- Protoschinia nuchalis (Grote 1878)

= Schinia nuchalis =

Species of moth

Schinia nuchalis, the spotted sage moth, is a moth of the family Noctuidae. The species was first described by Augustus Radcliffe Grote in 1878. It is found from the Great Plains and Great Basin, from southern Saskatchewan, Alberta and British Columbia south to northern Arizona. The Eurasian Schinia scutosa is no longer considered a synonym of Schinia nuchalis.

The wingspan is 31–32 mm. Adults are on wing in July depending on the location.

The larvae feed on Artemisia dracunculus, Artemisia campestris and possibly other sages.
