= Scopoletin =

- Chemical structure of scopoletin

Names
- Preferred IUPAC name 7-Hydroxy-6-methoxy-2H-1-benzopyran-2-one
- Other names 7-Hydroxy-6-methoxy-2H-chromen-2-one; 7-Hydroxy-6-methoxychromen-2-one; Gelseminic acid Chrysatropic acid Scopoletine; 6-Methylesculetin; Murrayetin; Scopoletol; Escopoletin; Methylesculetin; 6-O-Methylesculetin; Esculetin-6-methyl ether 7-Hydroxy-5-methoxycoumarin; 6-Methoxyumbelliferone

Identifiers
CAS Number	92-61-5
3D model (JSmol)	Interactive image
ChemSpider	4444113
ECHA InfoCard	100.001.975
PubChem CID	5280460
UNII	KLF1HS0SXJ
CompTox Dashboard (EPA)	DTXSID0075368
- InChI: InChI=1S/C10H8O4/c1-13-9-4-6-2-3-10(12)14-8(6)5-7(9)11/h2-5,11H,1H3 Key: RODXRVNMMDRFIK-UHFFFAOYSA-N
- SMILES: COC1=C(C=C2C(=C1)C=CC(=O)O2)O

Properties
Chemical formula	C_{10}H_{8}O_{4}
Molar mass	192.16 g/mol
- Except where otherwise noted, data are given for materials in their standard state (at 25 °C [77 °F], 100 kPa). Infobox references

Scopoletin is a coumarin found in the root of plants in the genus Scopolia such as Scopolia carniolica and Scopolia japonica, in chicory, in Artemisia scoparia, in the roots and leaves of stinging nettle (Urtica dioica), in the passion flower, in Brunfelsia, in Viburnum prunifolium, in Solanum nigrum, in Datura metel, in Mallotus resinosus, and in Kleinhovia hospita. It can also be found in fenugreek, vinegar, some whiskies and in dandelion coffee. A similar coumarin is scoparone. Scopoletin is highly fluorescent when dissolved in DMSO or water and is regularly used as a fluorimetric assay for the detection of hydrogen peroxide in conjunction with horseradish peroxidase. When oxidized, its fluorescence is strongly suppressed.

== Chemistry ==
=== Biosynthesis ===
Like most phenylpropanoids, the biosynthetic precursor to scopoletin acid is 4-coumaroyl-CoA. Scopoletin is derived from 1,2-benzopyrones which is the core structure of coumarins formed through hydroxylation of cinnamates, trans/cis isomerization of the side chain, and lactonization. And CYP98A (C3’H) are enzymes belonging to the cytochrome P450 family that catalyze the meta-hydroxylation of p-coumarate derivatives, an important step in the phenylpropanoid pathway. For scopoletin, most of biosynthetic investigations are based on Arabidopsis thaliana.

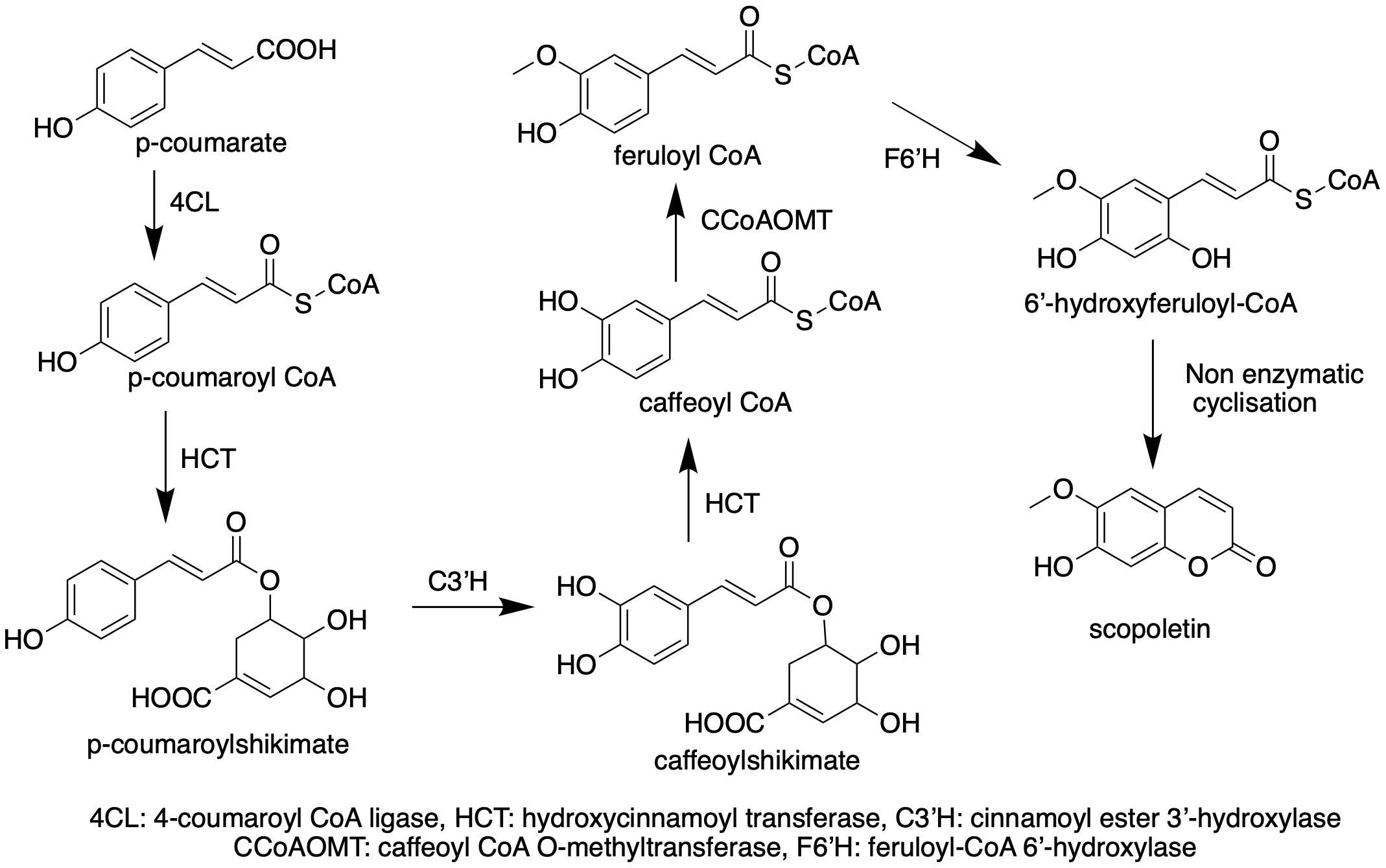
Biosynthetic pathway of Scopoletin

=== Derivatives/Related Compounds ===
Scopolin is a glucoside of scopoletin formed by the action of the enzyme scopoletin glucosyltransferase.

scopoletin
+ UDP-glucose
scopolin

The enzyme has been characterised from tobacco and Duboisia myoporoides.

== Uses ==
=== Traditional medicine ===
It was usually used for rheumatic arthritis therapy in traditional Chinese medicine.
