= 4-Coumarate-CoA ligase =

InterPro Family

4-Coumarate—CoA ligase

Identifiers
- EC no.: 6.2.1.12
- CAS no.: 37332-51-7

Databases
- IntEnz: IntEnz view
- BRENDA: BRENDA entry
- ExPASy: NiceZyme view
- KEGG: KEGG entry
- MetaCyc: metabolic pathway
- PRIAM: profile
- PDB structures: RCSB PDB PDBe PDBsum
- Gene Ontology: AmiGO / QuickGO
Search
- PMC: articles
- PubMed: articles
- NCBI: proteins

4-coumarate—CoA ligase (EC 6.2.1.12) is an enzyme that catalyzes the chemical reaction

p-Coumaric acid
+ coenzyme A
ATP
AMP
Coumaroyl-CoA

The enzyme produces the thioester of p-coumaric acid with coenzyme A. The reaction is driven to completion by the energy produced by the hydrolysis of adenosine triphosphate (ATP) to its monophosphate AMP, releasing diphosphate. This reaction is an important step in the biosynthesis of phenylpropanoids.

This enzyme belongs to the family of ligases, to be specific those forming carbon-sulfur bonds as acid-thiol ligases. The systematic name of this enzyme class is 4-coumarate:CoA ligase (AMP-forming). Other names in common use include 4-coumaroyl-CoA synthetase, p-coumaroyl CoA ligase, p-coumaryl coenzyme A synthetase, p-coumaryl-CoA synthetase, p-coumaryl-CoA ligase, feruloyl CoA ligase, hydroxycinnamoyl CoA synthetase, 4-coumarate:coenzyme A ligase, caffeoyl coenzyme A synthetase, p-hydroxycinnamoyl coenzyme A synthetase, feruloyl coenzyme A synthetase, sinapoyl coenzyme A synthetase, 4-coumaryl-CoA synthetase, hydroxycinnamate:CoA ligase, p-coumaryl-CoA ligase, p-hydroxycinnamic acid:CoA ligase, and 4CL.
