= Scoparone =

Names
- Preferred IUPAC name 6,7-Dimethoxy-2H-1-benzopyran-2-one
- Other names 6,7-Dimethoxycoumarin; 6,7-Dimethylesculetin; Esculetin dimethyl ether; Scoparon; Escoparone

Identifiers
| CAS Number | 120-08-1 |
| 3D model (JSmol) | Interactive image |
| ChEBI | CHEBI:9055 |
| ChemSpider | 8110 |
| ECHA InfoCard | 100.003.972 |
| PubChem CID | 8417 |
| UNII | H5841PDT4Y |
| CompTox Dashboard (EPA) | DTXSID10152640 |
- InChI: InChI=1S/C11H10O4/c1-13-9-5-7-3-4-11(12)15-8(7)6-10(9)14-2/h3-6H,1-2H3 Key: GUAFOGOEJLSQBT-UHFFFAOYSA-N; InChI=1/C11H10O4/c1-13-9-5-7-3-4-11(12)15-8(7)6-10(9)14-2/h3-6H,1-2H3 Key: GUAFOGOEJLSQBT-UHFFFAOYAO
- SMILES: O=C/2Oc1cc(OC)c(OC)cc1\C=C\2

Properties
| Chemical formula | C_{11}H_{10}O_{4} |
| Molar mass | 206.197 g·mol^{−1} |
| Melting point | 143 to 145 °C (289 to 293 °F; 416 to 418 K) |
- Except where otherwise noted, data are given for materials in their standard state (at 25 °C [77 °F], 100 kPa). Infobox references

Scoparone is a natural organic compound with the molecular formula C_{11}H_{10}O_{4}. It is found in the Chinese herb Artemisia scoparia and has been studied for its potential pharmacological properties including immunosuppression and vasorelaxation.
