= Coumaroyl-CoA =

Coumaroyl-Coenzyme A

Names
- IUPAC name 3′-O-Phosphonoadenosine 5′-[(3R)-3-hydroxy-4-({3-[(2-{[(2E)-3-(4-hydroxyphenyl)prop-2-enoyl]sulfanyl}ethyl)amino]-3-oxopropyl}amino)-2,2-dimethyl-4-oxobutyl dihydrogen diphosphate]
- Systematic IUPAC name [(2R,3S,4R,5R)-5-(6-Amino-9H-purin-9-yl)-4-hydroxy-3-(phosphonooxy)oxolan-2-yl]methyl (3R)-3-hydroxy-4-({3-[(2-{[(2E)-3-(4-hydroxyphenyl)prop-2-enoyl]sulfanyl}ethyl)amino]-3-oxopropyl}amino)-2,2-dimethyl-4-oxobutyl dihydrogen diphosphate
- Other names 4-Coumaroyl-CoA p-Coumaroyl-CoA; 4-Hydroxycinnamoyl-CoA

Identifiers
CAS Number	119785-99-8
3D model (JSmol)	Interactive image
ChemSpider	4944344
KEGG	C00223
PubChem CID	6440013
UNII	S9S49N6ER4
CompTox Dashboard (EPA)	DTXSID001028841
- InChI: InChI=1S/C30H42N7O18P3S/c1-30(2,25(42)28(43)33-10-9-20(39)32-11-12-59-21(40)8-5-17-3-6-18(38)7-4-17)14-52-58(49,50)55-57(47,48)51-13-19-24(54-56(44,45)46)23(41)29(53-19)37-16-36-22-26(31)34-15-35-27(22)37/h3-8,15-16,19,23-25,29,38,41-42H,9-14H2,1-2H3,(H,32,39)(H,33,43)(H,47,48)(H,49,50)(H2,31,34,35)(H2,44,45,46)/b8-5+/t19-,23-,24-,25+,29-/m1/s1 Key: DMZOKBALNZWDKI-MATMFAIHSA-N; InChI=1/C30H42N7O18P3S/c1-30(2,25(42)28(43)33-10-9-20(39)32-11-12-59-21(40)8-5-17-3-6-18(38)7-4-17)14-52-58(49,50)55-57(47,48)51-13-19-24(54-56(44,45)46)23(41)29(53-19)37-16-36-22-26(31)34-15-35-27(22)37/h3-8,15-16,19,23-25,29,38,41-42H,9-14H2,1-2H3,(H,32,39)(H,33,43)(H,47,48)(H,49,50)(H2,31,34,35)(H2,44,45,46)/b8-5+/t19-,23-,24-,25+,29-/m1/s1 Key: DMZOKBALNZWDKI-MATMFAIHBG
- SMILES: CC(C)(COP(=O)(O)OP(=O)(O)OC[C@@H]1[C@H]([C@H]([C@@H](O1)N2C=NC3=C(N=CN=C32)N)O)OP(=O)(O)O)[C@H](C(=O)NCCC(=O)NCCSC(=O)/C=C/C4=CC=C(C=C4)O)O

Properties
Chemical formula	C_{30}H_{42}N_{7}O_{18}P_{3}S
Molar mass	913.67 g/mol
- Except where otherwise noted, data are given for materials in their standard state (at 25 °C [77 °F], 100 kPa). verify (what is ?) Infobox references

Coumaroyl-coenzyme A is the thioester of coenzyme-A and coumaric acid. Coumaroyl-coenzyme A is a central intermediate in the biosynthesis of myriad natural products found in plants. These products include lignols (precursors to lignin and lignocellulose), flavonoids, isoflavonoids, coumarins, aurones, stilbenes, catechin, and other phenylpropanoids.

== Biosynthesis and significance ==
It is generated in nature from phenylalanine, which is converted by PAL to trans-cinnamate. Trans-cinnamate is hydroxylated by trans-cinnamate 4-monooxygenase to give 4-hydroxycinnamate (i.e, coumarate). Coumarate is condensed with coenzyme-A in the presence of 4-coumarate-CoA ligase:

ATP + 4-coumarate + CoA $\rightleftharpoons$ AMP + diphosphate + 4-coumaroyl-CoA.

== Enzymes using Coumaroyl-Coenzyme A ==
- Anthocyanin 3-O-glucoside 6''-O-hydroxycinnamoyltransferase
- Anthocyanin 5-aromatic acyltransferase
- Chalcone synthase
- 4-Coumarate-CoA ligase
- 6'-Deoxychalcone synthase
- Agmatine N4-coumaroyltransferase
- Flavonol-3-O-triglucoside O-coumaroyltransferase
- Naringenin-chalcone synthase
- Shikimate O-hydroxycinnamoyltransferase
- Trihydroxystilbene synthase
