= Caryophyllene =

Natural bicyclic sesquiterpene

- beta-caryophyllene

Names
- Preferred IUPAC name (1R,4E,9S)-4,11,11-Trimethyl-8-methylidenebicyclo[7.2.0]undec-4-ene
- Other names β-Caryophyllene trans-(1R,9S)-8-Methylene-4,11,11-trimethylbicyclo[7.2.0]undec-4-ene

Identifiers
CAS Number	87-44-5
3D model (JSmol)	Interactive image
ChEBI	CHEBI:10357
ChEMBL	ChEMBL445740
ChemSpider	4444848
DrugBank	DB16854
ECHA InfoCard	100.001.588
EC Number	201-746-1
KEGG	C09629
PubChem CID	5281515
UNII	BHW853AU9H
CompTox Dashboard (EPA)	DTXSID8024739
- InChI: InChI=1S/C15H24/c1-11-6-5-7-12(2)13-10-15(3,4)14(13)9-8-11/h6,13-14H,2,5,7-10H2,1,3-4H3/b11-6+/t13-,14-/m1/s1 Key: NPNUFJAVOOONJE-GFUGXAQUSA-N; InChI=1/C15H24/c1-11-6-5-7-12(2)13-10-15(3,4)14(13)9-8-11/h6,13-14H,2,5,7-10H2,1,3-4H3/b11-6+/t13-,14-/m1/s1 Key: NPNUFJAVOOONJE-GFUGXAQUBC
- SMILES: C1(=C)\CC/C=C(/CC[C@@H]2[C@@H]1CC2(C)C)C

Properties
Chemical formula	C_{15}H_{24}
Molar mass	204.357 g·mol^{−1}
Density	0.9052 g/cm^{3} (17 °C)
Boiling point	262–264 °C (504–507 °F; 535–537 K)

Hazards
- GHS labelling
Pictograms	(GHS07: Exclamation mark) (GHS08: Health hazard)
Signal word	Warning
Hazard statements	H304, H317
Precautionary statements	P261, P272, P280, P301+P316, P302+P352, P321, P331, P333+P317, P362+P364, P405, P501
- Except where otherwise noted, data are given for materials in their standard state (at 25 °C [77 °F], 100 kPa). verify (what is ?) Infobox references

Caryophyllene (/ˌkærioʊˈfɪliːn/), more formally (−)-β-caryophyllene (BCP), is a natural bicyclic sesquiterpene that occurs widely in nature. Caryophyllene is notable for having a cyclobutane ring, as well as a trans-double bond in a 9-membered ring, both rarities in nature.

== Production ==
Caryophyllene can be produced synthetically, but it is invariably obtained from natural sources because it is widespread. It is a constituent of many essential oils, especially clove oil, the oil from the stems and flowers of Syzygium aromaticum (cloves), the essential oil of Cannabis sativa, copaiba, rosemary, and hops. It is usually found as a mixture with isocaryophyllene (the cis double bond isomer) and α-humulene (obsolete name: α-caryophyllene), a ring-opened isomer.

Caryophyllene is one of the chemical compounds that contributes to the aroma of black pepper.

== Basic research ==
β-Caryophyllene is under basic research for its potential action as an agonist of the cannabinoid receptor type 2 (CB_{2} receptor). In other basic studies, β-caryophyllene has a binding affinity of K_{i} = 155 nM at the CB_{2} receptors.

β-Caryophyllene has the highest cannabinoid activity compared to the ring opened isomer α-caryophyllene humulene which may modulate CB_{2} activity. To compare binding, cannabinol binds to the CB_{2} receptors as a partial agonist with an affinity of K_{i} = 126.4 nM, while delta-9-tetrahydrocannabinol binds to the CB_{2} receptors as a partial agonist with an affinity of K_{i} = 36 nM.

== Safety ==
Caryophyllene has been given generally recognized as safe (GRAS) designation by the FDA and is approved by the FDA for use as a food additive, typically for flavoring. Rats given up to 700 mg/kg daily for 90 days did not produce any significant toxic effects. Caryophyllene has an LD_{50} of 5,000 mg/kg in mice.

== Metabolism and derivatives ==
14-Hydroxycaryophyllene oxide (C_{15}H_{24}O_{2}) was isolated from the urine of rabbits treated with (−)-caryophyllene (C_{15}H_{24}). The X-ray crystal structure of 14-hydroxycaryophyllene (as its acetate derivative) has been reported.

The metabolism of caryophyllene progresses through (−)-caryophyllene oxide (C_{15}H_{24}O) since the latter compound also afforded 14-hydroxycaryophyllene (C_{15}H_{24}O) as a metabolite.

Caryophyllene (C_{15}H_{24}) → caryophyllene oxide (C_{15}H_{24}O) → 14-hydroxycaryophyllene (C_{15}H_{24}O) → 14-hydroxycaryophyllene oxide (C_{15}H_{24}O_{2}).

Caryophyllene oxide, in which the alkene group of caryophyllene has become an epoxide, is the component responsible for cannabis identification by drug-sniffing dogs and is also an approved food additive, often as flavoring. Caryophyllene oxide may have negligible cannabinoid activity.

== Natural sources ==
The approximate quantity of caryophyllene in the essential oil of each source is given in square brackets ([ ]):

- Cannabis (Cannabis sativa) [3.8–37.5% of cannabis flower essential oil]
- Black caraway (Carum nigrum) [7.8%]
- Cloves (Syzygium aromaticum) [1.7–19.5% of clove bud essential oil]
- Hops (Humulus lupulus) [5.1–14.5%]
- Basil (Ocimum spp.) [5.3–10.5% O. gratissimum; 4.0–19.8% O. micranthum]
- Oregano (Origanum vulgare) [4.9–15.7%]
- Black pepper (Piper nigrum) [7.29%]
- Lavender (Lavandula angustifolia) [4.62–7.55% of lavender oil]
- Rosemary (Rosmarinus officinalis) [0.1–8.3%]
- True cinnamon (Cinnamomum verum) [6.9–11.1%]
- Malabathrum (Cinnamomum tamala) [25.3%]
- Ylang-ylang (Cananga odorata) [3.1–10.7%]
- Copaiba oil (Copaifera)

=== Biosynthesis ===
Caryophyllene is a common sesquiterpene among plant species. It is biosynthesized from the common terpene precursors dimethylallyl pyrophosphate (DMAPP) and isopentenyl pyrophosphate (IPP). First, single units of DMAPP and IPP are reacted via an S_{N}1-type reaction with the loss of pyrophosphate, catalyzed by the enzyme GPPS2, to form geranyl pyrophosphate (GPP). This further reacts with a second unit of IPP, also via an S_{N}1-type reaction catalyzed by the enzyme IspA, to form farnesyl pyrophosphate (FPP). Finally, FPP undergoes QHS1 enzyme-catalyzed intramolecular cyclization to form caryophyllene.

Biosynthesis of caryophyllene

== Compendial status ==
- Food Chemicals Codex
