= Hoary basil =

Hoary basil may refer to a number of plant species:

- Pitotecnanthemum incanum (a.k.a. Hoary mountainmint)
- Ocimum × africanum
- Ocimum americanum or Ocimum canum
- Ocimum kilimandscharicum
