= African blue basil =

Variety of flowering plants

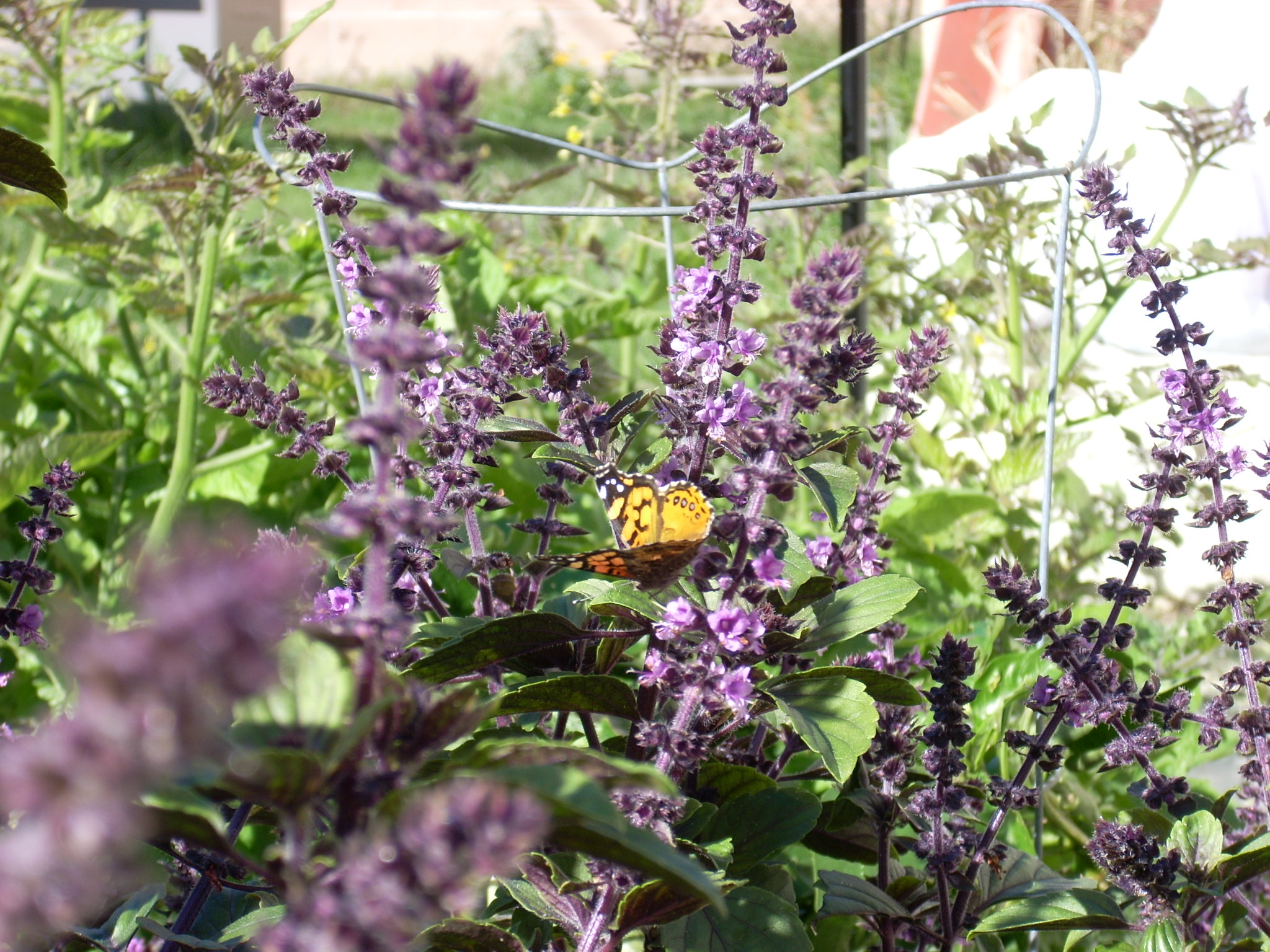
- Hybrid parentage: Ocimum kilimandscharicum × Ocimum basilicum
- Cultivar: 'Dark Opal'
- Origin: Peter Borchard, Companion Plants, Athens, Ohio, 1983

African blue basil (Ocimum kilimandscharicum × basilicum 'Dark Opal') is a hybrid basil variety, a cross between camphor basil and dark opal basil. It is one of a few types of basil that are perennial. African blue basil plants are sterile, unable to produce seeds of their own, and can only be propagated by cuttings.

This particular breed of basil has a strong camphor scent, inherited from Ocimum kilimandscharicum (camphor basil), its East African parent. It is included into the Lamiaceae (mint) family. The concentration of camphor is 22% (compared with 61% for O. kilimandscharicum). The concentration of the other major aroma compounds, linalool (55%), and 1,8-cineole (15%) is comparable to many basil cultivars.

The camphor parent gives this basil a taste different from most basils, and it is fully edible. It can be used in a fruit tea or cocktail. African blue basil grows better in indoor settings than many other herbs.

The leaves of African blue basil start out purple when young, only growing green as the given leaf grows to its full size, and even then retaining purple veins. Based on other purple basils, the color is from anthocyanins, especially cyanidin-3-(di-p-coumarylglucoside)-5-glucoside, but also other cyanidin-based and peonidin-based compounds.

It blooms profusely like an annual, but being sterile can never go to seed. It is also taller than many basil cultivars. These blooms are very good at attracting bees and other pollinators.

Since the African blue basil is sterile and doesn't produce seeds, it stays in bloom for a longer season, this attracts pollinators and helps maintain outdoor ecosystems. All parts of the plant (stem, flowers, and leaves) are safe to consume. The plant is incorporated by many chefs in a wide range of culinary practices.

== See also ==
- List of basil cultivars
