= Red rubin basil =

Variety of dark opal basil

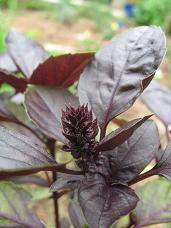
Red rubin basil

Red rubin basil (Ocimum basilicum 'Purpurascens') is an improved variety of Dark opal basil. Like many culinary basils, it is a cultivar of Ocimum basilicum (sweet basil). This basil variety has unusual reddish-purple leaves, and a stronger flavour than sweet basil, making it most appealing for salads and garnishes. It is a fast-growing annual herb that reaches a height of approximately 70 cm (2.3 ft).
