= Mrs. Burns' Lemon basil =

Basil variety

Mrs. Burns lemon basil
- Species: Ocimum basilicum var. citriodora
- Cultivar: 'Mrs Burns' Lemon' or 'Mrs. Burns' Famous Lemon'
- Origin: Janet Burns, Carlsbad, New Mexico, 1920s

Mrs. Burns' Lemon basil (Ocimum basilicum var. citriodora 'Mrs Burns' Lemon') is an heirloom cultivar of sweet basil (Ocimum basilicum) from New Mexico in the United States. Compared to lemon basil, which is a different species of basil (O. × citriodorum), in Mrs. Burns lemon basil the lemon flavor is more intense, the leaves are larger, and the plant itself is more robust.

== Origin and taxonomy ==
Mrs. Burns lemon basil is named after Janet Burns, an organic gardener in Carlsbad, New Mexico who introduced it in 1939; she obtained the seeds from a neighbor who had been growing it since the 1920s. Although Mrs. Burns lemon basil is considered a type of "lemon basil", it is not closely related to lemon basil. Mrs. Burns (O. basilicum var. citriodora) is a variety of sweet basil (O. basilicum). Lemon basil (O. × citriodorum), in contrast, is a hybrid between sweet basil and hoary basil (O. americanum), also known as African basil (not to be confused with O. gratissimum).

== Description ==
Mrs. Burns lemon basil grows 18–36 in (46–91 cm) tall and 12–24 in (30–61 cm) wide. It has bright green leaves about 3 in (8 cm) long and white flowers that are tinged with pink. The leaves are very slightly serrated, and the inflorescence is in the form of a thyrse. It has the strongest lemon scent and flavor of all the lemon basils, and also has undertones of cinnamon and mint and hints of spice along with a strong floral note. The strong lemon scent and taste is due to a high content of citral, while the floral fragrance comes from linalool.

As a variety of O. basilicum, in Mrs. Burns lemon basil the calyx has five lobes, with a single-lobed posterior (upper) lip and a four-lobed anterior (bottom) lip. The posterior lip is decurrent on the tube. The throat of the calyx is open and bearded with a ring of hairs just below the mouth. The lateral lobes on the anterior lip are lanceolate and symmetrical. The tube of the corolla is dorsally gibbous at the midpoint at a point opposite of the appendage of the posterior stamen. Mrs. Burns lemon basil has four stamens, with an anterior pair near the corolla mouth and a posterior pair near the corolla base. The ovary is divided into four parts, which develop into single-seeded nutlets or mericarps. The nutlets produce copious mucilage when wet.

Since it belongs to the O. basilicum clade, Mrs. Burns lemon basil is tetraploid (2n = 4x = 48), with a monoploid number of 12.

== Cultivation ==
Mrs. Burns lemon basil readily self-seeds, and, being from arid New Mexico, it tolerates heat and dryness well. It blooms late in the season and is slow to bolt. It is a tender perennial but is typically grown as an annual. Like many basils, it prefers fertile, well-drained soil and 6 to 8 hours of full sunlight per day. The flowers should be pinched to prevent the leaves from becoming bitter. Mrs. Burns lemon basil can be repeatedly harvested by taking a few leaves at a time and should be harvested periodically to encourage regrowth.

== Uses ==
Mrs. Burns lemon basil is well suited for teas, salads, soups, and vinegars. It is also excellent in desserts and baked goods, and it complements fish and chicken well.
