= Mammoth basil =

Variety of flowering plant

Mammoth basil is a lettuce leaf basil variety, originating from Italy. Like many culinary basils, it is a cultivar of Ocimum basilicum (sweet basil). The plant grows to approximately 18 inches tall, and produces large ruffled leaves with a jagged edge. The flavor is similar to, but stronger than the flavor of Genovese basil. The leaves are used in pesto or whole, in salads.
