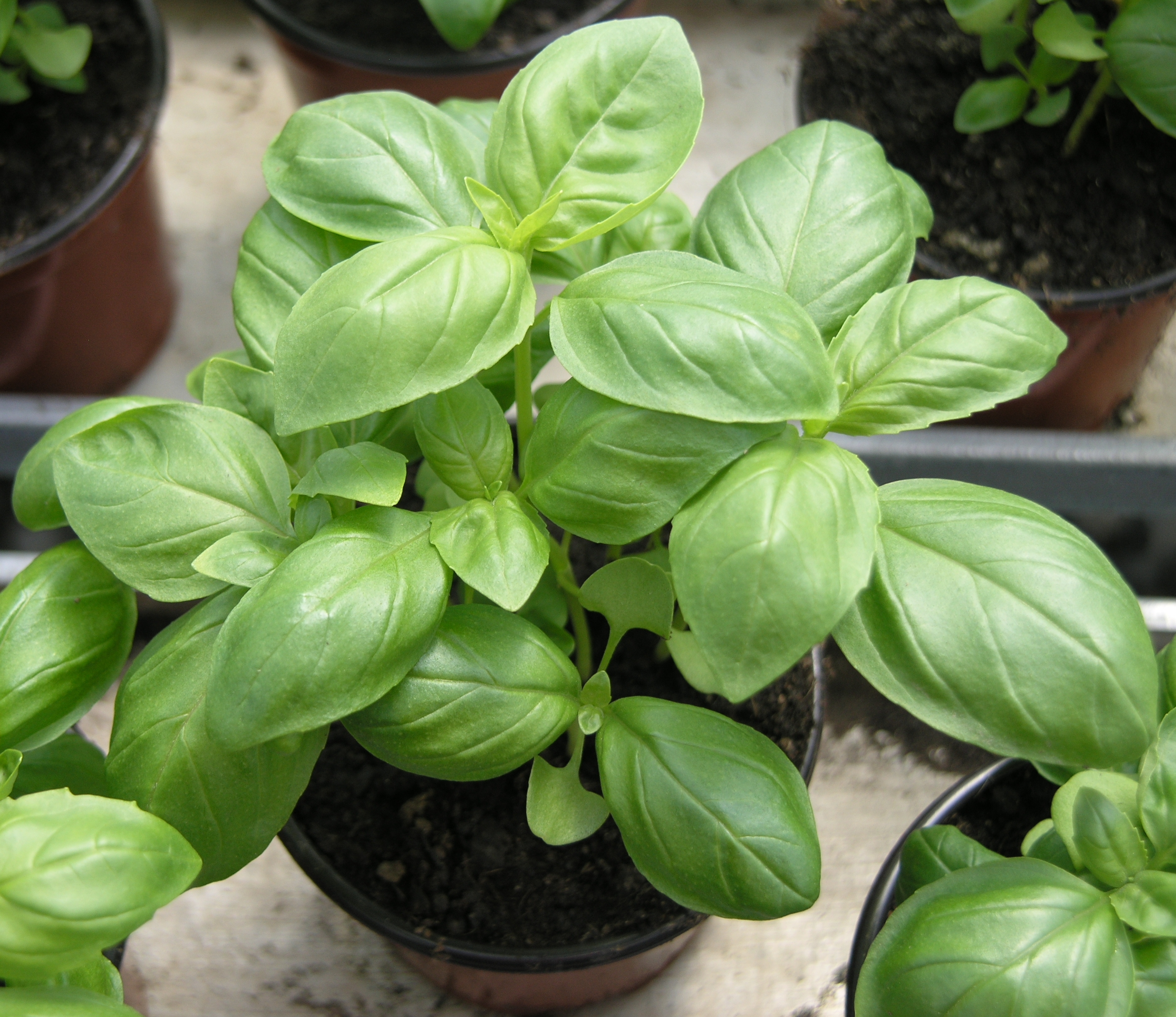
- Ocimum basilicum

Scientific classification
- Kingdom: Plantae
- Clade: Tracheophytes
- Clade: Angiosperms
- Clade: Eudicots
- Clade: Asterids
- Order: Lamiales
- Family: Lamiaceae
- Subfamily: Nepetoideae
- Tribe: Ocimeae
- Genus: Ocimum; L.

Synonyms
- Becium Lindl.; Erythrochlamys Gürke; Hyperaspis Briq.; Nautochilus Bremek.

= Ocimum =

Genus of flowering plants

Ocimum /ˈɒsɪməm/ is a genus of aromatic annual and perennial herbs and shrubs in the family Lamiaceae, native to the tropical and warm temperate regions of all 6 inhabited continents, with the greatest number of species in Africa. Its best known species are the cooking herb basil, O. basilicum, and the medicinal herb tulsi (holy basil), O. tenuiflorum.

== Ecology ==
Ocimum species are used as food plants by the larvae of some Lepidoptera species including Endoclita malabaricus.

== Taxonomy ==
The genus was first published by Carl Linnaeus in his book Species Plantarum on page 597 in 1753.

The genus name of Ocimum is derived from the Ancient Greek word for basil, ὤκιμον (ṓkimon).

=== Species ===
Accepted Ocimum species by Plants of the World Online, and World Flora Online;

- Ocimum albostellatum (Verdc.) A.J.Paton
- Ocimum americanum L. tropical Africa, Indian subcontinent, China, southeast Asia
- Ocimum amicorum A.J.Paton - Tanzania
- Ocimum angustifolium Benth. - southeastern Africa from Kenya to Tranasvaal
- Ocimum basilicum L. – (Basil, Sweet basil) - China, Indian subcontinent, southeast Asia
- Ocimum burchellianum Benth. - Cape Province of South Africa
- Ocimum campechianum Mill. – Amazonian basil - Florida, Mexico, West Indies, central and South America
- Ocimum canescens A.J.Paton - Tanzania
- Ocimum carnosum (Spreng.) Link & Otto ex Benth. - Mexico, South America
- Ocimum centraliafricanum R.E.Fr - Zaïre, Tanzania, Zambia, Zimbabwe
- Ocimum circinatum A.J.Paton - Ethiopia, Somalia
- Ocimum coddii (S.D.Williams & K.Balkwill) A.J.Paton - Northern Province of South Africa
- Ocimum cufodontii (Lanza) A.J.Paton - Ethiopia, Somalia, Kenya
- Ocimum dambicola A.J.Paton - Tanzania, Zambia
- Ocimum decumbens Gürke - from Zaïre to South Africa
- Ocimum dhofarense (Sebald) A.J.Paton - Oman
- Ocimum dolomiticola A.J.Paton - Northern Province of South Africa
- Ocimum ellenbeckii Gürke - Ethiopia, Zaïre
- Ocimum empetroides (P.A.Duvign.) ined. - Zaïre
- Ocimum ericoides (P.A.Duvign. & Plancke) A.J.Paton - Zaïre
- Ocimum filamentosum Forssk. - eastern + southern Africa, Arabian Peninsula, India, Sri Lanka, Myanmar
- Ocimum fimbriatum Briq. - central Africa
- Ocimum fischeri Gürke - Kenya, Tanzania
- Ocimum formosum Gürke - Ethiopia
- Ocimum forskolei Benth. - eastern Africa from Egypt to Kenya, Angola, Arabian Peninsula
- Ocimum fruticosum (Ryding) A.J.Paton - Somalia
- Ocimum grandiflorum Lam. - Kenya, Tanzania, Ethiopia
- Ocimum gratissimum L. – African basil - Africa, Madagascar, southern Asia, Bismarck Archipelago
- Ocimum hirsutissimum (P.A.Duvign.) A.J.Paton - Zaïre
- Ocimum irvinei J.K.Morton - west Africa
- Ocimum jamesii Sebald - Ethiopia, Somalia
- Ocimum kenyense Ayob. ex A.J.Paton - Kenya, Tanzania
- Ocimum kilimandscharicum Baker ex Gürke – (Camphor basil) - Kenya, Tanzania, Uganda, Sudan, Ethiopia
- Ocimum labiatum (N.E.Br.) A.J.Paton - Mozambique, South Africa,
- Ocimum lamiifolium Hochst. ex Benth - eastern + central Africa
- Ocimum masaiense Ayob. ex A.J.Paton - Ngong Hills in Kenya
- Ocimum mearnsii (Ayob. ex Sebald) A.J.Paton - Kenya, Tanzania, Uganda
- Ocimum metallorum (P.A.Duvign.) A.J.Paton - Zaïre
- Ocimum minutiflorum (Sebald) A.J.Paton - eastern + central Africa
- Ocimum mitwabense (Ayob.) A.J.Paton - Zaïre
- Ocimum monocotyloides (Plancke ex Ayob.) A.J.Paton - Zaïre
- Ocimum motjaneanum McCallum & K.Balkwill - Eswatini
- Ocimum natalense Ayob. ex A.J.Paton - Mozambique, KwaZulu-Natal
- Ocimum nudicaule Benth. - Brazil, Paraguay, Argentina
- Ocimum nummularia (S.Moore) A.J.Paton - Somalia
- Ocimum obovatum E.Mey. ex Benth. - tropical Africa, Madagascar
- Ocimum ovatum Benth. - Brazil, Paraguay, Uruguay, Argentina
- Ocimum pseudoserratum (M.R.Ashby) A.J.Paton - Northern Province of South Africa
- Ocimum pyramidatum (A.J.Paton) A.J.Paton - Tanzania
- Ocimum reclinatum (S.D.Williams & M.Balkwill) A.J.Paton - Mozambique, KwaZulu-Natal
- Ocimum sebrabergensis Swanepoel & van Jaarsv.
- Ocimum serpyllifolium Forssk. - Somalia, Yemen, Saudi Arabia
- Ocimum serratum (Schltr.) A.J.Paton - South Africa, Eswatini
- Ocimum spectabile (Gürke) A.J.Paton - Ethiopia, Tanzania, Kenya, Somalia
- Ocimum spicatum Deflers - Ethiopia, Yemen, Kenya, Somalia
- Ocimum tenuiflorum L. – Holy basil, tulsi - China, Indian subcontinent, southeast Asia, New Guinea, Queensland
- Ocimum transamazonicum C.Pereira - Brazil
- Ocimum tubiforme (R.D.Good) A.J.Paton - Northern Province of South Africa
- Ocimum urundense Robyns & Lebrun - Burundi, Tanzania
- Ocimum vandenbrandei (P.A.Duvign. & Plancke ex Ayob.) A.J.Paton - Zaïre
- Ocimum vanderystii (De Wild.) A.W.Hill. - Zaïre, Congo, Angola, Zambia
- Ocimum verticillifolium Baker
- Ocimum viphyense A.J.Paton - Malawi, Zambia
- Ocimum waterbergense (S.D.Williams & K.Balkwill) A.J.Paton - Northern Province of South Africa

=== Hybrids ===
- Ocimum × africanum Lour. - Africa, Madagascar, China, Indian subcontinent, Indochina; naturalized in Guatemala, Chiapas, Netherlands Antilles, eastern Brazil
- Ocimum × citriodorum (O. americanum × O. basilicum) – Lemon basil
- Ocimum kilimandscharicum × basilicum 'Dark Opal' – African blue basil

=== Formerly placed here ===
- Basilicum polystachyon (L.) Moench (as O. polystachyon L.)
- Isodon inflexus (Thunb.) Kudô (as O. inflexum Thunb.)
- Frankenia salina (Molina) I.M.Johnst. (as O. salinum Molina)
- Mosla scabra (Thunb.) C.Y.Wu & H.W.Li (as O. punctulatum J.F.Gmel. and O. scabrum Thunb.)
- Orthosiphon aristatus (Blume) Miq. (as O. aristatum Blume)
- Orthosiphon pallidus Royle ex Benth. (as O. somaliense Briq.)
- Perilla frutescens var. crispa (Thunb.) W.Deane (as O. crispum Thunb.)
- Perilla frutescens var. frutescens (as O. frutescens L.)
- Plectranthus scutellarioides (L.) R.Br. (as O. scutellarioides L.)

== Cultivation and uses ==
Most culinary and ornamental basils are cultivars of Ocimum basilicum and there are many hybrids between species. Thai basil (O. basilicum var. thyrsiflora) is a common ingredient in Thai cuisine, with a strong flavour similar to aniseed, used to flavour Thai curries and stir-fries. Lemon basil (Ocimum × citriodorum) is a hybrid between O. americanum and O. basilicum. It is noted for its lemon flavour and used in cooking.

Holy basil or tulsi (O. tenuiflorum) is a sacred herb revered as dear to Vishnu in some sects of Vaishnavism. Tulsi is used in teas, healing remedies, and cosmetics in India, and it is also used in Thai cooking. Amazonian basil (O. campechianum) is a South American species often utilized in ayahuasca rituals for its smell which is said to help avoid bad visions. O. centraliafricanum is valued as an indicator species for the presence of copper deposits.

== See also ==
- List of basil cultivars
