= Thai basil =

Basil widely used in Southeast Asia

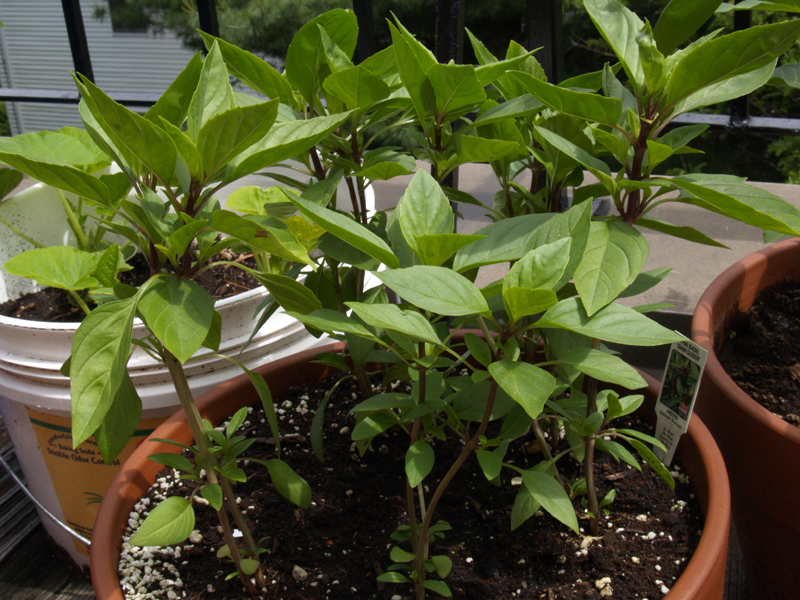
- Early-season Thai basil
- Species: Ocimum basilicum
- Variety: Ocimum basilicum var. thyrsiflora

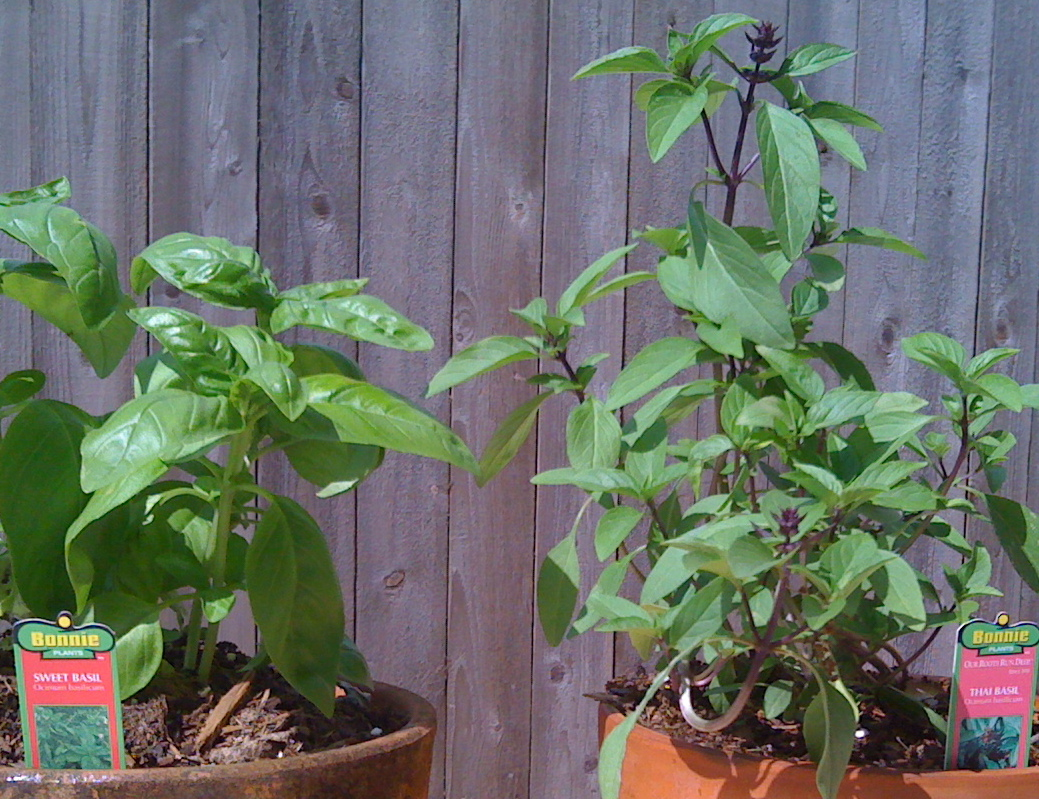
Sweet basil is light green with wide leaves while Thai basil has purple stems and flowers and spear-like leaves

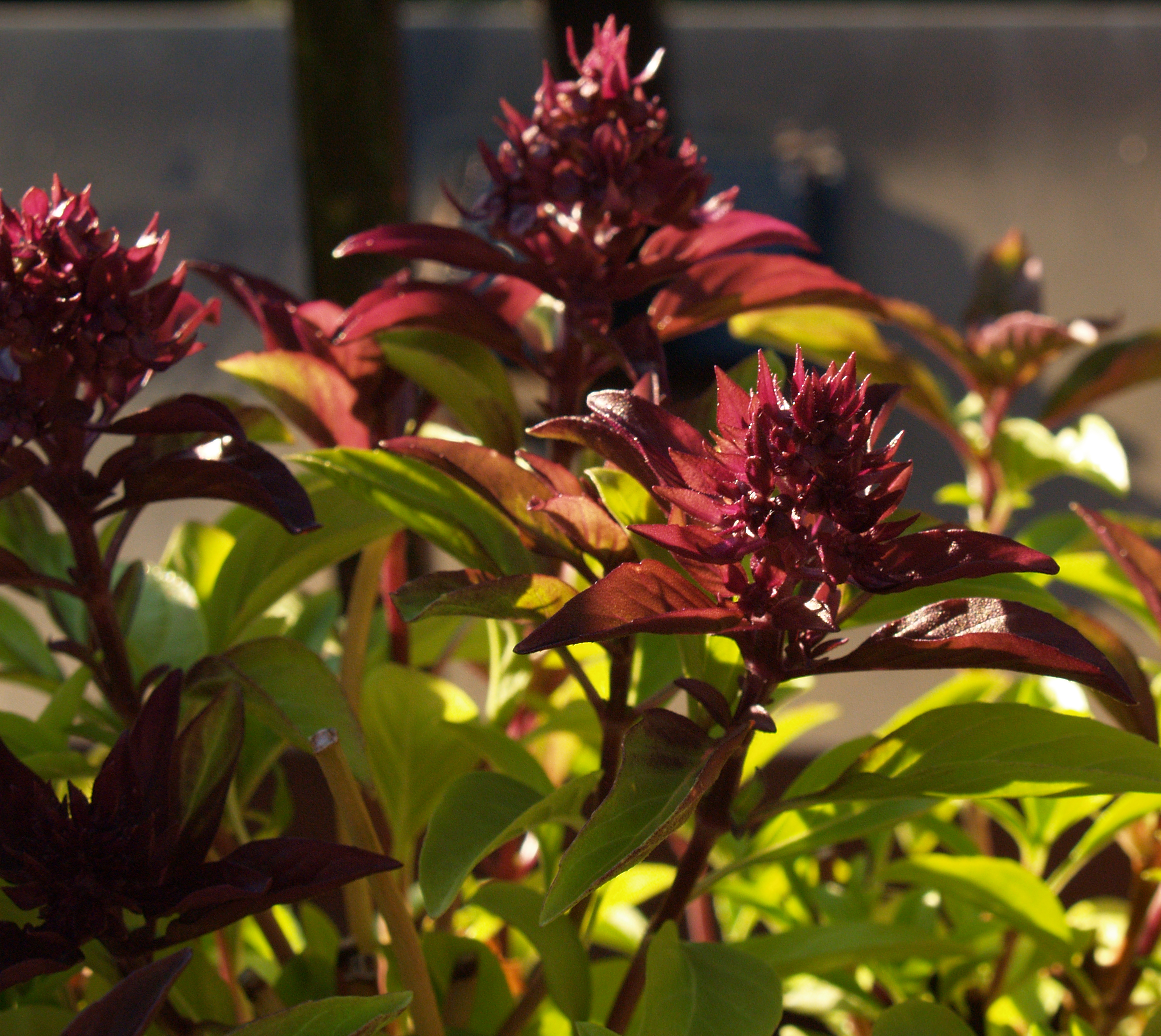
Late summer Thai basil flowers

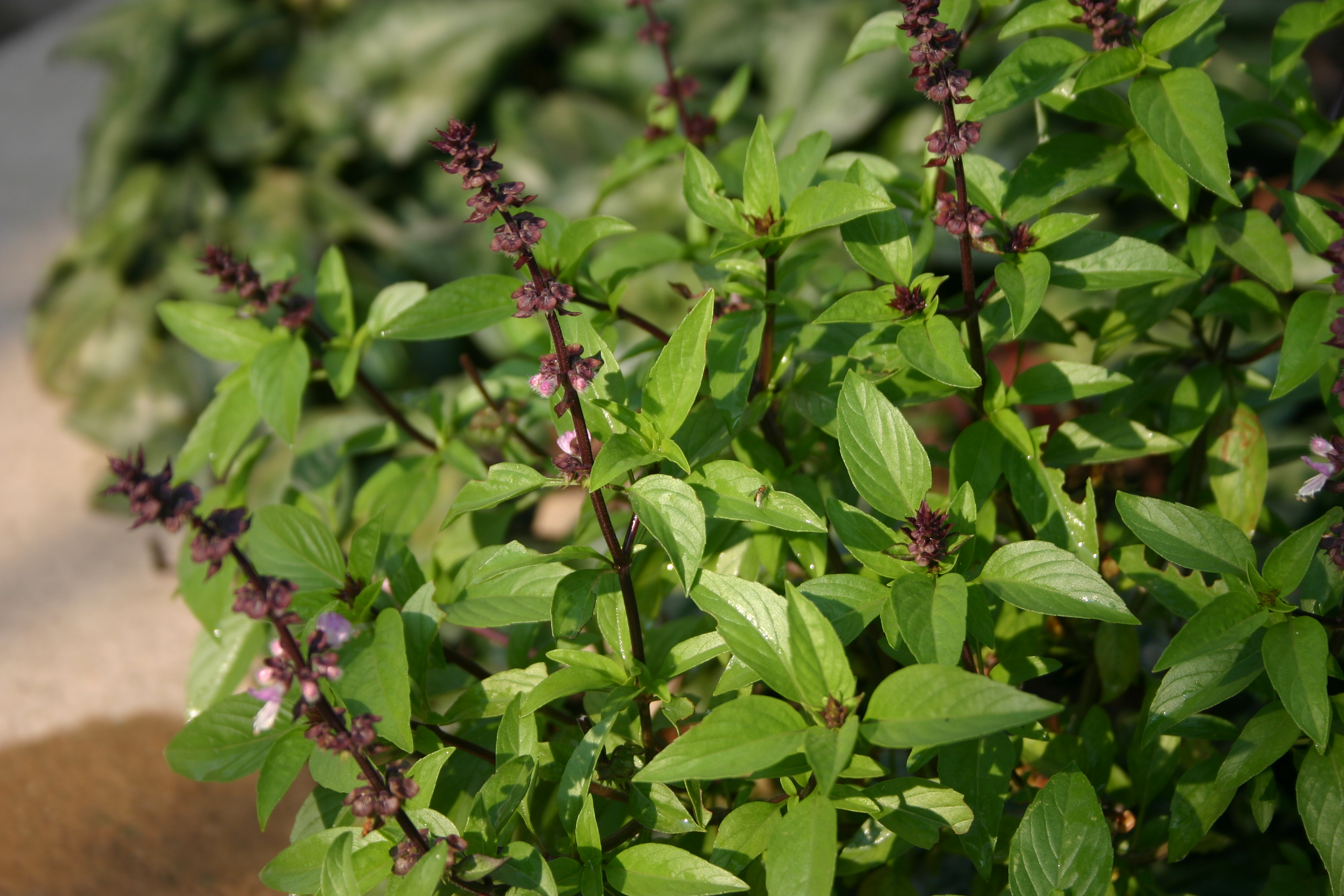
Midsummer Thai basil with flowers

Thai basil (Note: Thai: โหระพา, RTGS: horapha, ISO: hōraphā, pronounced [hǒː.rá(ʔ).pʰāː]; Khmer: ជីរនាងវង, chi neang vorng; Vietnamese: húng quế; in Taiwan: káu-chàn-thah, 九層塔) is a type of basil native to and widely used throughout Southeast Asia, that has been cultivated to provide distinctive traits. Its flavor is described as anise- and licorice-like and slightly spicy. It is more stable under high or extended cooking temperatures than sweet basil. Thai basil has small, narrow leaves, purple stems, and pink-purple flowers.

== Description ==
Thai basil is sturdy and compact, growing up to 45 cm (1 ft 6 in), and has shiny green, slightly serrated, narrow leaves with a sweet, anise-like scent and hints of licorice, along with a slight spiciness lacking in sweet basil. Thai basil has a purple stem, and like other plants in the mint family, the stem is square. Its leaves are opposite and decussate. As implied by its scientific name, Thai basil flowers in the form of a thyrse. The inflorescence is purple, and the flowers when open are pink.

== Taxonomy and nomenclature ==
Sweet basil (Ocimum basilicum) has multiple cultivars — Thai basil, O. basilicum var. thyrsiflora, is one variety. Thai basil may sometimes be called chi neang vorng, anise basil or licorice basil, in reference to its anise- and licorice-like scent and taste, but it is different from the Western strains bearing these same names.

Occasionally, Thai basil may be called cinnamon basil, which is its literal name in Vietnamese, but cinnamon basil typically refers to a separate cultivar.

The genus name Ocimum is derived from the Greek word meaning "to smell", which is appropriate for most members of the family Lamiaceae. With over 40 cultivars of basil, this abundance of flavors, aromas, and colors leads to confusion when identifying specific cultivars.

Three types of basil are commonly used in Thai cuisine.

- Thai basil, or horapha (Thai: โหระพา), is widely used throughout Southeast Asia and plays a prominent role in Vietnamese cuisine. It is the cultivar most often used for Asian cooking in Western kitchens.
- Holy basil (O. tenuiflorum), mreah-pruv (Khmer: ម្រះព្រៅ), or kaphrao (Thai: กะเพรา), which has a spicy, peppery, clove-like taste, may be the basil Thai people love most. It is also known as Thai holy basil or by its Indian name, tulasi or tulsi; It is widely used in India for culinary, medicinal, and religious purposes.
- Lemon basil (O. × citriodorum), or maenglak (Thai: แมงลัก), as its name implies, has undertones of lemon in scent and taste. Lemon basil is the least commonly used type of basil in Thailand. It is also known as Thai lemon basil, in contradistinction to Mrs. Burns' Lemon basil, another cultivar.

In Taiwan, Thai basil is called káu-chàn-thah (Chinese: 九層塔; pinyin: jiǔcéngtǎ; Wade–Giles: chiu ts'eng t'a; Pe̍h-ōe-jī: káu-chàn-thah), which literally means "nine-storey pagoda".

== Uses ==
=== Culinary ===
Thai basil is widely used in the cuisines of Southeast Asia, including Thai, Vietnamese, Lao, and Cambodian cuisines. Thai basil leaves are a frequent ingredient in Thai green and red curries, though in Thailand the basil used in drunken noodles and many chicken, pork, and seafood dishes is holy basil. In the West, however, such dishes typically contain Thai basil instead, which is much more readily available than holy basil. Thai basil is also an important ingredient in the very popular Taiwanese dish sanbeiji (three-cup chicken). Used as a condiment, a plate of raw Thai basil leaves is often served as an accompaniment to many Vietnamese dishes, such as phở (Southern style), bún bò Huế, or bánh xèo, so that each person can season to taste with the anise-flavored leaves.

== Cultivation ==
Thai basil is a tender perennial but is typically grown as an annual. As a tropical plant, Thai basil is hardy only in very warm climates where there is no chance of frost. It is generally hardy to USDA plant hardiness zone 10. Thai basil, which can be grown from seed or cuttings, requires fertile, well-draining soil with a pH ranging from 6.5 to 7.5 and 6 to 8 hours of full sunlight per day. The flowers should be pinched to prevent the leaves from becoming bitter. Thai basil can be repeatedly harvested by taking a few leaves at a time and should be harvested periodically to encourage regrowth.

== See also ==
- Basil
- List of basil cultivars
- List of Thai ingredients
