= Cinnamon basil =

Variety of basil

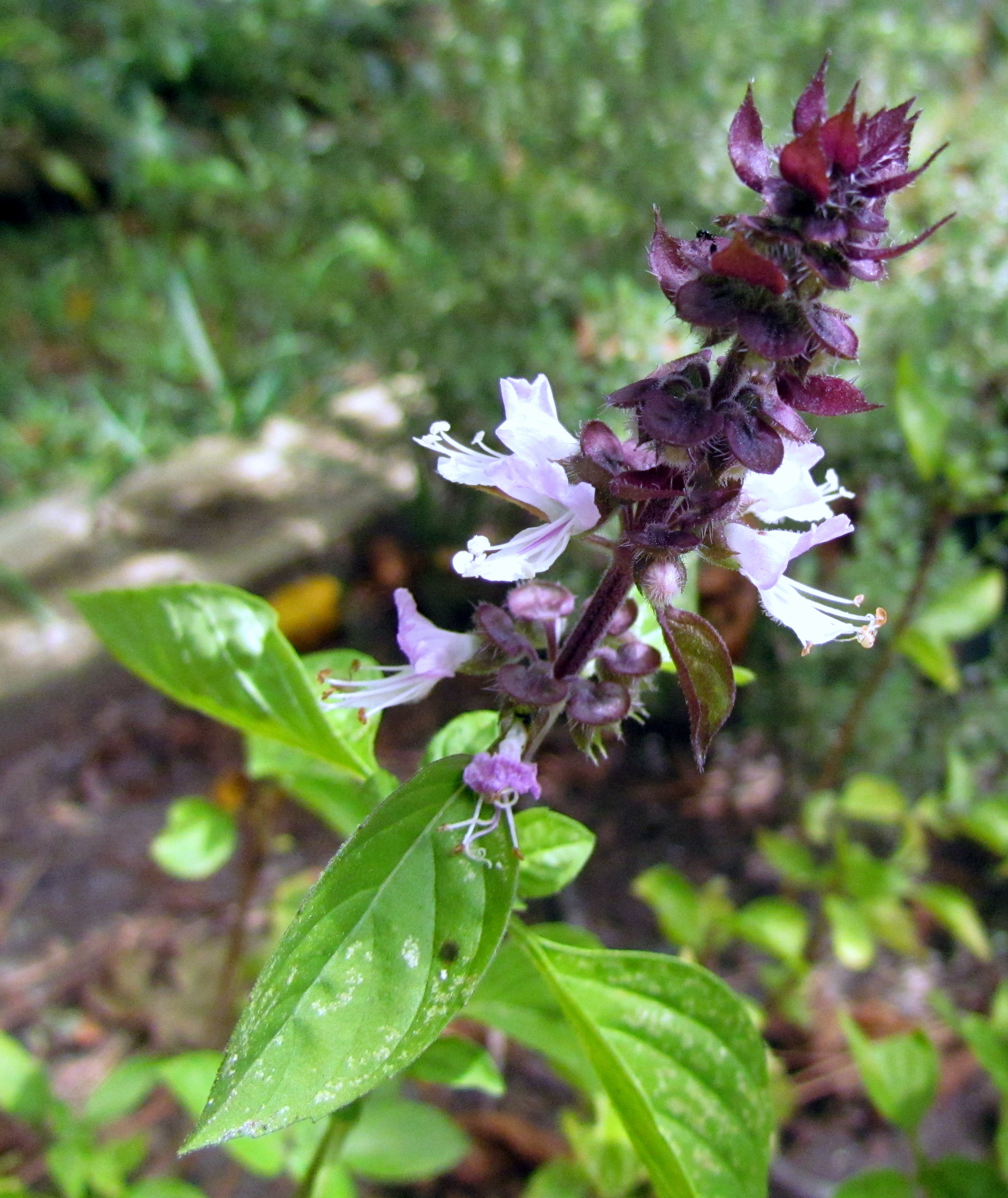
- Flowering cinnamon basil in late summer
- Species: Ocimum basilicum
- Cultivar: 'Cinnamon'

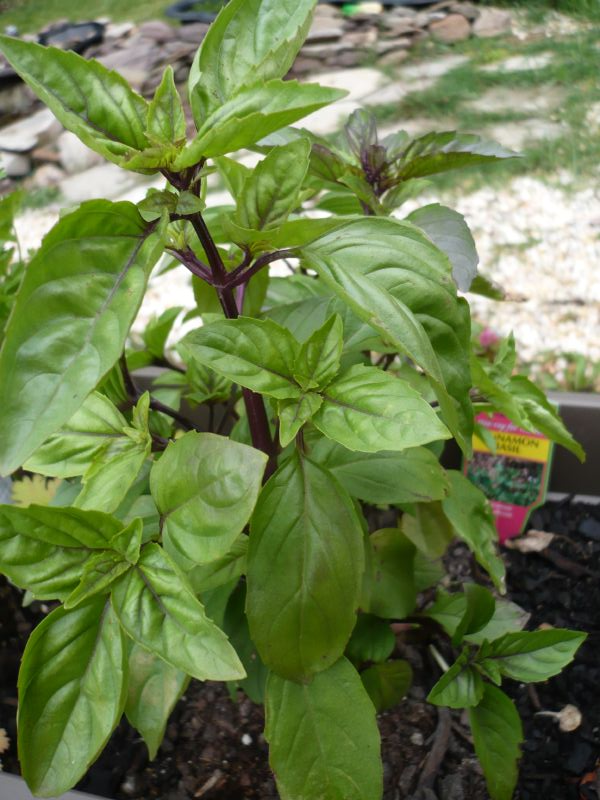
Young cinnamon basil in late spring

Cinnamon basil is a type of basil (Ocimum basilicum). The term "cinnamon basil" can refer to a number of different varieties of basil, including as a synonym for Thai basil (O. basilicum var. thyrsiflora), as a particular cultivar of Thai basil, and as a separate cultivar in its own right (i.e., O. basilicum 'Cinnamon'). This article discusses the latter type.

== Description ==
Cinnamon basil, also known as Mexican spice basil, has a spicy, fragrant aroma and flavor. It contains methyl cinnamate, giving it a flavor reminiscent of cinnamon. Cinnamon basil has somewhat narrow, slightly serrated, dark green, shiny leaves with reddish-purple veins, which can resemble certain types of mint, and produces small, pink flowers from July to September. Its stems are dark purple. Cinnamon basil grows to 18–30 inches tall.

== Cultivation ==
Cinnamon basil is an easy-to-grow herb. It requires six to eight hours of bright sunlight per day. Although it is often grown as an annual, it is a perennial in USDA plant hardiness zones 9–11. Cinnamon basil is sometimes planted near tomatoes and roses to discourage pests such as whiteflies.

== Uses ==
Cinnamon basil is used in teas and baked goods such as cookies and pies. It is also used in pastas, salads, jellies, and vinegars. Outside the kitchen, cinnamon basil is used in dried arrangements and as a potpourri.

== Space ==
Cinnamon basil was taken into space by the Space Shuttle Endeavour during STS-118 and grown in an experiment in low Earth orbit on the International Space Station.
