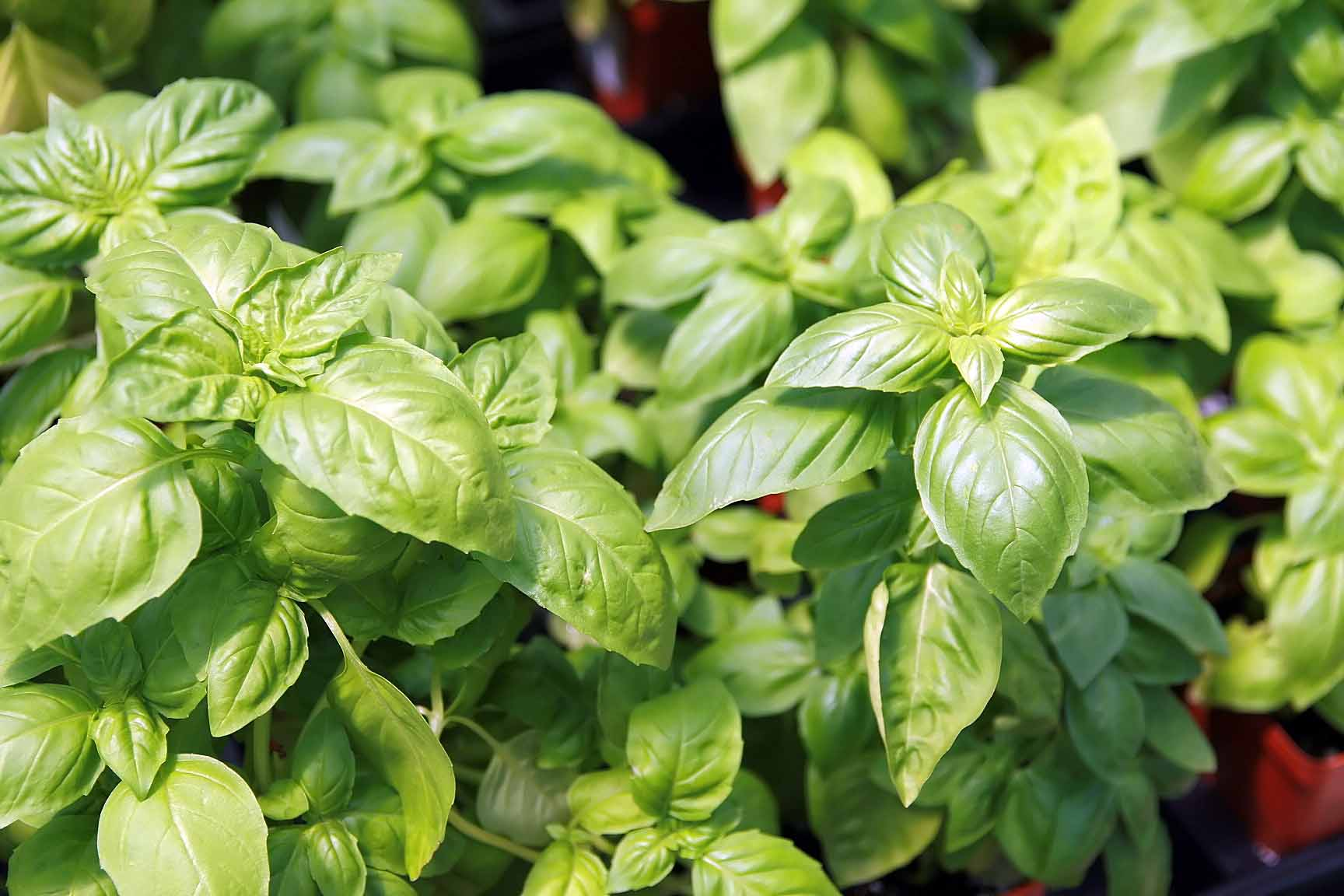

Scientific classification
- Kingdom: Plantae
- Clade: Tracheophytes
- Clade: Angiosperms
- Clade: Eudicots
- Clade: Asterids
- Order: Lamiales
- Family: Lamiaceae
- Genus: Ocimum
- Species: O. basilicum

Binomial name
- Ocimum basilicum L.

= Basil =

Culinary herb

Basil (Note: /ˈbæzəl/, BAZ-əl; US also /ˈbeɪzəl/, BAY-zəl;) (Ocimum basilicum), also called great basil, is a culinary herb of the family Lamiaceae (mints). It is a tender plant and is used in cuisines worldwide. In Western cuisine, the generic term "basil" refers to the variety also known as Genovese basil or sweet basil. Basil is native to tropical and subtopical Asia and Australasia from India and Sri Lanka east to southeastern China, Taiwan, and south through Southeast Asia, the Philippines, New Guinea, to northern Australia. In temperate climates basil is treated as an annual plant, but it can be grown as a short-lived perennial or biennial in warmer horticultural zones with tropical or Mediterranean climates.

There are many cultivars of basil including sweet basil, Thai basil (O. basilicum 'Thyrsiflora'), and Mrs. Burns' Lemon (O. basilicum 'Citriodorum'). Ocimum basilicum can cross-pollinate with other species in the genus Ocimum, producing hybrids such as lemon basil (O. × africanum) and African blue basil (O. × kilimandscharicum).

== Description ==
Timelapse of growing basil

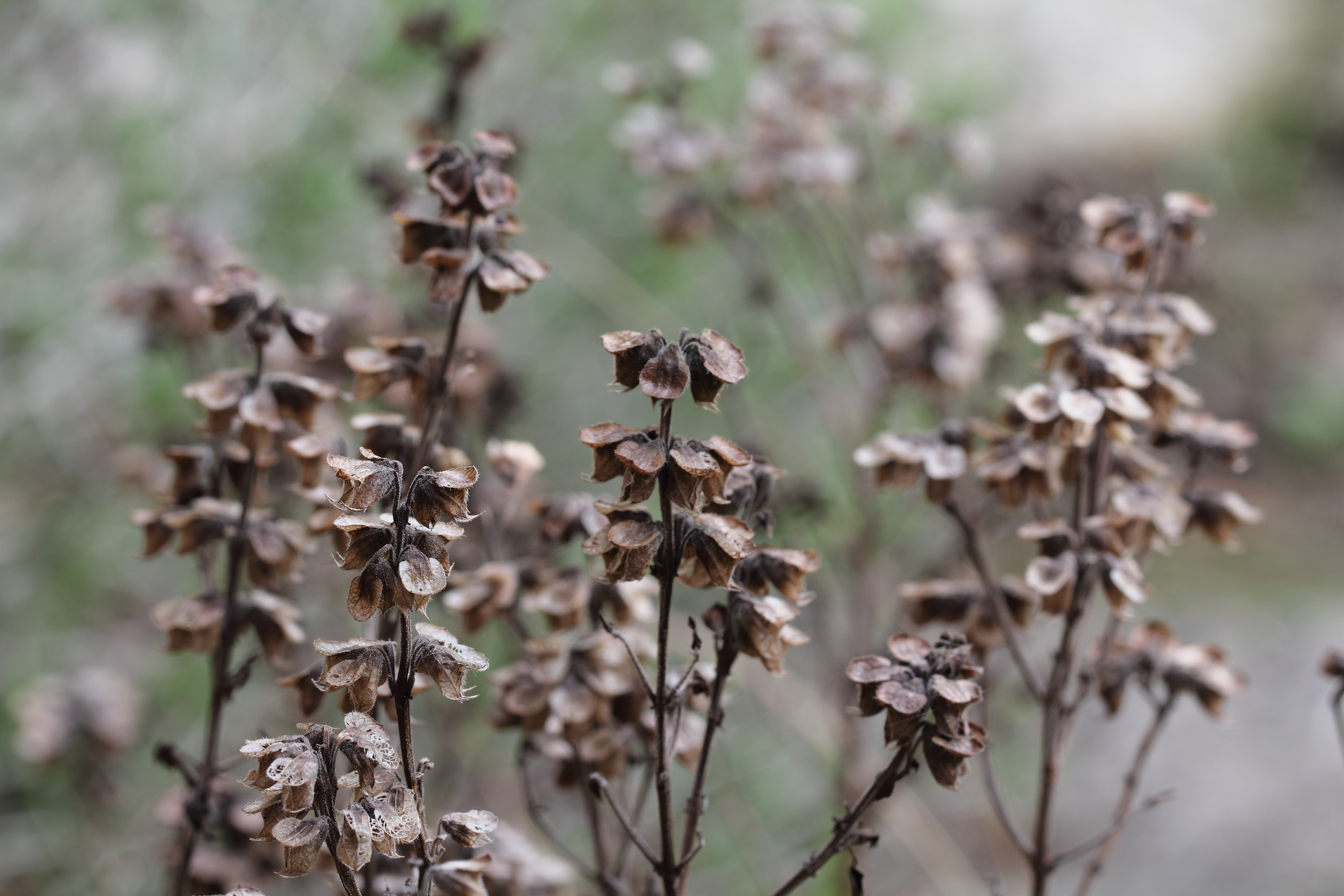
Desiccated basil showing seed dispersal

Basil is an annual, or sometimes perennial, herb. Depending on the variety, plants can reach heights of between 30 and 150 centimetres (1 and 5 feet). Basil leaves are glossy and ovate, with smooth or slightly toothed edges that typically cup slightly; the leaves are arranged in opposite pairs along the square stems. The leaves are usually green, but can be purple in some cultivars such as 'Purple Ruffles'. Its flowers are small and white, and grow from a central inflorescence, or spike, that emerges from the central stem atop the plant. Unusual among Lamiaceae, the four stamens and the pistil are not pushed under the upper lip of the corolla, but lie over the inferior lip. After entomophilous pollination, the corolla falls off and four round achenes develop inside the bilabiate calyx.

=== Phytochemistry ===
The various basils have such distinct scents because the volatile aromatic compounds vary with cultivars. The essential oil from European basil contains high concentrations of linalool and methyl chavicol (estragole), in a ratio of about 3:1. Other constituents include: 1,8-cineole, eugenol, and myrcene, among others. The clove scent of sweet basil is derived from eugenol. The aroma profile of basil includes 1,8-cineole and methyl eugenol. In this species eugenol is synthesised from coniferyl acetate and NADPH.

=== Similar species ===
Some similar species in the same genus may be commonly called "basil", although they are not varieties of Ocimum basilicum.

- Camphor basil, African basil (O. kilimandscharicum)
- Clove basil, also African basil (Ocimum gratissimum)
- Holy basil (Ocimum tenuiflorum, formerly known as O. sanctum)

== Taxonomy ==
Two botanical varieties are accepted by the Plants of the World Online database:

- Ocimum basilicum var. basilicum — throughout the range of the species
- Ocimum basilicum var. minimum (L.) Alef. — native to India and Sri Lanka only

The exact taxonomy of basil is uncertain due to the immense number of cultivars, its ready polymorphy, and frequent cross-pollination (resulting in new hybrids) with other members of the genus Ocimum and within the species. Ocimum basilicum has at least 60 varieties, which further complicates taxonomy.

=== Cultivars ===
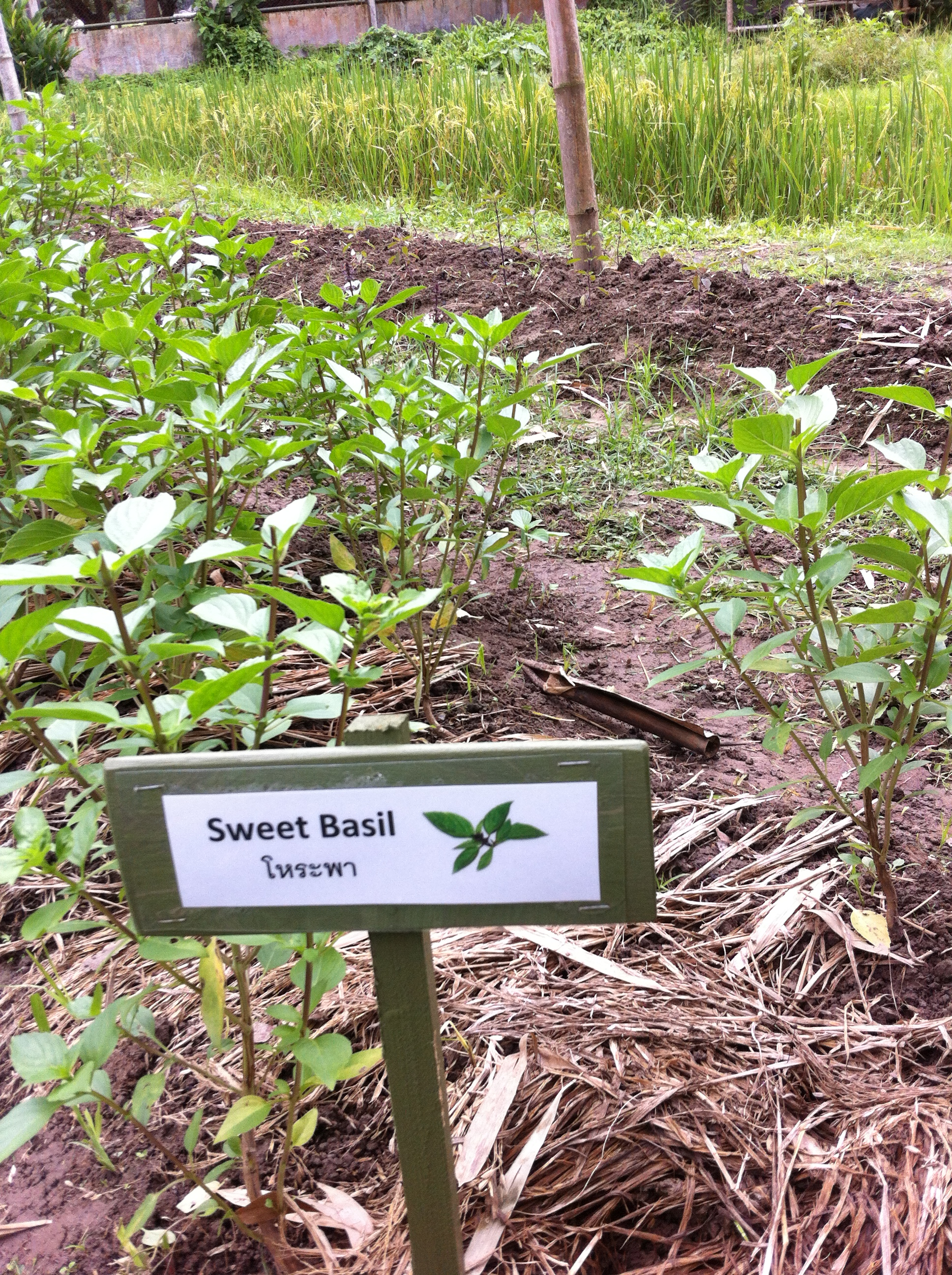
Thai basil growing at a school in Thailand

Most basils are cultivars of sweet basil. Most basil varieties have green leaves, but a few are purple, such as, 'Purple Delight'.

- Anise basil, Licorice basil, or Persian basil (O. basilicum 'Liquorice')
- Cinnamon basil (Ocimum basilicum 'Cinnamon')
- Dark opal basil (Ocimum basilicum 'Dark Opal')
- Genovese basil or Sweet Basil (Ocimum basilicum)
- Greek basil (Ocimum basilicum var. minimum)
- Globe basil, dwarf basil, French basil (Ocimum basilicum 'Minimum')
- Lettuce leaf basil (Ocimum basilicum 'Crispum')
- Napolitano basil, also known as Napoletano basil, Neapolitan basil, Mammoth basil, Bolloso Napoletano basil, Napolitano Mammoth-Leafed basil, or Italian Large-Leaf basil (Ocimum basilicum)
- Purple basil (Ocimum basilicum 'Purpurescens')
- Rubin basil (Ocimum basilicum 'Rubin')
- Thai basil (Ocimum basilicum var. thyrsifolium)

=== Hybrids ===
- African blue basil (Ocimum basilicum × O. kilimandscharicum)
- Lemon basil (Ocimum basilicum × O. americanum)
- Spice basil (Ocimum basilicum × O. americanum), which is sometimes sold as holy basil

=== Etymology ===
The name "basil" comes from the Latin basilius, and the Greek βασιλικόν φυτόν (basilikón phytón), meaning "royal/kingly plant", possibly because the plant was believed to have been used in production of royal perfumes. Basil is likewise sometimes referred to in French as "l'herbe royale" ('the royal herb'). The Latin name has been confused with basilisk, as it was supposed to be an antidote to the basilisk's venom.

== Distribution and habitat ==
Basil is native to India and other tropical and subtropical regions stretching across Southeast Asia to northern Australia, but has now become globalised due to human cultivation.

== Cultivation ==
=== Growing conditions ===
Basil is sensitive to cold, with best growth in hot, dry conditions. Basil prefers high light conditions and grows best under full sun conditions. Increasing light intensity, particularly the photosynthetic photon flux density, can significantly enhance the plant's fresh weight, dry matter content, and height.

However, due to its common use, basil is cultivated in many countries around the world. Production areas include countries in the Mediterranean area, those in the temperate zone, and others in subtropical climates.

In northern Europe, Canada, the northern states of the U.S., and the South Island of New Zealand, basil grows best if sown under glass in compost in a pot, then planted out in late spring/early summer (when there is little chance of a frost); however, it can also thrive when planted outside in these climates. Additionally, it may be sown in soil once chance of frost is past. It fares best in well-drained soil with direct exposure to the sun.

Although basil grows best outdoors, it can be grown indoors in a pot and, like most herbs, will do best on a sun-facing windowsill, kept away from cold drafts. A greenhouse or row cover is ideal if available. It can, however, even be grown in a basement under fluorescent lights. Supplemental lighting produces greater biomass and phenol production, with red + blue specifically increasing growth and flower bud production. UV-B increases the volatiles in O. basilicum essential oil, which has not been reproducible in other plants, and so may be unique to the genus or even to this species.

Basil prefers well-drained organic soils, as adequate oxygen availability in the root zone is essential for optimal plant growth. Poor soil drainage can lead to root hypoxia, which negatively affects overall plant development and essential oil yield.

=== Pruning, flowering, and seeding ===
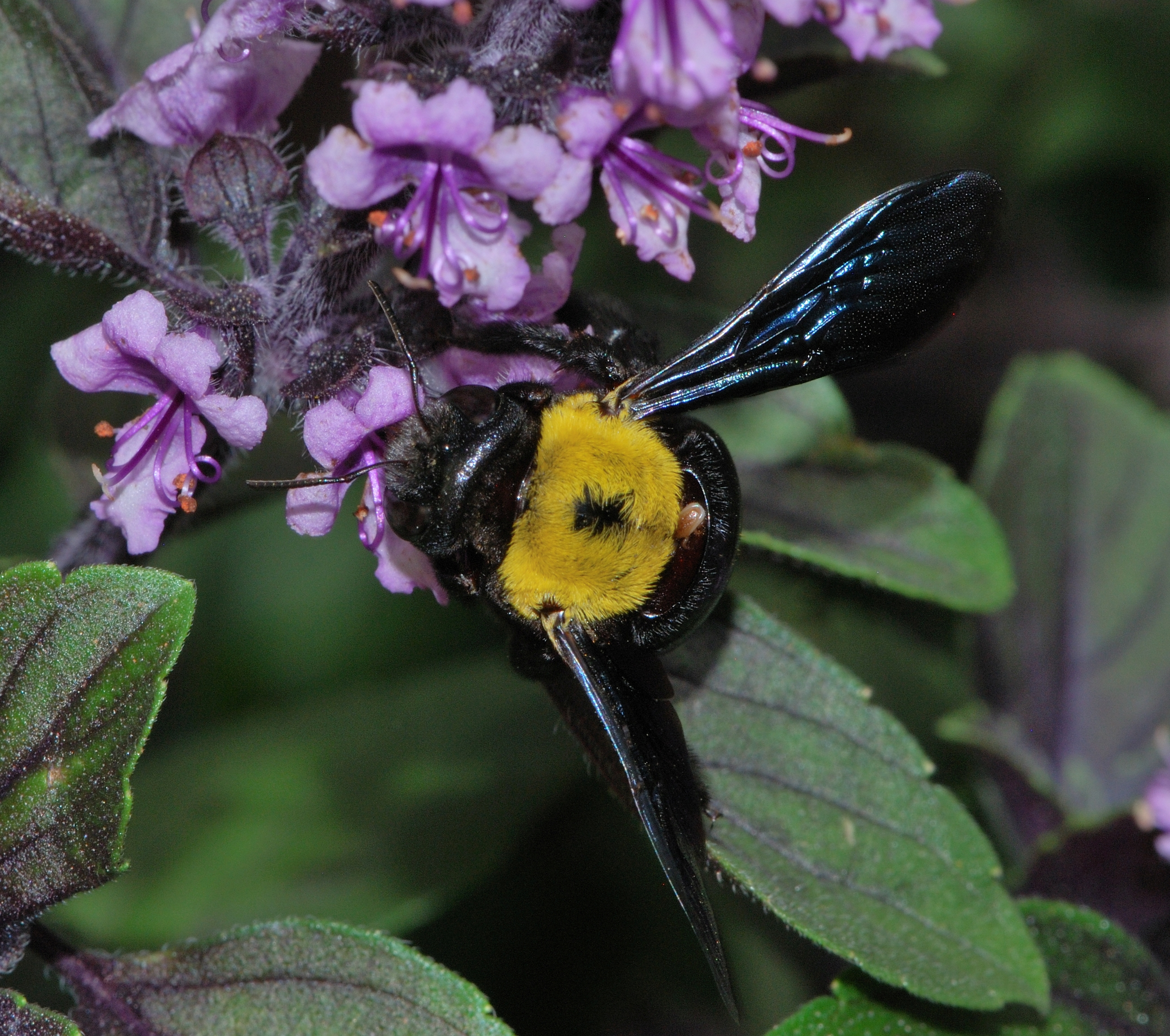
Female carpenter bee foraging

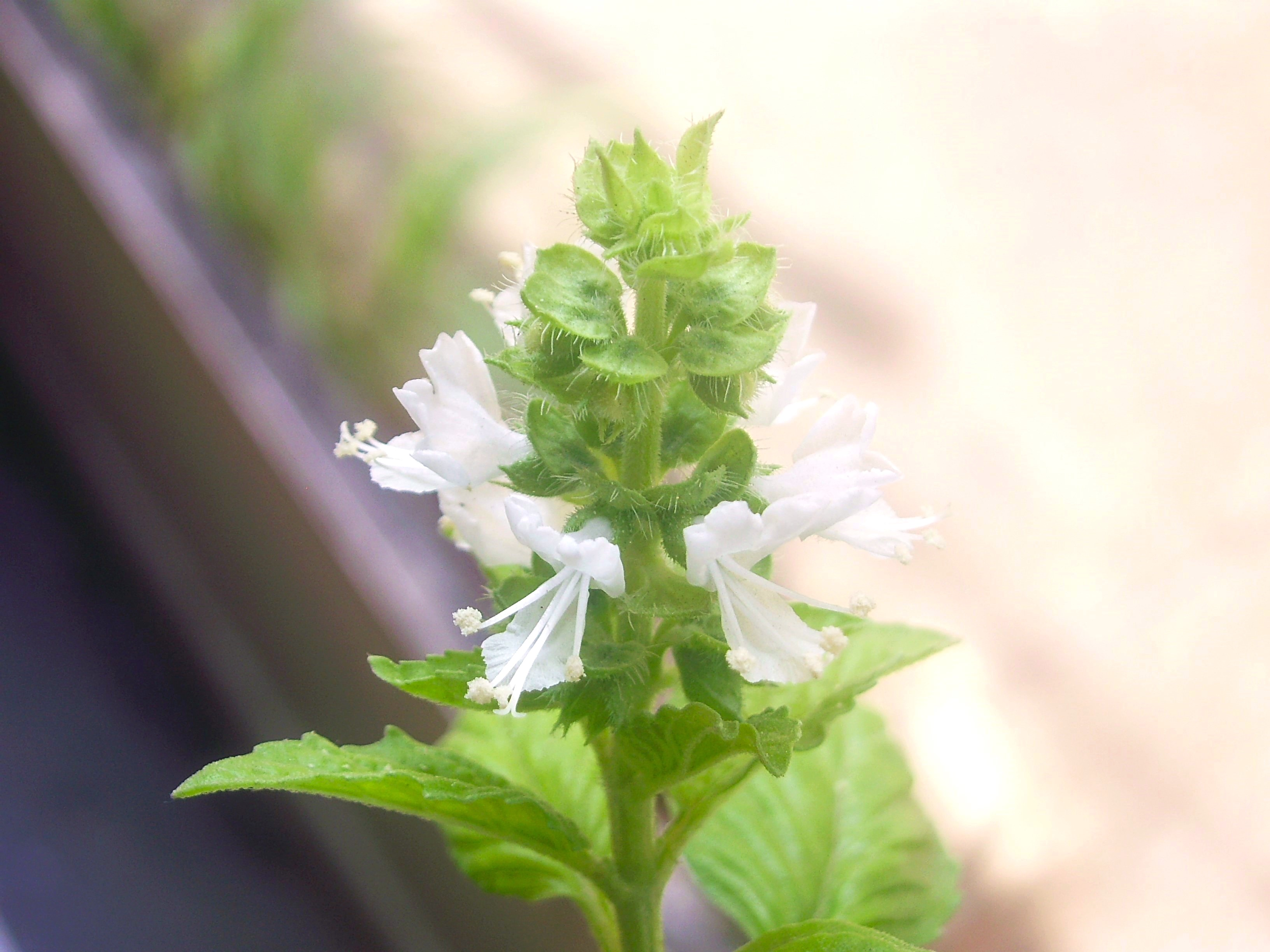
Flowers of Italian Basil

Once a stem produces flowers, foliage production stops on that stem, the stem becomes woody, and essential oil production declines. To prevent this, a basil-grower may pinch off any flower stems before they are fully mature. Because only the blooming stem is so affected, some stems can be pinched for leaf production, while others are left to bloom for decoration or seeds. Picking the leaves off the plant helps promote growth, largely because the plant responds by converting pairs of leaflets next to the topmost leaves into new stems.

Once the plant is allowed to flower, it may produce seed pods containing small black seeds, which can be saved and planted the following year. If allowed to go to seed, a basil plant will grow back the next year.

=== Propagation methods ===
==== Seeds ====
The optimal germination temperature for basil seeds ranges between 34.5–39.0°C, while the minimum germination temperature lies between 9.8–13.2°C. No significant variation in optimal germination temperature has been observed among different basil cultivars. Prior to sowing, basil (Ocimum basilicum) seeds can be hydroprimed by soaking in water for 12 hours, which effectively enhances germination rates and seedling vigour.

==== Cuttings ====
Basil (Ocimum basilicum L.) is commonly propagated through cuttings. Compared to seed propagation, basil cuttings tend to result in earlier harvest and higher yield. The typical propagation method involves selecting healthy, non-lignified stem segments approximately 5–10 cm in length, preferably apical shoots that retain 2 to 5 leaves, which are then inserted into moist soil until root development occurs. After rooting, the plantlets are transplanted into the field. Exposing basil cuttings to blue light significantly accelerates root formation, thereby shortening the growth period.

=== Diseases ===
Basil suffers from several plant pathogens that can ruin the crop and reduce yield. Fusarium wilt is a soil-borne fungal disease that can kill younger basil plants quickly. Seedlings may be killed by Pythium damping off. A common foliar disease of basil is grey mould caused by Botrytis cinerea; it can cause infections post-harvest and is capable of killing the entire plant. Black spot can be seen on basil foliage and is caused by the fungi genus Colletotrichum. Downy mildew caused by Peronospora belbahrii is a significant disease, as first reported in Italy in 2003. It was reported in the Florida in 2007 and by 2008 had spread along the eastern United States, reaching Canada. Basil cultivars resistant to P. belbahrii have been developed.

Non-pathogenic bacteria found on basil include Novosphingobium species.

== Uses ==
Basil, fresh
Nutritional value per 100 g (3.5 oz)
- Energy: 94 kJ (22 kcal)
- Carbohydrates: 2.65 g
- Sugars: 0.30 g
- Dietary fibre: 1.6 g
- Fat: 0.64 g
- Protein: 3.15 g
Vitamins and minerals
Vitamins	Quantity %DV^{†}
Vitamin A equiv. beta-Carotene	29% 264 μg 29% 3142 μg
Thiamine (B1)	3% 0.034 mg
Riboflavin (B2)	6% 0.076 mg
Niacin (B3)	6% 0.902 mg
Pantothenic acid (B5)	4% 0.209 mg
Vitamin B6	9% 0.155 mg
Folate (B9)	17% 68 μg
Choline	2% 11.4 mg
Vitamin C	20% 18.0 mg
Vitamin E	5% 0.80 mg
Vitamin K	346% 414.8 μg
Minerals	Quantity %DV^{†}
Calcium	14% 177 mg
Copper	43% 0.385 mg
Iron	18% 3.17 mg
Magnesium	15% 64 mg
Manganese	50% 1.148 mg
Phosphorus	4% 56 mg
Potassium	10% 295 mg
Selenium	1% 0.3 μg
Sodium	0% 4 mg
Zinc	7% 0.81 mg
- Other constituents: Quantity
- Water: 92.06 g
- Betaine: 0.4 mg
- ^{†}Percentages estimated using US recommendations for adults, except for potassium, which is estimated based on expert recommendation from the National Academies.

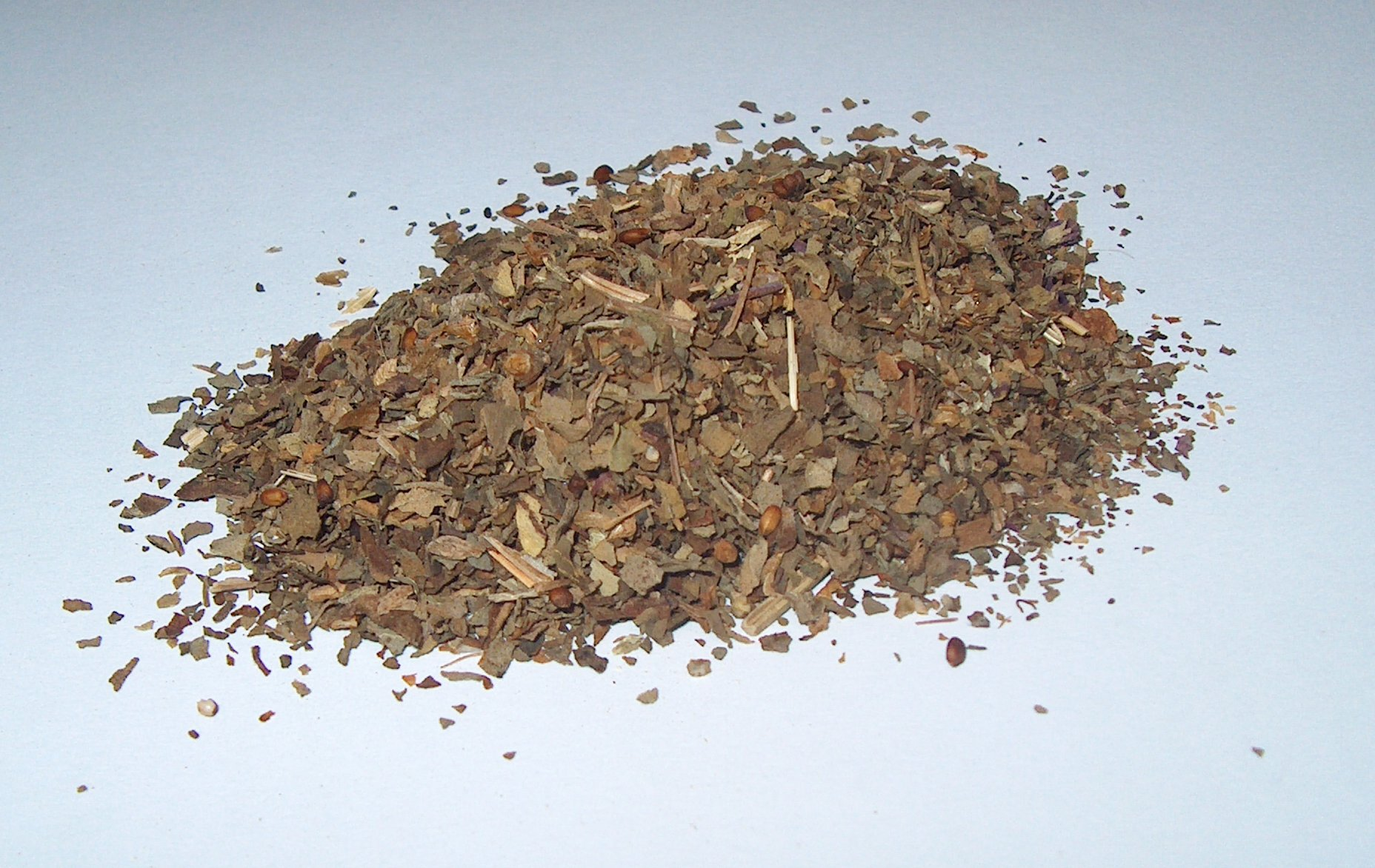
Dried basil leaves

=== Culinary ===
Basil is most commonly used fresh in recipes. In general, it is added last, as cooking quickly destroys the flavour. The fresh herb can be kept for a short time in plastic bags in the refrigerator, or for a longer period in the freezer, after being blanched quickly in boiling water. It has a flavour resembling that of liquorice.

==== Leaves and flowers ====
The most commonly used Mediterranean basil cultivars are "Genovese", "Purple Ruffles", "Mammoth", "Cinnamon", "Lemon", "Globe", and "African Blue". Basil is one of the main ingredients in pesto, an Italian sauce with olive oil and basil as its primary ingredients, and is used in other sauces and salad dressings. Many national cuisines use fresh or dried basils in soups and other foods, such as to thicken soups. Basil is commonly steeped in cream or milk to create flavour in ice cream or chocolate truffles. It is sometimes used to infuse oils and vinegars.

Lemon basil has a strong lemony smell and flavour due to the presence of citral. It is widely used in Indonesia, where it is called kemangi and served raw as an accompaniment to meat or fish.

==== Seeds ====
When soaked in water, the seeds of several basil varieties become gelatinous, and are used in Asian drinks and desserts such as the Indian faluda, the Iranian sharbat-e-rihan, or hột é. In Kashmir, the Ramadan fast is often broken with babre beole, a sharbat made with basil seeds.

=== Folk medicine ===
Basil is used in folk medicine practices, such as those of Ayurveda or traditional Chinese medicine.

=== Insecticide and insect repellent ===
Studies of the essential oil have shown insecticidal and insect-repelling properties, including potential toxicity to mosquitos. The essential oil is found by Huignard et al. 2008 to inhibit electrical activity by decreasing action potential amplitude, by shortening the post hyperpolarisation phase, and reducing the action frequency of action potentials. In Huignard's opinion this is due to the linalool and estragole, the amplitude reduction due to linalool, and the phase shortening due to both.

Callosobruchus maculatus, a pest which affects cowpea, is repelled by the essential oil. The essential oil mixed with kaolin is both an adulticide and an ovicide, effective for three months against C. maculatus in cowpea. The thrips Frankliniella occidentalis and Thrips tabaci are repelled by O. basilicum, making this useful as an insect repellent in other crops. The pests Sitophilus oryzae, Stegobium paniceum, Tribolium castaneum, and Bruchus chinensis are evaluated by Deshpande et al. 1974 and '77.

=== Nematicide ===
The essential oil is found by Malik et al. 1987 and Sangwan et al. 1990 to be nematicidal against Tylenchulus semipenetrans, Meloidogyne javanica, Anguina tritici, and Heterodera cajani.

=== Bacterial and fungal inhibition ===
The essential oil of the leaf and terminal shoot is effective against a large number of bacterial species including Lactiplantibacillus plantarum and Pseudomonas spp. The essential oil of the leaf and terminal shoot is also effective against a large number of fungal species including Aspergillus spp., Candida spp., Mucor spp., and Geotrichum candidum.

== In culture ==
=== Religion ===
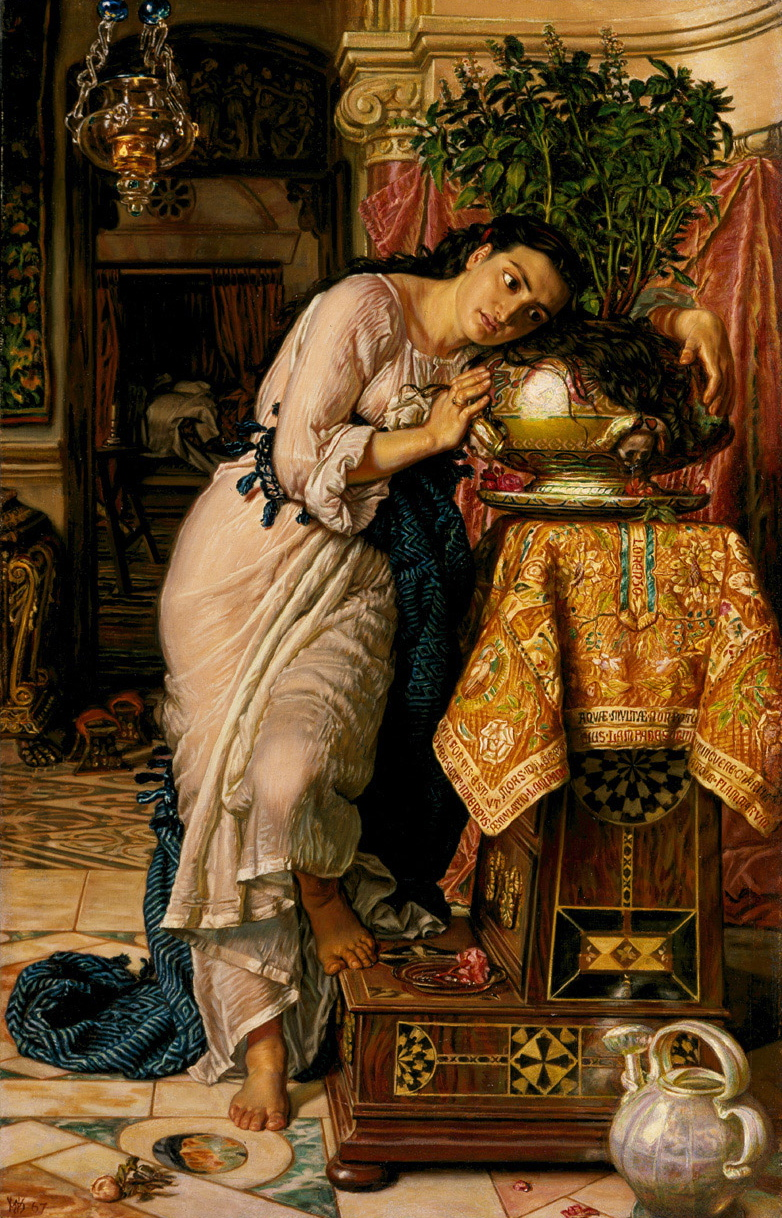
Isabella and the Pot of Basil, William Holman Hunt, 1868

There are many rituals and beliefs associated with basil. The ancient Egyptians and ancient Greeks believed basil would open the gates of heaven for a person passing on. However, Herbalist Nicholas Culpeper saw basil as a plant of dread and suspicion, citing warnings against consumption by authors such as Galen and Chrysippus.

In Portugal, dwarf bush basil is traditionally presented in a pot, together with a poem and a paper carnation, to a sweetheart, on the religious holidays of John the Baptist (see Saint John's Eve § Portugal) and Saint Anthony of Padua.

Basil has religious significance in the Greek Orthodox Church, where it is used to sprinkle holy water. The Bulgarian Orthodox Church, Serbian Orthodox Church, Macedonian Orthodox Church and Romanian Orthodox Church use basil (Bulgarian: босилек, bosilek; Serbian: босиљак, bosiljak; Macedonian: босилек, bosilek) to prepare holy water and pots of basil are often placed below church altars. Some Greek Orthodox Christians avoid eating it due to its association with the legend of the Elevation of the Holy Cross.

=== Art and literature ===
In Giovanni Boccaccio's 14th century Decameron, the fifth story of the narrative's fourth day involves a pot of basil as a central plot device. This famous story inspired John Keats to write his 1814 poem "Isabella, or the Pot of Basil", which was in turn the inspiration for two paintings of the Pre-Raphaelite Brotherhood: John Everett Millais's Isabella in 1849 and in 1868 the Isabella and the Pot of Basil by William Holman Hunt.

== See also ==
- List of basil cultivars
