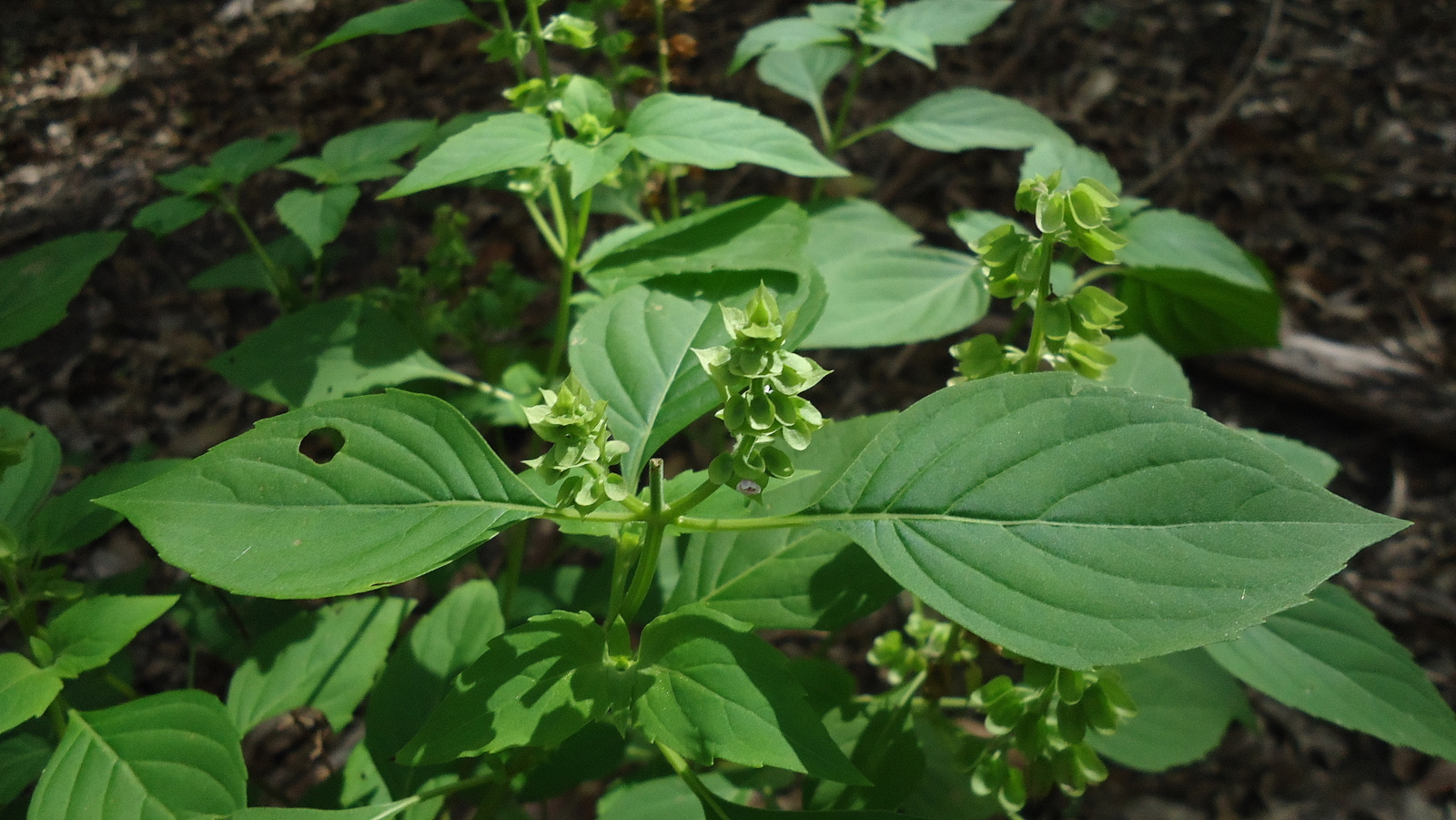

Scientific classification
- Kingdom: Plantae
- Clade: Tracheophytes
- Clade: Angiosperms
- Clade: Eudicots
- Clade: Asterids
- Order: Lamiales
- Family: Lamiaceae
- Genus: Ocimum
- Species: O. campechianum

Binomial name
- Ocimum campechianum Mill.

Synonyms
- Ocimum micranthum Willd.

= Ocimum campechianum =

Species of plant

Ocimum campechianum is a plant species in the family Lamiaceae, widespread across Mexico, Central America, South America, the West Indies, and Florida.

Leaves of Ocimum campechianum are eaten in Brazil's Amazon jungle. Similar to basil, it has a pungent flavor and contains essential oils which have been used ethnomedicinally. In Amazonia, the aromatic leaves are used as an admixture in ayahuasca brews. The plant is known as albahaca in Mexico and called xkakaltun in Mexico's Yucatan Peninsula, where it is considered a honey plant and is used as an abortifacient. It is referred to in Brazil as alfavaca and has also been referred to as albahaca del monte, Amazonian basil, wild sweet basil, wild mosquito plant, least basil, Peruvian basil, spice basil, alfavaca-do-campo, manjericao and estoraque.

== Essential oil ==
Essential oil from O. campechianum has been tested for its in vitro food-related biological activities and found comparable to the essential oils of common basil and thyme and superior in its capacity as an antioxidant. It has also been found to possess antifungal activity against food spoiling yeasts. The leaves have the highest concentration of essential oil (4.3%). Multiple chemotypes exist within the species and can be distinguished by analyzing the essential oil by gas chromatography (GC) and/or GC isotope ratio mass spectrometry.
