= Lettuce leaf basil =

Variety of flowering plant

Lettuce leaf basil is a large-leaf variety of Ocimum basilicum (sweet basil). The large, crinkled leaves, which grow on the short, wide plant, are sweet, but not as strong as other sweet basils. This makes them particularly suitable for tossing into salads or wrapping fish, chicken or a rice stuffing for grilling.
