= Isoeugenol synthase =

Class of enzymes

Identifiers
- EC no.: 1.1.1.319

Databases
- IntEnz: IntEnz view
- BRENDA: BRENDA entry
- ExPASy: NiceZyme view
- KEGG: KEGG entry
- MetaCyc: metabolic pathway
- PRIAM: profile
- PDB structures: RCSB PDB PDBe PDBsum
Search
- PMC: articles
- PubMed: articles
- NCBI: proteins

Isoeugenol synthase (EC 1.1.1.319, IGS1, t-anol/isoeugenol synthase 1) is an enzyme with systematic name eugenol:NADP^{+} oxidoreductase (coniferyl acetate reducing). This enzyme catalyses the following chemical reaction.

coniferyl acetate
+ NADPH
H^{+}
H^{+}
isoeugenol
+ CH_{3}CO_{2}H + NADP^{+}

The usual substrate is coniferyl acetate which gives isoeugenol.
