= Dark opal basil =

Basil cultivar

Ocimum basilicum 'Dark Opal'
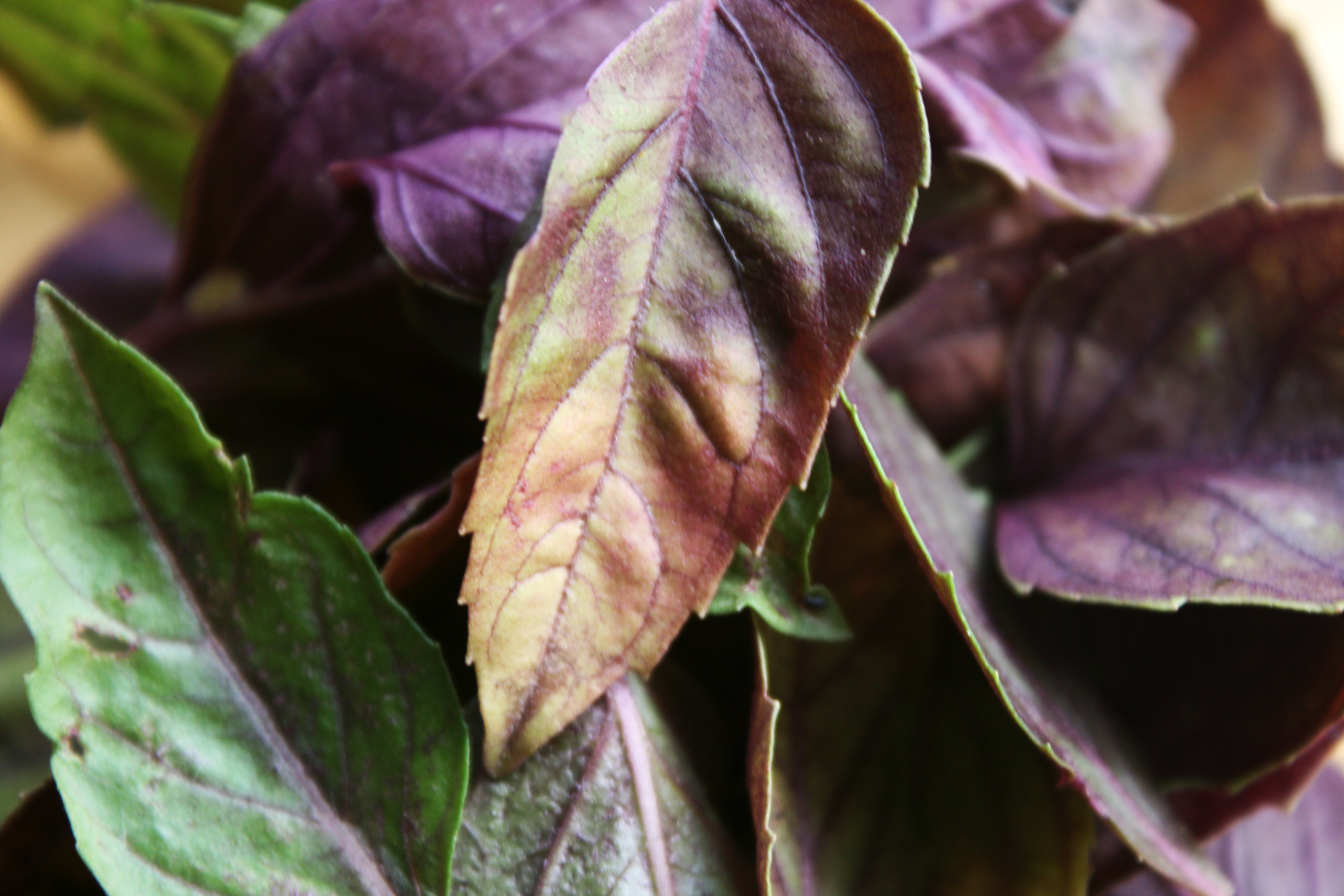
- A bunch of dark opal basil leaves
- Species: Ocimum basilicum var. purpureum
- Cultivar: 'Dark Opal'
- Origin: John Scarchuk and Joseph Lent, University of Connecticut, 1950s

Dark opal basil is a cultivar of Ocimum basilicum (sweet basil), developed by John Scarchuk and Joseph Lent at the University of Connecticut in the 1950s. With deep purple, sometimes mottled leaves, it is grown as much for its decorative appeal as for its culinary value. Dark opal basil was a 1962 winner of the All-American Selection award.

Like other purple basils, the purple color is from anthocyanins, especially cyanidin-3-(di-p-coumarylglucoside)-5-glucoside but also other cyanidin based and peonidin based compounds. 'Dark opal', along with other large leaved purple cultivars such as 'Purple Ruffles', has a high concentration of anthocyanins and is considered a potential source of red pigments for the food industry. The anthocyanin concentration is about 18 mg per 100 g fresh leaves, similar to Perilla frutescens, and greater than smaller leaved purple basils such as 'Purple bush' (at about 6 mg per 100 g).
