= Peonidin =

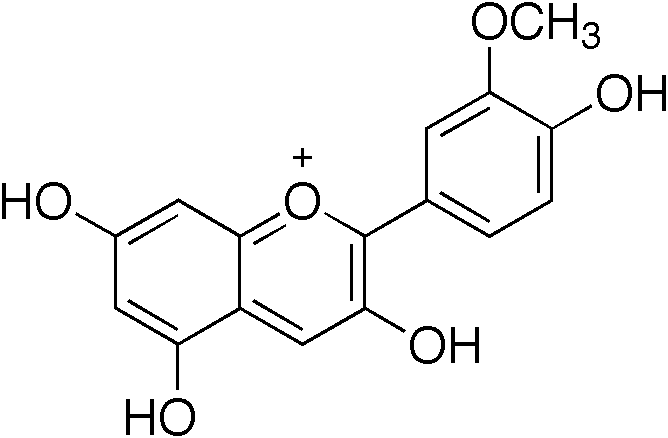

Names
- IUPAC name 3,4′,5,7-Tetrahydroxy-3′-methoxyflavylium
- Systematic IUPAC name 3,5,7-Trihydroxy-2-(4-hydroxy-3-methoxyphenyl)-1λ^{4}-benzopyran-1-ylium

Identifiers
CAS Number	134-01-0
3D model (JSmol)	Interactive image
ChEBI	CHEBI:75033
ChEMBL	ChEMBL1277324
ChemSpider	390370
KEGG	C08726
PubChem CID	164544
UNII	D0O766G47B
CompTox Dashboard (EPA)	DTXSID80861792
- InChI: InChI=1S/C16H12O6.ClH/c1-21-15-4-8(2-3-11(15)18)16-13(20)7-10-12(19)5-9(17)6-14(10)22-16;/h2-7H,1H3,(H3-,17,18,19,20);1H Key: OGBSHLKSHNAPEW-UHFFFAOYSA-N
- SMILES: COc1cc(-c2[o+]c3cc(O)cc(O)c3cc2O)ccc1O.[Cl-]

Properties
Chemical formula	C_{16}H_{13}ClO_{6}
Molar mass	336.72 g/mol
- Except where otherwise noted, data are given for materials in their standard state (at 25 °C [77 °F], 100 kPa). verify (what is ?) Infobox references

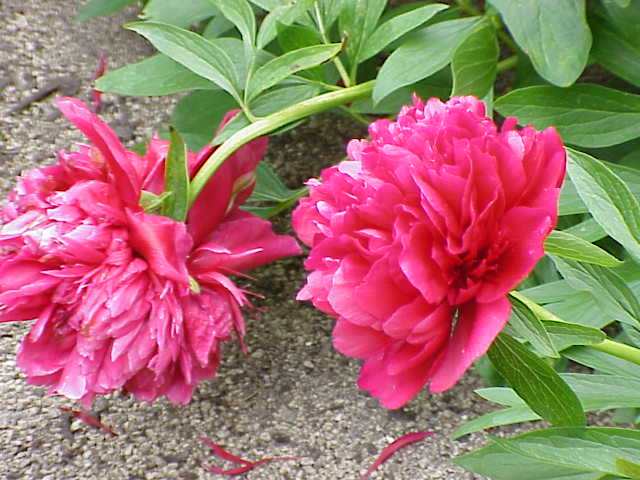
The generic garden peony

Peonidin is an O-methylated anthocyanidin derived from cyanidin, and a primary plant pigment. Peonidin gives purplish-red hues to flowers, such as the peony, from which it takes its name, and roses. It is present in some blue flowers, such as the morning glory, and red, purple, and blue berries and grapes.

== Chemistry ==
Like most anthocyanidins, it is pH sensitive, and changes from red to blue as pH rises because anthocyanidins are highly conjugated chromophores. When the pH is changed, the extent of the conjugation (of the double bonds) is altered, which alters the wavelength of light energy absorbed by the molecule. At pH 2.0, peonidin is cherry red; at 3.0 a strong yellowish pink; at 5.0 it is grape red-purple; and at 8.0 it becomes deep blue; unlike many anthocyanidins, however, it is stable at higher pH, and has been isolated as a blue colorant from the brilliant "Heavenly Blue" morning glory (Ipomoea tricolor Cav cv).

Peonidin (pH indicator)
below pH 2		above pH 8
2	⇌	8

Because of its unusual color stability, a cafeyl-acylated buffered formulation of it has been patented for use as a food coloring.

== In food ==
A dietary source of peonidin is raw blueberries, which contain 20 mg per 100 g of fruit. Peonidin has been found in concentrations of up to 40 mg per 100 g (cooked) of certain cultivars of purple fleshed sweet potatoes, with the amount varying across cultivars.

== See also ==
- Peonidin-3-O-glucoside, found in red onion
