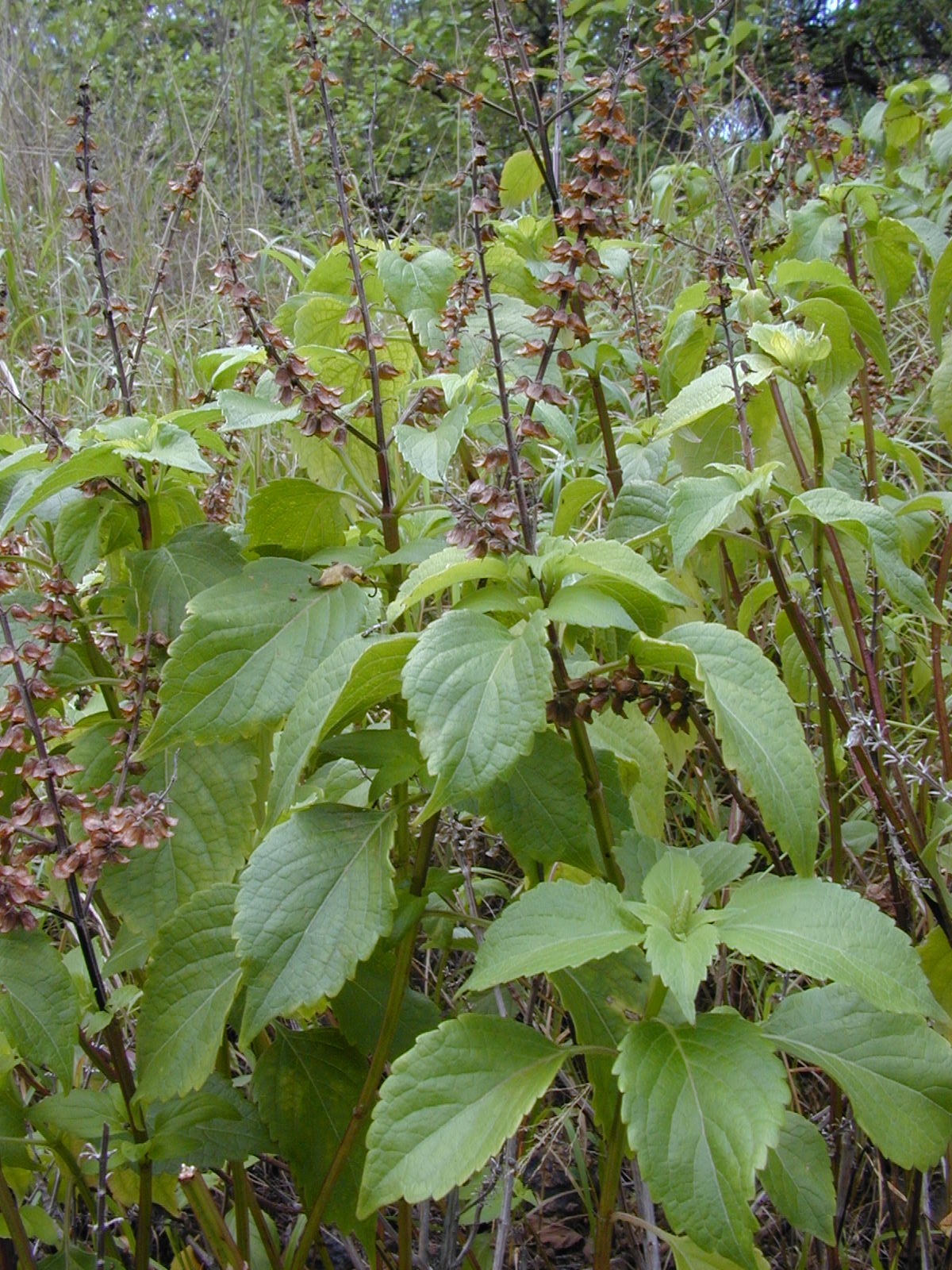
- In Hawaii

Scientific classification
- Kingdom: Plantae
- Clade: Tracheophytes
- Clade: Angiosperms
- Clade: Eudicots
- Clade: Asterids
- Order: Lamiales
- Family: Lamiaceae
- Genus: Ocimum
- Species: O. gratissimum

Binomial name
- Ocimum gratissimum L.

= Ocimum gratissimum =

African basil

Species of basil

Ocimum gratissimum, also known as African basil, clove basil, East Indian basil, Russian basil, shrubby basil, tree basil, and in Hawaii as wild basil, is a species of basil. It is native to Africa (including Madagascar) and southern Asia and introduced to Mexico, Panama, the West Indies, Brazil, Bolivia and the Pacific.

== Uses ==
In Nigeria, scent leaves are used in making pepper soup, local rice, beans, plantains, even regular soup, and other delicacies.

== Seed germination ==
Seeds seem to need strong sunlight to germinate, although germination has been achieved even during an average UK summer.

== Phytochemical compounds ==
The phytochemicals present in Ocimum gratissimum are polyphenols such as gallic acid, rosmanol, rosmarinic acid, flavonoids such as nepetin, quercetin, rutin, catechin, and also alkaloids and terpenoids. Also present are naringin, uteolin, nepetoidin, nevadensin, hymenoxin, salvigenin, apigenin, apigenin-7,4',-dimethyl ether, basilimoside, 2-alpha,3-beta-dihydroxyolean-12-en-28-oic acid, methyl acetate, and oleanolic acid.

== Pharmacology of extracts and essential oils ==
The essential oil of Ocimum gratissimum contains eugenol and shows some evidence of antibacterial activity. The essential oil has potential for use as a food preservative, and is toxic to Leishmania.

== Insect repellent ==
Ocimum gratissimum repels the thrips Thrips tabaci, and so is a useful insect repellent in other crops.
