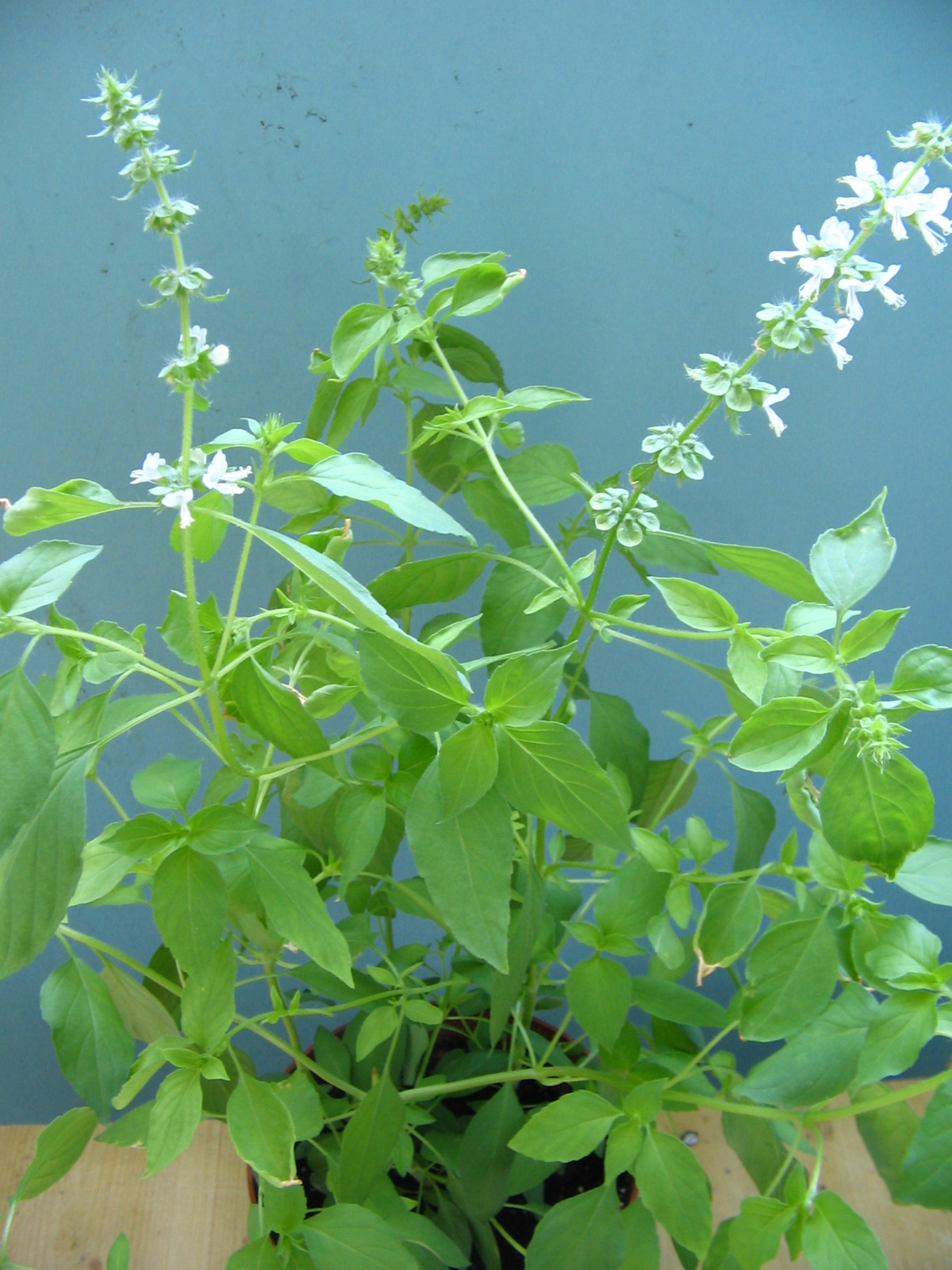

Scientific classification
- Kingdom: Plantae
- Clade: Tracheophytes
- Clade: Angiosperms
- Clade: Eudicots
- Clade: Asterids
- Order: Lamiales
- Family: Lamiaceae
- Genus: Ocimum
- Species: O. × africanum

Binomial name
- Ocimum × africanum Lour.

Synonyms
- Ocimum americanum var. pilosum (Willd.) A.J.Paton; Ocimum basilicum var. anisatum Benth.; Ocimum basilicum var. pilosum (Willd.) Benth.; Ocimum citriodorum Vis.; Ocimum graveolens A.Br.; Ocimum petitianum A.Rich.; Ocimum pilosum Willd.

= Lemon basil =

Species of plant

Lemon basil, hoary basil, Thai lemon basil, or Lao basil, (Ocimum × africanum) is a hybrid between basil (Ocimum basilicum) and American basil (Ocimum americanum). The herb is grown primarily in northeastern Africa and southern Asia for its fragrant lemon scent, and is used in cooking.

Lemon basil stems can grow to 20–40 cm (8–20 in) tall. It has white flowers in late summer to early fall. The leaves are similar to basil leaves, but tend to be narrower with slightly serrated edges. Seeds form on the plant after flowering and dry on the plant.

Lemon basil is a popular herb in Arab, Indonesian, Filipino, Lao, Malay, Indian, Persian and Thai cuisine.

== Uses ==
=== Culinary ===
In Lao cuisine, (where it is called pak i tou,) lemon basil is used extensively in soups, stews, curries and stir-fried dishes as it is the most commonly used type of basil in Laos. Many Lao stews require the use of lemon basil as no other basil varieties are acceptable as substitutes. The most popular Lao stew called or lam uses lemon basil as a key ingredient.

Lemon basil is used much in Indonesian cuisine, where it is called kemangi. It is often eaten raw with salad or lalap (raw vegetables) and accompanied by sambal. Lemon basil is often used to season certain Indonesian dishes, such as curries, soup, stew and steamed or grilled dishes. In Thailand, Lemon basil, called maenglak (Thai: แมงลัก), is one of several types of basil used in Thai cuisine. The leaves are used in certain Thai curries and it is also indispensable for the noodle dish khanom chin nam ya. In the Philippines, where it is called sangig, particularly in Cebu and parts of Mindanao, Lemon basil is used to add flavor to law-uy, which is an assortment of local greens in a vegetable-based soup. The seeds resemble chia seeds after they have been soaked in water and are used in sweet desserts. It is also used in North East part of India state Manipur. In Manipur, it is used in curry like pumpkin, used in singju (a form of salad), and in red or green chilli pickles. The Garo, Khasi and Jaintia tribe of Meghalaya also use it in their cuisine. The Garos call it panet (pronounced phanet). They use it to prepare cold sauce (Ind. Chutney) with added ingredients like fermented fish, chile, onions sometimes roasted tomatoes. In Tripura, it is known as banta, and is used by Tripuri community to make banta mosdeng, a fermented fish-based spicy chutney.

In Nigerian cuisine, lemon basil is referred to as partminger or curry leaf, not to be confused with the unrelated curry tree Bergera koenigii cultivated in the Indian subcontinent.

== Cultivation ==
Lemon basil requires the same care as other basil varieties. It is a tropical plant, that should be in a spot receiving at least six hours of direct sunlight a day. It is actually quite hardy and can sometimes grow continuously given only water, but the flavor will be at risk if not given any fertilizer, chemical or organic. It can really grow in a matter of weeks. It should be watered whenever the topmost part of the soil is dry. At this time, the plant will wilt, but will be back to normal once watered.

Basil should never reach flowering during the harvesting periods. If given a chance to flower, its flavor will be sacrificed and the leaves become smaller, dry and leathery. Once the flower clusters form, they should be removed so the plant will continue its vegetative growth. It is, however, a good idea for it to be left to flower and set seeds that will be collected during fall, because the cold winter frosts will kill the basil plant anyway. Harvesting the seeds two weeks before the last frost, and sowing them indoors in the spring will provide next year's harvest.

Harvesting once a week for each plant will make it bushy due to the side shoots that will develop. The plant should never be completely defoliated. Propagation is achieved by sowing seeds and from stem cuttings. Seedlings will reach 150 mm (6 in) in 3–4 weeks and should be harvested at this time to let them branch out. Stem cuttings will gain root after they have a week of being soaked in water. The setup is simply a Mason jar filled with water and a square of mesh with holes large enough to hold the plant in place while the roots grow. As many cuttings as the gardener wishes can be planted, preferably the most vigorous stems that can be found because they will root faster. The water should be changed every few days. After 2–3 weeks, the roots will be long enough for the cuttings to be transplanted into pots or planted in their permanent position to keep in the garden.
