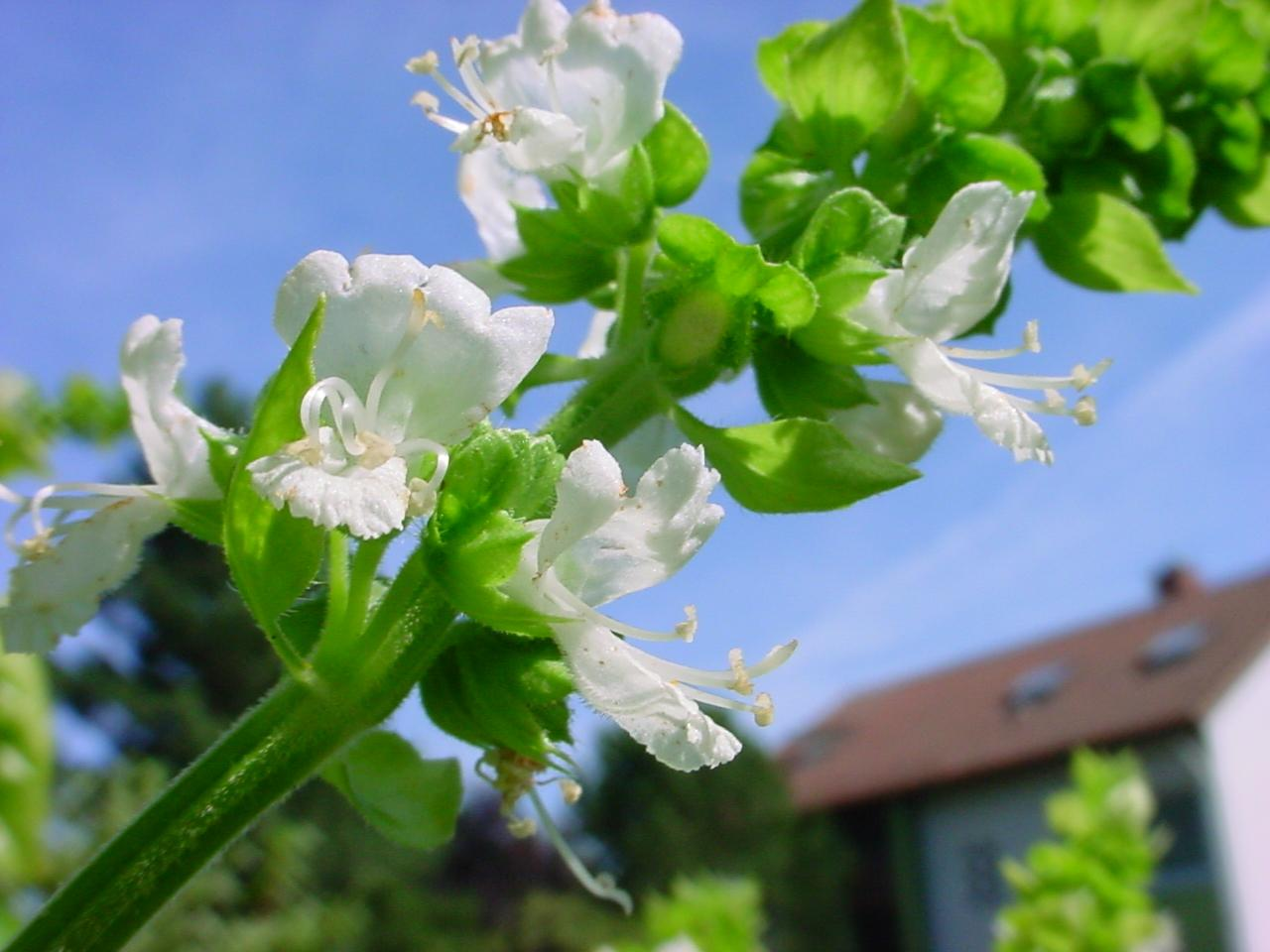
- A flowering stalk of O. americanum

Scientific classification
- Kingdom: Plantae
- Clade: Tracheophytes
- Clade: Angiosperms
- Clade: Eudicots
- Clade: Asterids
- Order: Lamiales
- Family: Lamiaceae
- Genus: Ocimum
- Species: O. americanum

Binomial name
- Ocimum americanum L.

Synonyms
- Ocimum album Roxb.; Ocimum brachiatum Blume; Ocimum canum Sims; Ocimum dichotomum Hochst. ex Benth.; Ocimum dinteri Briq.; Ocimum fluminense Vell.; Ocimum fruticulosum Burch.; Ocimum hispidulum Schumach. & Thonn.; Ocimum incanescens Mart.; Ocimum stamineum Sims; Ocimum thymoides Baker

= Ocimum americanum =

Species of flowering plant

Ocimum americanum, known as American basil, lime basil, or hoary basil, is a species of an annual herb in the family Lamiaceae. Despite the misleading name, it is native to Africa, the Indian subcontinent, China, and Southeast Asia. The species is naturalized in Queensland, Christmas Island, and parts of tropical America.

== Description and uses ==
It is a hairy annual herbaceous plant that grows up to 40 cm tall, with toothed, opposite leaves and small, white or purple flowers in clusters. The plant has a long taproot that extends deep into the ground. The entire plant is highly aromatic, with an odor comparable to citrus. As such, it can be used for culinary purposes in similar ways to sweet basil (O. basilicum). It is also used for essential oil whose scent appears to be a natural blend between that of lime peels and that of O. basilicum. The plant has medicinal properties as well.
