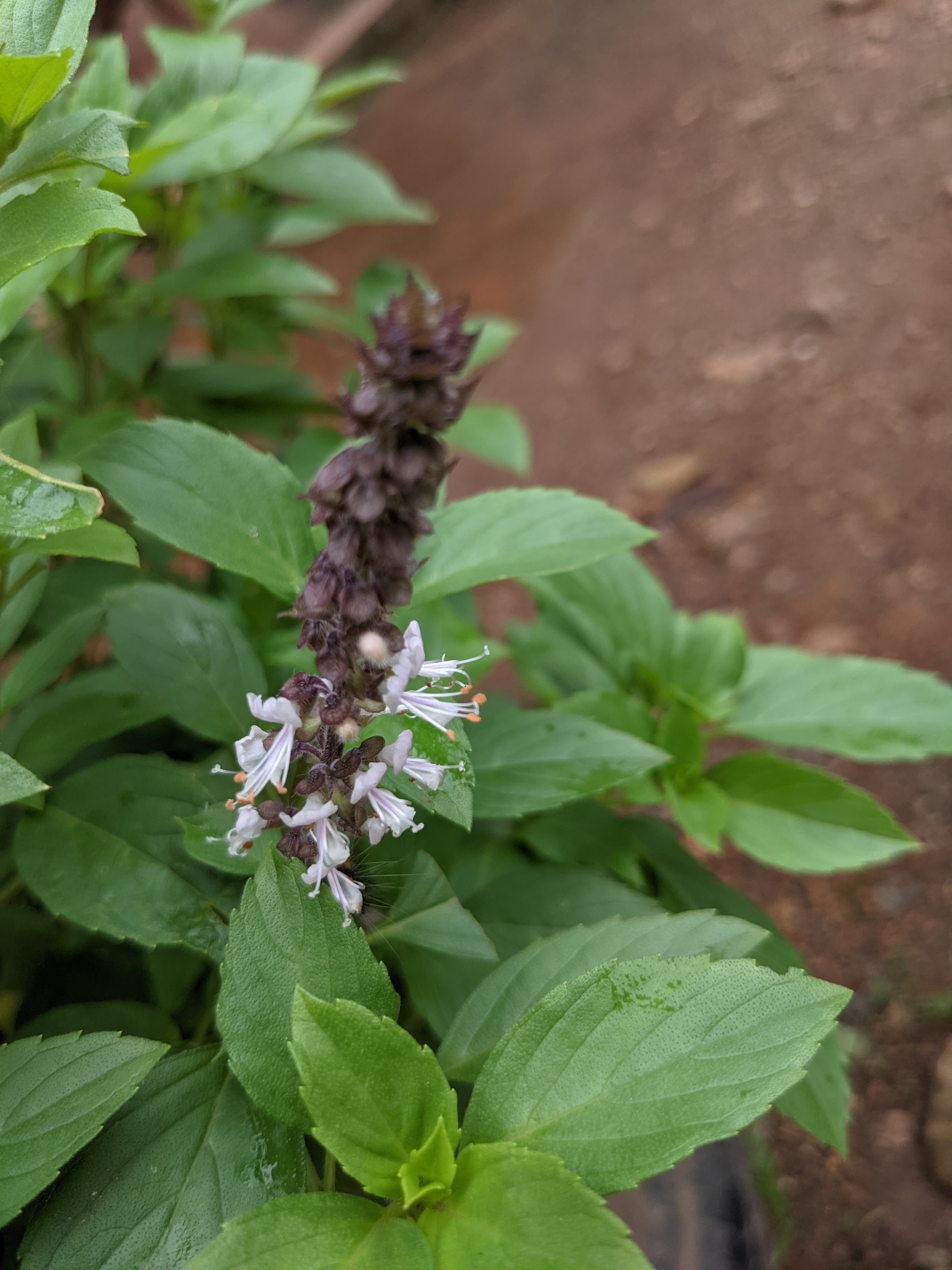

Scientific classification
- Kingdom: Plantae
- Clade: Embryophytes
- Clade: Tracheophytes
- Clade: Spermatophytes
- Clade: Angiosperms
- Clade: Eudicots
- Clade: Asterids
- Order: Lamiales
- Family: Lamiaceae
- Genus: Ocimum
- Species: O. kilimandscharicum

Binomial name
- Ocimum kilimandscharicum Gürke

Synonyms
- Ocimum johnstonii Baker; Ocimum tortuosum Baker

= Ocimum kilimandscharicum =

Species of flowering plant

Ocimum kilimandscharicum, also known as camphor basil, is a basil species native to Kenya, Tanzania, Uganda, Sudan, and Ethiopia.
