= Genovese basil =

Basil cultivar

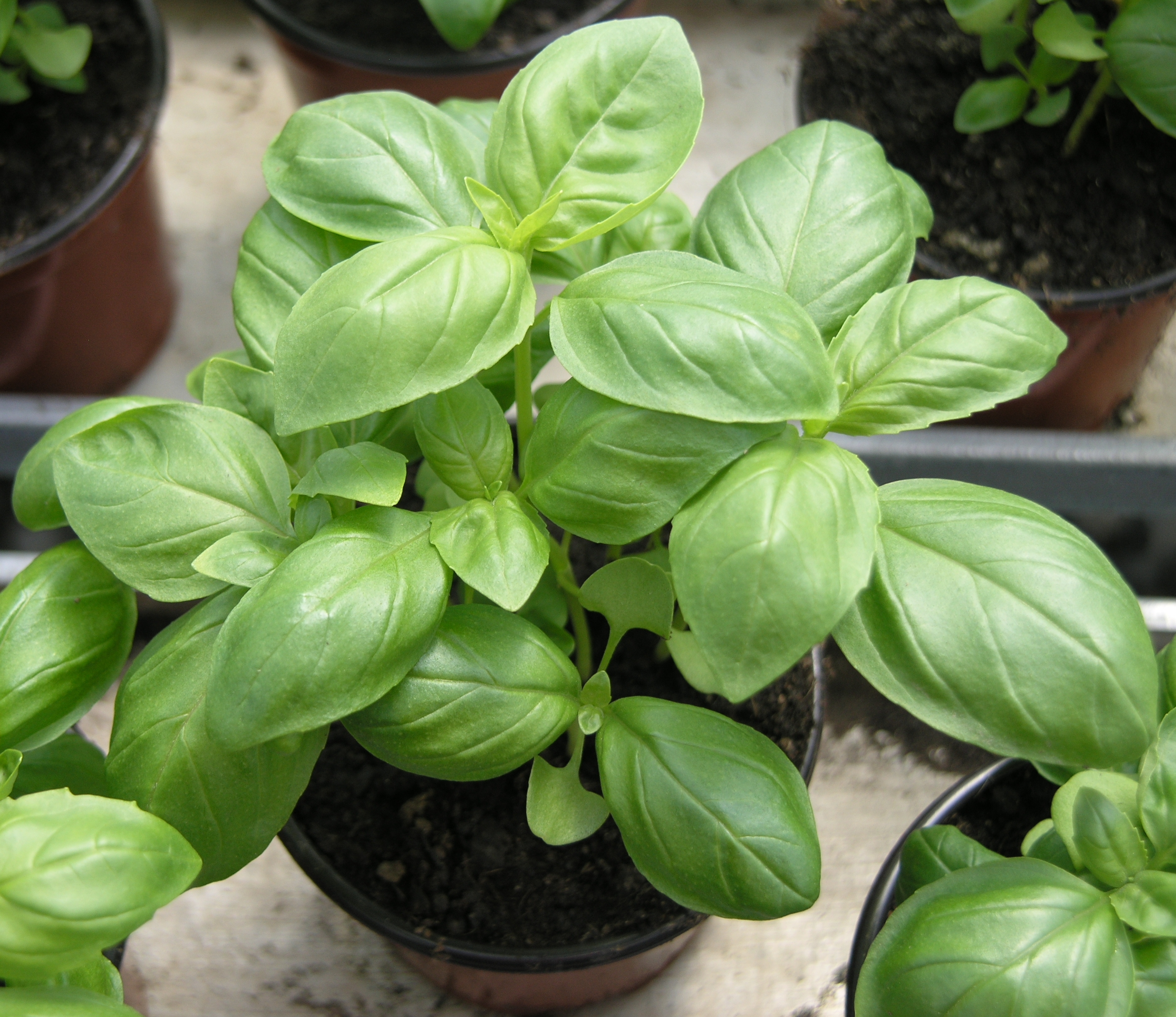
- Leaves of Genovese basil
- Place of origin: Italy
- Region or state: Liguria

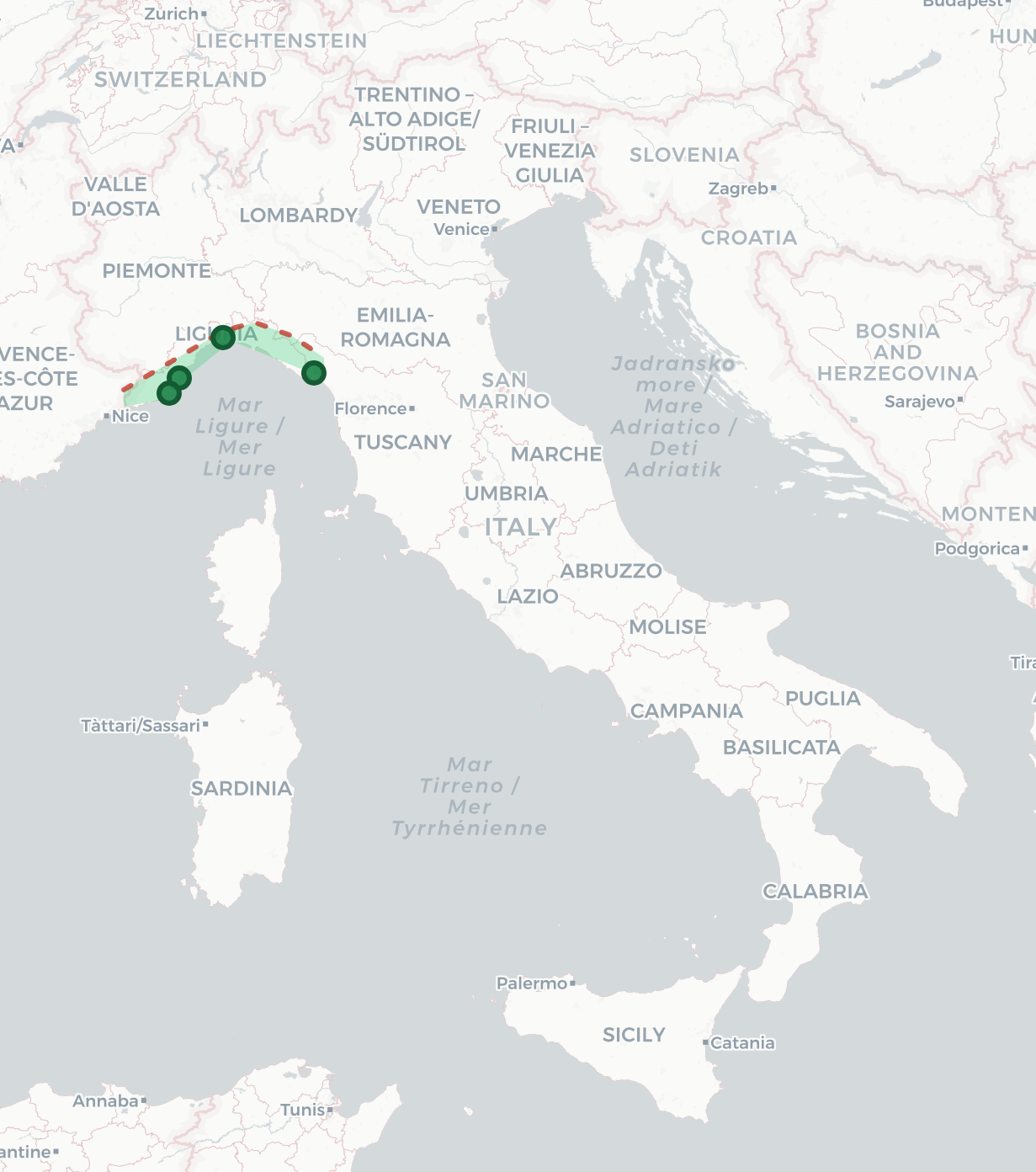
Production area of Genovese basil: Genoa Pra', Piana di Albenga, Diano Marina, and Sarzana

Genovese basil (Italian: basilico genovese), also known as Italian basil, is a specific cultivar of basil (Ocimum basilicum) originating in the Italian region of Liguria. It is widely used in Italian cuisine and considered the essential ingredient for authentic Genovese pesto, a traditional sauce historically produced in the Italian city of Genoa and the broader region. Genovese basil is a certified protected designation of origin (PDO) product of Liguria and the communes of Genoa, Imperia, Savona.

== Origins ==
The term Ocimum basilicum is derived from the Greek basilikón ('royal'), reflecting the high regard for this plant in ancient civilizations, where it was often used for ceremonial and religious purposes. Although introduced to the Mediterranean by the Romans for its medicinal and herbal properties, basil remained primarily an ornamental or therapeutic plant for centuries.

Legend attributes the birth of basil-based condiment to a monk at the convent of San Basilio on the heights of Genoa, who allegedly mixed the herb with pine nuts and garlic offered by the faithful. However, its intensive gastronomic use only began between the 18th and 19th centuries, when the plant found its ideal habitat in Liguria for varietal selection aimed at food consumption.

During the 19th century, basil cultivation became a specialized horticultural trade in the peri-urban areas of Genoa. Historical production centers included the Bisagno Valley, home to the "Besagnini" (local vegetable gardeners), and the hills of Pra' in the city's west. The microclimate of Pra', characterized by slopes that favor drainage and constant exposure to sea breezes, became synonymous with superior quality. By the 1990s, the area became the hub for greenhouse production, allowing fresh basil to be available year-round.

== Description ==
Basil is an annual herb in the Lamiaceae family. Originally from India and tropical Asia, it was known to the ancient Egyptians as a sacred plant and later described by Roman authors such as Pliny the Elder.

Genovese basil is grown exclusively on the maritime slope of Liguria according to strict production regulations (disciplinare) requiring traditional cultivation in natural soil. It is not a single cultivar but a certified type of cultivation. It is distinguished by small, oval, and convex leaves with a light green color. Its scent is delicate and specifically lacks any hint of mint.

The leaves are the primary morphological element of interest, often described as "bubble-like" due to their convex shape. Authorized seeds must belong to certified native ecotypes. Common cultivars used for this production include "Gigante Genovese" and "Nano Compatto".

== Chemical profile ==
The distinction between Genovese basil and other varieties is scientifically grounded in phytochemical analysis. The essential oil is a complex mixture of monoterpenes and phenylpropanoids.

Scientific research identifies trans-α-bergamotene as the specific chemical marker for authentic Ligurian-grown basil. This sesquiterpene is present in high concentrations in PDO-certified plants but nearly absent in varieties from other Mediterranean regions.

The absence of a minty scent is a mandatory requirement. While commercial varieties often have high eucalyptol (1,8-cineole) content, giving a medicinal flavor, Genovese basil focuses on the biosynthesis of linalool, avoiding enzymatic pathways that produce camphor or menthol.

=== Nutritional Properties ===
Genovese basil is a key component of the Mediterranean diet, rich in micronutrients and antioxidants.

Nutritional values of fresh PDO basil per 100g
Nutrients	Value	Notes
Energy	23 - 42 kcal	Very low calorie
Water	92.06 g	High hydration
Protein	3.15 g	Significant for an herb
Fiber	1.6 - 5.2 g	
Calcium	177 - 250 mg	Higher than many vegetables
Iron	3.17 - 5.5 mg	Non-heme iron source
Vitamin K	414.8 μg	592% of RDA
Vitamin A	3142 μg	Mostly Beta-carotene
Vitamin C	18 - 29 mg	Antioxidant

== Cultivation ==
Genovese Basil requires light, well-oxygenated soil with balanced calcium and organic matter.

- Soil preparation: mechanical tiling for radical development and a pH between 6.0 and 7.5.
- Sanitization: mandatory use of steam for soil disinfection. Chemical residues such as methyl bromide are strictly prohibited.
- Sowing: manual sowing at a depth of 0.5 cm in rows (called tacche).

=== Greenhouse cultivation ===
Greenhouse farming is a Ligurian specialty that allows for year-round fresh basil. The environment is climate-controlled, heated in winter, and shaded in summer. The plants are harvested exclusively by hand. Workers lie on wooden planks suspended above the crop to avoid trampling the soil. The plants are pulled up with their roots and tied into small bunches (3-10 plants) or larger "bouquets" (30-100 plants).

=== Open-field cultivation ===
Used primarily for the food processing industry (pesto producers), basil is grown outdoors during summer months. Harvest involves cutting the tender, fragrant upper tips of the plant.

== Protection and PDO status ==
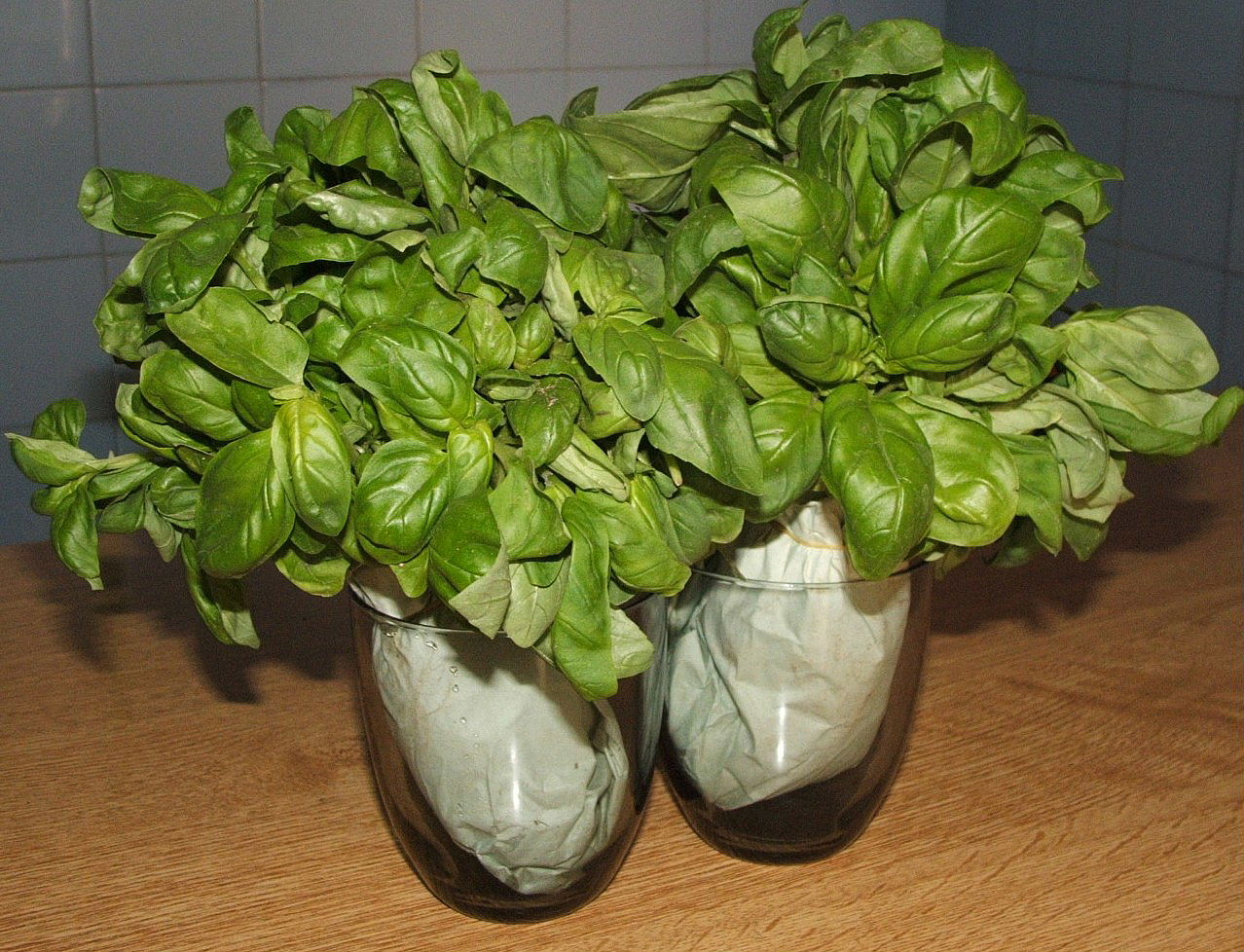
Two bunches of original basil from Pra'

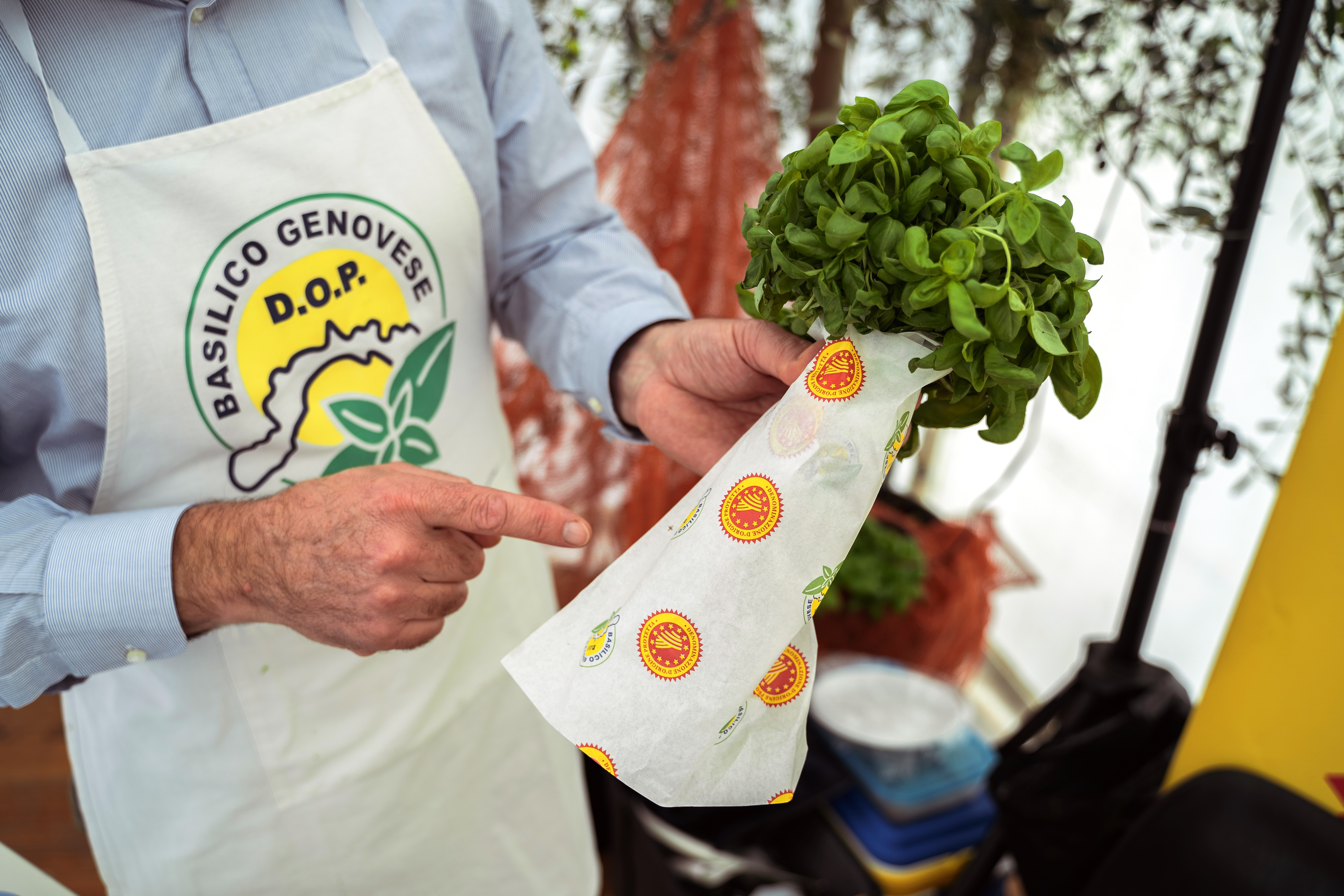
Packaging of a PDO Genovese basil bouquet showing the official logos

The PDO recognition process concluded in October 2005. The Consorzio di Tutela Basilico Genovese DOP (Consortium for the Protection of Genovese Basil PDO) was officially recognized in 2008 by the Italian Ministry of Agriculture.

The PDO certification ensures the product's origin within Liguria and adherence to traditional methods. The official logo features a circular shape with "Basilico Genovese" in blue, the "DOP" acronym on a yellow background, a stylized map of Liguria, and a green basil plant with three pairs of leaves.

In 2006, the "Basilico di Pra' Park" was inaugurated in Genoa at Villa Lomellini-Doria-Podestà to celebrate the herb's history. Since 2019, it has been managed by the IPSSA "Nino Bergese" hospitality institute.

== Economy ==
Genovese basil is a vital economic driver for Ligurian agriculture. In 2024, Italy's "PDO Economy" reached €20.7 billion in production value.

As of 2023, the sector included 56 certified operators over 80 hectares. While the acreage is small, the value-per-hectare is among the highest in Italian fruit and vegetable production. Genovese basil represents about 8% of the global basil market in Italy, producing over 1 million bunches annually.

== See also ==
- Ligurian cuisine
- Pesto
