= The Connecticut State Medical Society =

Medical society in Connecticut

The Connecticut State Medical Society (CSMS) is a professional organization for physicians in the U.S. state of Connecticut. It was founded as the Connecticut Medical Society in 1792. The Society was involved in the creation of many of Connecticut's medical institutions, including the Medical Institution of Yale College (now the Yale School of Medicine), the New Haven Hospital (now Yale New Haven Hospital), and the Hartford Retreat for the Insane (now the Institute of Living). The CSMS belongs to a network of county and state medical societies, as well as the American Medical Association.

== Early history ==
In the late 18th century, physicians in Connecticut worked toward legislation that would better regulate the practice of medicine. Politicians opposed to the creation of a state medical society suspected that doctors sought to create a monopoly and increase their income. Physicians assured the governor of Connecticut that a medical society with a licensing board would benefit citizens by providing protection from quack doctors and uneducated practitioners. In 1792, after a number of unsuccessful attempts by physicians to lobby the state government, the General Assembly of the State of Connecticut passed the Act of Incorporation of the Connecticut Medical Society. It is believed to be the first private charter to be granted by the State of Connecticut. The stated purpose of the Society was “the improving of medical practice, medical education, and friendly relations among physicians.” Under the 1792 charter, medical societies were created in each of Connecticut's eight counties. Membership in the State Medical Society was made up of the combined memberships of the county societies. County societies were to elect representatives to the state society meetings. Until at least the 1850s, Connecticut was the only state with an established hierarchy of state and local medical societies.

The charter granted the Society the authority to appoint an examining committee to issue medical licenses. Licensing began immediately and in 1800 an amendment to the charter ruled that the Society could require new physicians in Connecticut to obtain a license to practice. The state legislature later overruled this part of the charter amid the Popular Health Movement of the 1830s–1850s and increasing pressure from practitioners of alternative medicine, particularly from followers of Samuel Thompson. After the Medical Act of 1842, and until 1893, a license was not required to practice medicine in the state. The Society continued to grant licenses until the Medical Practice Act was passed 1893 and the State of Connecticut took on the responsibility. By then, three medical societies had been chartered, the regulars, eclectics, and homeopaths. The Act created licensing boards that represented the interests of each group, and required all practicing physicians to receive a certificate of registration from the State Board of Health.

The first meeting of the Connecticut Medical Society took place on October 9, 1792. The Society formalized its bylaws, established license and membership fees, and chose its official seal. Members would be required to reveal the contents of their prescriptions. Secret remedies and patent medicines were banned in an effort to combat quackery. In addition, members who were known to have “consulted” with anyone who prescribed secret or patent medicines were to be expelled from the Society. In 1797, Elisha Perkins, a founding member of the society, was expelled for patenting and marketing a metallic tractor he claimed could cure multiple diseases. While the medical establishment mostly denounced the invention, its popularity grew, with George Washington purchasing a pair of Perkins Tractors. The device was later proven to be fraudulent.

== Relationship with Yale ==
The charter of 1792 granted the Connecticut Medical Society not only the right to grant medical licenses to physicians, but also the exclusive authority to grant medical degrees in the state. When Yale University began planning for the creation of a medical school under president Timothy Dwight, cooperation with the state medical society was necessary. A committee, chaired by President Dwight, with representatives from both the Connecticut Medical Society and Yale College was formed and made recommendations on the creation of the medical school. After three years of negotiations, in 1810, the Connecticut Legislature passed legislation authorizing the Medical Society to join with Yale College to form the Medical Institution of Yale College, which formally opened in 1813.

During the first decades of medical education at Yale, the school was administered by both the college and the State Medical Society. A joint committee of the college and the Society chose the faculty and determined whether or not candidates would receive their degrees. The State Medical Society continued to grant all licenses. The Society changed its constitution so that candidates for a license were now required to take at least one course of medical lectures at Yale or another medical college. Two courses of lectures would be required for the degree of doctor of medicine. Additionally, the Society was allowed to choose one man per county to receive free education for a year, as the cost of medical education was set to increase.

Over time, the Society became less involved in the affairs of the medical school. In 1885, a mutual agreement ended the articles of union that had formed the joint project of the Medical Institution of Yale College and Yale took over sole administration of its medical school. The Society would no longer award medical degrees and Yale now had the right to determine the requirements for the degree.

== Other activities ==
The Connecticut Medical Society participated in the creation of the New Haven Hospital in 1826, now known as Yale New Haven Hospital. Members of the Society were involved in the creation of a State Board of Health in 1878, now called the Department of Public Health. The Society also informed the state legislature when the Medical Practice Act of 1893, and the Medical Practice Act of 1924, were passed. It has been involved in the passage of many other state bills throughout its history.

Care for the mentally ill has been a concern of the CSMS. In 1812 the Society formed its first committee to gather information on mentally ill persons in the state. In 1821 efforts began to organize a hospital for their care. The Society voted to allocate funds for the hospital and additional funds were secured from the public. In 1824, the state legislature passed a charter incorporating the Hartford Retreat for the Insane, which opened to its first patient on April 1 of that year. The Hartford Retreat remained the only institution of its kind in the state until the first public institution for the mentally ill opened in Middletown in 1867.

The CSMS gives testimony to the state legislature on medical issues. In 2022 it raised safety concerns over a proposed bill that would broaden who is permitted to perform abortions in the state. The Society opposed mandatory protective neck guards for youth hockey, calling for further research on their effectiveness. In 2021, the Society testified on an assisted-suicide bill, citing a "plurality of opinion" on the subject among physicians. The Society changed its stance from being against a patient's right to life-ending medication to “engaged neutrality” in 2019. Speaking on Connecticut's plan to legalize recreational marijuana, the CSMS stated “The rush towards legalization of recreational marijuana ignores how profit-driven corporations hooked generations of Americans on cigarettes and opioids, killing millions and straining public resources. Connecticut has an obligation to protect the health and welfare of its citizens and rushing to legalize a potentially unsafe drug abdicates this responsibility.”
