= John C. Gunn =

John C. Gunn may refer to:

- John Currie Gunn (1916-2002), Scottish scientist
- John C. Gunn, writer on the subject of the Popular Health Movement
