= Thomsonianism =

19th century alternative medicine system

Thomsonianism was an early 19th century American-based system of alternative medicine, developed and promoted by Samuel Thomson. It grew rapidly during the Popular Health Movement when many Americans distrusted expertise in general and physicians in particular. It was based on herbal treatments designed to regulate body heat, and rejected drugs, heavy bleeding and surgery. The cult faltered and factionalized in the 1850s, and was largely a spent force by the 1860s. However, its emphasis on herbal remedies was copied by other herbalist sects.

== History ==
In the 19th century the nation was flooded with medical sects promoting a wide range of alternative treatments for all ailments. The medical societies tried to impose licensing requirements in state law, but the eclectics undid their efforts. The most famous of the eclectics was Samuel Thomson (1769-1843), a self educated New England farm boy who developed a widely popular herbal medical system. He began full-time practice in 1805, set up the Friendly Botanic Societies in 1813, sold membership and a textbook for $20 that detailed his new methods. He promised that even the worst ailments could be cured without any harsh treatments. There would be no surgery, no deliberate bleeding, no powerful drugs. Disease was a matter of maladjustment in the body's internal heat, and could be cured by applying certain herbs and medicinal plants, coupled with vomiting, enemas, and steam baths. Thomson's approach resonated with workers and farmers who distrusted the bloody hands of traditional physicians. President Andrew Jackson endorsed the new fad, and Brigham Young promoted it to the new Mormon movement.

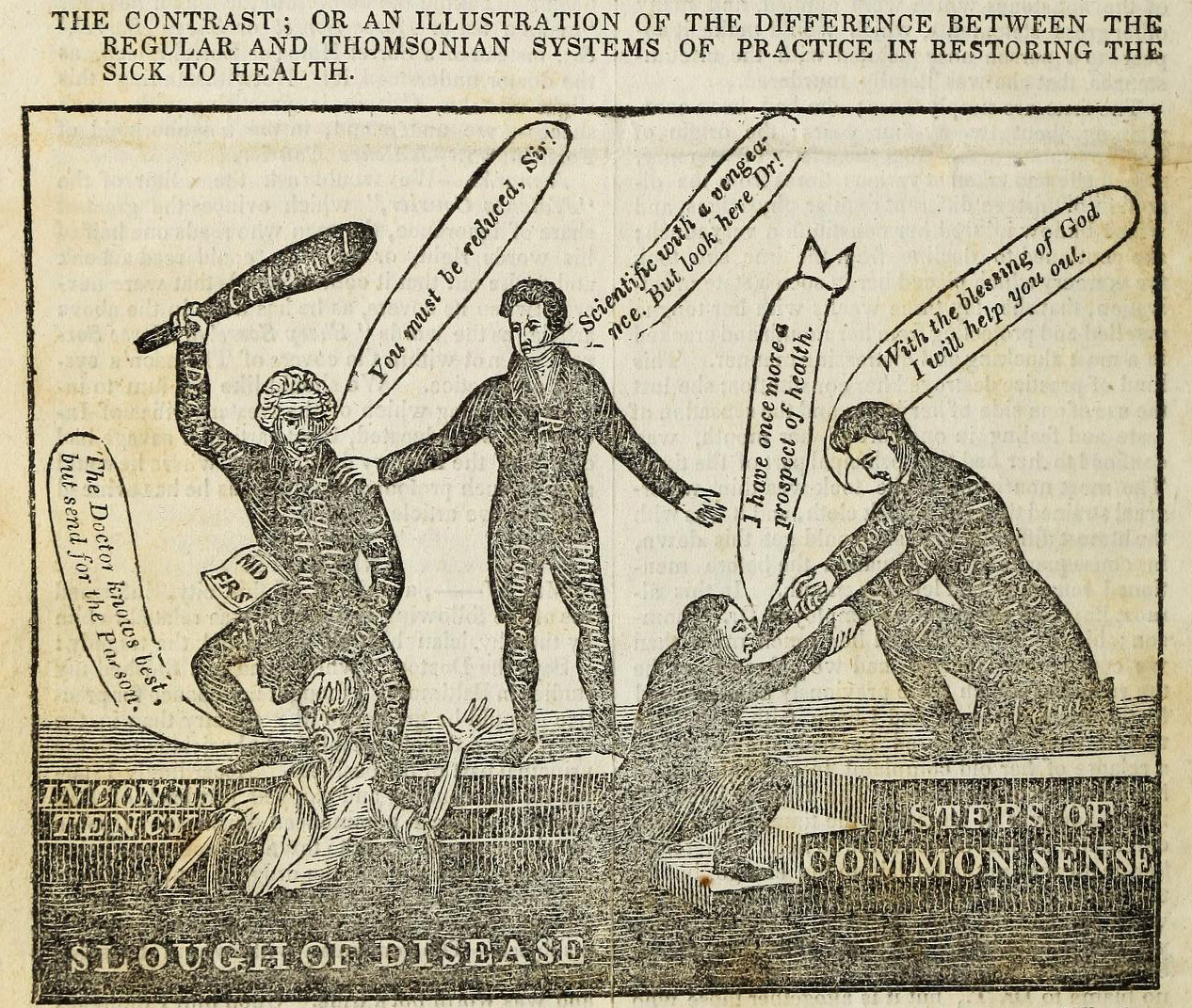
An 1834 cartoon depicting Thomson (on the right) saving a patient from brutal medical practices by the MD on the left.

Thomson was a master promoter. He patented his system and sold licenses to hundreds of field agents who gained patients during the cholera outbreaks of 1832 and 1834. By 1839, the movement claimed a million followers and was strongest in New England. Thomsonianism was characterized by historian Paul Starr as "a creative misreading of the Enlightenment because it viewed therapeutics within the framework of an egalitarian ideology that rejected the monopolization of scientific expertise using state licensing laws.

However, in the 1840s it all fell apart. Thomson died in 1843, many patients grew worse after the treatment, while a bitter schism emerged among the Thomsonian agents. This resulted in the sect's sharp decline by 1860. Nevertheless, Thomson's influence still can be seen among people suspicious of modern medicine. Many herbs he popularized, such as cayenne pepper, lobelia, and goldenseal, remain widely used to this day in herbal healing routines. The Thomsonians had been briefly successful in blocking state laws limiting medical practice to licensed physicians. After the collapse the MDs made a comeback and reimposed strict licensing laws on the practice of medicine.

== See also ==
- Alternative medicine
- Samuel Thomson
- Eclectic medicine
- Herbal medicine
- Phytotherapy
- Popular Health Movement
