= Herbal medicine =

Study and use of medicinal properties of plants

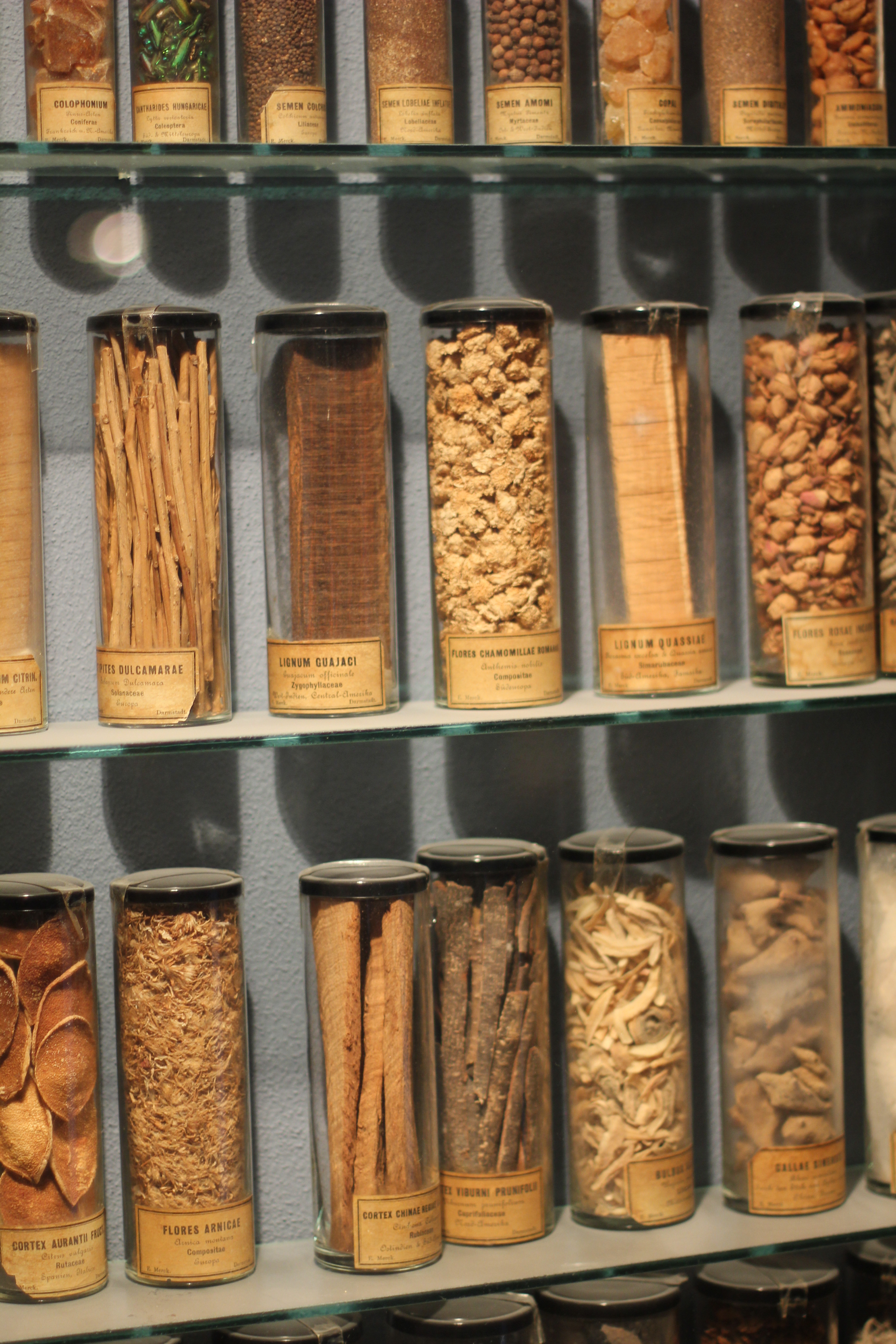
A selection of antique herbal medicines

Herbal medicine (also called herbalism, phytomedicine or phytotherapy) is the study of pharmacognosy and the use of medicinal plants, which are a basis of traditional medicine. Scientific evidence for the effectiveness of many herbal treatments remains limited, prompting ongoing regulatory evaluation and research into their safety and efficacy. Standards for purity or dosage are generally not provided. The scope of herbal medicine sometimes includes fungal and bee products, as well as minerals, shells and certain animal parts.

Paraherbalism is the pseudoscientific use of plant or animal extracts as medicine, relying on unproven beliefs about the safety and effectiveness of minimally processed natural substances.

Herbal medicine has been used since at least the Paleolithic era, with written records from ancient Sumer, Egypt, Greece, China, and India documenting its development and application over millennia. Modern herbal medicine is widely used globally, especially in Asia and Africa. Traditional medicine systems involve long-standing, culturally-embedded practices using local herbs, animal products, and spiritual elements. These systems have influenced and contributed to modern pharmacology. Herbalists believe that plants, having evolved defenses against environmental stressors, produce beneficial phytochemicals, often extracted from roots or leaves, that can be used in medicine.

Sick animals often seek out and eat plants containing compounds like tannins and alkaloids to help purge parasites—a behavior observed by scientists and sometimes cited by indigenous healers as the source of their knowledge.

== History ==
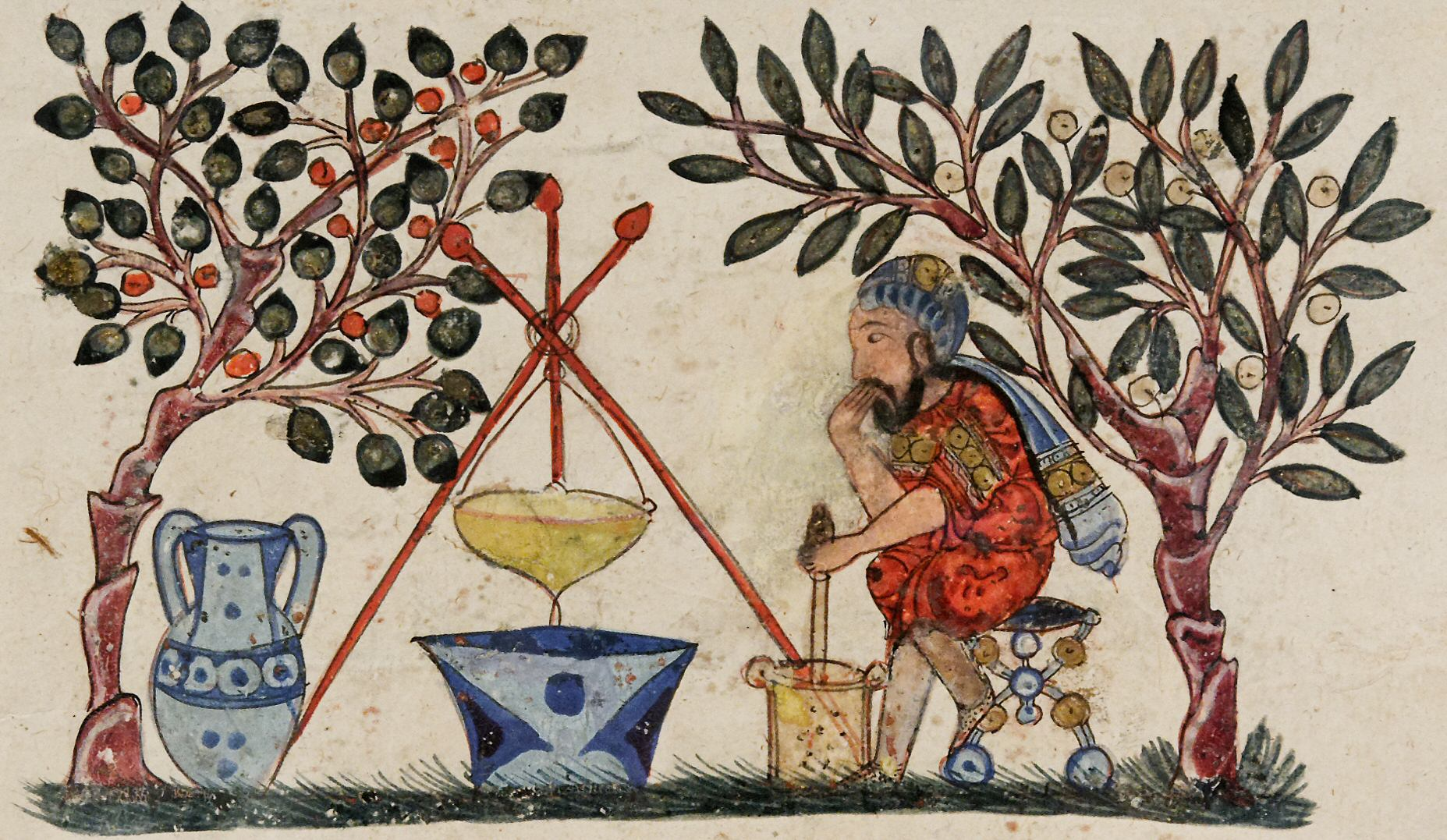
A physician preparing an elixir, from an Arabic version of Dioscorides's pharmacopoeia, 1224

Archaeological evidence indicates that the use of medicinal plants dates back to the Paleolithic age, approximately 60,000 years ago. Written evidence of herbal remedies dates back over 5,000 years to the Sumerians, who compiled lists of plants. Some ancient cultures wrote about plants and their medical uses in books called herbals. In ancient Egypt, herbs were mentioned in Egyptian medical papyri, depicted in tomb illustrations, or on rare occasions found in medical jars containing trace amounts of herbs. In ancient Egypt, the Ebers papyrus dates from about 1550 BCE, and covers more than 700 compounds, mainly of plant origin. The earliest known Greek herbals came from Theophrastus of Eresos who, in the 4th century BCE, wrote in Greek Historia Plantarum, from Diocles of Carystus who wrote during the 3rd century BCE, and from Krateuas who wrote in the 1st century BCE. Only a few fragments of these works have survived intact, but from what remains, scholars have noted an overlap with the Egyptian herbals.

Seeds likely used for herbalism were found in archaeological sites of Bronze Age China dating from the Shang dynasty (c. 1600 – c. 1046 BCE). Over a hundred of the 224 compounds mentioned in the Huangdi Neijing, an early Chinese medical text, are herbs. Herbs were also commonly used in the traditional medicine of ancient India, where the principal treatment for diseases was diet. De Materia Medica, originally written in Greek by Pedanius Dioscorides (c. 40 – c. 90 CE) of Anazarbus, Cilicia, a physician and botanist, is one example of herbal writing used over centuries until the 1600s.

== Modern herbal medicine ==
The World Health Organization (WHO) estimates that 80 percent of the population of some Asian and African countries presently uses herbal medicine for some aspect of primary health care.

Some prescription drugs have a basis as herbal remedies, including artemisinin, digoxin, quinine and taxanes.

=== Regulatory review ===
In 2015, the Australian Government's Department of Health published the results of a review of alternative therapies that sought to determine if any were suitable for being covered by health insurance; herbalism was one of 17 topics evaluated for which no clear evidence of effectiveness was found. Establishing guidelines to assess the safety and efficacy of herbal products, the European Medicines Agency provided criteria in 2017 for evaluating and grading the quality of clinical research in preparing monographs about herbal products. In the United States, the National Center for Complementary and Integrative Health of the National Institutes of Health funds clinical trials on herbal compounds, provides fact sheets evaluating the safety, potential effectiveness and side effects of many plant sources, and maintains a registry of clinical research conducted on herbal products.

According to Cancer Research UK as of 2015, "there is currently no strong evidence from studies in people that herbal remedies can treat, prevent or cure cancer".

=== Prevalence of use ===
The use of herbal remedies is more prevalent in people with chronic diseases, such as cancer, diabetes, asthma, and end-stage kidney disease. Multiple factors such as gender, age, ethnicity, education and social class are also shown to have associations with the prevalence of herbal remedy use.

=== Herbal preparations ===
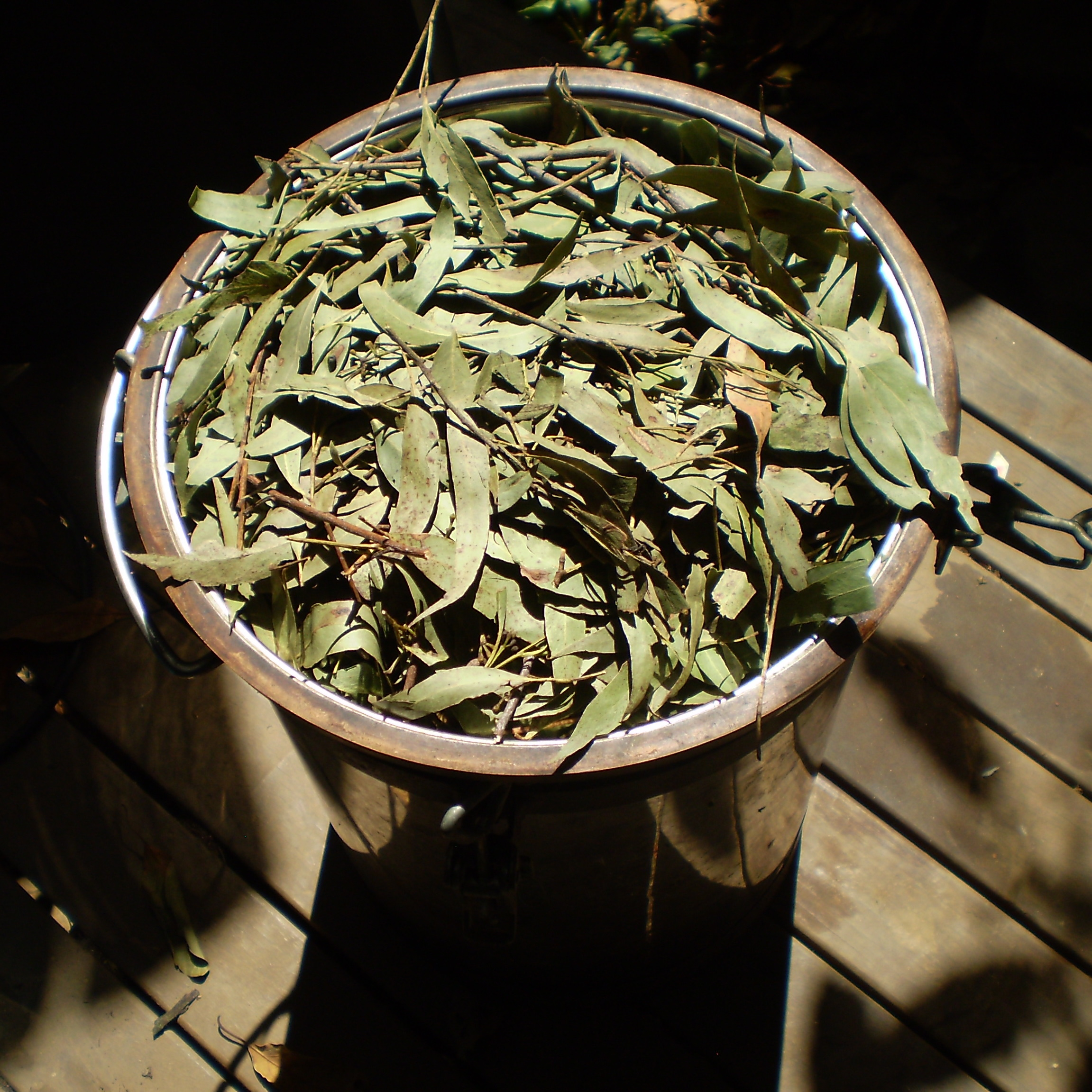
Leaves of Eucalyptus olida being packed into a steam distillation unit to gather its essential oil

There are many forms in which herbs can be administered, the most common of which is a liquid consumed as a herbal tea or a (possibly diluted) plant extract.

Herbal teas, or tisanes, are the resultant liquid of extracting herbs into water, though they are made in a few different ways. Infusions are hot water extracts of herbs, such as chamomile or mint, through steeping. Decoctions are the long-term boiled extracts, usually of harder substances like roots or bark. Maceration is the cold infusion of plants with high mucilage-content, such as sage or thyme. To make macerates, plants are chopped and added to cold water. They are left to stand for 7 to 12 hours (depending on the herb used). For most macerates, 10 hours is used.

Tinctures are alcoholic extracts of herbs, which are generally stronger than herbal teas. Tinctures are usually obtained by combining pure ethanol (or a mixture of pure ethanol with water) with the herb. A completed tincture has an ethanol percentage of at least 25% (sometimes up to 90%). Non-alcoholic tinctures can be made with glycerin, but it is believed to be less absorbed by the body than alcohol based tinctures and has a shorter shelf life. Herbal wine and elixirs are alcoholic extracts of herbs, usually with an ethanol percentage of 12–38%. Extracts include liquid extracts, dry extracts, and nebulisates. Liquid extracts are liquids with a lower ethanol percentage than tinctures. They are usually made by vacuum distilling tinctures. Dry extracts are extracts of plant material that are evaporated into a dry mass. They can then be further refined to a capsule or tablet.

The exact composition of a herbal product is influenced by the extraction method. A tea will be rich in polar components because water is a polar solvent. Oil, on the other hand, is a non-polar solvent and it will absorb non-polar compounds. Alcohol lies somewhere in between.

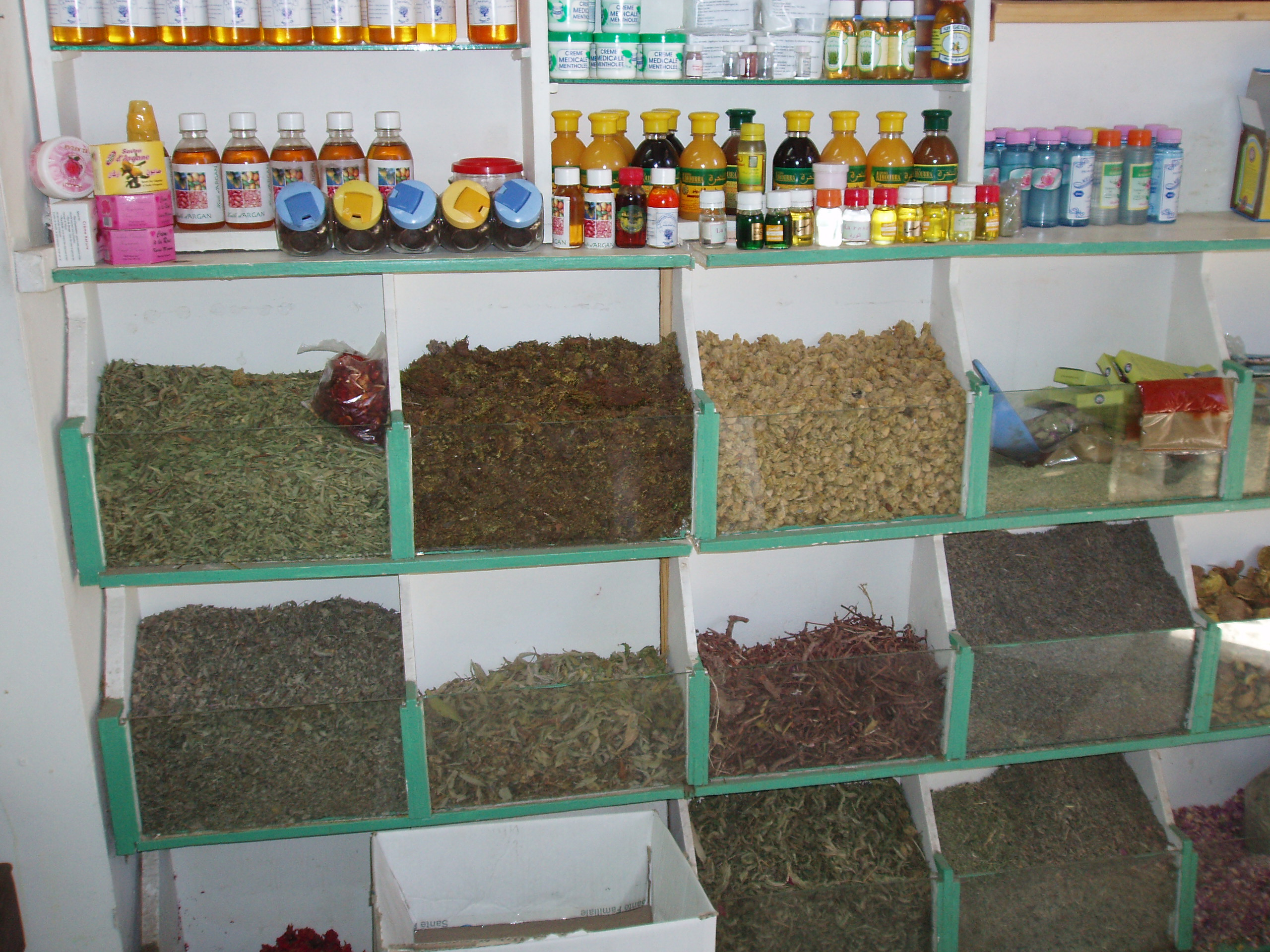
A herb shop in the souk of Marrakesh, Morocco

Many herbs are applied topically to the skin in a variety of forms. Essential oil extracts can be applied to the skin, usually diluted in a carrier oil. Many essential oils can burn the skin or are simply too high dose used straight; diluting them in olive oil or another food grade oil such as almond oil can allow these to be used safely as a topical. Salves, oils, balms, creams, and lotions are other forms of topical delivery mechanisms. Most topical applications are oil extractions of herbs. Taking a food-grade oil and soaking herbs in it for anywhere from weeks to months allows certain phytochemicals to be extracted into the oil. This oil can then be made into salves, creams, lotions, or simply used as an oil for topical application. Many massage oils, antibacterial salves, and wound healing compounds are made this way.

Inhalation, as in aromatherapy, can be used as a treatment.

=== Safety ===
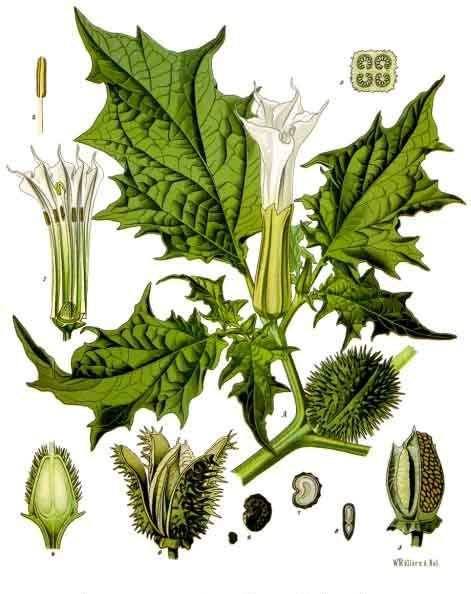
Datura stramonium has been used in Ayurveda for various treatments, but contains alkaloids, such as atropine and scopolamine, which may cause severe toxicity.

It is a popular misconception that herbal medicines are safe and side-effect free. Consumption of herbs may cause adverse effects. Furthermore, "adulteration, inappropriate formulation, or lack of understanding of plant and drug interactions have led to adverse reactions that are sometimes life threatening or lethal." Proper double-blind clinical trials are needed to determine the safety and efficacy of each plant before medical use.

Although many consumers believe that herbal medicines are safe because they are natural, herbal medicines and synthetic drugs may interact, causing toxicity to the consumer. Herbal remedies can also be dangerously contaminated, and herbal medicines without established efficacy, may unknowingly be used to replace prescription medicines.

Standardization of purity and dosage is not mandated in the United States, but even products made to the same specification may differ as a result of biochemical variations within a species of plant. Plants have chemical defense mechanisms against predators that can have adverse or lethal effects on humans. Examples of highly toxic herbs include poison hemlock and nightshade. They are not marketed to the public as herbs, because the risks are well known, partly due to a long and colorful history in Europe, associated with "sorcery", "magic" and intrigue.

Although not frequent, adverse reactions have been reported for herbs in widespread use. On occasion serious untoward outcomes have been linked to herb consumption. A case of major potassium depletion has been attributed to chronic licorice ingestion, and consequently professional herbalists avoid the use of licorice where they recognize that this may be a risk. Black cohosh has been implicated in a case of liver failure. Few studies are available on the safety of herbs for pregnant women, and one study found that use of complementary and alternative medicines is associated with a 30% lower ongoing pregnancy and live birth rate during fertility treatment.

Examples of herbal treatments with likely cause-effect relationships with adverse events include aconite (which is often a legally restricted herb), Ayurvedic remedies, broom, chaparral, Chinese herb mixtures, comfrey, herbs containing certain flavonoids, germander, guar gum, liquorice root, and pennyroyal. Examples of herbs that may have long-term adverse effects include ginseng, the endangered herb goldenseal, milk thistle, senna, aloe vera juice, buckthorn bark and berry, cascara sagrada bark, saw palmetto, valerian, kava (which is banned in the European Union), St. John's wort, khat, betel nut, the restricted herb ephedra, and guarana.

There is also concern with respect to the numerous well-established interactions of herbs and drugs. In consultation with a physician, usage of herbal remedies should be clarified, as some herbal remedies have the potential to cause adverse drug interactions when used in combination with various prescription and over-the-counter pharmaceuticals, just as a customer should inform a herbalist of their consumption of actual prescription and other medication.

For example, dangerously low blood pressure may result from the combination of a herbal remedy that lowers blood pressure together with prescription medicine that has the same effect. Some herbs may amplify the effects of anticoagulants. Certain herbs as well as common fruit interfere with cytochrome P450, an enzyme critical to much drug metabolism.

In a 2018 study, the FDA identified active pharmaceutical additives in over 700 analyzed dietary supplements sold as "herbal", "natural" or "traditional". The undisclosed additives included "unapproved antidepressants and designer steroids", as well as prescription drugs, such as sildenafil or sibutramine.

=== Labeling accuracy ===
Researchers at the University of Adelaide found in 2014 that almost 20 percent of herbal remedies surveyed were not registered with the Therapeutic Goods Administration, despite this being a condition for their sale. They also found that nearly 60 percent of products surveyed had ingredients that did not match what was on the label. Out of 121 products, only 15 had ingredients that matched their TGA listing and packaging.

In 2015, the New York Attorney General issued cease and desist letters to four major US retailers (GNC, Target, Walgreens, and Walmart) who were accused of selling herbal supplements that were mislabeled and potentially dangerous. Twenty-four products were tested by DNA barcoding as part of the investigation, with all but five containing DNA that did not match the product labels.

=== Practitioners of herbalism ===
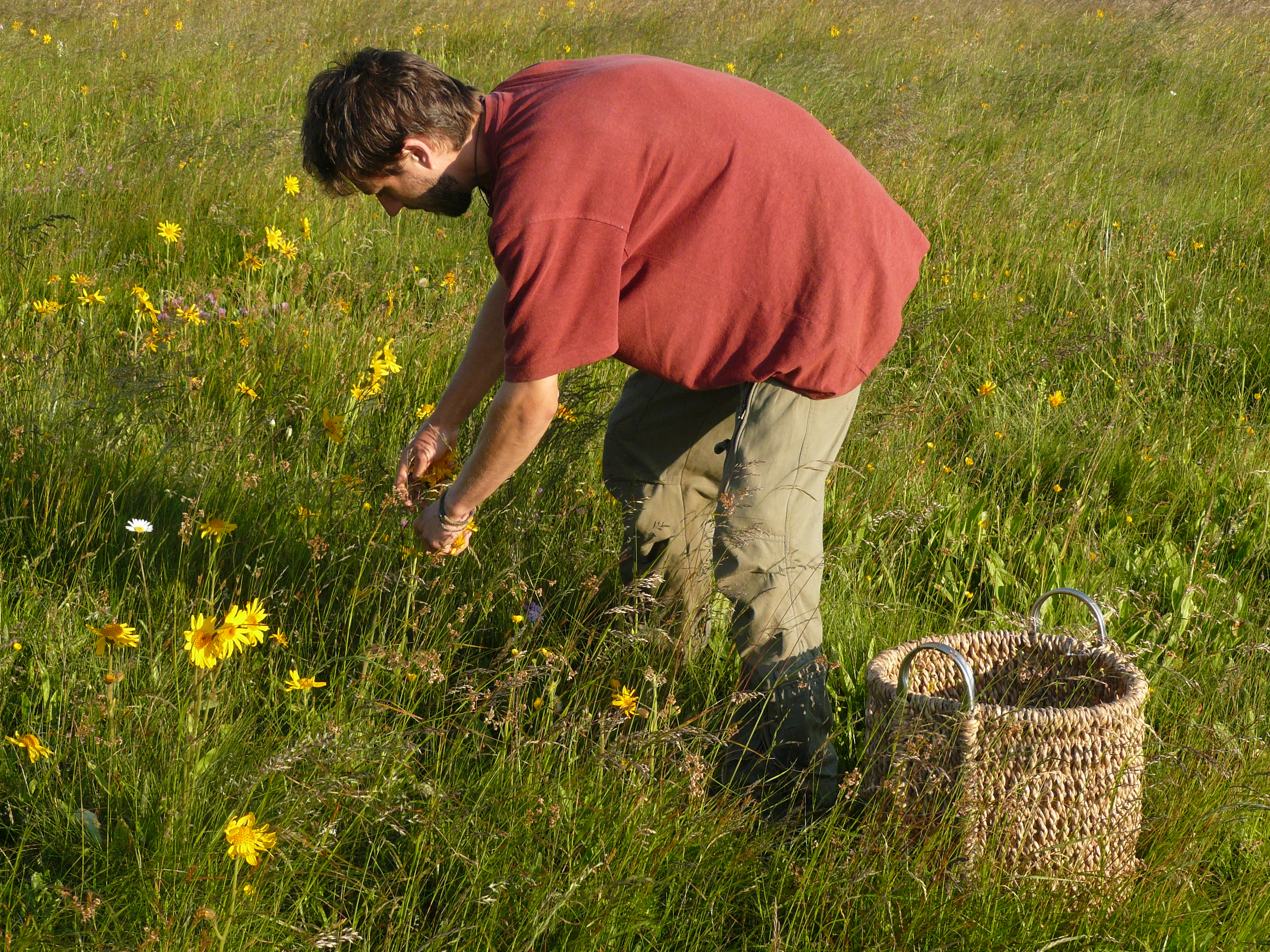
A herbalist gathers the flower heads of Arnica montana.

In some countries, formalized training and minimum education standards exist for herbalists, although these are not necessarily uniform within or between countries. In Australia, for example, the self-regulated status of the profession (as of 2009) resulted in variable standards of training, and numerous loosely formed associations setting different educational standards. One 2009 review concluded that regulation of herbalists in Australia was needed to reduce the risk of interaction of herbal medicines with prescription drugs, to implement clinical guidelines and prescription of herbal products, and to assure self-regulation for protection of public health and safety. In the United Kingdom, the training of herbalists is done by state-funded universities offering Bachelor of Science degrees in herbal medicine. In the United States, according to the American Herbalist Guild, "there is currently no licensing or certification for herbalists in any state that precludes the rights of anyone to use, dispense, or recommend herbs." However, there are U.S. federal restrictions for marketing herbs as products intended to cure, mitigate, treat, or prevent disease.

=== United States herbalism fraud ===
Over the years 2017–2021, the US Food and Drug Administration (FDA) issued warning letters to numerous herbalism companies for illegally marketing products under "conditions that cause them to be drugs under section 201(g)(1) of the Act [21 U.S.C. § 321(g)(1)], because they are intended for use in the diagnosis, cure, mitigation, treatment, or prevention of disease and/or intended to affect the structure or any function of the body" when no such evidence existed. During the COVID-19 pandemic, the FDA and US Federal Trade Commission issued warnings to several hundred American companies for promoting false claims that herbal products could prevent or treat COVID-19 disease.

=== Government regulations ===
The World Health Organization (WHO), the specialized agency of the United Nations (UN) that is concerned with international public health, published Quality control methods for medicinal plant materials in 1998 to support WHO Member States in establishing quality standards and specifications for herbal materials, within the overall context of quality assurance and control of herbal medicines.

In the European Union (EU), herbal medicines are regulated under the Committee on Herbal Medicinal Products.

In the United States, herbal remedies are regulated dietary supplements by the Food and Drug Administration (FDA) under current good manufacturing practice (cGMP) policy for dietary supplements. Manufacturers of products falling into this category are not required to prove the safety or efficacy of their product so long as they do not make 'medical' claims or imply uses other than as a 'dietary supplement', though the FDA may withdraw a product from sale should it prove harmful.

Canadian regulations are described by the Natural and Non-prescription Health Products Directorate which requires an eight-digit Natural Product Number or Homeopathic Medicine Number on the label of licensed herbal medicines or dietary supplements.

Some herbs, such as cannabis and coca, are outright banned in most countries though coca is legal in most of the South American countries where it is grown. The Cannabis plant is used as a herbal medicine, and as such is legal in some parts of the world. Since 2004, the sales of ephedra as a dietary supplement is prohibited in the United States by the FDA, and subject to Schedule III restrictions in the United Kingdom.

=== Scientific criticism ===
Herbalism has been criticized as a potential "minefield" of unreliable product quality, safety hazards, and the potential for misleading health advice. Globally, there are no uniform standards across various herbal products to authenticate their contents, safety or efficacy, and there is generally an absence of high-quality scientific research on product composition or effectiveness for anti-disease activity. Presumed claims of therapeutic benefit from herbal products, without rigorous evidence of efficacy and safety, receive skeptical views by scientists.

Unethical practices by some herbalists and manufacturers, which may include false advertising about health benefits on product labels or literature, and contamination or use of fillers during product preparation, may erode consumer confidence about services and products.

== Paraherbalism ==
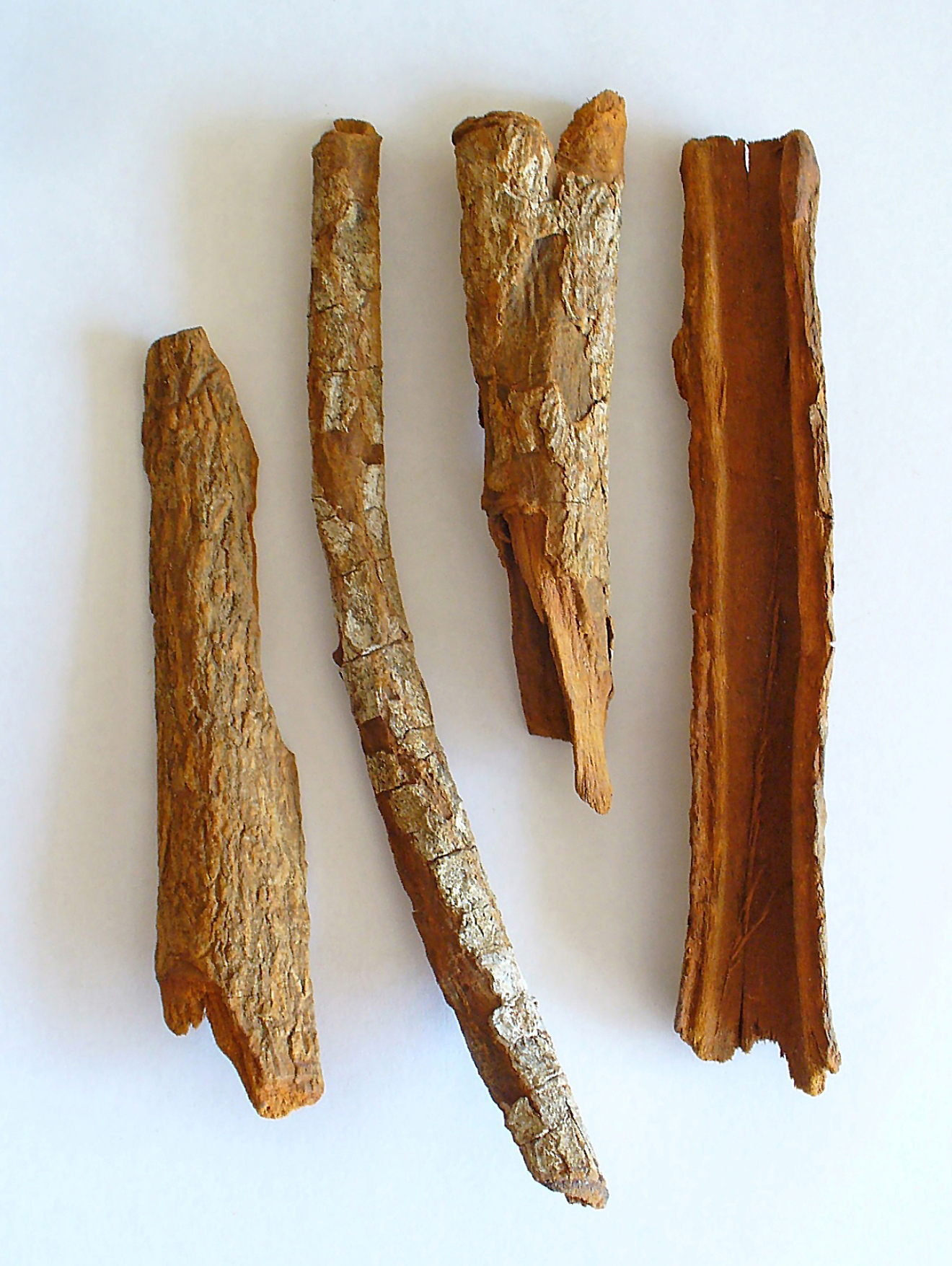
An example of a herbal medicine resource: the bark of the cinchona tree contains quinine, which today is a widely prescribed treatment for malaria. The unpurified bark is still used by some who cannot afford to purchase more expensive antimalarial drugs.

Paraherbalism is the pseudoscientific use of extracts of plant or animal origin as supposed medicines or health-promoting agents. Phytotherapy differs from plant-derived medicines in standard pharmacology because it does not isolate and standardize the compounds from a given plant believed to be biologically active. It relies on the false belief that preserving the complexity of substances from a given plant with less processing is safer and potentially more effective, for which there is no evidence either condition applies.

Phytochemical researcher Varro Eugene Tyler described paraherbalism as "faulty or inferior herbalism based on pseudoscience", using scientific terminology but lacking scientific evidence for safety and efficacy. Tyler listed ten fallacies that distinguished herbalism from paraherbalism, including claims that there is a conspiracy to suppress safe and effective herbs, herbs cannot cause harm, whole herbs are more effective than molecules isolated from the plants, herbs are superior to drugs, the doctrine of signatures (the belief that the shape of the plant indicates its function) is valid, dilution of substances increases their potency (a doctrine of the pseudoscience of homeopathy), astrological alignments are significant, animal testing is not appropriate to indicate human effects, anecdotal evidence is an effective means of proving a substance works and herbs were created by God to cure disease. Tyler suggests that none of these beliefs have any basis in fact.

== Traditional systems ==
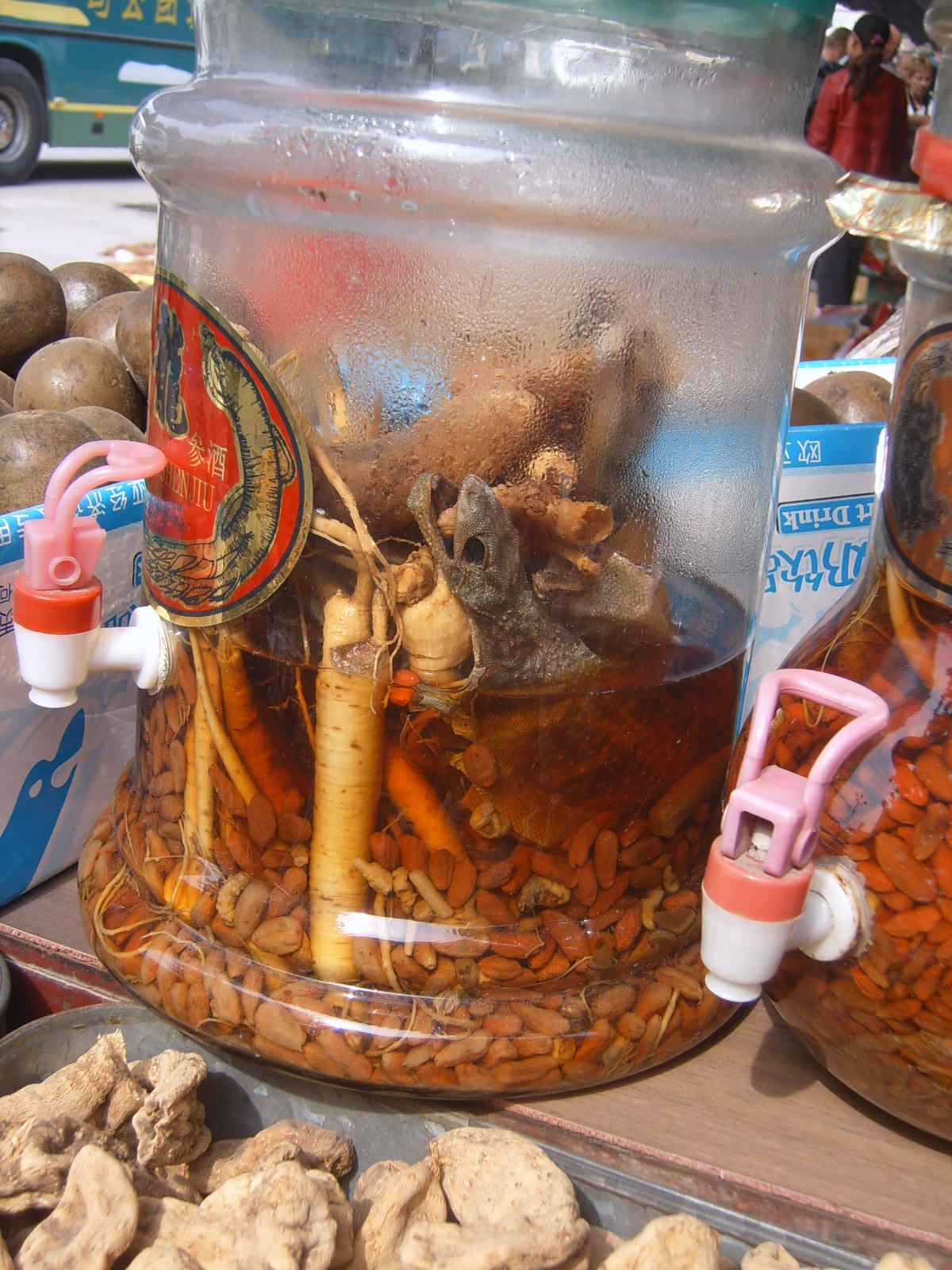
Ready to drink macerated medicinal liquor with goji berry, tokay gecko, and ginseng, for sale at a traditional medicine market in Xi'an, China

=== Africa ===
Up to 80% of the population in Africa uses traditional medicine as primary health care.

=== Americas ===
Native Americans used about 2,500 of the approximately 20,000 plant species that are native to North America.

In Andean healing practices, the use of entheogens, in particular the San Pedro cactus (Echinopsis pachanoi) is still a vital component, and has been around for millennia.

=== Asia ===
==== China ====
Some researchers trained in both Western and traditional Chinese medicine have attempted to deconstruct ancient medical texts in the light of modern science. In 1972, Tu Youyou, a pharmaceutical chemist and Nobel Prize winner, extracted the anti-malarial drug artemisinin from sweet wormwood, a traditional Chinese treatment for intermittent fevers.

==== India ====
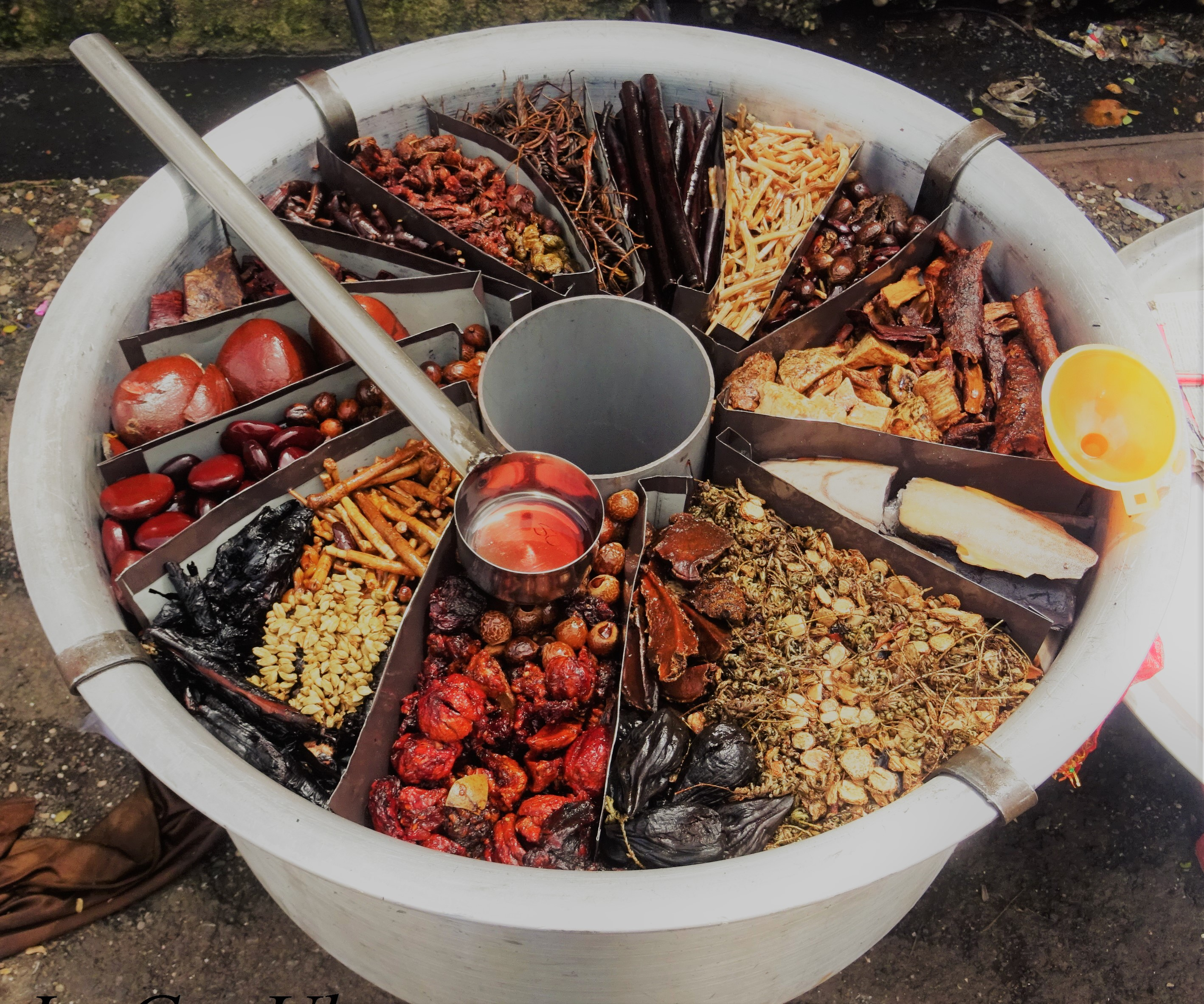
A platter of herbal medicines at Goa, India

In India, Ayurvedic medicine has quite complex formulas with 30 or more ingredients, including a sizable number of ingredients that have undergone "alchemical processing", chosen to balance dosha. In Ladakh, Lahul-Spiti, and Tibet, the Tibetan Medical System is prevalent, also called the "Amichi Medical System". Over 337 species of medicinal plants have been documented by C.P. Kala. Those are used by Amchis, the practitioners of this medical system. The Indian book, Vedas, mentions treatment of diseases with plants.

==== Indonesia ====
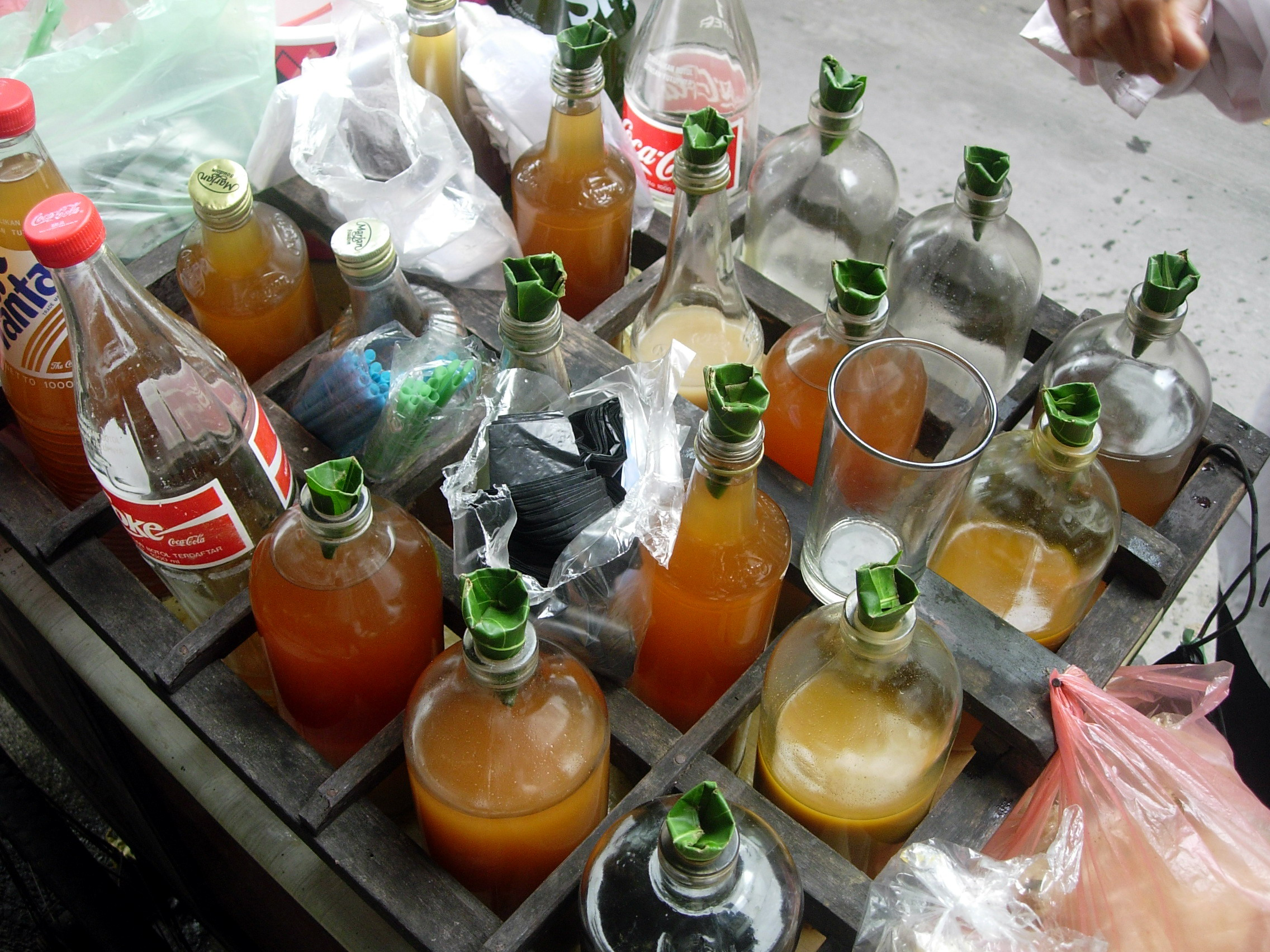
Different types of Indonesian jamu herbal medicines held in bottles

In Indonesia, especially among the Javanese, the jamu traditional herbal medicine may have originated in the Mataram kingdom era, some 1300 years ago. The bas-reliefs on Borobudur depict the image of people grinding herbs with stone mortar and pestle, a drink seller, a herbalist, and masseuse treating people. The Madhawapura inscription from Majapahit period mentioned a specific profession of herb mixer and combiner (herbalist), called Acaraki. The book from Mataram dated from circa 1700 contains 3,000 entries of jamu herbal recipes, while Javanese classical literature Serat Centhini (1814) describes some jamu herbal concoction recipes.

Though possibly influenced by Indian Ayurveda systems, the Indonesia archipelago holds numerous indigenous plants not found in India, including plants similar to those in Australia beyond the Wallace Line. Jamu practices may vary from region to region, and are often not recorded, especially in remote areas of the country. Although primarily herbal, some Jamu materials are acquired from animals, such as honey, royal jelly, milk, and Ayam Kampung eggs.

Thailand

There has been a backalley tonic nicknamed "Greek water" sold in Bangkok, which supposedly alleviates the symptoms of gout and is reputedly a mixture of ginger beer with convallaria.

== Beliefs ==
Herbalists tend to use extracts from parts of plants, such as the roots or leaves, believing that plants are subject to environmental pressures and therefore develop resistance to threats such as radiation, reactive oxygen species and microbial attack to survive, providing defensive phytochemicals of use in herbalism.

== Use of plants by animals ==
Indigenous healers often claim to have learned by observing that sick animals change their food preferences to nibble at bitter herbs they would normally reject. Field biologists have provided corroborating evidence based on observation of diverse species, such as chickens, sheep, butterflies, and chimpanzees. The habit of changing diet has been shown to be a physical means of purging intestinal parasites. Sick animals tend to forage plants rich in secondary metabolites, such as tannins and alkaloids.

== See also ==
- Chinese herbology
- Ethnobotany
- Ethnomedicine
- Herbal
- Medicinal fungi
- List of plants used in herbalism
- Thomsonianism, a popular 19th century movement
- Traditional medicine
- Traditional Knowledge Digital Library
