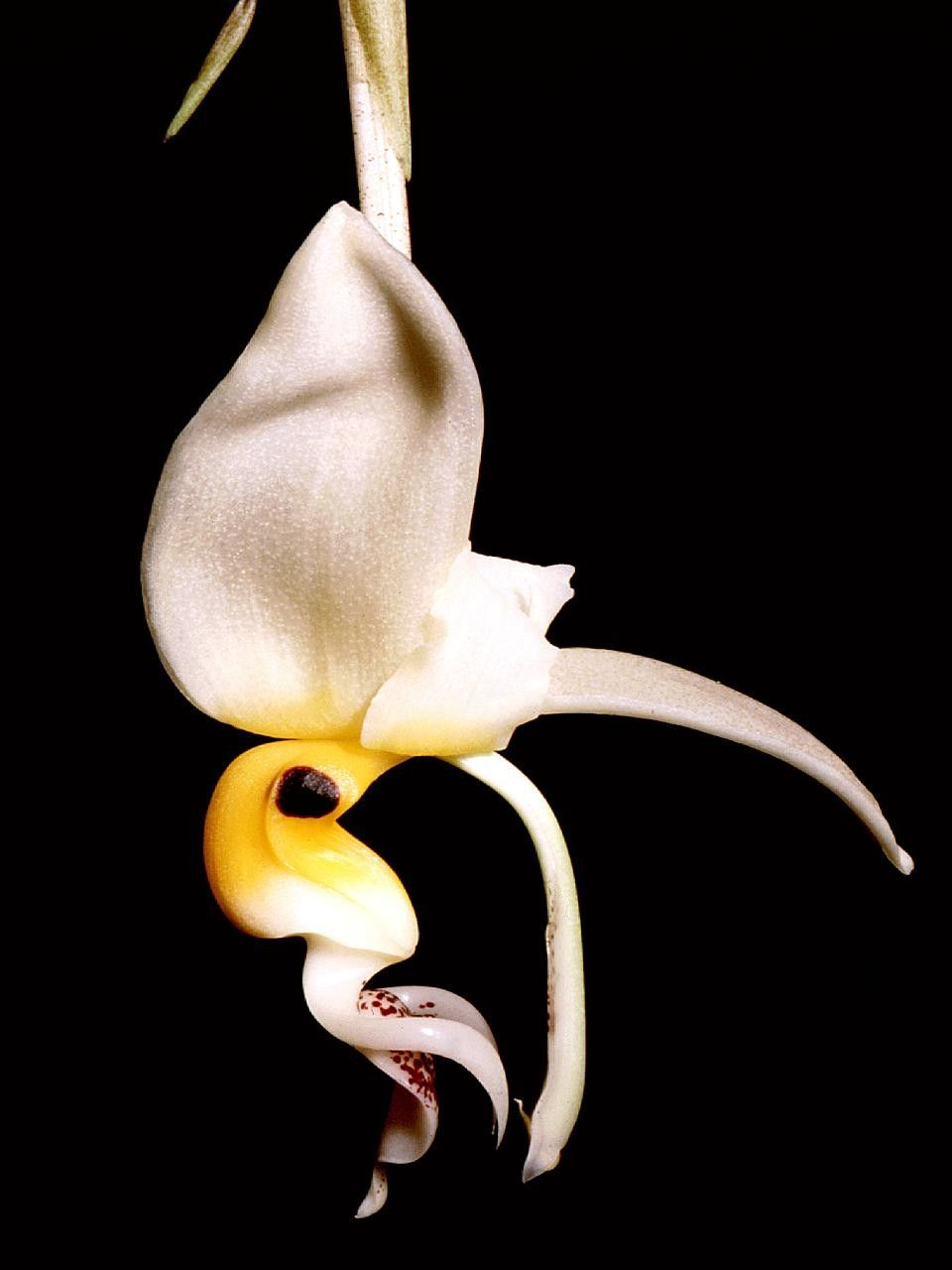
- Stanhopea embreei flower

Scientific classification
- Kingdom: Plantae
- Clade: Tracheophytes
- Clade: Angiosperms
- Clade: Monocots
- Order: Asparagales
- Family: Orchidaceae
- Subfamily: Epidendroideae
- Genus: Stanhopea
- Species: S. embreei

Binomial name
- Stanhopea embreei Dodson

= Stanhopea embreei =

Species of orchid

Stanhopea embreei is a species of orchid.

The classification of this species was published by Calaway H. Dodson in Selbyana, 1: 128. 1975. The original isotype was collected by Dodson.

Distribution: Cañar (Ecuador, Western South America, Southern America).

The holotype is kept at Systematic Entomology Laboratory (SEL).

Etymology: This species is named for Alvin Embree, an American orchidologist.

Molecular analysis by Whitten al. revealed the major chemical component of this species fragrance is trans-methyl cinnamate.

Closely related species are Stanhopea frymirei & Stanhopea jenischiana based on molecular data.

== Gallery ==
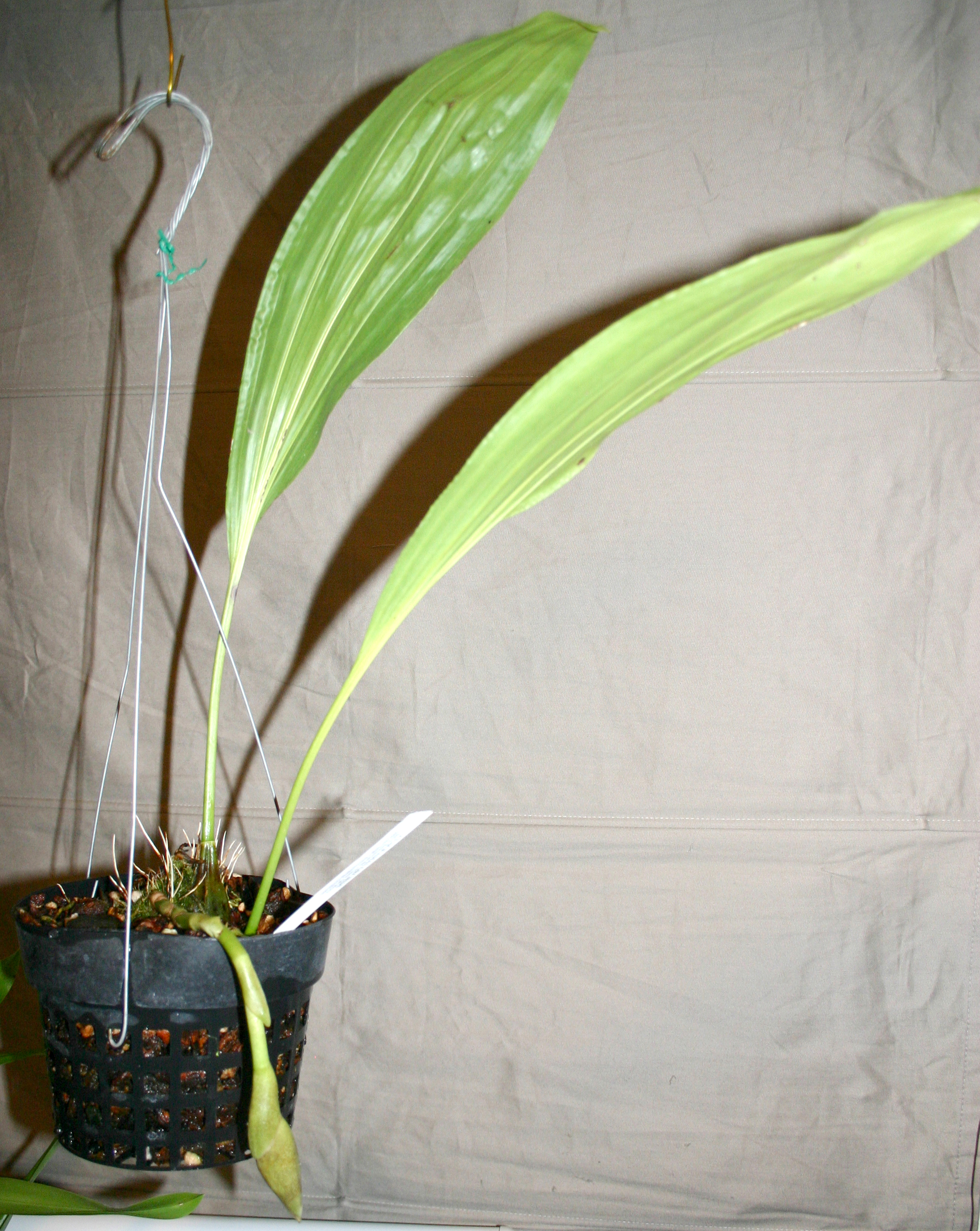
Stan. embreei
in spike

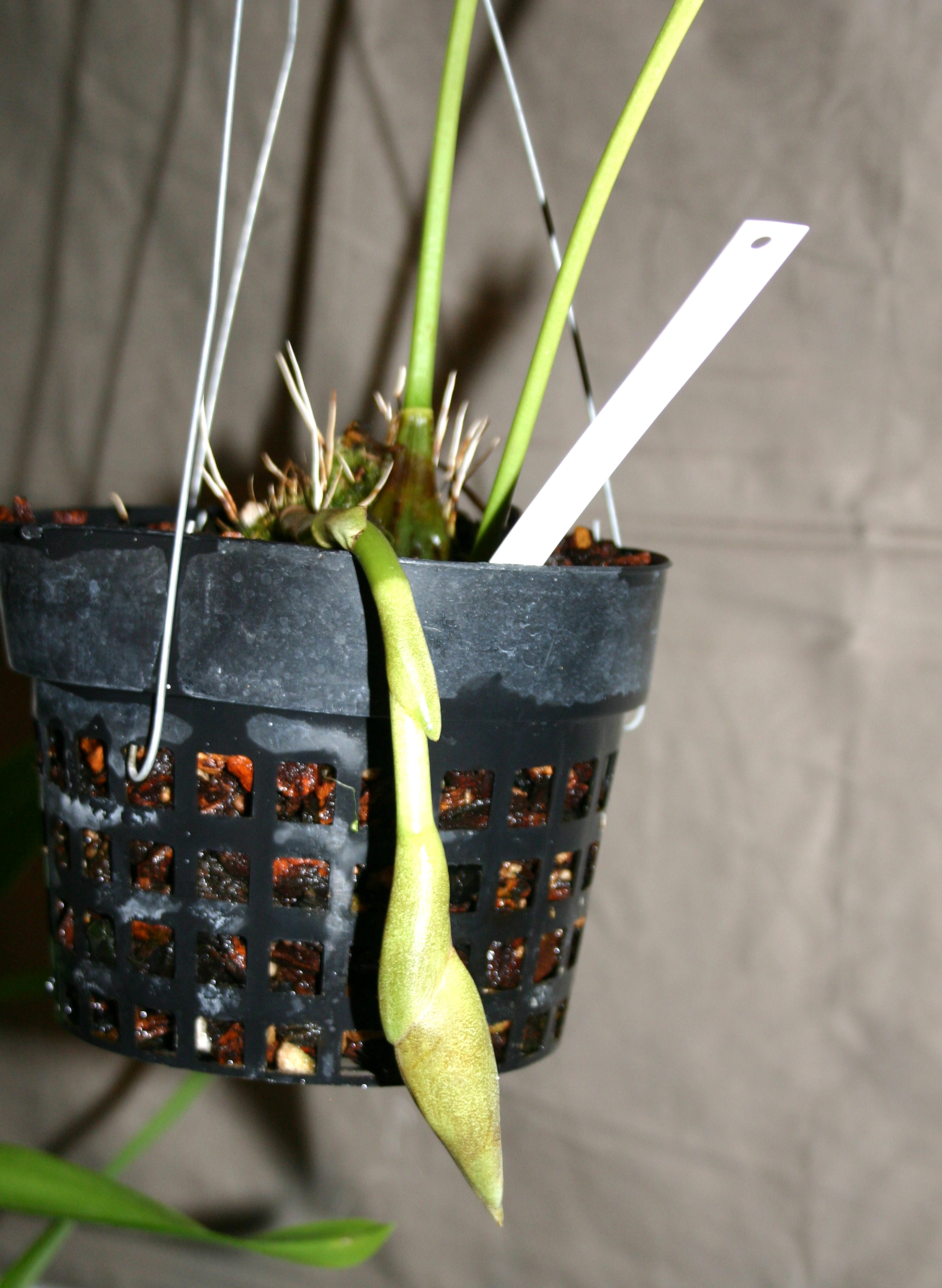
Stan. embreei
developing inflorescence

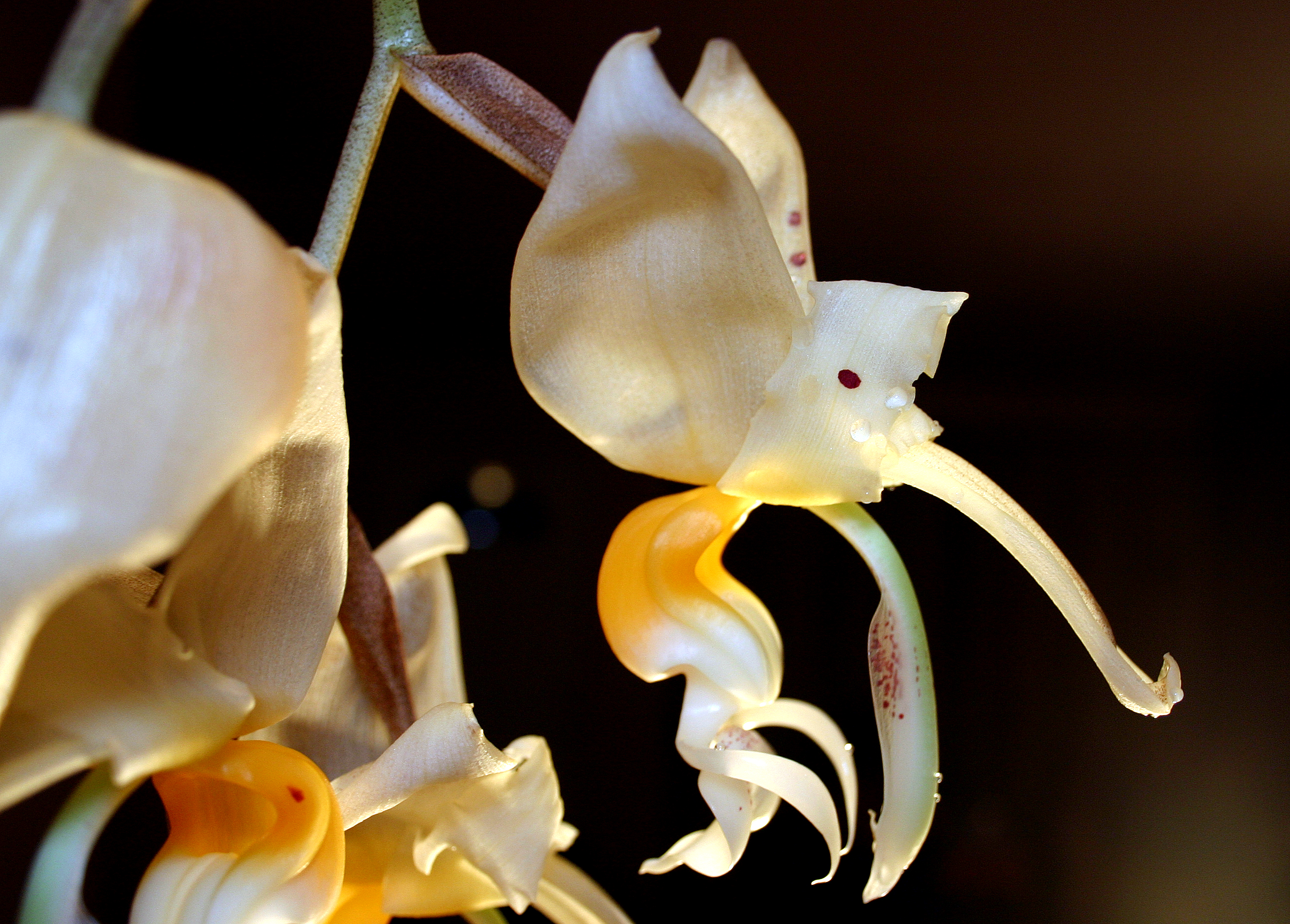
Stan. embreei
flower

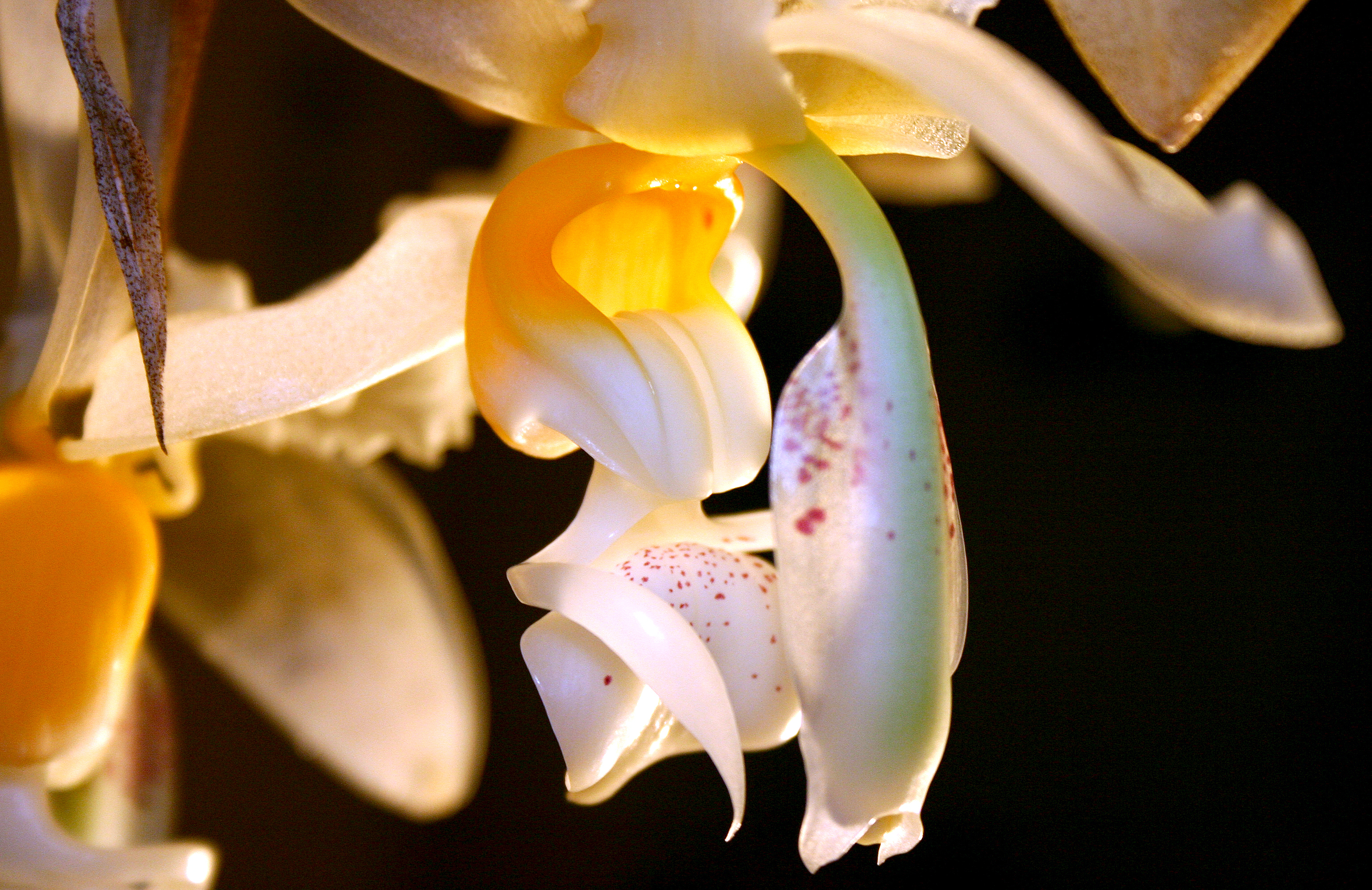
Stan. embreei
detail view of labellum and column

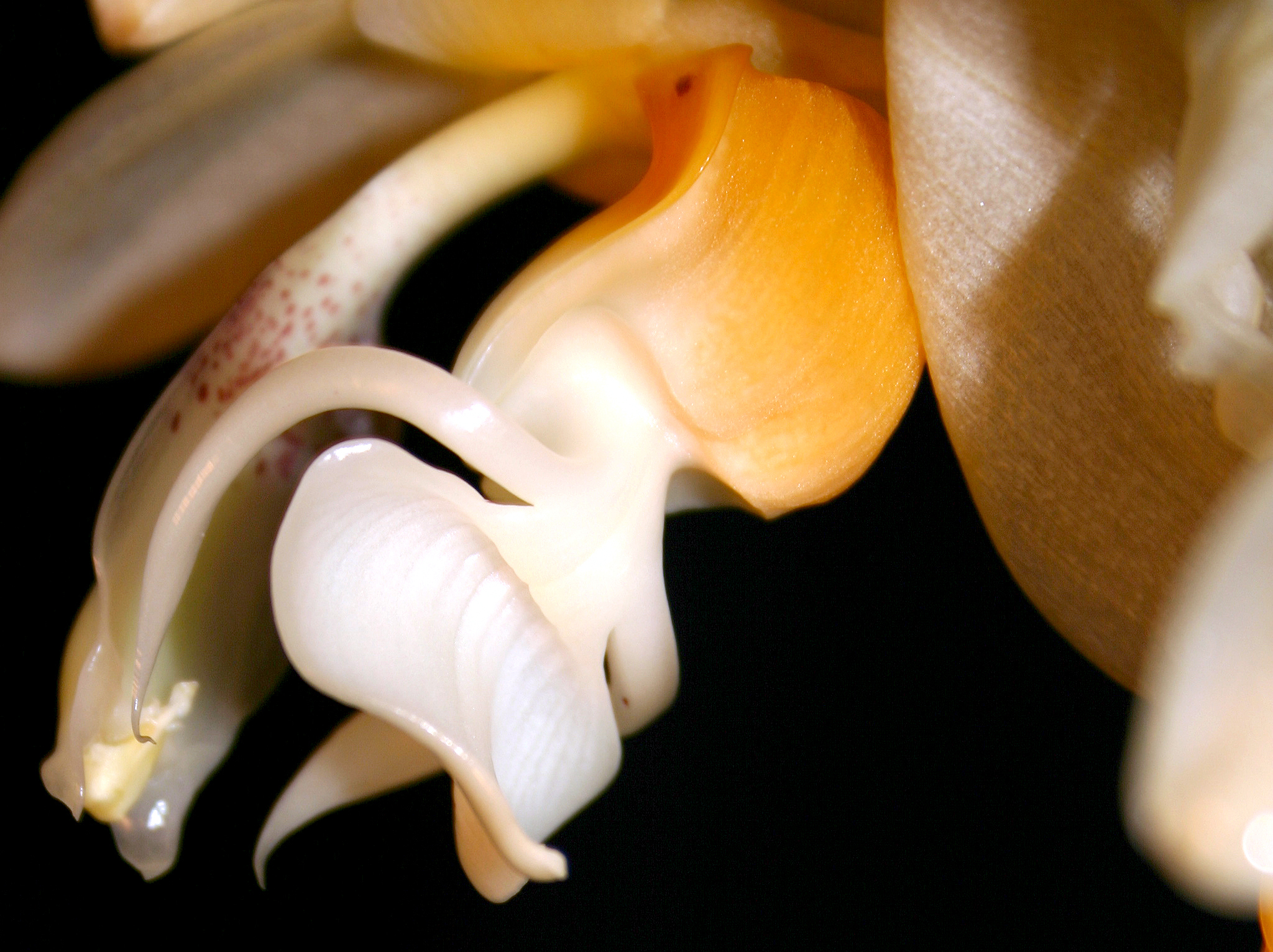
Stan. embreei
back view of labellum
