= Samuel Thomson =

American herbalist

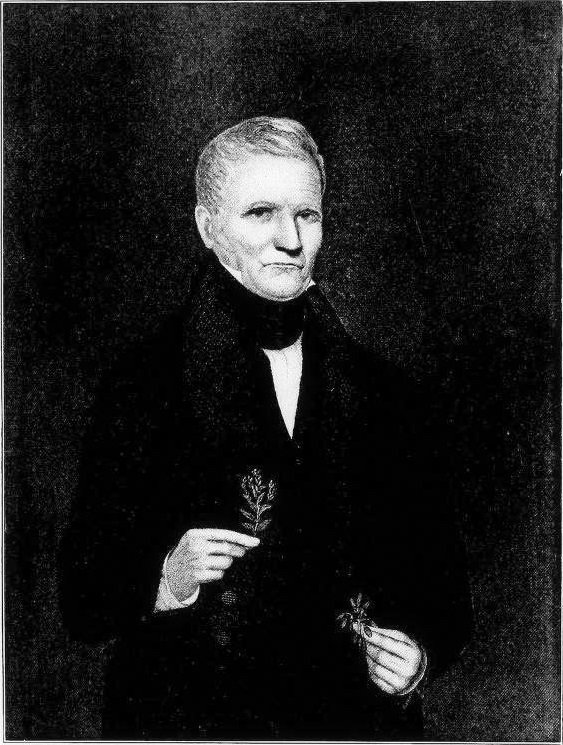
Illustration of Samuel Thomson published in a 1909 book, based on an earlier painting by an anonymous artist.

Samuel Thomson (9 February 1769 – 5 October 1843) was a self-taught American herbalist and botanist, best known as the founder of the alternative system of medicine known as "Thomsonian Medicine" or "Thomsonianism", which enjoyed wide popularity in the United States during the early 19th century.

== Early life ==
Thomson was born in Alstead, New Hampshire, the second-eldest of six children. His father, John Thomson, was a farmer and the family lived in a remote country area which Thomson described as a "wilderness". Both of his parents were Unitarians.

From a young age he became curious about various plants and their medicinal uses. Much of his early knowledge was acquired from a local widow who had acquired a reputation as a healer by applying herbal remedies. Thomson also used to sample the plants he found growing in the wild, including Lobelia which became important in the system of medicine he later founded. Unaware at first of the medicinal properties of the plant, Thomson used to trick other boys into eating it, which caused them to vomit because of the leaves' emetic effect.

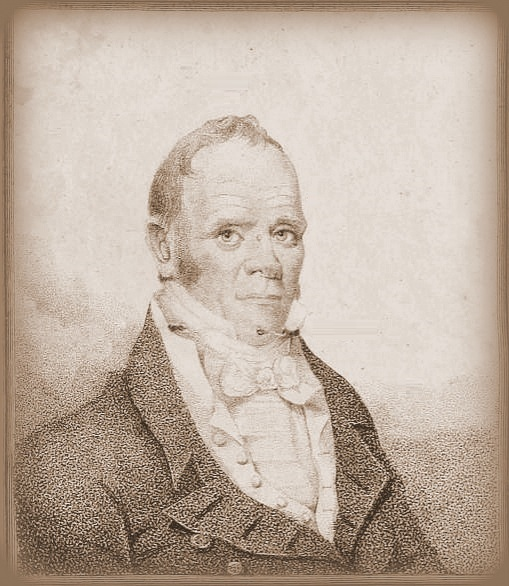
A contemporary illustration of Thomson from a book published at Boston in 1822.

At the age of sixteen he had hoped to study with a local "root" doctor (at that time there was no official licensing of the medical profession) but his parents did not think he had the education and could not spare him from his work. Thus, he became resigned to his life as a farm laborer. At the age of nineteen, while he was chopping wood, his ankle sustained a severe injury which, despite the ministration of a local doctor, refused to heal. His condition worsened and the family feared for his life. He decided to treat the wound himself with a comfrey root and turpentine plaster—after some weeks he was able to make a recovery.

At the age of 21, Samuel's father left for Vermont, placing Samuel in charge of the farm and leaving his mother and sister in his care. Soon after, his mother became ill with measles, and in spite of the efforts of several doctors, Samuel's mother died when the measles turned into "galloping consumption". When Samuel also became ill with measles, he cured himself using herbal remedies.

One year later, Thomson married Susanna Allen on July 7, 1790, in Keene, New Hampshire. After the birth of their first child, Susanna became very ill, and a parade of seven conventional doctors were unable to cure her. Samuel arranged for two "root doctors" to treat his wife, who returned to health the next day. Thomson and Susanna went on to have eight children.

== Development of the Thomsonian System ==
During his wife's illness, Thomson consulted two herbalists, who treated his wife and taught Thomson some of their methods. Subsequently, Thomson used steam baths and herbs to cure one of his daughters and a son, and a few of his neighbors.

In this way, Thomson developed his own method, the "Thomsonian System", and practiced in Surry, New Hampshire, and the adjoining towns. During the first half of the 19th century, his system had numerous followers, including some of his sons. It was based upon opening the paths of elimination so that toxins could be removed via physiological processes. This was not unique to Thomson: so-called "regular physicians" used calomel, a toxic mercury-based compound, to induce vomiting and purgation. Thomson's more moderate and less toxic means attracted large numbers of followers.

Displeased with the conventional medicines and enthusiastic about the results he had had by means of his system, he proposed it as a natural alternative, stating:

Much of what is at this day called medicine, is deadly poison, and were people to know what is offered them of this kind they would absolutely refuse ever to receive it as a medicine. This I have long seen and known to be true; and have laboured hard for many years to convince them of the evils that attend such a mode of procedure with the sick; and have turned my attention to those medicines that grow in our own country, which the God of nature has prepared for the benefit of mankind. Long has a general medicine been sought for, and I am confident I have found such as are universally applicable in all cases of disease, and which may be used with safety and success, in the hands of the people.
After thirty years study and repeated successful trials of the medicinal vegetables of our country, in all the diseases incident to our climate; I can, with well grounded assurance, recommend my system of practice and medicines to the public, as salutary and efficacious.

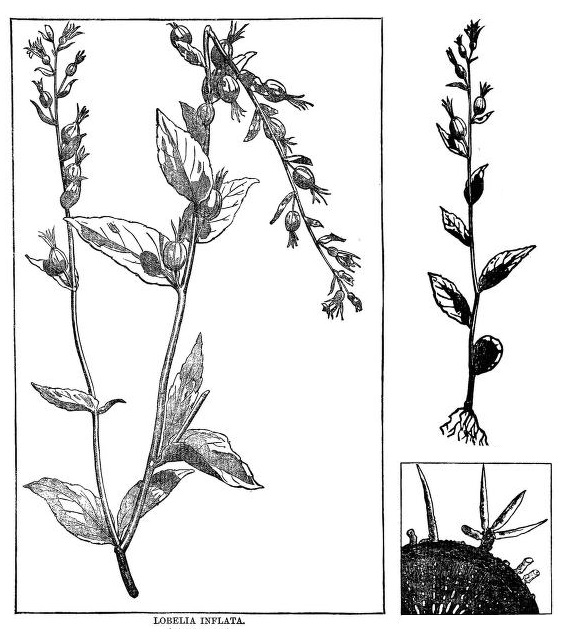
Lobelia plant, found in a biographical book about Thomson's work

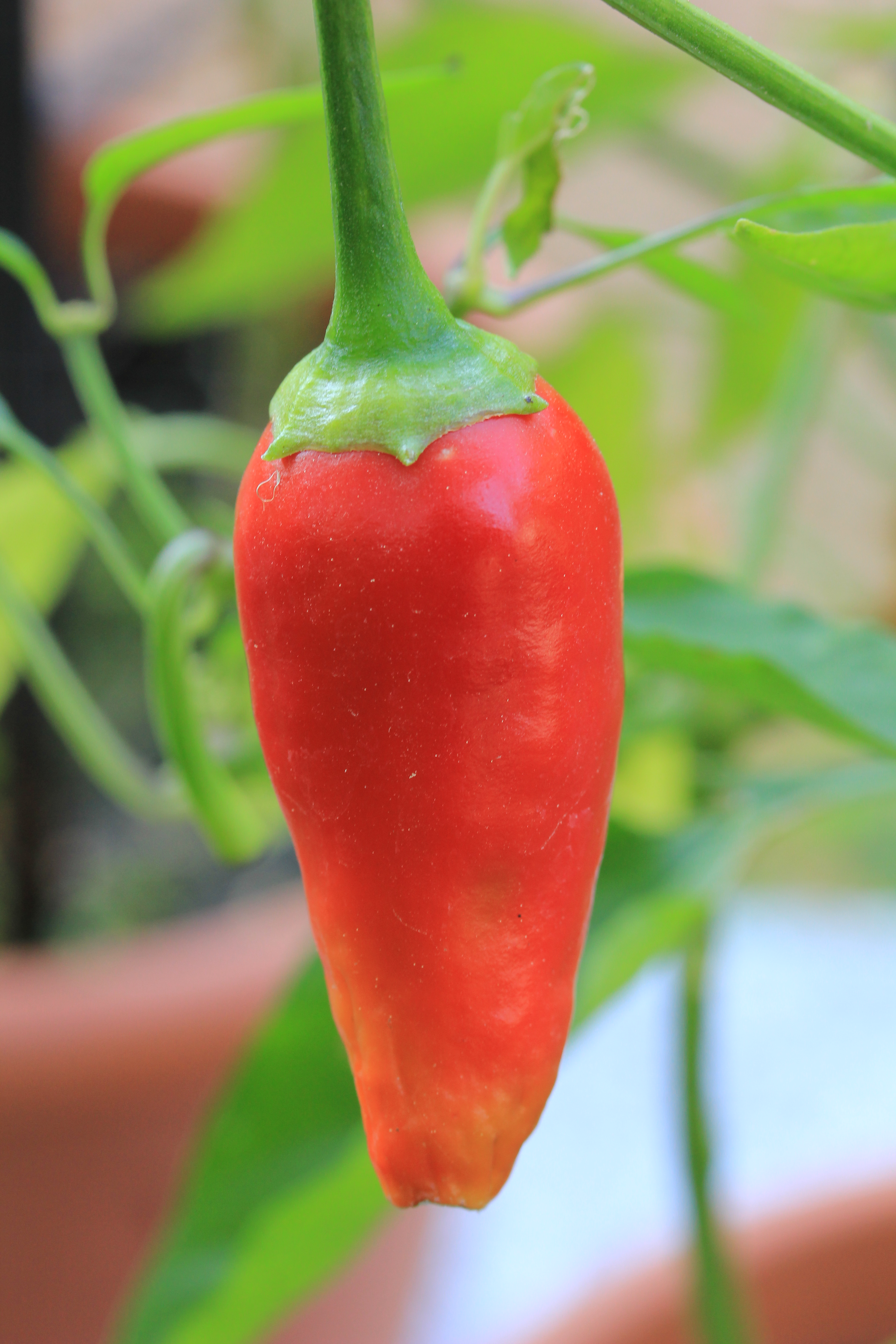
A large red cayenne pepper

Eventually, Thomson came to believe that the exposure to cold temperatures was an important cause of illness and that disease should be treated by restoring the body's natural heat. Thomson's methods for doing this included steam baths, the use of cayenne pepper, laxatives, and administration of the emetic Lobelia inflata (also known as "Indian tobacco" or "puke weed").

Thomson's book called New Guide to Health; or Botanic Family Physician (1822), suggested home-made preparations and contempt for conventional medicine which he regarded to be as very expensive:

One ounce of the emetic herb, two ounces of cayenne, one-half pound bay-berry root bark in powder, one pound poplar bark, one pint of the rheumatic drops. This stock will be sufficient for a family for one year, with such articles as they can easily procure themselves when wanted, and will enable them to cure any disease which a family of common size may be afflicted with during that time. The expenses will be small and much better than to employ a doctor, and have his extravagant bill to pay.

Moreover, his system of medicine appealed to the egalitarian anti-elitist sentiments of Jacksonian America in the 1830s, and families far from established towns came to rely on it. At that time, licensed doctors and many of their methods such as bloodletting came under intense scrutiny, so Thomson's innovative system was presented as an appealing alternative that allowed each individual (working classes included) to administer his or her own treatment using natural products. A favorable opinion of his system was given by the contemporary physician Daniel Drake, who perceived him as an American medical reformist:

It must be a matter of national pride, that if Germany produced a Luther and England a Bacon, America has sent up from its humblest walks, a self-taught and gifted Thomson, who has done for medicine what those eminent men achieved for religion and philosophy.

— Daniel Drake, The people's doctors: a review (1830)

Another opinion by botanist William Hance was given before the Botanic Society in Columbus, Ohio, where Hance said of him:

The science of medicine is confessed by the best men who have ever honored its splendid halls, or enlightened its mazy paths, to be in a very imperfect state; then why should we reject or condemn, without a close examination, a theory and practice merely because they are new or novel? There has been an almost continued succession of new and novel things, since the creation; and yet our knowledge as well as the improvement of our intellectual faculties remain very imperfect. I do not pretend to say, that Dr. Thomson's Theory or Practice of Medicine is in a state of perfection; but I do say and believe, that they approach nearer to this state than any other with which I am acquainted, or that I have reason to believe is known to, or practiced by, the Medical Faculty of America or Europe.

== Reception ==
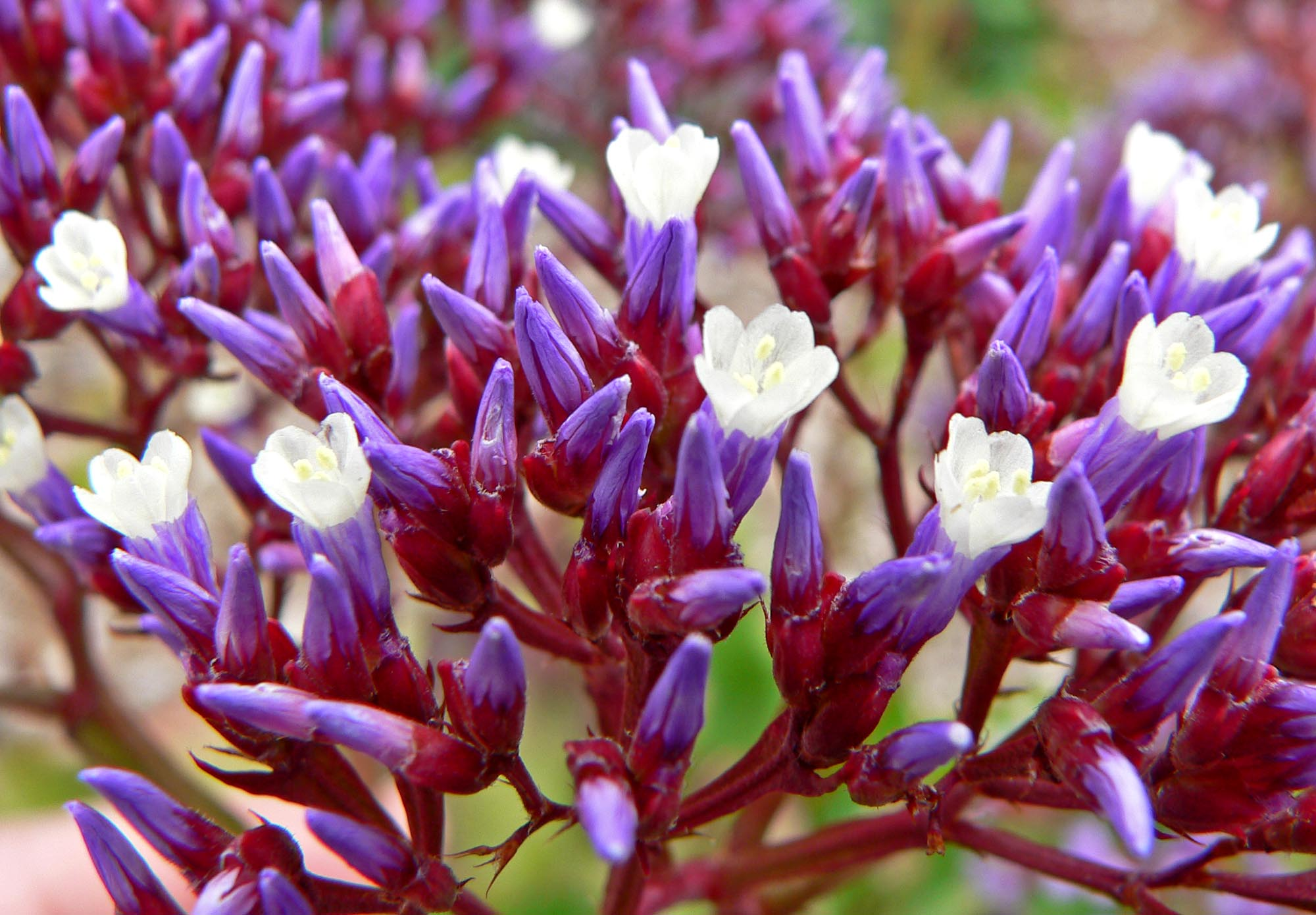
Marsh rosemary

Despite Thomson's popularity, some licensed doctors came to resent his work, and he was criticized for his techniques. On the one hand, some people who received his training broke with him and went on to pursue advanced medical education, founding physiomedicalism, while on the other hand, some of his former apprentices like Miler Comings, acknowledged him as an early great mentor. His detractors like John Brown accused him of lack of anatomical and physiological knowledge, and they attributed Thomson's downfall to a reluctance to interact more with doctors.

== Legalities and legal charges ==
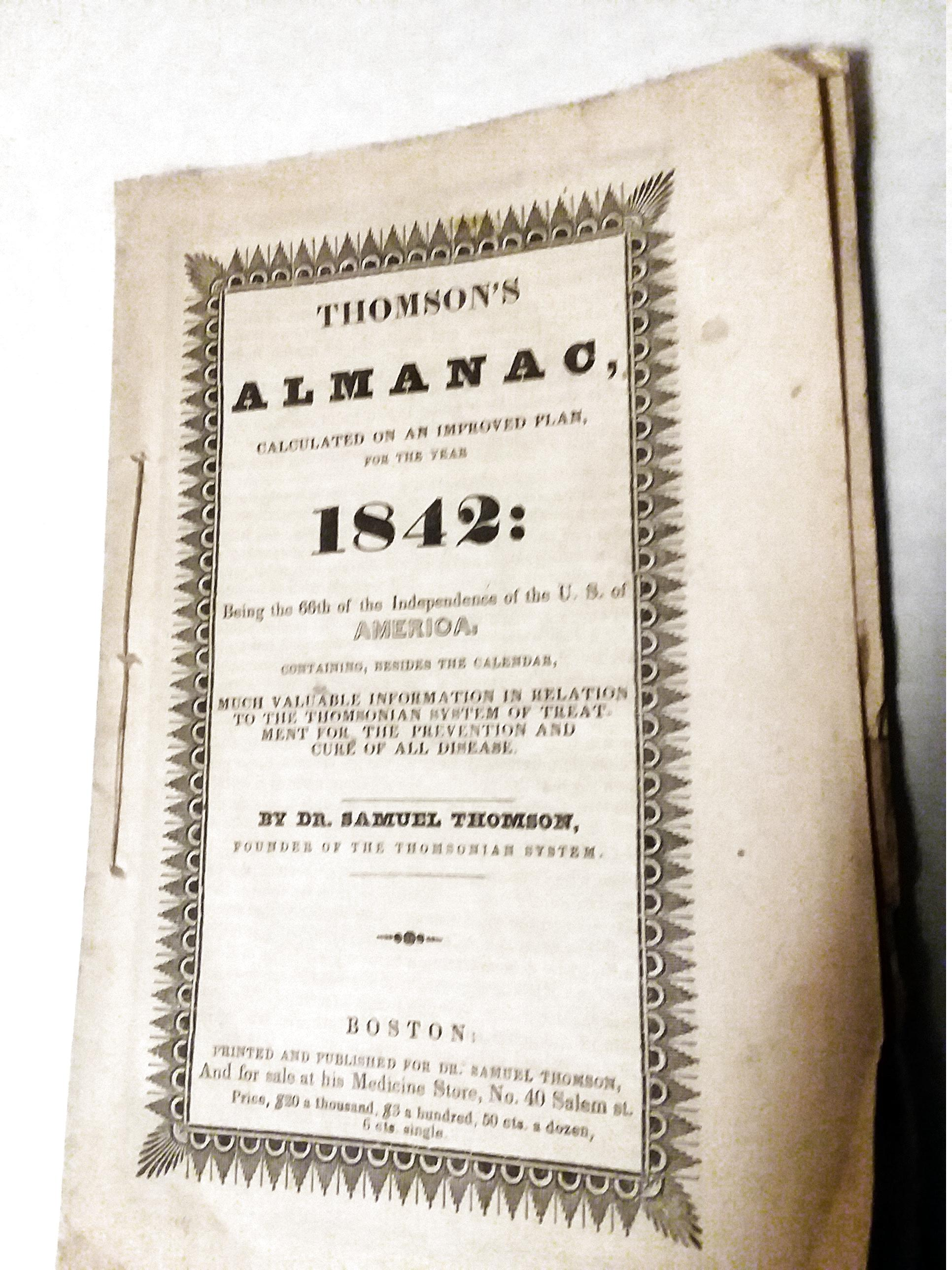
Thomson's almanac for 1842

In 1809, Thomson was accused of killing a patient, Ezra Lovett, through the administration of excessive amounts of Lobelia. He was legally charged by Lovett's father, but Thomson was acquitted when one of his defense counsel demonstrated that one of the prosecution's exhibits, labeled "Lobelia", was actually the plant marsh rosemary (Limonium), by consuming some in court. Also, the judge found no basis to establish Thomson's fault or negligence. Subsequent literature reviews have failed to demonstrate any deaths or symptoms more dangerous than emesis from even significantly larger doses than Thomson administered in the Ezra Lovett case; but, medical reviews about Thomson's trial were diverse at the time, sometimes very critical. Thomson, however, gave his own account of this case in two of his later books, where he wrote that first he had helped the young man get better, but after carelessness at home, he told the father to seek someone else, though the father refused:

I told the young man’s father, that it was very doubtful whether I could do any thing that would help him, but that I would try and do all I could. I found that the patient was so far gone that the medicine would have no effect, and in two hours told him that I could not help his son, and advised him to call some other advice; this was said in the presence of Elder Williams, and Mr. Raymond. Mr. Lovett made answer that if I could not help his son, he knew of none who could, and was very desirous for me to stay with him all night, which I did, and stood by his bed the whole time.

Nonetheless, and despite Thomson's acquittal, many states passed "Black Laws", restricting the practice of unconventional medicine. Black laws were labeled as such by unconventional medical practitioners as a way of comparing them with laws restricting African Americans from practicing medicine and engaging in other activities. The laws were of small practical effect and were mostly repealed by the 1820s. Thomson saw this as an attempt to destroy his personal career, as he had denounced some of the medical techniques of the time, in 1839, he wrote:

For more than twenty years the Faculty tried to destroy the Thomsonian system by holding it up as a quackery. In Massachusetts, they began in 1808 to get the Legislature to help them put me down, and in that State and many others, laws have been passed since that time to prevent my collecting my debts, and to make medical practice, without a college diploma, a crime. But in nearly every State where these unjust laws were passed, the people have caused them to be repealed.

In 1839, he was taken again to court, blamed for Paine D. Badger's use of his system. Thomson himself published a Report of the trial of Dr. Samuel Thomson, the founder of the Thomsonian practice, for an alleged libel in warning the public against the impositions of Paine D. Badger, as a Thomsonian physician sailing under false colors, before Judge Thacher (1839), where he expressed that he was worried about the use other people could do under his name. Partly because of this, he took great care to guard his patented cures, and used legal authority to prevent others from manufacturing and selling lobelia pills, for instance. He sold rights to use his system of medicine to any family for $20. Right-holders were able to purchase Thomson's herbs and formulas, which he distributed from a central warehouse, and a copy of Thomson's book. He had sold over 100,000 patents by 1840, but this consortium was broken by Alva Curtis, who created the "Independent Thomsonian Medical Society" to train practitioners.

Illustrating another case, Thomson wrote:

Almost every newspaper from abroad brings the name of some person setting up as a Thomsonian Doctor and passing as my agent, of whom I know nothing and who knows nothing of my system or medicines from me. A man calling himself Benjamin Thomson has just opened in Alexandria, District of Columbia, and advertises in the National Intelligencer. I know nothing of what he may do under color of my name and I wish the people there to understand it and not lay any blame to the Thomsonian system for any thing he may do....Among those who have been or are using my name and medicines without any authority from me are Charles Holman, Portsmouth, N. H.; John A. Brown, Providence, R. I.; G. Larabee at Baltimore; Clark & Wilder at Randolph, Mass.

Herbalist Michael Moore, gives a flavor criticism of the debate of the times, stating that Thomson's own perception of the controversies was "couched in seeming venal paranoia", and that:

Thomson's movement had affected a million or more Americans, started a medical reformation that would not peak for another 50 years, and the brightest medical minds of the time were split vehemently both against and for Thomson's right to practice...bitterly divided between Federalists and Republican politics...Populists and Elitists...rural and urban. The tribulations of this former pig farmer rocked the young republic for over a decade and were headlines everywhere. Because of the success of Thomson and his followers, states began, for the first time, regulating medical practice along party and class lines. Messy and fascinating stuff.

Notably, the eclectic herbalist John Uri Lloyd, in his introduction to the edition of Life and medical discoveries of Samuel Thomson, states that Thomson was involved in William Morgan's Anti-masonic controversy in New York, and argues that he was thus persecuted in part for political reasons:

One can not now easily enter into the problems of that day concerning medicine and the practice of medicine. The passion, the dogmatism, the vituperation of the period, the suppression of free thought and investigation outside authority, is a something that can not now be expressed or readily appreciated... he was involved by Mr. Locke in the famous Morgan Masonic controversy, the raging in New York. This leads us to state than a share, and possible no small proportion, of Thomson's troubles, came also from his pronounced political activity, at a time when in American politics no toleration whatever was exhibited by one party for an adherent of the opposite political faith... Thomson's allegiance to the minority party of that date led to much of his persecution.

Thomson's system, however, was still well received by people like William Renwick Riddell in Canada; his main work passing through 13 editions, and also finding German advocates who translated his main work into the German language.

Thomson's ultimate position about his own system was stated four years before his death, when he wrote:

I have devoted most of a long life to reducing to a safe and simple practice a system of medical treatment, that should remedy the evils with which mankind has been afflicted to an incalculable amount, ever since the introduction of mineral poisons in the fifteenth century, which have ever since, formed the materia medica of the regular doctors, as they are called, and which are given to cure sick men, though sure to kill well ones if administered to them...But I wish, while living, to see my system promulgated, if at all, in its purity, and when dead, handed down through others who will preserve it, and not let it fall back again into the pernicious practices that have so long plagued the world under high-sounding names of learned quackery. If I am to be remembered at all, for I am past the age of ambition, I want it to be as a benefactor and not as a curse to mankind; and this depends upon the fact, whether the learned Faculty on one side, from design and malice, and the ignorant Impostors on the other, from love of gain, shall abuse my system, and turn a great good into a great evil, till the people lose all confidence in the genuine by being poisoned by the counterfeit.
I trust my life will be long enough to enable me to warn the people against these two rocks, upon which the Thomsonian practice will be in the greatest danger of shipwreck. This has been the sole object of all my warnings, published to guard against impostors. It is no longer a question that this system will be used, but how it will be used, is what most concerns the public.

— Thomson (1839)

== Works ==
- New Guide to Health, or, Botanic Family Physician (1822)
- The Friend to Health (1826)
- Four lectures on the Thomsonian practice of medicine (1828)
- A course of fifteen lectures, on medical botany, denominated Thomson's theory of medical practice (1829)
  - A course of fifteen lectures, on medical botany : denominated Thomson's new theory of medical practice : in which the various theories that have preceded it are reviewed and compared (1832)
- A narrative of the life and medical discoveries of Samuel Thomsom (1835)
- Thomsonian Manual
  - Thomsonian Manual. (1835). Volume 1
  - Thomsonian Manual. (1837). Volume 2
  - Thomsonian Manual. (1838). Volume 3
  - Thomsonian Manual. (1839). Volume 4
- Learned quackery exposed, or, Theory according to art (1836)
- Report of the trial of Dr. Samuel Thomson, the founder of the Thomsonian practice, for an alleged libel in warning the public against the impositions of Paine D. Badger, as a Thomsonian physician sailing under false colors, before Judge Thacher, in the Mu (1839)

== See also ==
- Eclectic medicine
- Ethnobotany
- Herbalism
- Heroic medicine
- Pharmacognosy
- Phytotherapy
- Popular Health Movement
