= Methyl cinnamate =

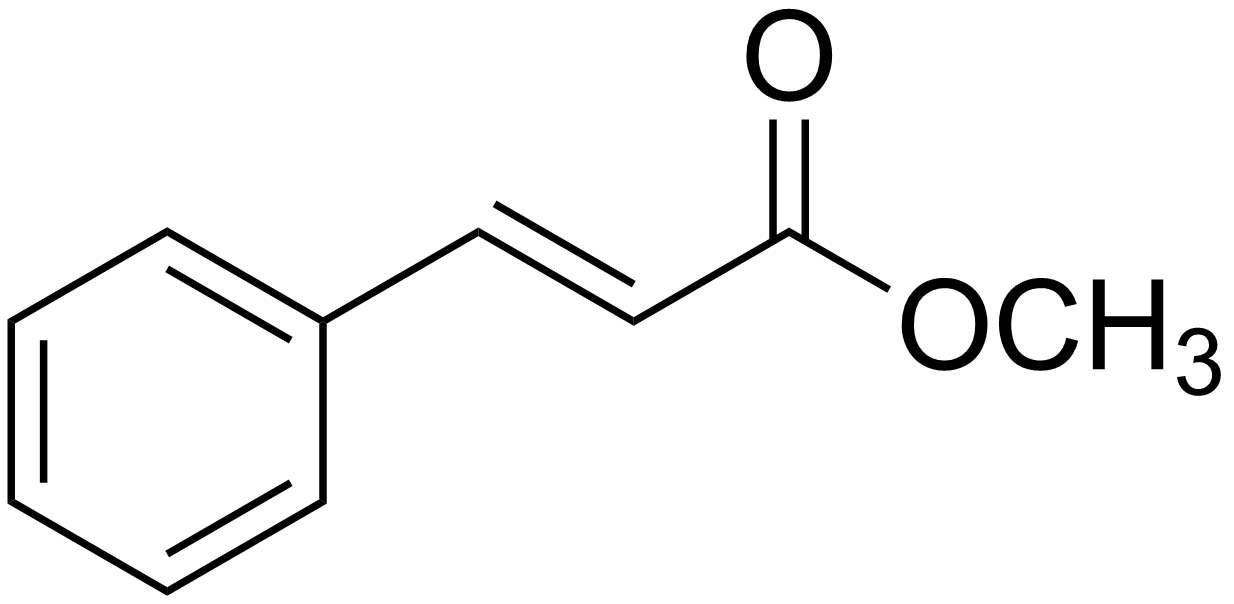

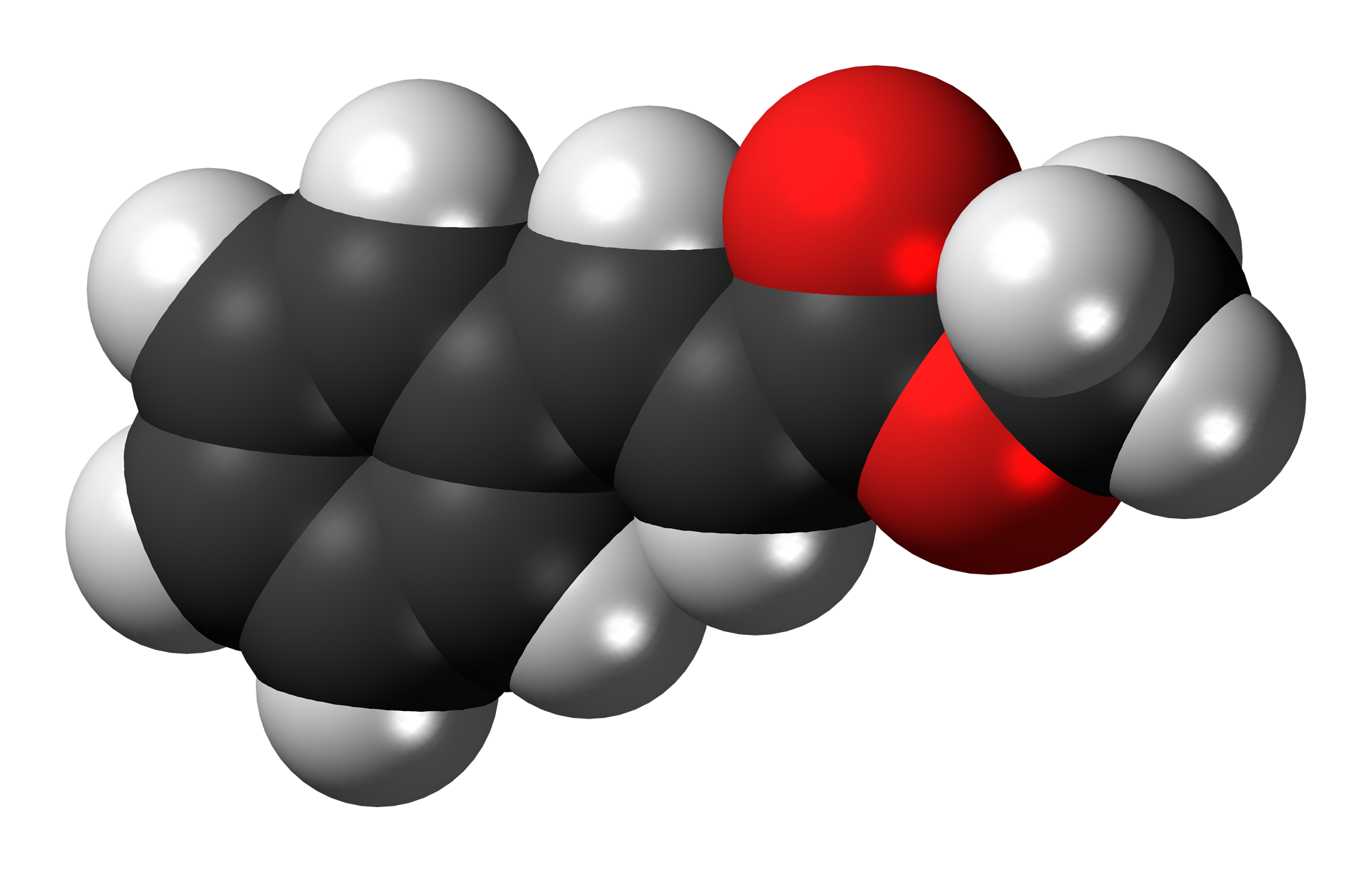

Names
- Preferred IUPAC name Methyl (2E)-3-phenylprop-2-enoate
- Other names Methyl cinnamate

Identifiers
CAS Number	103-26-4
3D model (JSmol)	Interactive image
ChEBI	CHEBI:6857
ChEMBL	ChEMBL55060
ChemSpider	21105944
ECHA InfoCard	100.002.813
EC Number	203-093-8
KEGG	C06358
PubChem CID	637520
UNII	533CV2ZCQL
CompTox Dashboard (EPA)	DTXSID6042151
- InChI: InChI=1S/C10H10O2/c1-12-10(11)8-7-9-5-3-2-4-6-9/h2-8H,1H3/b8-7+ Key: CCRCUPLGCSFEDV-BQYQJAHWSA-N; InChI=1/C10H10O2/c1-12-10(11)8-7-9-5-3-2-4-6-9/h2-8H,1H3/b8-7+ Key: CCRCUPLGCSFEDV-BQYQJAHWBN
- SMILES: COC(=O)C=CC1=CC=CC=C1

Properties
Chemical formula	C_{10}H_{10}O_{2}
Molar mass	162.188 g·mol^{−1}
Density	1.092 g/cm^{3}
Melting point	34–38 °C (93–100 °F; 307–311 K)
Boiling point	261–262 °C (502–504 °F; 534–535 K)
Solubility in water	Insoluble

Hazards
- GHS labelling
Pictograms	(GHS07: Exclamation mark)
Signal word	Warning
Hazard statements	H317
Precautionary statements	P261, P272, P280, P302+P352, P321, P333+P313, P363, P501
Flash point	> 110 °C (230 °F; 383 K)
- Except where otherwise noted, data are given for materials in their standard state (at 25 °C [77 °F], 100 kPa). verify (what is ?) Infobox references

Methyl cinnamate is the methyl ester of cinnamic acid and is a white or transparent solid with a strong, aromatic odor. It is found naturally in a variety of plants, including in fruits, like strawberry, and some culinary spices, such as Sichuan pepper and some varieties of basil. Eucalyptus olida has the highest known concentrations of methyl cinnamate (98%) with a 2–6% fresh weight yield in the leaf and twigs.

Methyl cinnamate is used in the flavor and perfume industries. The flavor is fruity and strawberry-like; and the odor is sweet, balsamic with fruity odor, reminiscent of cinnamon and strawberry.

It is known to attract males of various orchid bees, such as Aglae caerulea.

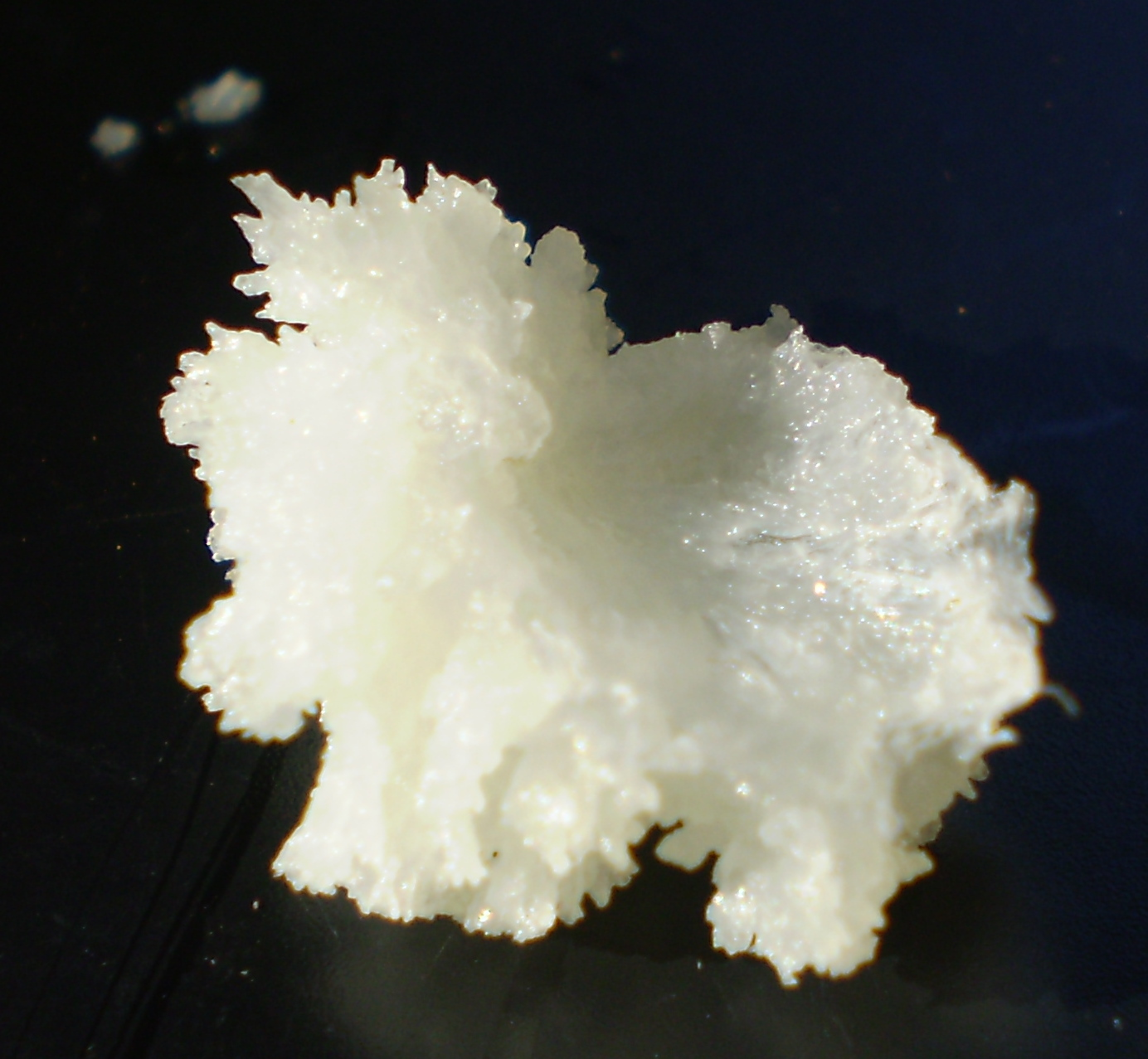
Methyl cinnamate crystals extracted using steam distillation from Eucalyptus olida.

== List of plants that contain the chemical ==
- Eucalyptus olida 'Strawberry Gum'
- Ocotea quixos South American (Ecuadorian) Cinnamon, Ishpingo
- Ocimum americanum cv. Purple Lovingly (Querendona Morada)
- Ocimum americanum cv. Purple Castle (Castilla Morada)
- Ocimum americanum cv. Purple Long-legged (Zancona morada)
- Ocimum americanum cv. Clove (Clavo)
- Ocimum basilicum cv. Sweet Castle (Dulce de Castilla)
- Ocimum basilicum cv. White Compact (Blanca compacta)
- Ocimum basilicum cv. large green leaves (verde des horjas grandes)
- Ocimum micranthum cv. Cinnamon (Canela)
- Ocimum minimum cv. Little Virgin (Virgen pequena)
- Ocimum minimum cv. Purple Virgin (Virgen morada)
- Ocimum sp. cv. Purple ruffle (Crespa morada)
- Ocimum sp. cv. White Ruffle (Crespa blanca)
- Stanhopea embreei, an orchid
- Vanilla

== Toxicology and safety ==
Moderately toxic by ingestion. The oral LD_{50} for rats is 2610 mg/kg. It is combustible as a liquid, and when heated to decomposition it emits acrid smoke and irritating fumes.

== Compendial status ==
- Food Chemicals Codex

== See also ==
- Eucalyptus oil
- Ralf Sieckmann v Deutsches Patent und Markenamt, a court case concerning a company attempting to trademark the chemical compound.
