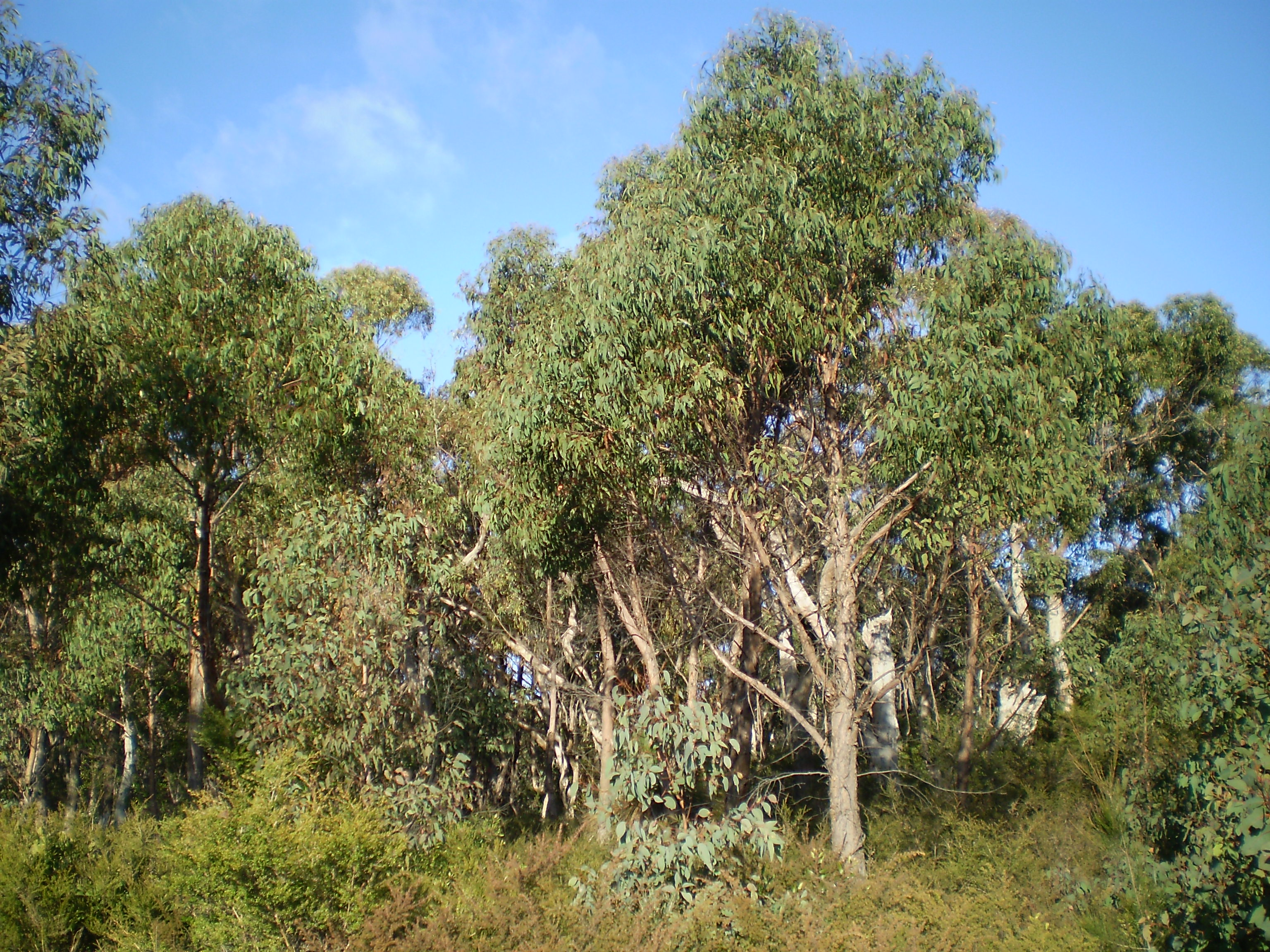

Scientific classification
- Kingdom: Plantae
- Clade: Tracheophytes
- Clade: Angiosperms
- Clade: Eudicots
- Clade: Rosids
- Order: Myrtales
- Family: Myrtaceae
- Genus: Eucalyptus
- Species: E. olida

Binomial name
- Eucalyptus olida L.A.S.Johnson & K.D.Hill

= Eucalyptus olida =

Species of eucalyptus

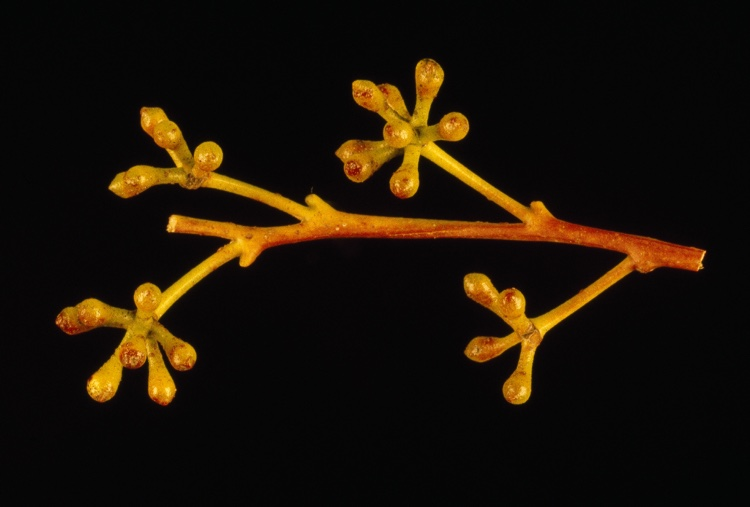
Flower buds

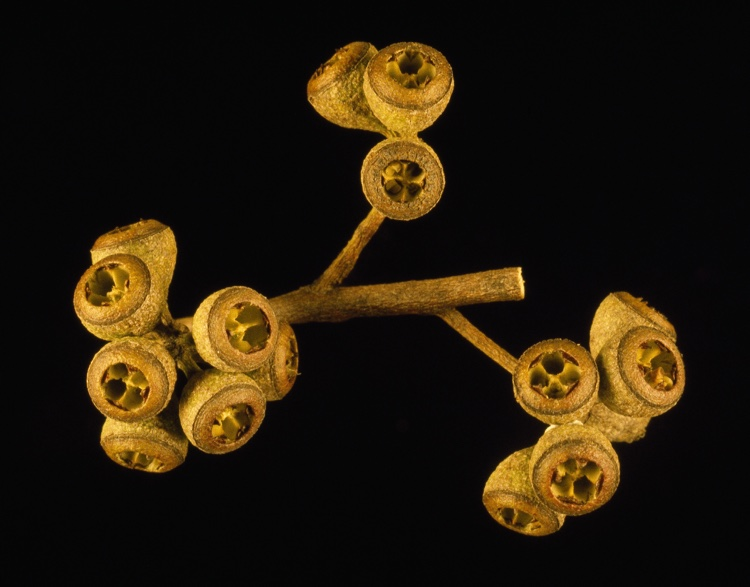
Fruit

Eucalyptus olida, commonly known as strawberry gum or sometimes as forest berry, is a species of small to medium-sized tree that is endemic to a restricted area of New South Wales, Australia. It has rough, flaky and fibrous bark on the trunk and larger branches, lance-shaped to curved adult leaves, flower buds in groups of seven to fifteen or more, white flowers and barrel-shaped or bell-shaped fruit.

== Description ==
Eucalyptus olida is a tree that typically grows to a height of 20–30 m (66–98 ft) and forms a lignotuber. It has thick, rough, fibrous and flaky bark on the trunk and larger branches, smooth white or grey bark that is shed in long ribbons from branches less than 50–80 mm (2.0–3.1 in) in diameter. Young plants and coppice regrowth have dull bluish green, egg-shaped leaves that are 45–100 mm (1.8–3.9 in) long and 25–55 mm (0.98–2.17 in) wide. Adult leaves are the same shade of dull to slightly glossy green on both sides, lance-shaped to curved, 70–185 mm (2.8–7.3 in) long and 9–26 mm (0.35–1.02 in) wide tapering to a petiole 10–20 mm (0.39–0.79 in) long. The flower buds are arranged in leaf axils in groups of between seven and fifteen or more on an unbranched peduncle 4–18 mm (0.16–0.71 in) long, the individual buds on pedicels 3–4 mm (0.12–0.16 in) long. Mature buds are oval, about 4 mm (0.16 in) long and 2–3 mm (0.079–0.118 in) wide with a rounded or conical operculum. Flowering has been recorded in February and the flowers are white. The fruit is a woody, barrel-shaped or bell-shaped capsule with the valves near rim level.

== Taxonomy and naming ==
Eucalyptus olida was first formally described in 1990 by Lawrie Johnson and Ken Hill in the journal Telopea. The specific epithet (olida) is from the Latin olidus, meaning "smelling" or "rank", referring to the odour of the leaves when crushed.

== Distribution and habitat ==
This eucalypt is restricted to the Gibraltar Range National Park and nearby Timbarra Plateau, where it grows in forest and woodland in shallow soil derived from granite.

== Uses ==
=== Essential oils ===
The leaves of E. olida are distilled for their crystalline essential oils used in flavouring and perfumery. The leaf oil is 98% methyl cinnamate and yield is 2-6% of fresh leaf weight. Extracts from the leaves in hexane, methanol and ethyl acetate solvents have high anti-oxidant activity.

=== Use in Food ===
The dried, ground leaves of E. olida are also used as a complementary or enhancing spice in bushfood cooking, with a flavour described as sweet, aromatic, and a mix of berry and passionfruit.

== Gallery ==
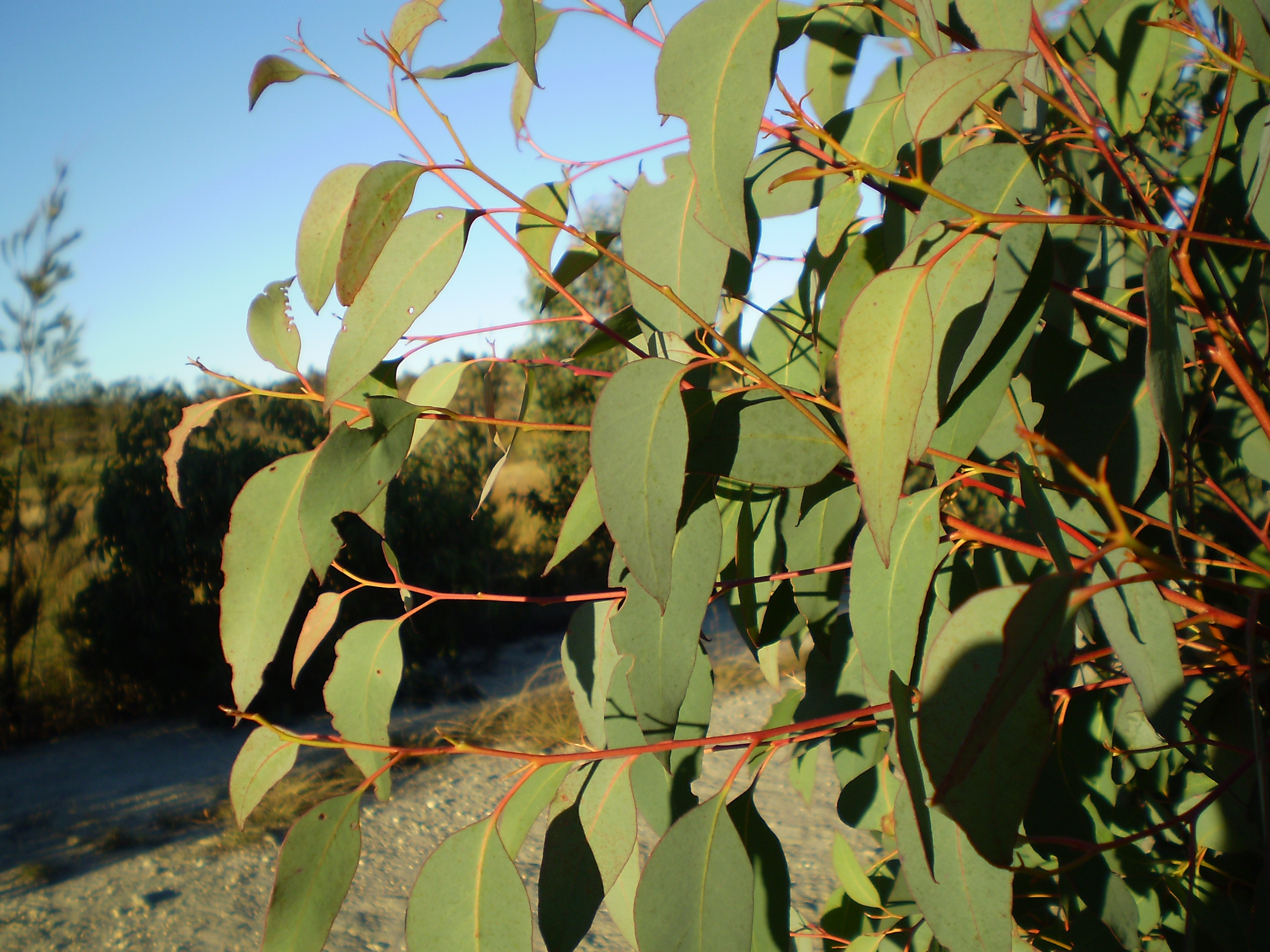
Juvenile foliage

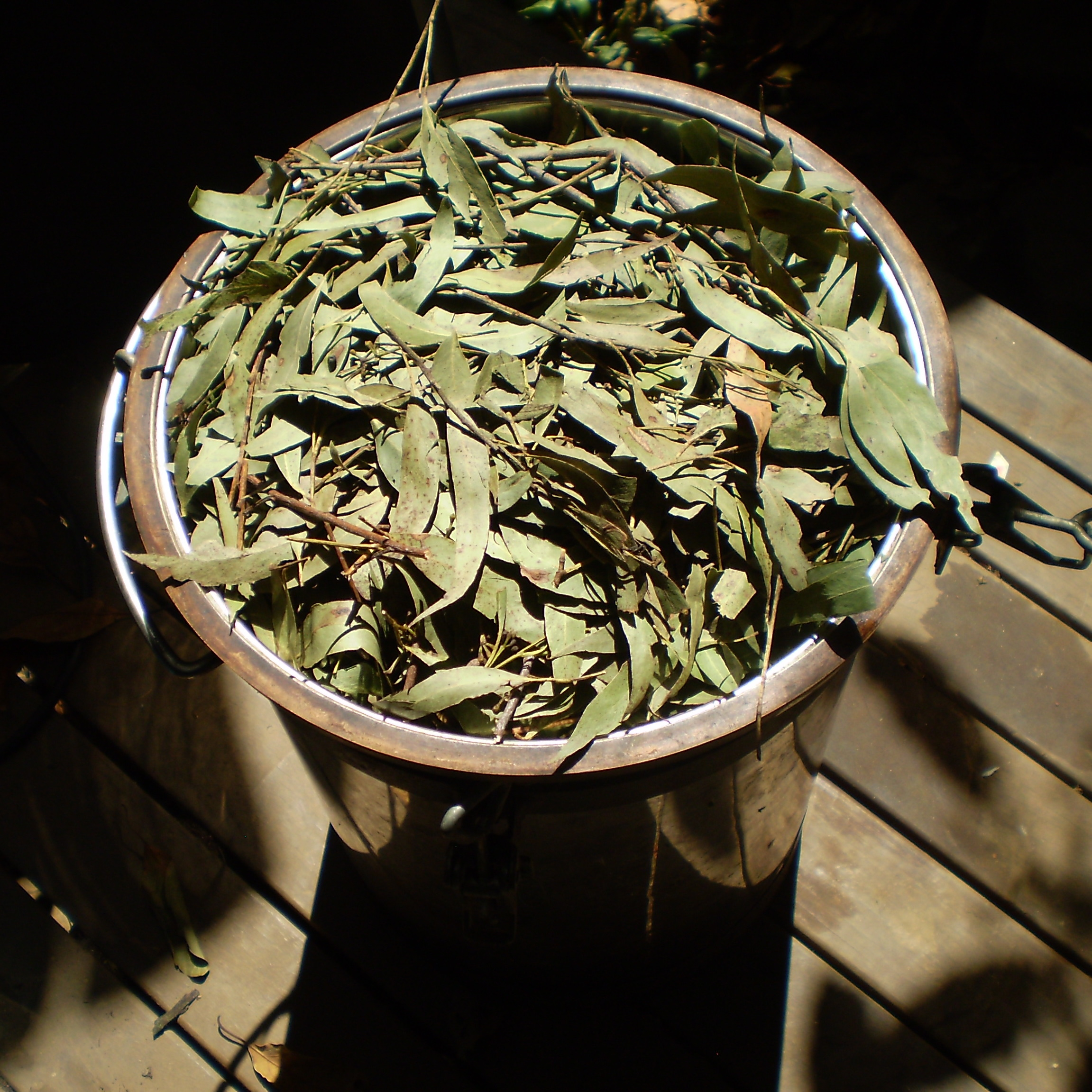
Leaves in small steam distillation unit
