= Popular Health Movement =

The Popular Health Movement of the 1830s–1850s was an aspect of Jacksonian-era politics and society in the United States. The movement promoted a rational skepticism toward claims of medical expertise that were based on personal authority, and encouraged ordinary people to understand the pragmatics of health care. Arising in the spirit of Andrew Jackson's anti-elitist views, the movement succeeded in ending almost all government regulation of health care. During the first two decades of the 19th century, states had regularly enacted licensing legislation; by 1845, only three states still licensed medical doctors. Among the leading figures within the movement were Samuel Thomson and Sylvester Graham.

== Principles ==
Thomsonianism, characterized by Paul Starr as "a creative misreading of the Enlightenment," viewed therapeutics within the framework of political ideology. Thompson did not reject science per se, but rather the control of knowledge by an elite who sought to mystify it. One Thomsonian writer asserted, "There can be no good reason for keeping us ignorant of the medicines we are compelled to swallow." In the Thomsonian view knowledge, which in a democracy ought to be available to all, was an element in class conflict.

Egalitarian politics was thus a driving force in the Popular Health Movement, as articulated for instance throughout the writings of John C. Gunn:

political equality becomes synonymous with 'equality in knowledge,' and tyranny is fought by the 'equalization of useful intelligence' among American citizens … . Health becomes crucial in these Jacksonian equations because, without health, intelligence, the building block of republican government, becomes impaired and feeble. Citizens must be healthy in order to be politically free.

Gunn emphasized an active relationship between physician and patient in the form of dialogue, directed toward understanding sickness in the context of the individual's psychology and everyday habits. Although Gunn was a proponent of common sense and believed that ordinary people could understand practical medicine, his thinking was hierarchical in affirming the authority of professional doctors. Edward Bliss Foote, who was among those arrested under the Comstock laws for advocating and selling contraceptive devices, titled one of his books Medical Common Sense, for which he advocated from the first sentence of the preface:

'Common Sense,' I am aware, is quoted at a discount; especially by the medical profession, which proverbially ignores everything that has not the mixed odor of incomprehensibility and antiquity. Medical works are generally a heterogeneous compound of vague ideas and jaw-breaking words, in which the dead languages are largely employed to treat of living subjects.

== Role of women ==
The Popular Health Movement coincides with a resurgence of women as health practitioners. In colonial America, most medical care had been administered at home by a woman, and the lay practice of medicine was dominated by women. By the Jacksonian era, a male-driven culture of self-proclaimed expertise — licensing was still not the norm — had displaced even midwifery in the care chosen by the upper and middle classes. The decline of women as medical practitioners parallels their withdrawal from other occupations, such as shopkeeping, in which women had freely engaged during the colonial period. But as the population dispersed, particularly in the South and West, a lack of access to physicians contributed to women once again playing a major role in providing health care. Gunn's work Domestic Medicine, for instance, provided detailed instructions on delivering babies; performing vaccinations, abortions, and minor surgeries; and recognizing and treating the symptoms of disease. Because male physicians almost unanimously opposed admitting women into the profession, during the 1830s women involved with healing were more likely to find allies among alternative medical practitioners such as Sylvester Graham.

Although there were social barriers to professional education for women, the women's rights movement advanced the efforts of women to obtain formal medical training, and in 1848, the New England Medical College in Boston (now Boston University School of Medicine) became the first medical school in the world that was exclusively for women.

== Consequences ==
The egalitarian impulse encouraged ordinary people to acquire knowledge, but this informed awareness of what it took to obtain a high level of expertise eventually led to a proliferation of medical schools and licensing — that is, to a greater emphasis on credentials. A "dialectic" between the culture of professionalism and the culture of democracy thus shaped 19th-century medicine in America, which throughout the Western world was a time of progressivity in medical science. The same democratic rationality that had provoked skepticism about medical authority became logically allied with advances in science, which in turn undermined appeals to common sense by establishing methodologies of expertise.

== See also ==
- Clean living movement
- Thomsonianism, a popular fad based on herbal medicine
