= List of basil cultivars =

Basil cultivars are cultivated varieties of basil. They are used in a variety of ways: as culinary herbs, landscape plants, healing herbs, teas, and worship implements. All true basils are species of the genus Ocimum. The genus is particularly diverse, and includes annuals, non-woody perennials and shrubs native to Africa and other tropical and subtropical regions. Although it is estimated that there are 50 to 150 species of basil, most, but not all, culinary basils are cultivars of O. basilicum, or sweet basil. Some are cultivars of other basil species, and others are hybrids. It is particularly challenging to determine which species a basil belongs to. This is because basil cross-breeds easily, and drawing boundaries between species is particularly difficult. In fact, recent studies have led to reclassification of some portions of the genus.

Basil cultivars vary in several ways. Visually, the size and shape of the leaves varies greatly, from the large lettuce-like leaves of the Mammoth basil and Lettuce leaf basil to the tiny leaves of the Dwarf bush basil. More practically, the fragrance of the basil varies due to the varying types and quantities of essential oils contained in the plants. The most important are 1,8 cineol, linalool, citral, methyl chavicol (estragole), eugenol and methyl cinnamate, although hardly any basil contains all of these in any significant amount.

== Basil cultivars ==
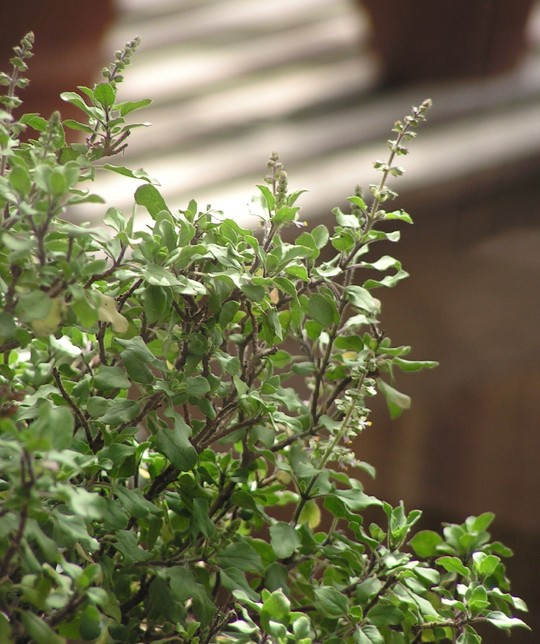
Holy basil

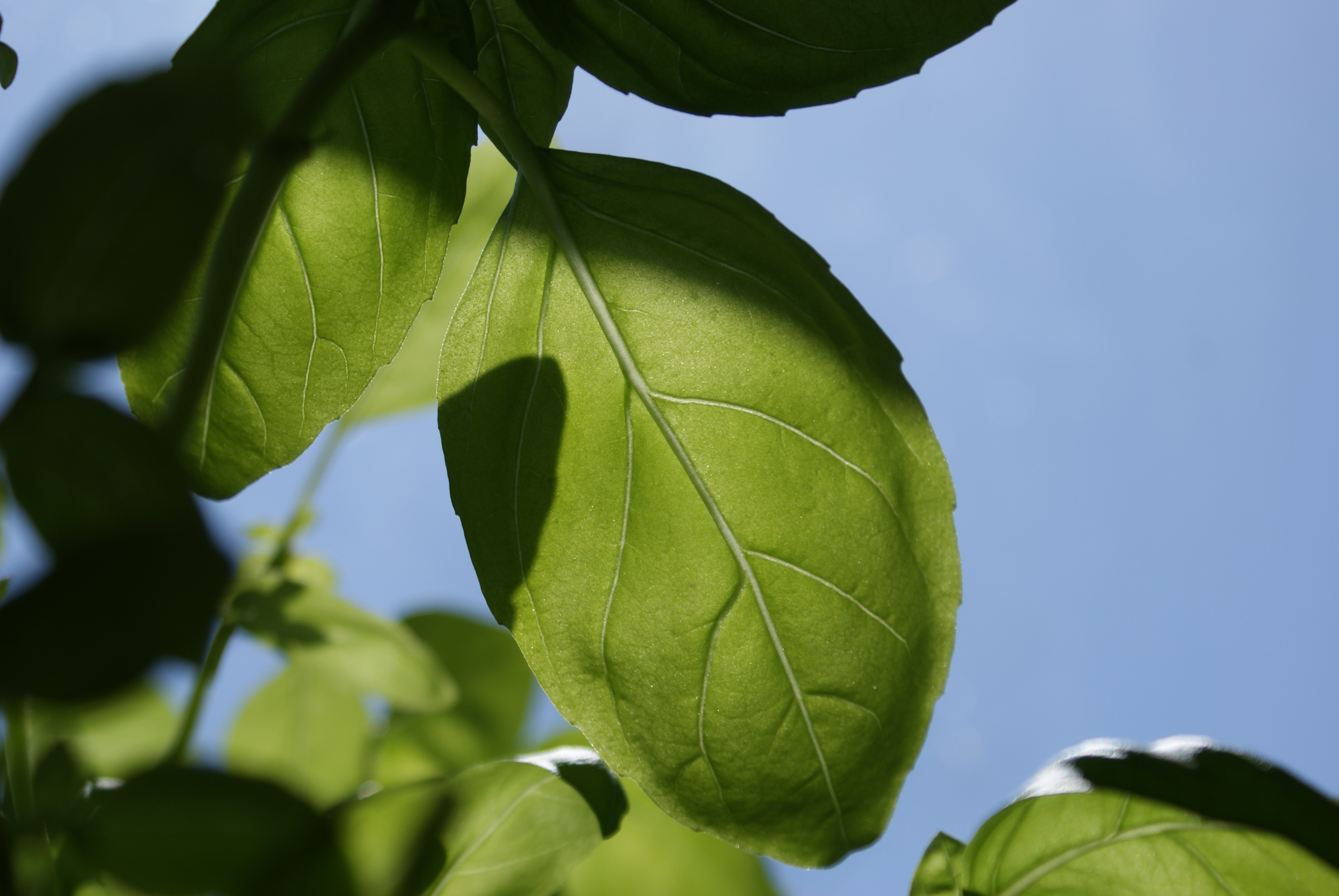
Sweet basil growing in the sun

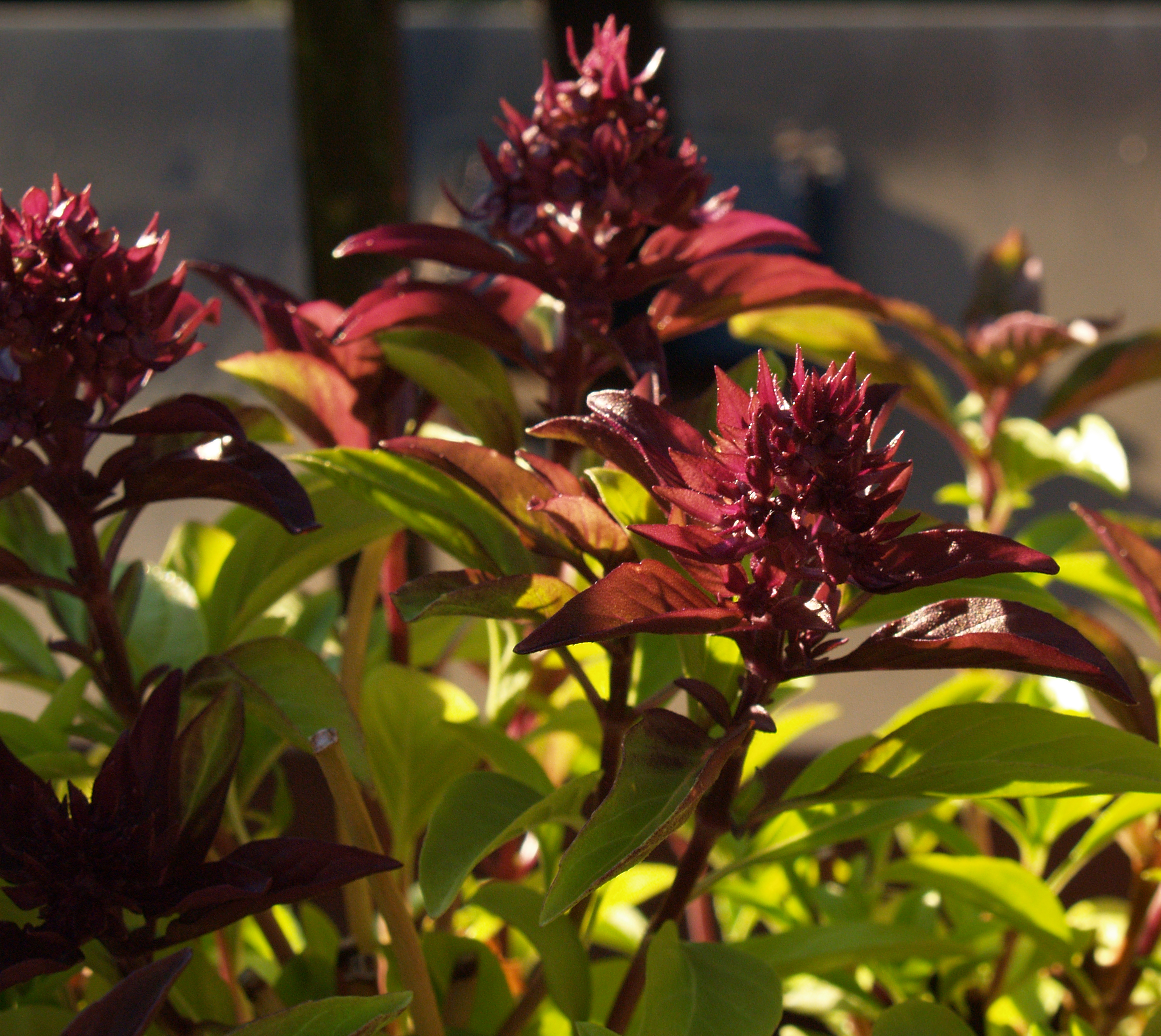
Late summer Thai basil flowers

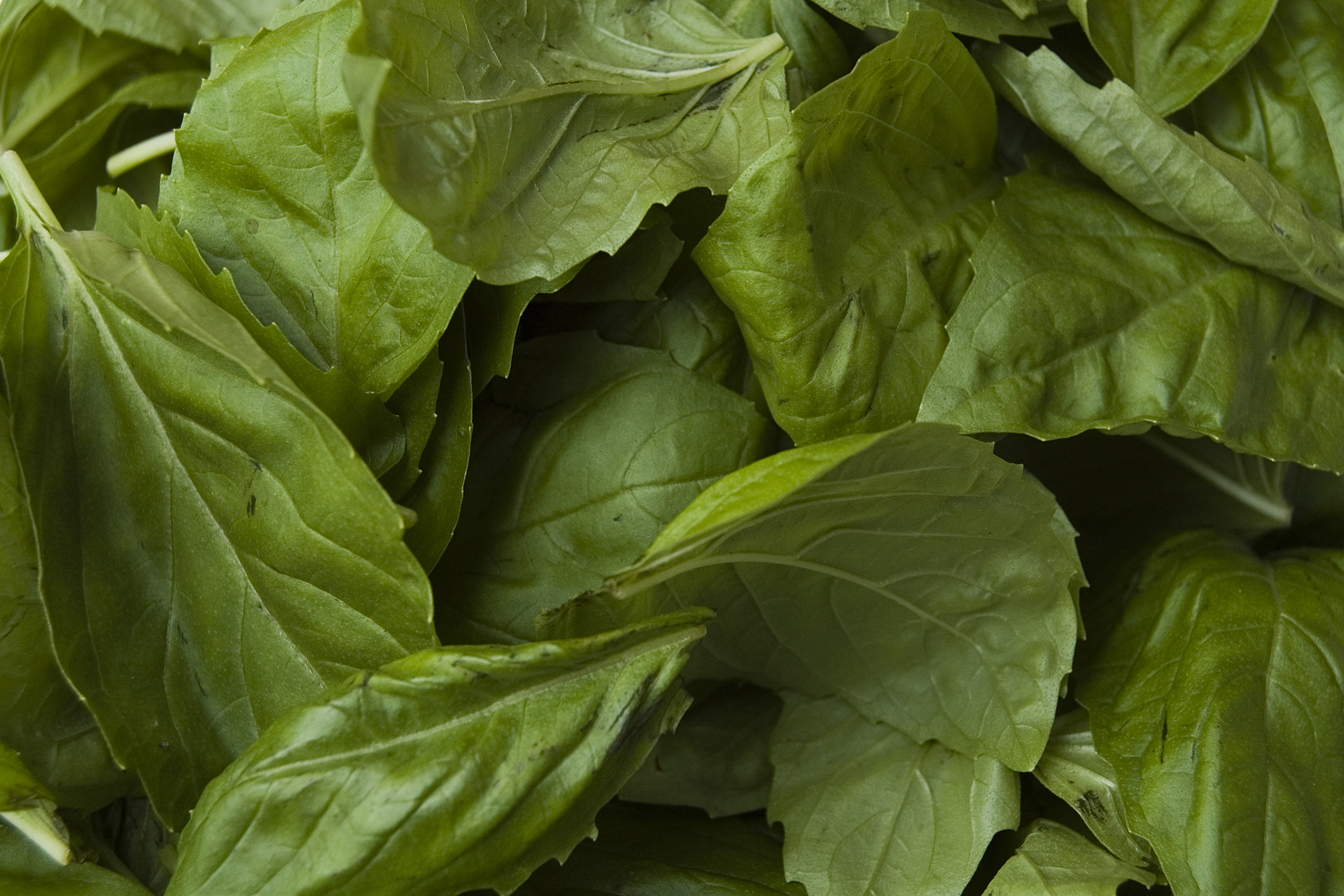
Harvested sweet basil leaves

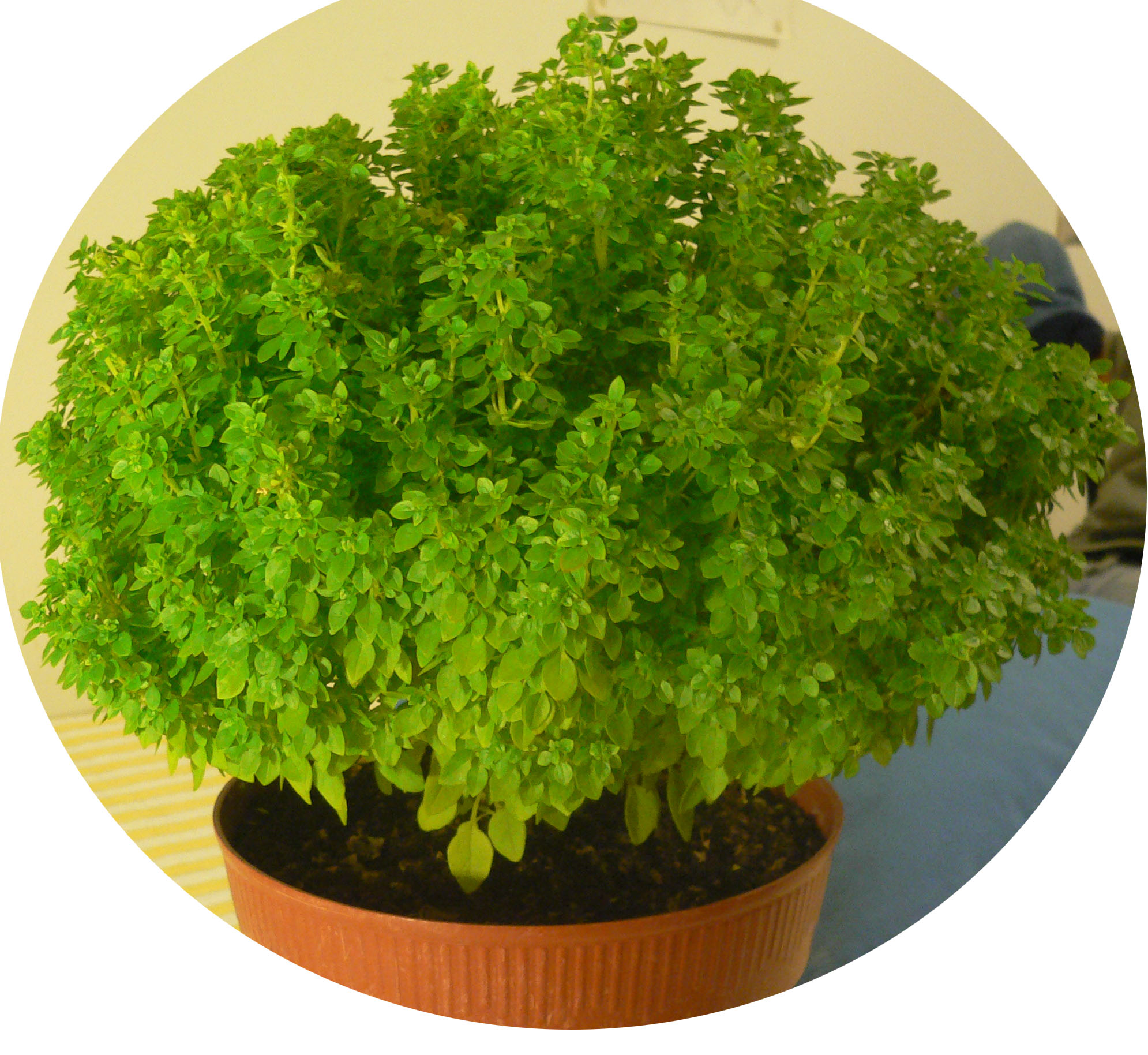
Greek Bush Basil

Ocimum basilicum cultivars
Common name	Species and cultivars	Description
Sweet basil, Genovese basil, great basil	O. basilicum	With a strong clove scent when fresh.
Lettuce leaf basil	O. basilicum 'Lettuce Leaf'	Has leaves so large they are sometimes used in salads.
Mammoth basil	O. basilicum 'Mammoth'	Another large-leaf variety, stronger flavor than sweet Genovese.
Genovese basil	O. basilicum 'Genovese Gigante'	Almost as popular as sweet basil, with similar flavor.
Nufar basil	O. basilicum 'Nufar F1'	Variety of Genovese resistant to fusarium wilt.
Spicy globe basil	O. basilicum 'Spicy Globe'	Grows in a bush form, very small leaves, strong flavor.
Greek Yevani basil	O. basilicum 'Greek Yevani'	Organically grown version of Spicy globe basil.
Fino verde basil	O. basilicum piccolo	Small, narrow leaves, sweeter, less pungent smell than larger leaved varieties.
Boxwood basil	O. basilicum 'Boxwood'	Grows tightly like boxwood, very small leaves, strong flavor, great for pestos.
Purple ruffles basil	O. basilicum 'Purple Ruffles'	Solid purple, rich and spicy and a little more anise-like than the flavor of Genovese Basil.
Magical Michael	O. basilicum 'Magical Michael'	Award-winning hybrid with an uncommon degree of uniformity, and nice flavor for culinary use.
Dark opal basil	O. basilicum 'Purpurascens'	Award-winning variety, developed at the University of Connecticut in the 1950s.
Red rubin basil	O. basilicum 'Purpurascens' 'Red Rubin'	Strong magenta color, similar flavor to sweet basil, also called Opal basil.
Osmin purple basil	O. basilicum 'Osmin Purple'	Dark shiny purple with a jagged edge on the leaves, smaller leaves than red rubin.
Cuban basil	O. basilicum	Similar to sweet basil, with smaller leaves and stronger flavor, grown from cuttings.
Thai basil	O. basilicum var. thyrsiflorum	Called Ho-ra-pa (โหระพา) in Thai, gets its scent of licorice from estragole.
'Siam Queen'	O. basilicum var. thyrsiflorum 'Siam Queen'	A named cultivar of Thai Basil
Cinnamon basil	O. basilicum 'Cinnamon'	Also called Mexican spice basil, with a strong scent of cinnamate, the same chemical as in cinnamon. Has purple flowers.
Licorice basil	O. basilicum 'Licorice'	Also known as Anise basil or Persian basil, silvery leaves, spicy licorice smell comes from the same chemical as in anise, anethole. Thai basil is also sometimes called Licorice basil.
White basil	O. basilicum var. pilosum	White and hairy branches/leaves and white flowers. Aromatic lemon scent. Called é in Vietnamese.
Mrs. Burns' Lemon	O. basilicum var. citriodora 'Mrs. Burns' Lemon'	Clean, aromatic lemon scent, similar to lemon basil.
Ocimum americanum (formerly known as O. canum) cultivars
Common name	Species and cultivars	Description
Lemon basil	O. americanum	Contains citral and limonene, therefore actually does smell very lemony, tastes sweeter. Originally, and sometimes still, called "hoary basil". Popular in Indonesia, where it is known as 'kemangi'. Also sometimes 'Indonesian basil'.
Lime basil	O. americanum	Similar to lemon basil.
Ocimum ×citriodorum cultivars
Common name	Species and cultivars	Description
Greek column basil	O. × citriodorum 'Lesbos'	Columnar basil, can only be propagated from cuttings.
Thai lemon basil	O. × citriodorum	Called mangluk (แมงลัก) in Thai. It has a citrus odor, with a distinct Lemon-balm-like flavor
Other species and hybrids
Common name	Species and cultivars	Description
Holy basil	O. sanctum (alt. O. tenuiflorum)	Also sacred basil, Tulsi (तुलसी) in Hindi, a perennial breed from India, used in Ayurveda, for worship, and in Thai cooking. Called kaphrao (กะเพรา) in Thai.
Clove Basil	O. gratissimum	
Greek basil (Greek spicy globe Basil)	O. minimum (alt. O. basilicum var. minimum)	Forms a nearly perfectly round globe, with thin, tiny leaves and a delicious scent. Despite its name, the variety probably originated in Chile.
Dwarf bush basil	O. minimum	Unusually small bush variety, similar to Greek bush basil.
African blue basil	O. kilimandscharicum × basilicum	A sterile perennial hybrid, with purple coloration on its leaves and containing a strong portion of actual camphor in its scent.
Spice basil	O. basilicum × americanum	A fruity/musky-scented cultivar sometimes sold as Holy Basil
Sweet Dani basil	O. basilicum × americanum	A vigorous, large-leaved green basil with a strong, fresh lemon scent, a 1998 All-American Selection.
Camphor basil	O. kilimandscharicum	

== See also ==
- International Code of Nomenclature for Cultivated Plants
- Lists of cultivars
