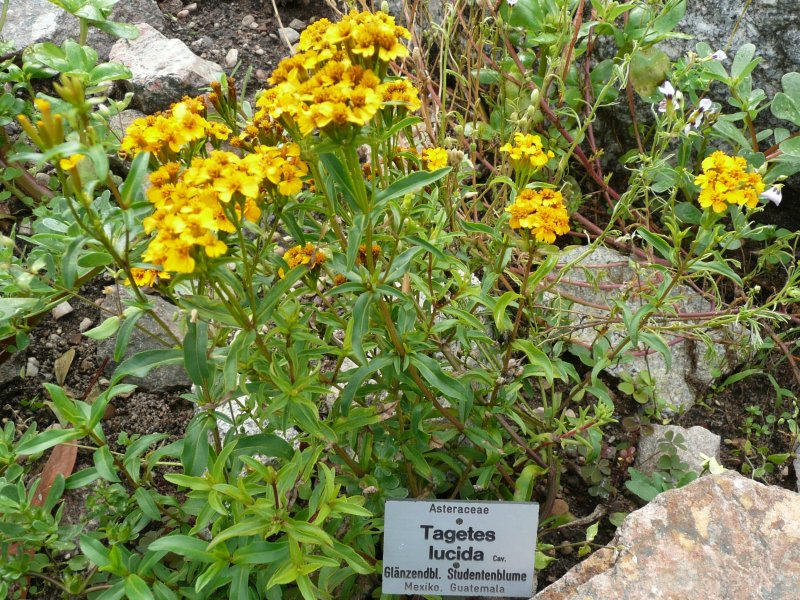
- Botanischer Garten Erlangen, Germany

Scientific classification
- Kingdom: Plantae
- Clade: Tracheophytes
- Clade: Angiosperms
- Clade: Eudicots
- Clade: Asterids
- Order: Asterales
- Family: Asteraceae
- Genus: Tagetes
- Species: T. lucida

Binomial name
- Tagetes lucida Cav.

Synonyms
- Tagetes anethina Sessé & Moc.; Tagetes florida Sweet; Tagetes gilletii De Wild.; Tagetes lucida f. florida (Sweet) Voss; Tagetes pineda La Llave; Tagetes schiedeana Less; Tagetes seleri Rydb.

= Tagetes lucida =

Species of flowering plant

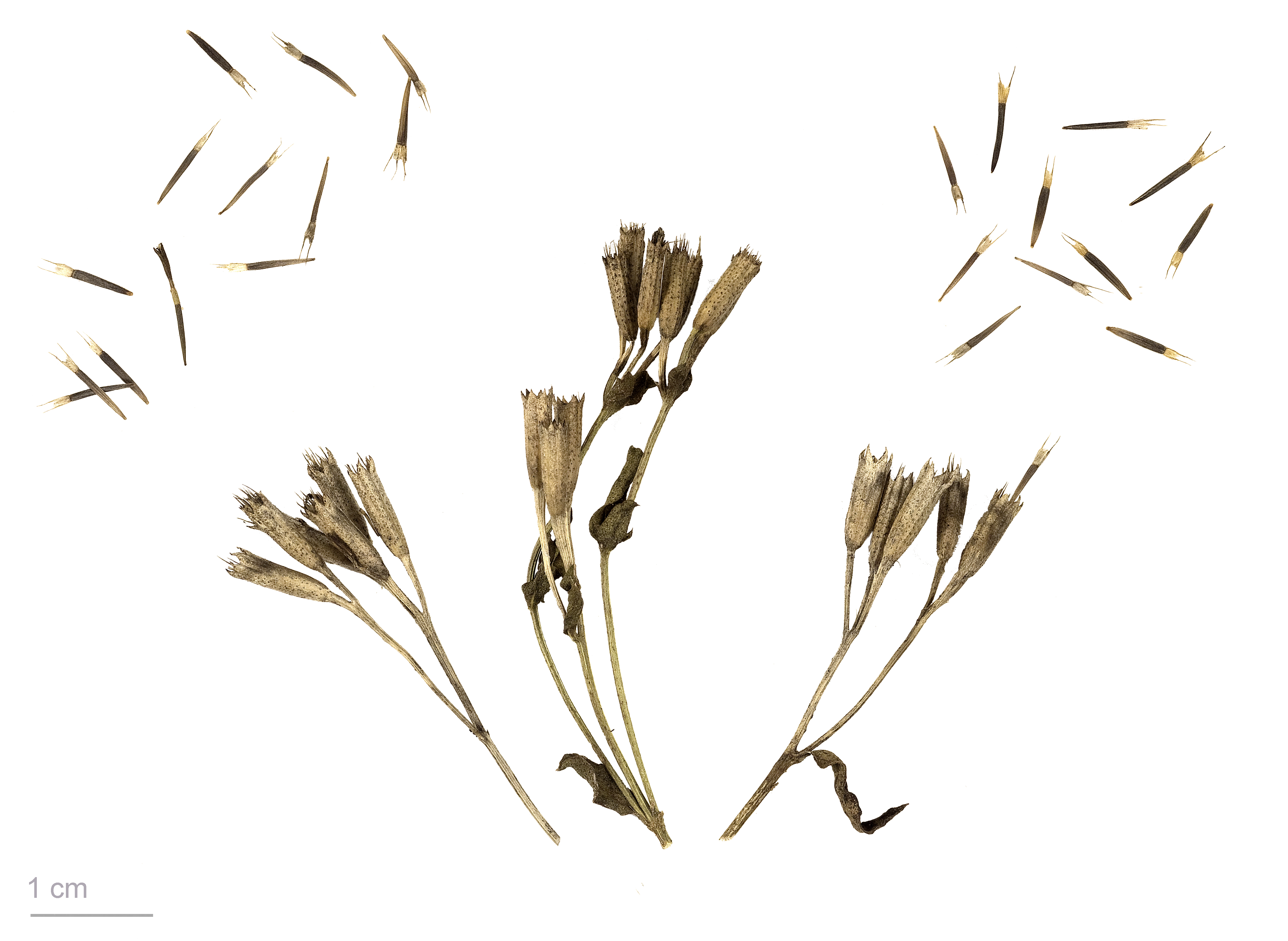
Tagetes lucida - MHNT

Tagetes lucida is a perennial plant native to Mexico and Central America. It is used as a medicinal plant and as a culinary herb. The leaves have a tarragon-like scent, with hints of anise, and it has entered the nursery trade in North America as a tarragon substitute. Common names include sweetscented marigold, Mexican marigold, Mexican mint marigold, Mexican tarragon, sweet mace, Texas tarragon, pericón, yerbaniz, and hierbanís.

== Description ==
Tagetes lucida grows 45–75 cm (18–30 in) tall and requires full sun to light shade. Depending on the variety or landrace, the plant may be fairly upright, while other forms appear bushy with many unbranching stems. The leaves are linear to oblong, about 7.5 cm (3 in) long, and shiny medium green, not blue-green as in French tarragon (Artemisia dracunculus var. sativa). In late summer it bears clusters of small golden yellow flower heads on the ends of the stems. The flower heads are about 15 mm (1/2 in) across and have 3–5 golden-yellow ray florets. The flowers are hermaphroditic (have both male and female organs) and are pollinated by insects.

== Traditional use ==
Tagetes lucida was used by the Aztecs in a ritual incense known as Yauhtli, as well as being dedicated to the rain god Tlāloc. Tagetes lucida is used by the Nahua People during rituals called limpias to treat individuals that were struck by lightning. By rubbing the plant on the body, it cleanses the aftereffects of the lightning strike. Tagetes lucida is still in use today primarily as a tea to treat the common cold, intestinal gas and diarrhea.

It has been reported that the Huichol of Mexico use the plant as an entheogen by smoking Tagetes lucida with Nicotiana rustica, and that Tagetes lucida is occasionally smoked alone as an hallucinogen. Archaeologists found that the Maya used Tagetes lucida as an additive in tobacco mixtures.

Tagetes lucida also had many culinary uses by the Aztecs including as one of the ingredients added to make the drink chocolatl, which gave it a spicy flavor. Fresh or dried leaves are also used as a tarragon substitute for flavoring soups and sauces. A pleasant anise-flavored tea is brewed using the dried leaves and flower heads. This is primarily used medicinally in Mexico and Central America.

A yellow dye can also be obtained from the flowers, and when the plant is dried and burnt, it is used as an incense and to repel insects.

In one study, methanolic extract from the flower inhibited growth of Staphylococcus aureus, E. coli, and Candida albicans cultures. This effect was enhanced with exposure to ultraviolet light. The roots, stems, and leaves also had the same effect when irradiated with ultraviolet light.

== Phytochemistry ==
The plant contains the following compounds:

- Anethole
- Chavicol
- Coumarin
- Estragole
- Isorhamnetin
- Methyleugenol
- Quercetin
