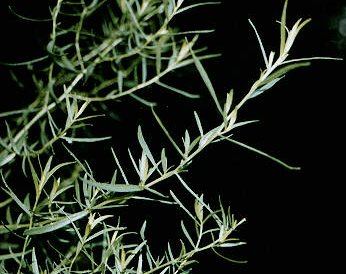

Conservation status
- Secure (NatureServe)

Scientific classification
- Kingdom: Plantae
- Clade: Tracheophytes
- Clade: Angiosperms
- Clade: Eudicots
- Clade: Asterids
- Order: Asterales
- Family: Asteraceae
- Genus: Artemisia
- Species: A. dracunculus

Binomial name
- Artemisia dracunculus L. not Hook.f. 1881

Synonyms
- Synonymy: Absinthium cernuum Moench; Achillea dracunculus Steud.; Artemisia aromatica A.Nelson; Artemisia cernua Nutt.; Artemisia changaica Krasch.; Artemisia desertorum var. macrocephala Franch.; Artemisia dracunculiformis Krasch.; Artemisia dracunculoides Pursh; Artemisia inodora Willd., nom. illeg.; Artemisia nutans Fraser ex Pursh; Artemisia redowskyi Ledeb.; Artemisia simplicifolia Pamp.; Draconia dracunculiformis (Krasch.) Soják; Draconia dracunculus (L.) Soják; Oligosporus condimentarius Cass.; Oligosporus dracunculiformis (Krasch.) Poljakov; Oligosporus dracunculoides (Pursh) Poljakov; Oligosporus dracunculus (L.) Poljakov

= Tarragon =

Species of flowering plant in the sunflower family

Tarragon (Artemisia dracunculus), also known as estragon, is a species of perennial herb in the family Asteraceae. It is widespread in the wild across much of Eurasia and North America and is cultivated for culinary and medicinal purposes.

One subspecies, Artemisia dracunculus var. sativa, is cultivated to use the leaves as an aromatic culinary herb. In some other subspecies, the characteristic aroma is largely absent. Informal names for distinguishing the variations include "French tarragon" (best for culinary use) and "Russian tarragon".

Tarragon grows to 120–150 centimetres (4–5 feet) tall, with slender branches. The leaves are lanceolate, 2–8 cm (1–3 in) long and 2–10 mm (1/8–3/8 in) broad, glossy green, with an entire margin. The flowers are produced in small capitula 2–4 mm (1/16–3/16 in) diameter, each capitulum containing up to 40 yellow or greenish-yellow florets. French tarragon, however, seldom produces any flowers (or seeds). Some tarragon plants produce seeds that are generally sterile. Others produce viable seeds. Tarragon has rhizomatous roots that it uses to spread and readily reproduces.

== Cultivation ==
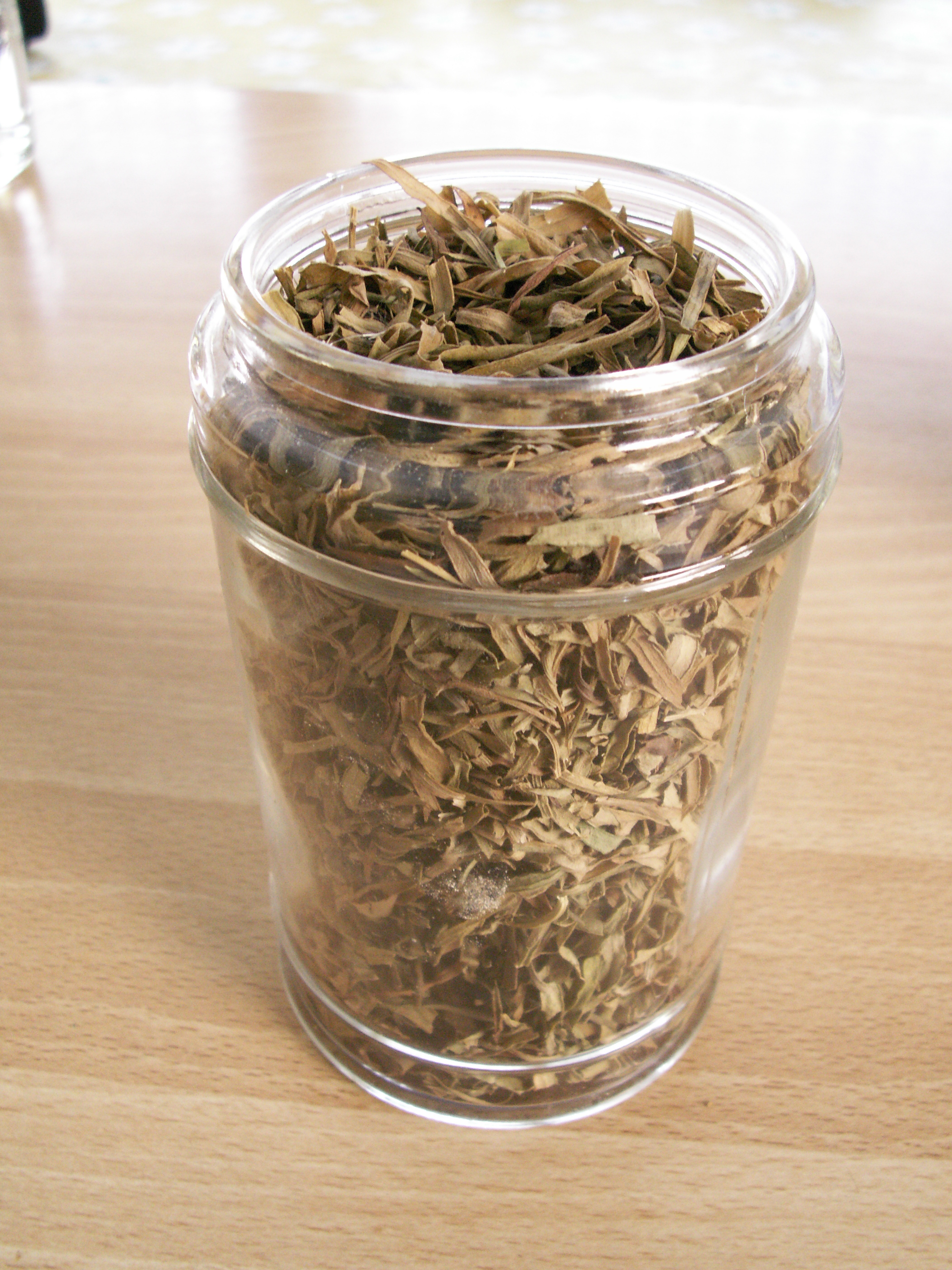
Dried tarragon leaves

French tarragon is the variety used for cooking in the kitchen and is not grown from seed, as the flowers are sterile; instead, it is propagated by root division.

Russian tarragon (A. dracunculoides L.) can be grown from seed but is much weaker in flavor when compared to the French variety. However, Russian tarragon is a far more hardy and vigorous plant, spreading at the roots and growing over a meter tall. This tarragon actually prefers poor soils and happily tolerates drought and neglect. It is not as intensely aromatic and flavorsome as its French cousin, but it produces many more leaves from early spring onwards that are mild and good in salads and cooked food. Russian tarragon loses what flavor it has as it ages and is widely considered useless as a culinary herb, though it is sometimes used in crafts. The young stems in early spring can be cooked as an asparagus substitute. Horticulturists recommend that Russian tarragon be grown indoors from seed and planted in summer. The spreading plants can be divided easily.

A better substitute for Russian tarragon is Mexican tarragon (Tagetes lucida), also known as Mexican mint marigold, Texas tarragon, or winter tarragon. It is much more reminiscent of French tarragon, with a hint of anise. Although not in the same genus as the other tarragons, Mexican tarragon has a more robust flavor than Russian tarragon that does not diminish significantly with age. It cannot however be grown as a perennial in cold climates.

== Health ==
Tarragon has a flavor and odor profile reminiscent of anise due largely to the presence of estragole, a known carcinogen and teratogen in mice. Estragole concentration in fresh tarragon leaves is about 2900 mg/kg. However, a European Union investigation concluded that the danger of estragole is minimal.

== Uses ==
=== Culinary use ===
In Syria, fresh tarragon is eaten with white Syrian cheese, and also used with dishes such as shish barak and kibbeh labaniyeh.

In Iran and Armenia, tarragon is used as a side dish in sabzi khordan/kanachi (fresh herbs), or in stews and Persian or Armenian-style pickles (t‘tu), particularly khiar shoor (pickled cucumbers) and other pickled vegetables or fruits.

Tarragon is one of the four fines herbes of French cooking and is particularly suitable for chicken, fish, and egg dishes. Tarragon is the main flavoring component of Béarnaise sauce. Fresh, lightly bruised tarragon sprigs are steeped in vinegar to produce tarragon vinegar. Pounded with butter, it produces an excellent topping for grilled salmon or beef.

Tarragon is used to flavor a popular carbonated soft drink in Armenia, Russia, Georgia (where it originally comes from), and, by extension, Ukraine and Kazakhstan. The drink, named Tarkhuna, is made out of sugar, carbonated water, and tarragon leaves which give it its signature green color.

Tarragon is one of the ingredients in chakapuli, a Georgian dish.

== Chemistry ==
Gas chromatography/mass spectrometry analysis has revealed that A. dracunculus oil contains predominantly phenylpropanoids such as estragole (16.2%), methyl eugenol (35.8%), and trans-anethole (21.1%). The other major constituents were terpenes and terpenoids, including α-trans-ocimene (20.6%), limonene (12.4%), α-pinene (5.1%), allo-ocimene (4.8%), methyl eugenol (2.2%), β-pinene (0.8%), α-terpinolene (0.5%), bornyl acetate (0.5%) and bicyclogermacrene (0.5%). The organic compound capillin was initially isolated from Artemisia capillaris in 1956.

cis-Pellitorin, an isobutyramide eliciting a pungent taste, has been isolated from the tarragon plant.

== Name ==
The plant is commonly known as dragon in Swedish and Dutch. The use of Dragon for the herb or plant in German is outdated. The species name, dracunculus, means "little dragon", and the plant seems to be so named due to its coiled roots. See Artemisia for the genus name derivative.
