= C4H9NO =

The molecular formula C_{4}H_{9}NO (molar mass: 87.1 g/mol) may refer to:

- Butyramide
- Dimethylacetamide
- Isobutyramide
- 2-Methyl-2-nitrosopropane
- γ-Aminobutyraldehyde
- Methylethyl ketone oxime
- Morpholine
