= C16H16O2 =

The molecular formula C_{16}H_{16}O_{2} may refer to:

- Dimethylstilbestrol, a nonsteroidal estrogen of the stilbestrol group related to diethylstilbestrol
- Photoanethole, a naturally occurring organic compound that is found in anise and fennel
