= Sabzi khordan =

Dish made from raw vegetables and herbs

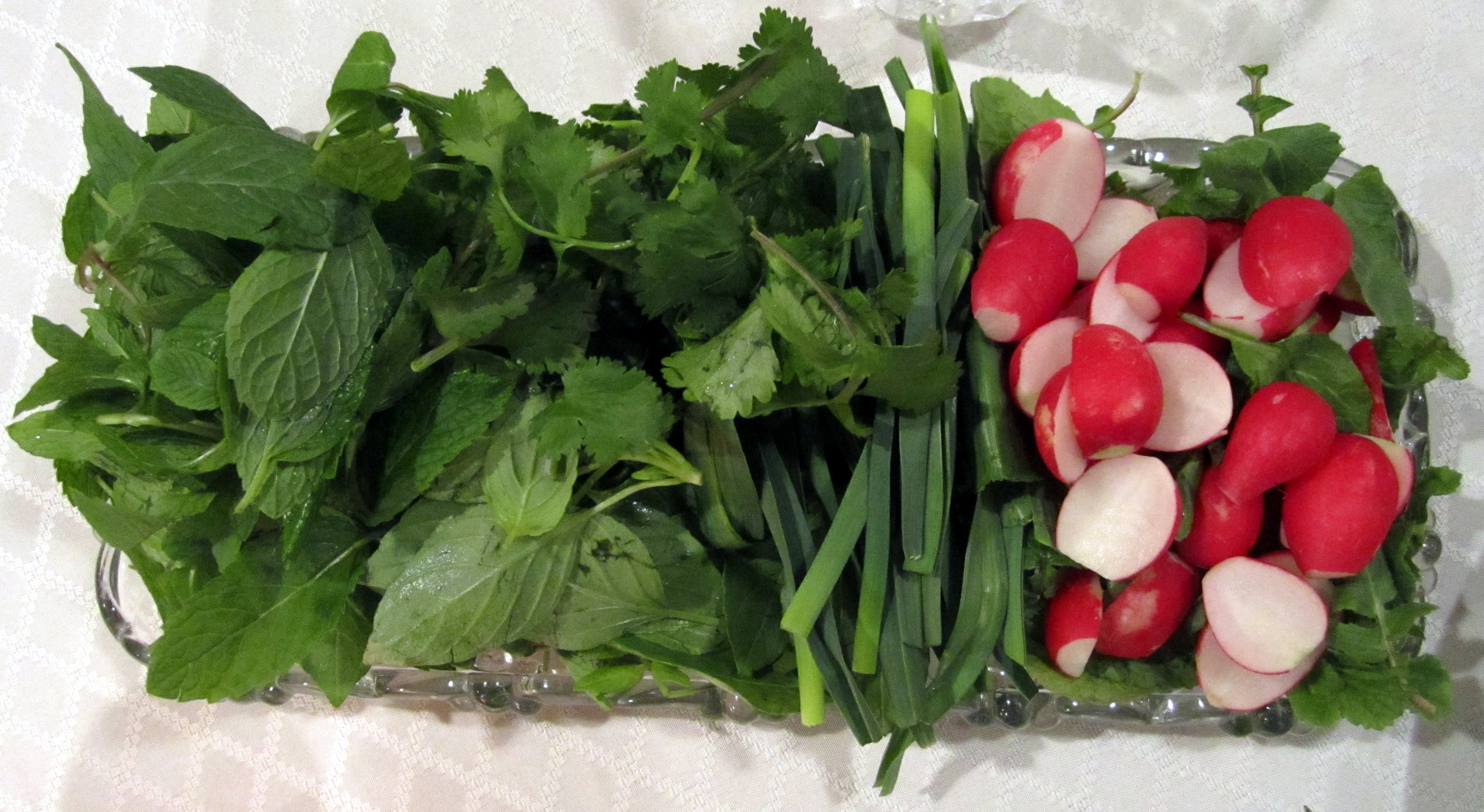
- Armenian kanachi with mint, parsley, young leek leaves, and radish
- Alternative names: Kanachi, goy, pinjar
- Type: Side dish
- Region or state: Iran, Armenia, Kurdistan, Azerbaijan
- Main ingredients: Fresh herbs and raw vegetables

Sabzi khordan (Persian: سبزی خوردن), kanachi (Armenian: կանաչի), goy (Azerbaijani: Göy-göyərti), or pinjar (Kurdish: pinçar) is a common side dish in Iranian, Armenian, Azerbaijani and Kurdish cuisines, which may be served with any meal, consisting of any combination of a set of fresh herbs and raw vegetables. Basil or purple basil, mint, parsley, tarragon, coriander, leek and radishes are among the most common ones.

Most commonly it is served alongside the actual meal. It is sometimes served with cheese (chechil, motal, lighvan, paneer) and bread (lavash, sangak, naan, barbari, tonir bread), as well as walnuts and condiments (ajika, lecho, pomegranade molasses, grape syrup), to prepare a loqmeh (Persian: لقمه; meaning "roll up bite"), which is colloquially called Naan panir sabzi (نان پنیر سبزی), or an Armenian brduch (Armenian: բրդուճ) which is a wrap made using lavash and aforementioned ingredients.

A list of the vegetables used in sabzi khordan is as follows:

List of the names of the ingredients of sabzi khordan
English	Armenian	Persian	Azerbaijani	Scientific name
Basil	ռեհան rehān	ریحان reyhān	reyhan	Ocimum basilicum
Cilantro	համեմ hāmem	گشنیز gishnīz	kişniş	Coriandrum sativum
Cress	կոտեմ kotem	شاهی shāhī, ترتیزک tartizak, etc.	vəzəri	Lepidium sativum
Dill	սամիթ sāmit	شوید shevīd	şüyüd	Anthemum graveolens
Fenugreek	հացհամեմ hātshāmem	شنبلیله shambalīleh	güldəfnə	Trigonella foenum-graecum
Leek chives	պրաս prās	تره tareh	pırasa	Allium ampeloprasum var. persicum
Mint	նանա nānā	نعناع na'nā'	nanə	Mentha spicata
Parsley	մաղադանոս māghādānos	جعفری ja'farī	cəfəri	Petroselinum crispum
Persian shallot	շալոտ shālot	موسیر mūsīr	hövsan soğanı	Allium stipitatum (Allium hirtifolium)
Radish	բողկ boghk	تربچه torobcheh	turp	Raphanus sativus
Savory (summer savory?)	ծիթրոն tsitron	مرزه marzeh	çölnanəsi	Satureja
Scallion	կանաչ սոխ kanach sokh	پیازچه piyāzcheh	yaşıl soğan	Allium fistulosum
Tarragon	թարխուն tārkhūn	ترخون tarkhūn	tərxun	Artemisia dracunculus

== Gallery ==
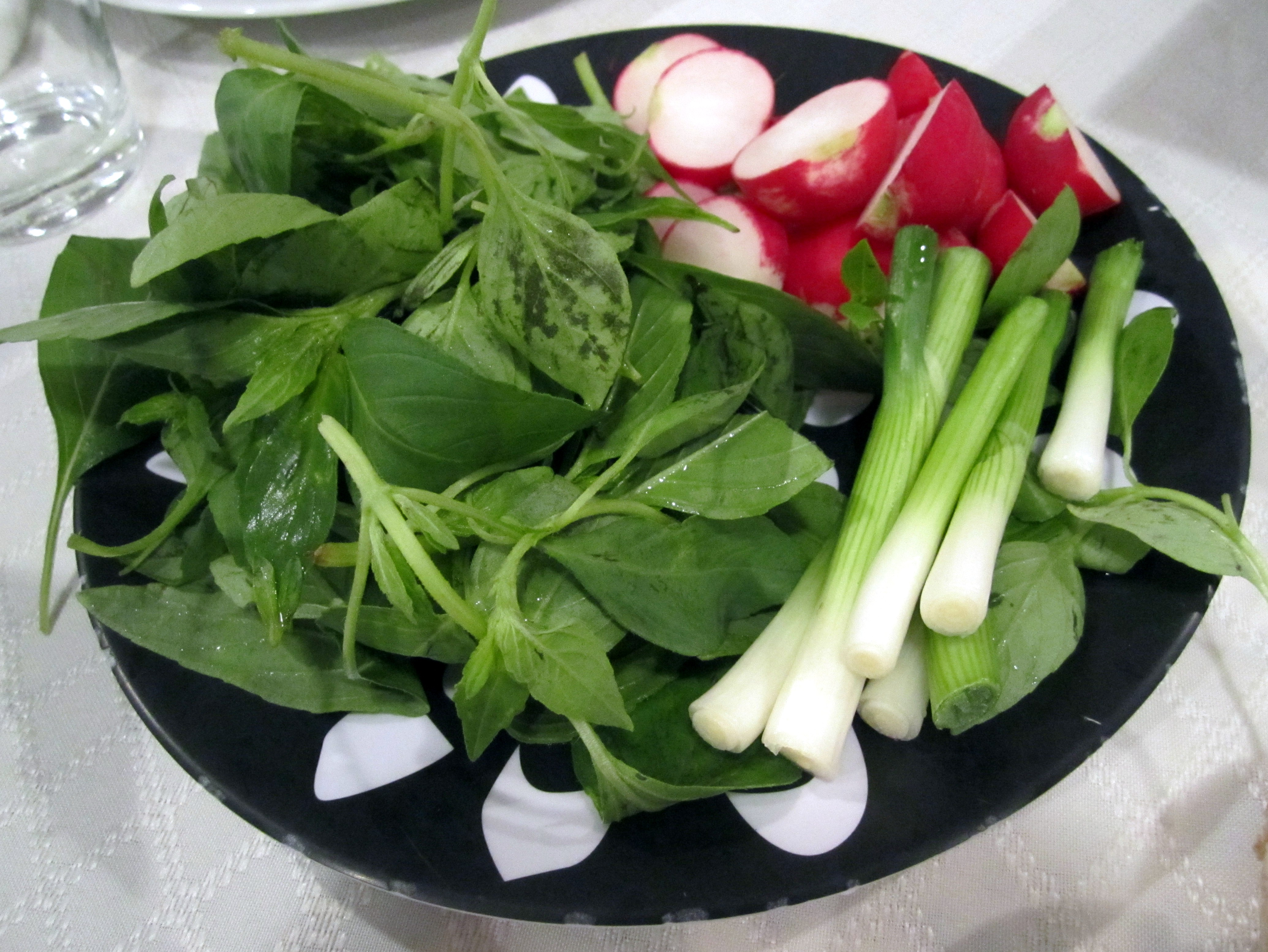
Basil, green onions, and raddish

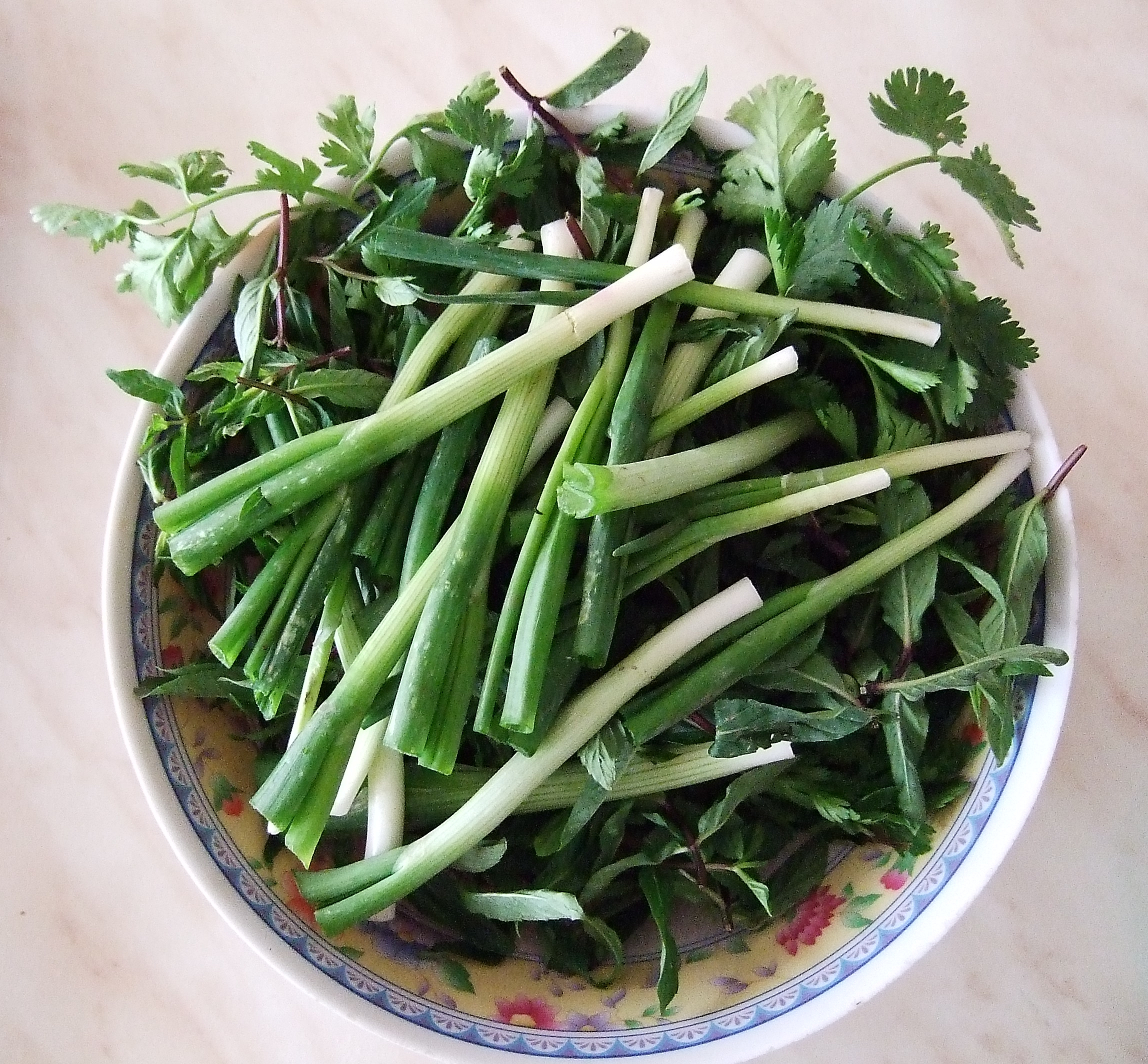
Mint, parsley, and green onions

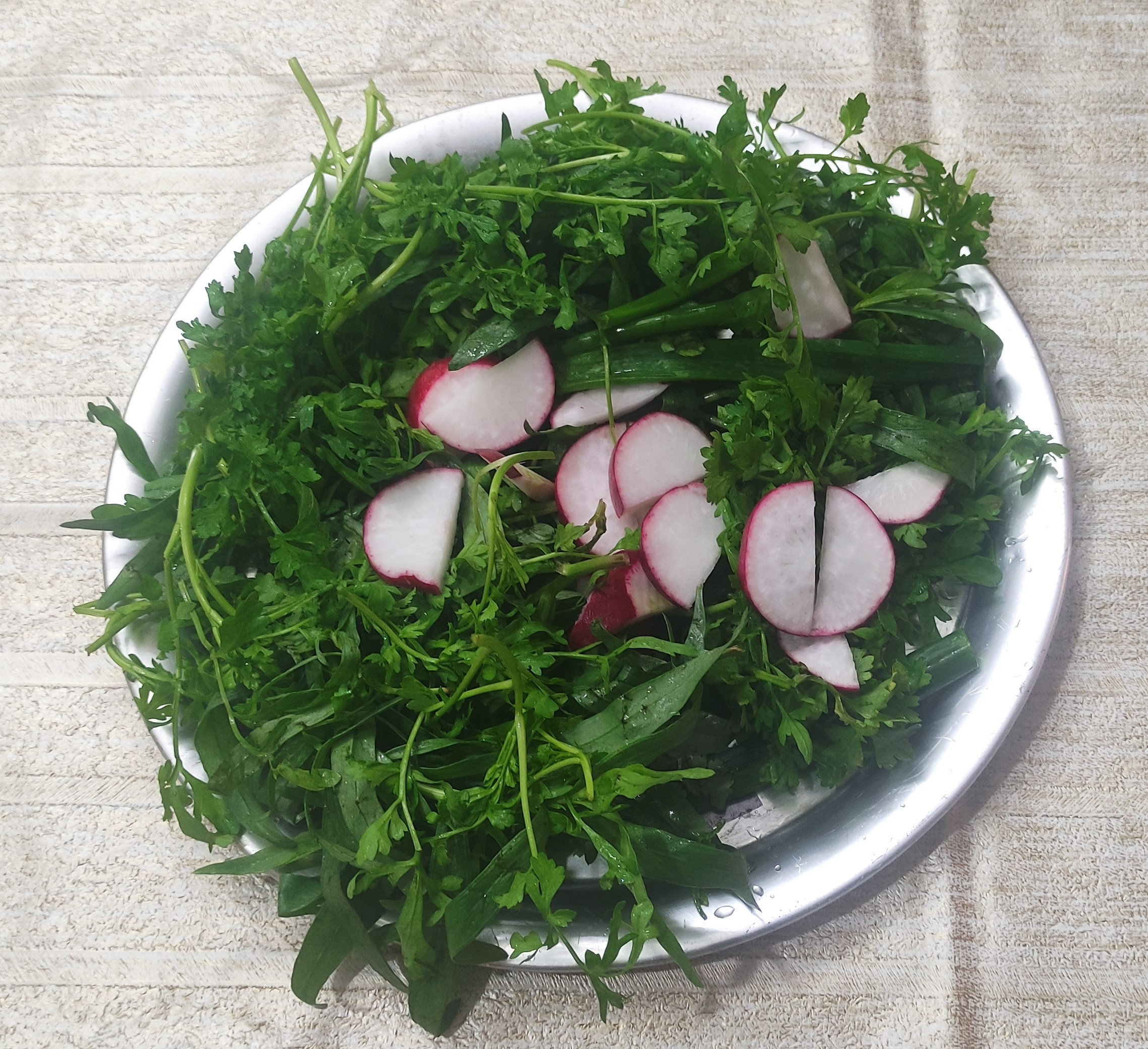
Parsley, coriander, green onions, Tarragon and raddish

== See also ==
- List of salads
