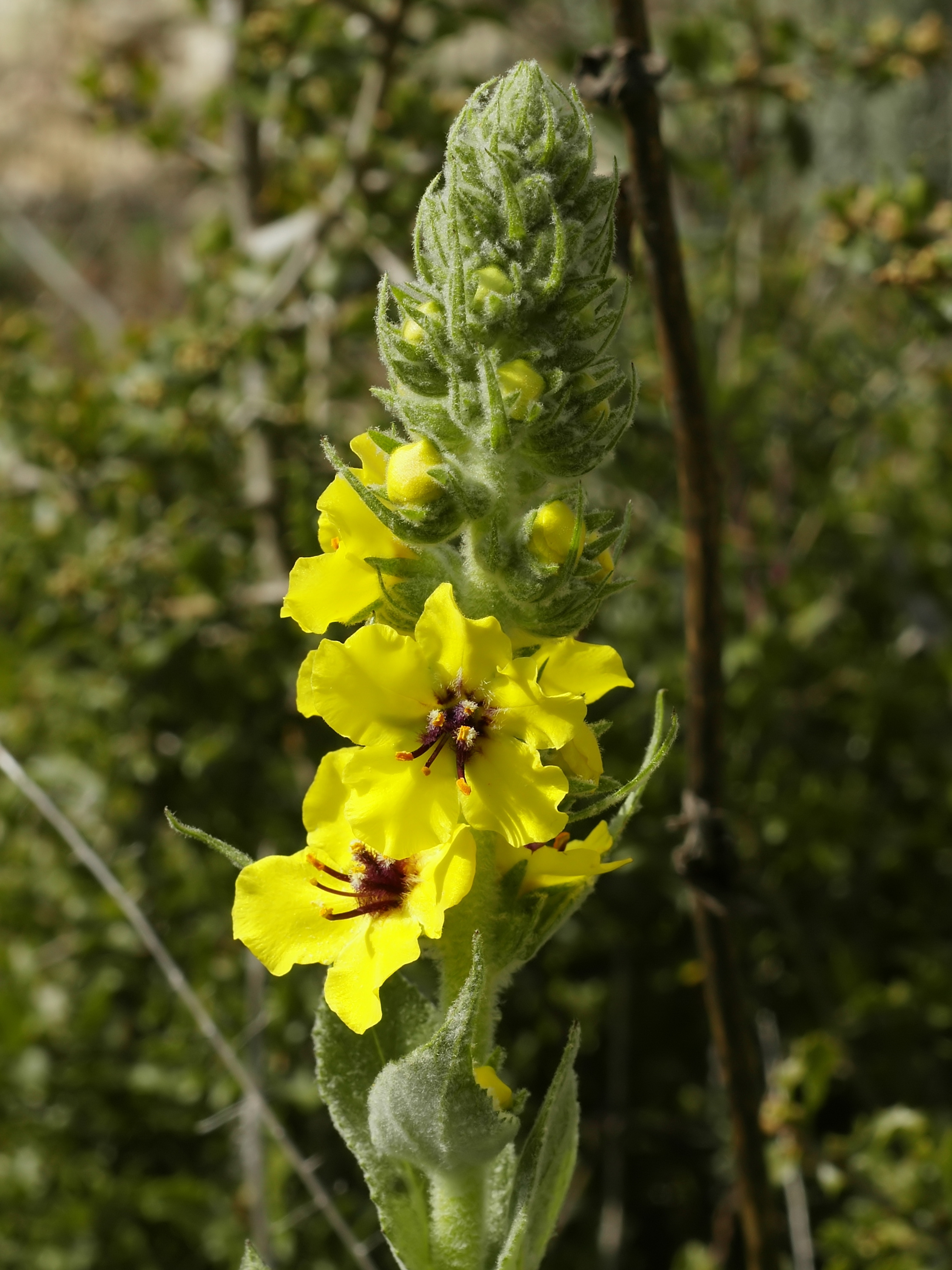
- Inflorescence

Scientific classification
- Kingdom: Plantae
- Clade: Tracheophytes
- Clade: Angiosperms
- Clade: Eudicots
- Clade: Asterids
- Order: Lamiales
- Family: Scrophulariaceae
- Genus: Verbascum
- Species: V. boerhavii

Binomial name
- Verbascum boerhavii L.

Synonyms
- List: Lychnitis boerhavii (L.) Fourr.; Verbascum bicolor Badarò; Verbascum boerhavii var. knochei Benedí, Orell & J.J.Orell; Verbascum elongatum Moench; Verbascum luteum Mill.; Verbascum majale DC.

= Verbascum boerhavii =

Species of flowering plant in the figwort family

Verbascum boerhavii, the annual mullein, is a species of flowering plant in the family Scrophulariaceae, native to Spain (including the Balearic Islands), France (including Corsica), and Italy. It has been traditionally used as a treatment for haemorrhoids. It contains the phenylpropanoid glycoside poliumoside, which has an affinity for metalloproteinases.

== Common names ==
- Castilian: gordolobo, gordolobo tempranero, hoja de lobo, hoja de oso, proras, torpas.
- English: mullein, early mullein, wolf blade, bear leaf, proras, clumsiness.
