= Dianol =

Chemical compound

Identifiers
- IUPAC name: 4-[(1E)-3-(4-Hydroxyphenyl)-2-methylpent-1-en-1-yl]phenol
- CAS Number: 1365640-31-8
- ChemSpider: 129557827

Chemical and physical data
- Formula: C_{18}H_{20}O_{2}
- Molar mass: 268.356 g·mol^{−1}
- 3D model (JSmol): Interactive image
- SMILES: CCC(\C(C)=C\C1=CC=C(O)C=C1)C1=CC=C(O)C=C1
- InChI: InChI=1/C18H20O2/c1-3-18(15-6-10-17(20)11-7-15)13(2)12-14-4-8-16(19)9-5-14/h4-12,18-20H,3H2,1-2H3/b13-12+; Key:LYDGPZXLJYBDEM-OUKQBFOZNA-N

Dianol is a synthetic, nonsteroidal estrogen that was never marketed. It is a dimer and impurity of anol, and was, along with hexestrol, involved in erroneous findings of highly potent estrogenic activity with anol. Although a potent estrogen, it requires a dose of 100 μg to show activity, whereas hexestrol shows activity with a mere dose of 0.2 μg.

== See also ==
- Anethole
- Dianethole
- Diethylstilbestrol
- Stilbestrol
