= Photoanethole =

Names
- IUPAC name 1-Methoxy-4-[(E)-2-(4-methoxyphenyl)ethenyl]benzene
- Other names Bianisal; Bianisylidene; p,p′-Dimethoxystilbene; 4,4′-Dimethoxystilbene

Identifiers
CAS Number	15638-14-9; 4705-34-4 (non-specific)
3D model (JSmol)	Interactive image
ChemSpider	556587
PubChem CID	641296
UNII	AME9HMB99F
- InChI: InChI=1S/C16H16O2/c1-17-15-9-5-13(6-10-15)3-4-14-7-11-16(18-2)12-8-14/h3-12H,1-2H3/b4-3+ Key: CAWFCZIEFIQKRV-ONEGZZNKSA-N
- SMILES: COC1=CC=C(C=C1)/C=C/C2=CC=C(C=C2)OC

Properties
Chemical formula	C_{16}H_{16}O_{2}
Molar mass	240.302 g·mol^{−1}
- Except where otherwise noted, data are given for materials in their standard state (at 25 °C [77 °F], 100 kPa). Infobox references

Photoanethole is a naturally occurring organic compound that is found in anise and fennel. It has estrogenic activity, and along with anethole and dianethole, may be responsible for the estrogenic effects of anise and fennel. These compounds bear resemblance to the estrogens stilbene and diethylstilbestrol, which may explain their estrogenic activity. In fact, it is said that diethylstilbestrol and related drugs were originally modeled after photoanethole and dianethole.

== See also ==
- Anol
- Hexestrol
