= Anethole trithione =

Chemical compound

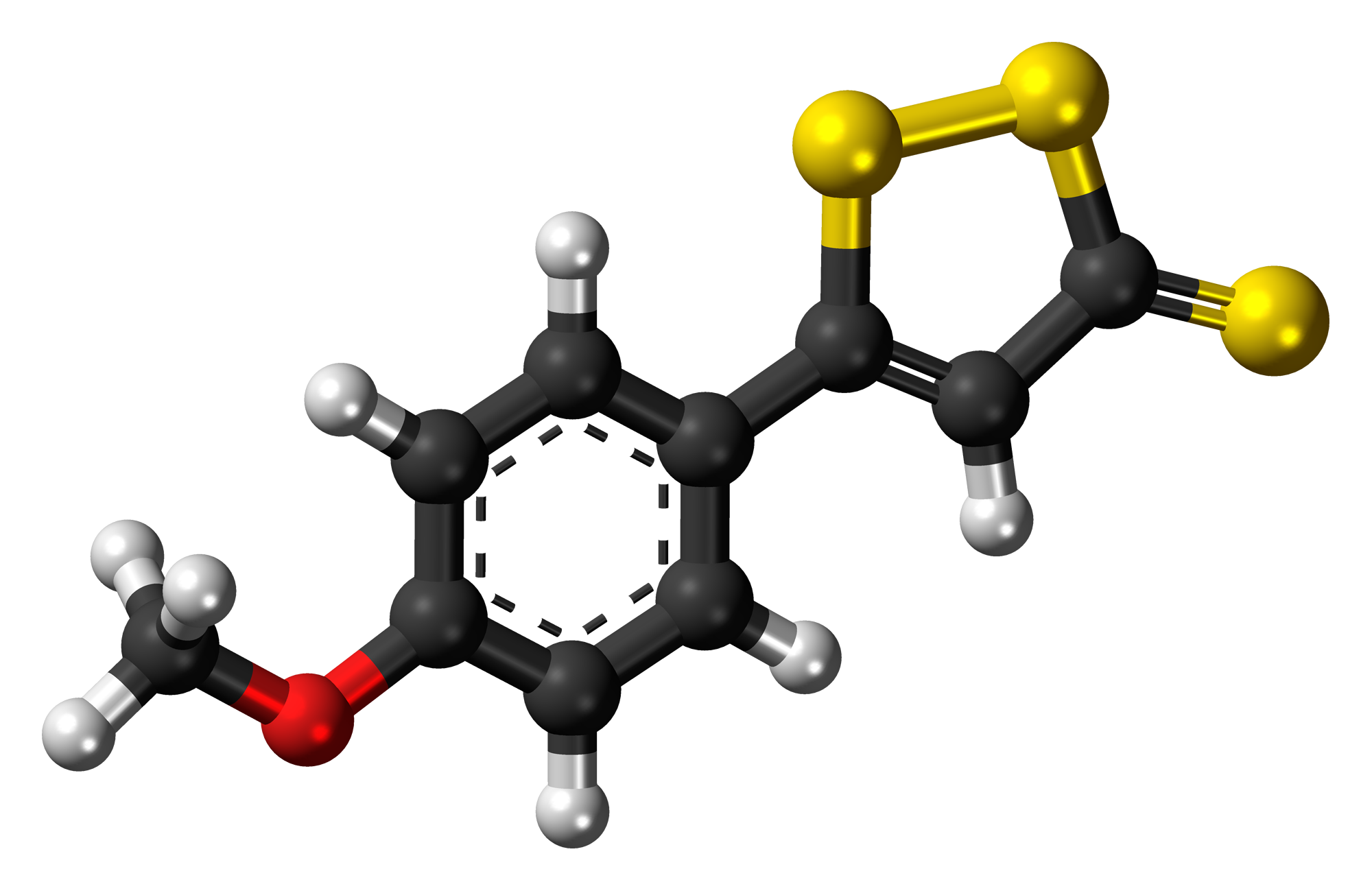

Clinical data
- ATC code: A16AX02 (WHO)

Identifiers
- IUPAC name: 5-(4-methoxyphenyl)-3H-1,2-dithiole-3-thione
- CAS Number: 532-11-6
- PubChem CID: 2194
- DrugBank: DB13853
- ChemSpider: 2109
- UNII: QUY32964DJ
- KEGG: D01584
- ChEMBL: ChEMBL178862
- CompTox Dashboard (EPA): DTXSID9046651
- ECHA InfoCard: 100.007.754

Chemical and physical data
- Formula: C_{10}H_{8}OS_{3}
- Molar mass: 240.35 g·mol^{−1}
- 3D model (JSmol): Interactive image
- SMILES: S=C\2SS/C(c1ccc(OC)cc1)=C/2
- InChI: InChI=1S/C10H8OS3/c1-11-8-4-2-7(3-5-8)9-6-10(12)14-13-9/h2-6H,1H3; Key:KYLIZBIRMBGUOP-UHFFFAOYSA-N

Anethole trithione, anetholtrithione, or anetholtrithion (JAN) is a drug used in the treatment of dry mouth. It is listed in the U.S. National Cancer Institute's Dictionary of Cancer Terms as being studied in the treatment of cancer. Anethole trithione is an organosulfur compound, specifically, a dithiole-thione derivative.

== Brand names ==
- Felviten
- Halpen
- Hepasulfol - Franco-Indian Pharmaceuticals
- Heporal
- Mucinol - Sanofi-Aventis
- Sialor - Paladin Laboratories; Pharmascience; Solvay; Zuoz Pharma
- Sonicur - Solvay
- Sulfarlem - Solvay; Aguettant; Edward Keller; Sanofi-Aventis
- Sulfarlem S - EG Labo
- Tiopropen
- Tiotrifar

== See also ==
- Anethole
