= Fino verde basil =

Cultivar of sweet basil

Fino verde basil is a cultivar of Ocimum basilicum (sweet basil). Some sources list Fino verde as a synonym for spicy globe basil, while others list it as a separate variety. Fino verde grows as a small, dense bush, suitable for gardening or pots. The leaves are much smaller than those of most basils. The flavor is similar to that of sweet basil, but stronger and spicier. The leaves are easy to use in cooking because they can be used twigs and all, unlike basils with larger leaves.
