= Paracoumaryl alcohol =

Names
- Preferred IUPAC name 4-[(1E)-3-Hydroxyprop-1-en-1-yl]phenol
- Other names p-coumaryl alcohol, 4-coumaryl alcohol, 4-hydroxycinnamyl alcohol, 4-(3-hydroxy-1-propenyl)phenol

Identifiers
CAS Number	20649-40-5
3D model (JSmol)	Interactive image
ChEBI	CHEBI:64555
ChEMBL	ChEMBL109034
ChemSpider	4444166
KEGG	C02646
PubChem CID	5280535
UNII	61POZ1QQ11
CompTox Dashboard (EPA)	DTXSID50895024
- InChI: InChI=1S/C9H10O2/c10-7-1-2-8-3-5-9(11)6-4-8/h1-6,10-11H,7H2/b2-1+ Key: PTNLHDGQWUGONS-OWOJBTEDSA-N; InChI=1/C9H10O2/c10-7-1-2-8-3-5-9(11)6-4-8/h1-6,10-11H,7H2/b2-1+ Key: PTNLHDGQWUGONS-OWOJBTEDBL
- SMILES: OC/C=C/c1ccc(O)cc1

Properties
Chemical formula	C_{9}H_{10}O_{2}
Molar mass	150.1745
Appearance	White solid
Melting point	114–116 °C (237–241 °F; 387–389 K)
- Except where otherwise noted, data are given for materials in their standard state (at 25 °C [77 °F], 100 kPa). verify (what is ?) Infobox references

Paracoumaryl alcohol is a phytochemical, one of the monolignols. It is a white solid. p-Coumaryl alcohol is a major precursor to lignin or lignans.

== Biosynthesis and occurrence ==
It is synthesized via the phenylpropanoid biochemical pathway.

Esters of p-coumaryl alcohol and fatty acids are the basis of epicuticular waxes covering the surfaces of apples.

p-Coumaryl alcohol is an intermediate in biosynthesis of chavicol, stilbenoids, and coumarin.
