= Nufar basil =

Variety of sweet basil

Nufar basil (Ocimum basilicum 'Nufar') is the first variety of sweet basil (O. basilicum) that is resistant to fusarium wilt. Fusarium wilt is a disease that causes sudden wilting and death in multiple species, including basil. It is caused by the fungus Fusarium oxysporum f. sp. basilicum, which attacks the xylem in the stem, blocking water uptake and leading to a characteristic sudden leaf wilt that does not respond to watering. Nufar basil is resistant to fusarium wilt, remaining asymptomatic even when infected. It was released in 1999 in Israel by the breeders of the Agricultural Research Organization, and commercialized by Genesis Seeds.

The first resistant germ plasm was identified in Israel, by Reuveni et al. 1997 (3), Agricultural Research Organization, in several basil plants of a local variety that originally introduced from the United States and reselected in Israel for resistance to Fusarium oxysporum f. sp. basilicum. Seeds were planted in the greenhouse in naturally highly infested soil and symptomless plants that survived in naturally infested soil were the source for F1 seeds of resistant germ plasm. Further selection tests to improve resistance were conducted up to additional generations in infested soil in the greenhouse. All individuals of the present genetic line remained symptomless, while all individual plants of the original susceptible cultivar defoliated 3 weeks after planting into infested soil, suggesting that the resistance may be a single, dominant gene.

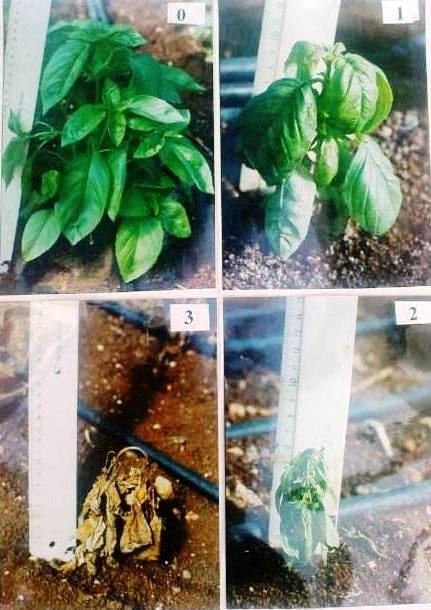
NUFAR - a sweet basil cultivar resistant to Fusarium oxysporum f.sp. basilicum - several stages in resistance tests

== See also ==
- Agricultural Research In Israel
