= Phenylpropanoid =

Any organic aromatic compound with a structure based on a phenylpropane skeleton

4-Coumaroyl-CoA is the central biosynthetic precursor to phenylpropanoids (shown in protonated state)

Phenylalanine

Tyrosine

The phenylpropanoids are a diverse family of organic compounds that are biosynthesized by plants from the amino acids phenylalanine and tyrosine in the shikimic acid pathway. Their name is derived from the six-carbon, aromatic phenyl group and the three-carbon propene tail of coumaric acid, which is the central intermediate in phenylpropanoid biosynthesis. From 4-coumaroyl-CoA emanates the biosynthesis of myriad natural products including lignols (precursors to lignin and lignocellulose), flavonoids, isoflavonoids, coumarins, aurones, stilbenes, catechin, and phenylpropanoids. The coumaroyl component is produced from cinnamic acid.

Phenylpropanoids are found throughout the plant kingdom, where they serve as essential components of a number of structural polymers, provide protection from ultraviolet light, defend against herbivores and pathogens, and also mediate plant-pollinator interactions as floral pigments and scent compounds.

== Hydroxycinnamic acids ==
Cinnamic acid

Phenylalanine is first converted to cinnamic acid by the action of the enzyme phenylalanine ammonia-lyase (PAL). Some plants, mainly monocotyledonous, use tyrosine to synthesize p-coumaric acid by the action of the bifunctional enzyme phenylalanine/tyrosine ammonia-lyase (PTAL). A series of enzymatic hydroxylations and methylations leads to coumaric acid, caffeic acid, ferulic acid, 5-hydroxyferulic acid, and sinapic acid. Conversion of these acids to their corresponding esters produces some of the volatile components of herb and flower fragrances, which serve many functions such as attracting pollinators. Ethyl cinnamate is a common example.

== Cinnamic aldehydes and monolignols ==
Coniferyl alcohol

Reduction of the carboxylic acid functional groups in the cinnamic acids provides the corresponding aldehydes, such as cinnamaldehyde. Further reduction provides monolignols including coumaryl alcohol, coniferyl alcohol, and sinapyl alcohol, which vary only in their degree of methoxylation. The monolignols are monomers that are polymerized to generate various forms of lignin and suberin, which are used as a structural component of plant cell walls.

Safrole

The phenylpropenes, phenylpropanoids with allylbenzene (3-phenylpropene) as the parent compound, are also derived from the monolignols. Examples include eugenol, chavicol, safrole, and estragole. These compounds are the primary constituents of various essential oils.

== Coumarins and flavonoids ==
Umbelliferone

Hydroxylation of cinnamic acid in the 4-position by trans-cinnamate 4-monooxygenase leads to p-coumaric acid, which can be further modified into hydroxylated derivatives such as umbelliferone. Another use of p-coumaric acid via its thioester with coenzyme A, i.e. 4-coumaroyl-CoA, is the production of chalcones. This is achieved with the addition of three malonyl-CoA molecules and their cyclization into a second phenyl group. Chalcones are the precursors of all flavonoids, a diverse class of phytochemicals.

== Stilbenoids ==
trans-resveratrol

Stilbenoids, such as resveratrol, are hydroxylated derivatives of stilbene. They are formed through an alternative cyclization of cinnamoyl-CoA or 4-coumaroyl-CoA.

== Sporopollenin ==
Phenylpropanoids and other phenolics are part of the chemical composition of sporopollenin. It is related to cutin and suberin. This ill-defined substance found in pollen is unusually resistant to degradation. Analyses have revealed a mixture of biopolymers, containing mainly hydroxylated fatty acids, phenylpropanoids, phenolics and traces of carotenoids. Tracer experiments have shown that phenylalanine is a major precursor, but other carbon sources also contribute. It is likely that sporopollenin is derived from several precursors that are chemically cross-linked to form a rigid structure.

== See also ==
- Apiole
- Asarone
- Chavicol
- Dillapiole
- Elemicin
- Estragole
- Eugenol
- Methyl eugenol
- Myristicin
- PiHKAL § Essential amphetamines
- Eleutherosides
