= Butyramide =

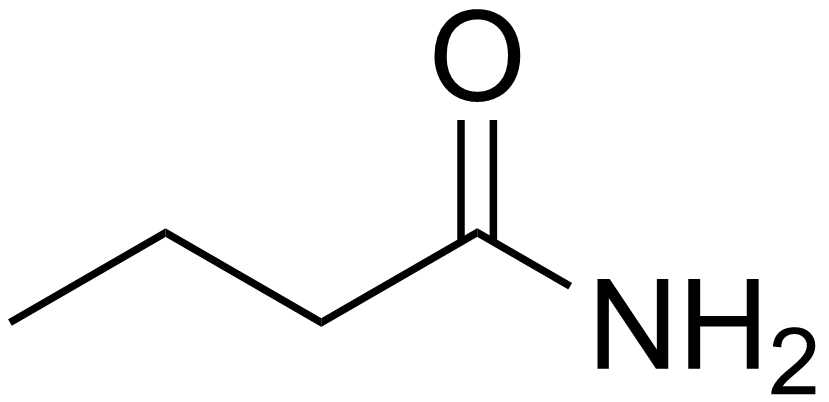
- Skeletal formula

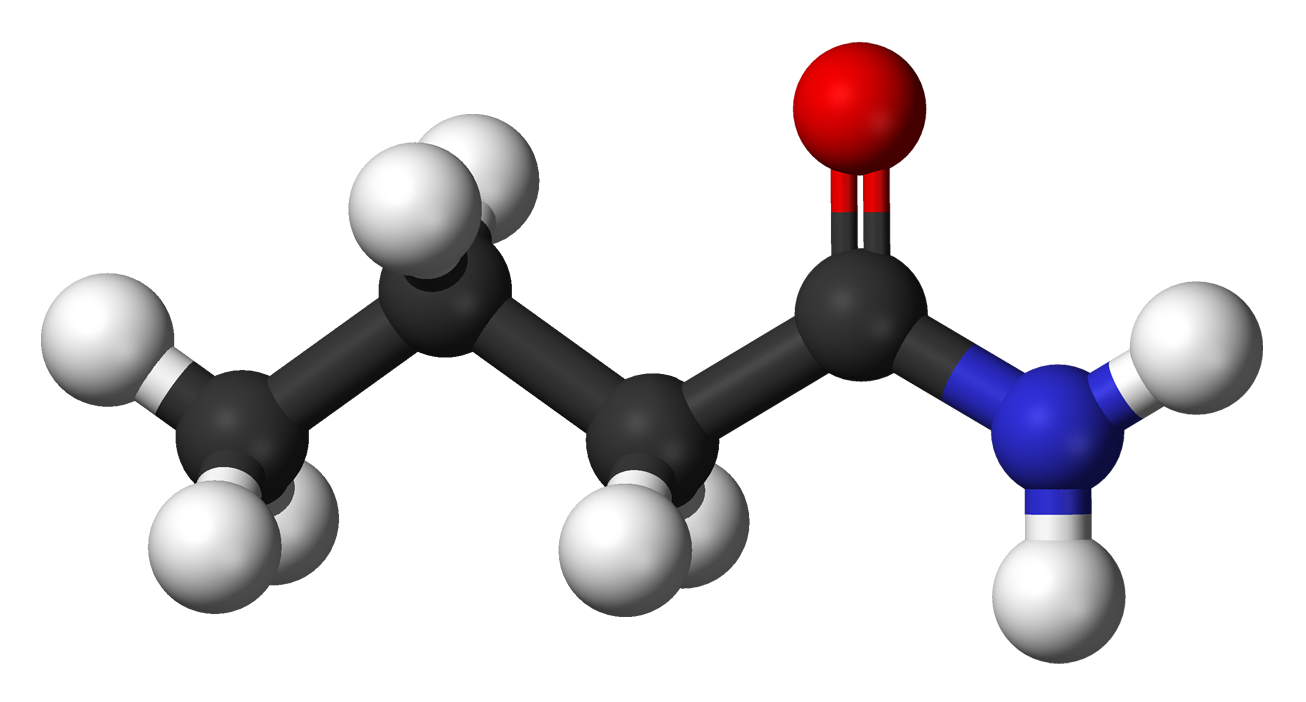
- Ball-and-stick model

Names
- Preferred IUPAC name Butanamide
- Other names Butyramide n-Butanamide

Identifiers
CAS Number	541-35-5
3D model (JSmol)	Interactive image; Interactive image
ChEBI	CHEBI:50724
ChemSpider	10464
DrugBank	DB02121
ECHA InfoCard	100.007.980
PubChem CID	10927
UNII	9J6OR937VR
CompTox Dashboard (EPA)	DTXSID8060248
- InChI: InChI=1S/C4H9NO/c1-2-3-4(5)6/h2-3H2,1H3,(H2,5,6) Key: DNSISZSEWVHGLH-UHFFFAOYSA-N; InChI=1/C4H9NO/c1-2-3-4(5)6/h2-3H2,1H3,(H2,5,6) Key: DNSISZSEWVHGLH-UHFFFAOYAW
- SMILES: CCCC(N)=O; O=C(N)CCC

Properties
Chemical formula	C_{4}H_{9}NO
Molar mass	87.122 g·mol^{−1}
Density	1.03 g/cm^{3}
Melting point	115 to 116 °C (239 to 241 °F; 388 to 389 K)
Boiling point	216 °C (421 °F; 489 K)
- Except where otherwise noted, data are given for materials in their standard state (at 25 °C [77 °F], 100 kPa). verify (what is ?) Infobox references

Butyramide is the amide of butyric acid. It has the molecular formula C_{3}H_{7}CONH_{2}. It is a white solid that is freely soluble in water and ethanol, but slightly soluble in diethyl ether. At room temperature, butyramide is a crystalline solid and in contrast to butyric acid, it is devoid of an unpleasant, rancid smell.

== Synthesis ==
Butyramide can be synthesized by:

- catalytic hydration of butyronitrile;
- reaction of butyryl chloride with ammonium salts;
- reduction of butyraldoxime.

== Derivatives ==
Some of its derivatives have shown preliminary strong anticonvulsive activity and inhibitory action on histone deacetylases, which are crucial enzymes controlling the proliferative or differentiation status of most cells.

== See also ==
- Isobutyramide
