= Sweet Dani basil =

Sweet Dani basil is a stable hybrid sweet basil cultivar developed at Purdue University by James E. Simon and Mario Morales. The cultivar was developed as a research project, by growing a large variety of basils, gathering their seeds, mixing them in a paper bag, and seeing what emerged. The most interesting plants were then isolated, and their seeds collected. The name is a reference to Daniella Simon, daughter of Dr. James E. Simon. The variety was an All-American Selection in 1998, and is now available commercially.
