= Monolignol =

Structures of the three commonly occurring monolignols

Monolignols, also called lignols, are the source materials for biosynthesis of both lignans and lignin and consist mainly of paracoumaryl alcohol (H), coniferyl alcohol (G) and sinapyl alcohol (S). These monolignols differ in their degree of methoxylation of the aromatic ring.

The monolignols are derived from the amino acid phenylalanine via the phenylpropanoid pathway involving various enzymes. Phenylalanine is first converted to paracoumaryl alcohol (H), which is subsequently elaborated to coniferyl alcohol (G) and sinapyl alcohol (S). This reaction happens in the cytosol, while the polymerization of the monolignols occurs in the apoplast to which the monolignols have to be transported through the cell membrane. The monolignols have been found as monolignol-4-O-β-d-glucosides, which might be their major way of storage. Another theory for this conversion is that is improving the transportation of the monolignols. The polymerization consists of oxidative coupling reactions, which occur between the propenyl substituents, two aromatic rings or a propenyl substituent and a ring. The difference between lignans and lignin is the number of monolignols they are composed of. Lignans are typically dimers and therefore soluble and susceptible to biodegradation. Lignin is a polymer with an inert nature that forms the structures of woody plants.

The ratio of the three monolignols as well as their linkages varies depending on the plant species. For example, Norway spruce lignin is almost entirely derived from coniferyl alcohol, whereas paracoumaryl alcohol is the main monomer of lignin in grasses. Even within one plant, the monomer composition of lignin can vary depending on the part of the plant and other phenolic compounds can be found as monomers in lignin.

The phenylpropenes are derived from the monolignols.
