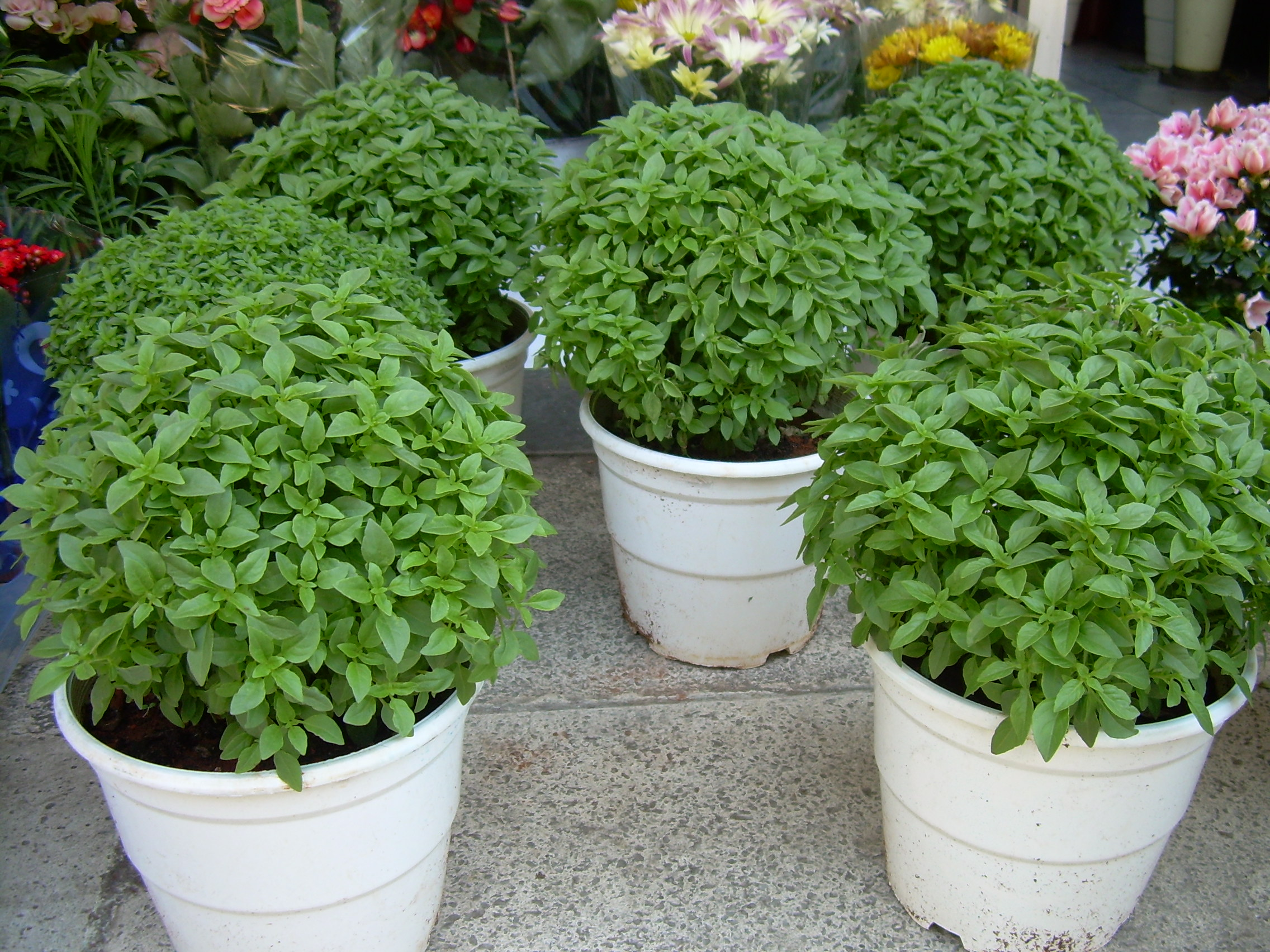

Scientific classification
- Kingdom: Plantae
- Clade: Tracheophytes
- Clade: Angiosperms
- Clade: Eudicots
- Clade: Asterids
- Order: Lamiales
- Family: Lamiaceae
- Genus: Ocimum
- Species: O. basilicum
- Variety: O. b. var. minimum

Trinomial name
- Ocimum basilicum var. minimum L.

= Ocimum basilicum var. minimum =

Variety of basil

Greek basil (UK: /ˈbæzəl/, US: /ˈbeɪzəl/; Ocimum basilicum var. minimum) is a flowering herb and cultivar of basil.

== Etymology ==
The name "basil" comes from Latin, basilius, and Greek βασιλικόν φυτόν (basilikón phutón), meaning "royal/kingly plant".

== Culinary use ==
The Chinese also use fresh or dried basils in soups and other foods. In Taiwan, people add fresh basil leaves to thick soups. They also eat fried chicken with deep-fried basil leaves. Basil (most commonly Thai basil) is commonly steeped in cream or milk to create an interesting flavor in ice cream or chocolates (such as truffles). The leaves are not the only part of basil used in culinary applications, the flower buds have a more subtle flavor and they are edible.

== Chemical components ==
The Greek basil and various other basils have such different scents because the herb has a number of different essential oils in different proportions for various cultivars. The essential oil from European basil contains high concentrations of linalool and methyl chavicol (estragole), in a ratio of about 3:1. Other constituents include: 1,8-cineole, eugenol, and myrcene, among others. The clove scent of sweet basil is derived from eugenol. The aroma profile of basil includes 1,8-cineole and methyl eugenol.

== Cultivation ==
Annual herbs can be planted in the garden in spring. Annual herbs are also ideal for containers. Pots can be brought indoors for the winter and placed near a sunny window for harvesting through the cold months. Return the plants outdoors in the spring when the danger of frost is past, or simply replace with fresh plants.

== Culture ==
Many people in Greece avoid eating basil because of its association with a religious event known as the "Elevation of the Cross". There are no set religious-related rules against eating this herb, but many Greek Orthodox Christians avoid it as part of their personal or family religious practice. According to the story, Empress Helene in 326 A.D. went looking for the wood of the cross that Jesus was crucified on. When she found it, basil was growing in the earth in the shape of a cross. She named the plant "Vasiliki", or basil, which means, "of the king."

=== Folk medicine ===
In folk medicine practices, such as those of Ayurveda or traditional Chinese medicine, basil is thought to have therapeutic properties.
