= Spicy globe basil =

Basil cultivar

Ocimum basilicum var. minimum 'Spicy Globe'
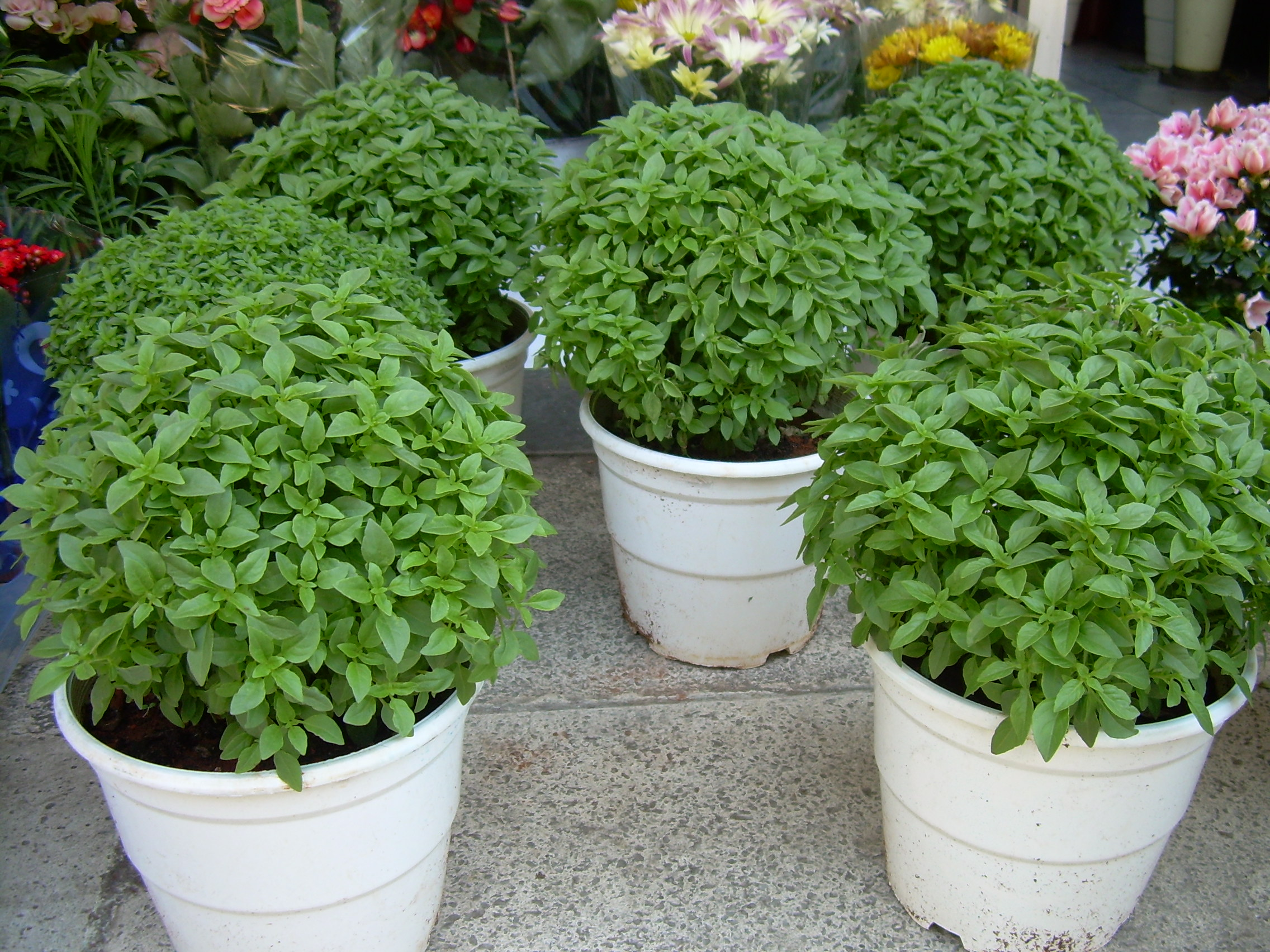
- Genus: Ocimum
- Species: basilicum
- Variety: minimum
- Cultivar: Spicy Globe

Spicy globe basil (Ocimum basilicum var. minimum 'Spicy Globe') is a selected cultivar of Ocimum basilicum var. minimum (Greek basil). Unlike some better known basils, it grows in the form of a tidy, compact bush, more suitable for gardens and small pots than most varieties. The small, densely growing leaves are used in the same way as the leaves of other sweet basil varieties.
