= Magical Michael =

Cultivar of sweet basil

Magical Michael basil is a cultivar of Ocimum basilicum (sweet basil). The plants reliably grow to 15 inches tall and 16–17 inches wide. This degree of uniformity is unusual in basil varieties. The flowers of the plant are also unusual, with purple calyxes and white corollas. The flavor is similar to sweet basil. Magical Michael is a past winner of the All-American Selection award.
