= Dianethole =

Names
- IUPAC name 1-Methoxy-4-[(4E)-5-(4-methoxyphenyl)-4-methylpent-4-en-2-yl]benzene

Identifiers
3D model (JSmol)	Interactive image
PubChem CID	165360102
CompTox Dashboard (EPA)	DTXSID401336038
- InChI: InChI=1S/C19H22O2/c1-15(17-9-13-19(21-3)14-10-17)5-4-6-16-7-11-18(20-2)12-8-16/h4,6-15H,5H2,1-3H3 Key: NWLMIETUAKULHS-UHFFFAOYSA-N
- SMILES: C1=CC(=CC=C1C(C)CC=CC2=CC=C(C=C2)OC)OC

Properties
Chemical formula	C_{19}H_{22}O_{2}
Molar mass	282.3768 g/mol
- Except where otherwise noted, data are given for materials in their standard state (at 25 °C [77 °F], 100 kPa). Infobox references

Dianethole is a naturally occurring organic compound that is found in anise and fennel. It is a dimeric polymer of anethole. It has estrogenic activity, and along with anethole and photoanethole, may be responsible for the estrogenic effects of anise and fennel. These compounds bear resemblance to the estrogens stilbene and diethylstilbestrol, which may explain their estrogenic activity. In fact, it is said that diethylstilbestrol and related drugs were originally modeled after dianethole and photoanethole.

== See also ==
- Anol
- Hexestrol
