= Committee on Herbal Medicinal Products =

European Medicines Agency committee

The Committee on Herbal Medicinal Products (HMPC), is the European Medicines Agency's committee responsible for elaborating the agency's opinions on herbal medicines.

== Role ==
HMPC aims at assisting in the harmonization of procedures and provisions concerning herbal medicinal products within the European Union, and further integrating herbal medicinal products in the European regulatory framework. HMPC provides EU Member States and European institutions with its scientific opinion on questions relating to herbal medicinal products. Other core tasks include the establishment of a draft 'Community list of herbal substances, preparations and combinations thereof for use in traditional herbal medicinal products', as well as the establishment of Community herbal monographs.

== Composition ==
- 28 members, one nominated by each of the 28 EU Member States
- a chair, elected by serving HMPC members
- 2 members nominated by Iceland and Norway
- Up to 5 additional members may be co-opted. Currently (March 2018) co-opted members have expertise in experimental/non-clinical pharmacology, toxicology, paediatric medicine, general and family medicine.

The HMPC has observer from the European Directorate for the Quality of Medicines (EDQM).
