= Osmin purple basil =

Basil variety

Basil Osmin Purple
- Species: Ocimum basilicum
- Cultivar: Osmin Purple

Osmin purple basil is a cultivar of Ocimum basilicum (sweet basil) with dark purple leaves. It is distinguished from other purple basil varieties by smaller, darker. It has the darkest leaves of any purple basil variety. The plant averages a height of 50 centimetres (20 in) and is grown in sunny or partially sunny environments.
