= Anethole =

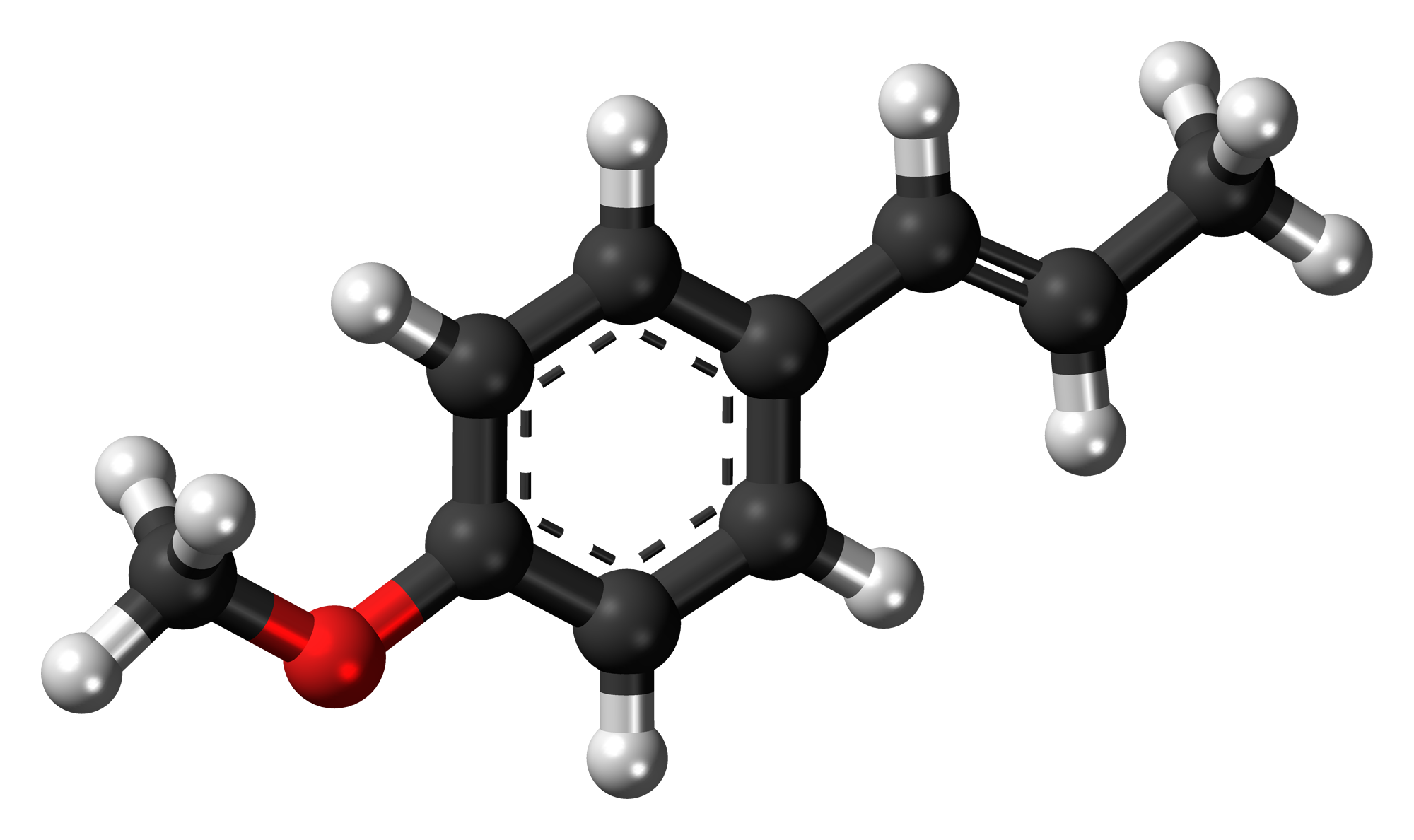

Names
- Preferred IUPAC name 1-Methoxy-4-[(1E)-prop-1-en-1-yl]benzene
- Other names (E)-1-Methoxy-4-(prop-1-en-1-yl)benzene (E)-1-Methoxy-4-(1-propenyl)benzene para-Methoxyphenylpropene p-Propenylanisole; Isoestragole trans-1-Methoxy-4-(prop-1-enyl)benzene

Identifiers
CAS Number	4180-23-8 E isomer; 104-46-1 Unspecified stereochemistry (most commonly used CAS, implicitly E); 25679-28-1 Z isomer
3D model (JSmol)	Interactive image
ChEBI	CHEBI:35616
ChEMBL	ChEMBL452630
ChemSpider	553166
ECHA InfoCard	100.002.914
KEGG	D02377
PubChem CID	637563
UNII	Q3JEK5DO4K
CompTox Dashboard (EPA)	DTXSID4020086
- InChI: InChI=1S/C10H12O/c1-3-4-9-5-7-10(11-2)8-6-9/h3-8H,1-2H3/b4-3+ Key: RUVINXPYWBROJD-ONEGZZNKSA-N; InChI=1/C10H12O/c1-3-4-9-5-7-10(11-2)8-6-9/h3-8H,1-2H3/b4-3+ Key: RUVINXPYWBROJD-ONEGZZNKBR
- SMILES: O(c1ccc(\C=C\C)cc1)C

Properties
Chemical formula	C_{10}H_{12}O
Molar mass	148.205 g/mol
Density	0.998 g/cm^{3}
Melting point	20 to 21 °C (68 to 70 °F; 293 to 294 K)
Boiling point	234 °C (453 °F; 507 K); 81 °C (178 °F; 354 K) at 2 mmHg
Magnetic susceptibility (χ)	−9.60×10^{−5} cm^{3}/mol

Hazards
Safety data sheet (SDS)	External MSDS

Related compounds
Related compounds	anisole estragole
- Except where otherwise noted, data are given for materials in their standard state (at 25 °C [77 °F], 100 kPa). verify (what is ?) Infobox references

Anethole (also known as anise camphor) is an organic compound that is widely used as a flavoring substance. It is a derivative of the aromatic compound allylbenzene and occurs widely in the essential oils of plants. It is in the class of phenylpropanoid organic compounds. It contributes a large component of the odor and flavor of anise and fennel (both in the botanical family Apiaceae), anise myrtle (Myrtaceae), liquorice (Fabaceae), magnolia blossoms, and star anise (Schisandraceae). Closely related to anethole is its isomer estragole, which is abundant in tarragon (Asteraceae) and basil (Lamiaceae), and has a flavor reminiscent of anise. It is a colorless, fragrant, mildly volatile liquid. Anethole is only slightly soluble in water but exhibits high solubility in ethanol. This trait causes certain anise-flavored liqueurs to become cloudy when diluted with water; this is called the ouzo effect.

== Structure and production ==
Anethole is an aromatic, unsaturated ether related to lignols. It exists as both cis–trans isomers (see also E–Z notation), involving the double bond outside the ring. The more abundant isomer, and the one preferred for use, is the trans or E isomer.

In general, anethole is synonymous with trans-anethole, the familiar plant product. However, anethole that is produced synthetically, or has been exposed to UV light, can contain substantial cis-anethole, which is toxic. Its presence in natural anethole is used as a measure of spoilage.

Like related compounds, anethole is poorly soluble in water. Historically, this property was used to detect adulteration in samples.

Most anethole is obtained from turpentine-like extracts from trees. Of only minor commercial significance, anethole can also be isolated from essential oils.

Essential oil	World production	Trans-anethole
Anise	8 tonnes (1999)	95%
Star anise	400 tonnes (1999), mostly from China	87%
Fennel	25 tonnes (1999), mostly from Spain	70%

Currently Banwari Chemicals Pvt Ltd situated in Bhiwadi, Rajasthan, India is the leading manufacturer of anethole. It is prepared commercially from 4-methoxypropiophenone, which is prepared from anisole.

== Uses ==
=== Flavoring ===
Anethole is distinctly sweet, measuring 13 times sweeter than sugar. It is perceived as being pleasant to the taste by many even at higher concentrations. It is used in alcoholic drinks ouzo, rakı, anisette and absinthe, among others. It is also used in seasoning and confectionery applications, such as German Lebkuchen, oral hygiene products, and in small quantities in natural berry flavors.

=== Precursor to other compounds ===
Because they metabolize anethole into several aromatic chemical compounds, some bacteria are candidates for use in commercial bioconversion of anethole to more valuable materials. Bacterial strains capable of using trans-anethole as the sole carbon source include JYR-1 (Pseudomonas putida) and TA13 (Arthrobacter aurescens).

== Research ==
=== Antimicrobial and antifungal activity ===
Anethole has potent antimicrobial properties, against bacteria, yeasts, and fungi. Reported antibacterial properties include both bacteriostatic and bactericidal action against Salmonella enterica but not when used against Salmonella via a fumigation method. Antifungal activity includes increasing the effectiveness of some other phytochemicals (such as polygodial) against Saccharomyces cerevisiae and Candida albicans;

In vitro, anethole has antihelmintic action on eggs and larvae of the sheep gastrointestinal nematode Haemonchus contortus. Anethole also has nematicidal activity against the plant nematode Meloidogyne javanica in vitro and in pots of cucumber seedlings.

=== Insecticidal activity ===
Anethole also is a promising insecticide. Several essential oils consisting mostly of anethole have insecticidal action against larvae of the mosquito Ochlerotatus caspius and Aedes aegypti. In a similar manner, anethole itself is effective against the fungus gnat Lycoriella ingenua (Sciaridae) and the mold mite Tyrophagus putrescentiae. Against the mite, anethole is a slightly more effective pesticide than DEET, but anisaldehyde, a related natural compound that occurs with anethole in many essential oils, is 14 times more effective. The insecticidal action of anethole is greater as a fumigant than as a contact agent. Anethole is highly effective as a fumigant against the cockroach Blattella germanica and against adults of the weevils Sitophilus oryzae, Callosobruchus chinensis and beetle Lasioderma serricorne.

As well as an insect pesticide, anethole is an effective insect repellent against mosquitos.

=== Ouzo effect ===
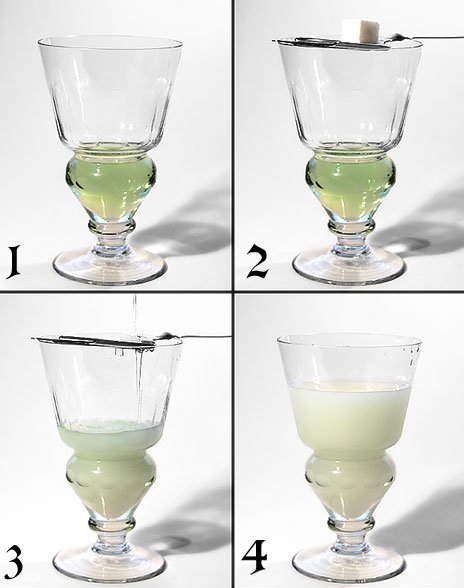
Diluting absinthe with water produces a spontaneous microemulsion (ouzo effect)

Anethole is responsible for the "ouzo effect" (also "louche effect"), the spontaneous formation of a microemulsion that gives many alcoholic beverages containing anethole and water their cloudy appearance. Such a spontaneous microemulsion has many potential commercial applications in the food and pharmaceutical industries.

=== Precursor to illicit drugs ===
Anethole is an inexpensive chemical precursor for paramethoxyamphetamine (PMA), and is used in its clandestine manufacture. Anethole is present in the essential oil from guarana, which has psychoactive effects typically attributed to its caffeine content. The absence of PMA or any other known psychoactive derivative of anethole in human urine after ingestion of guarana leads to the conclusion that any psychoactive effect of guarana is not due to aminated anethole metabolites.

Anethole is also present in absinthe, a liquor with a reputation for psychoactive effects; these effects, however, are attributed to ethanol. (See also thujone, anethole dithione (ADT), and anethole trithione (ATT).)

=== Estrogen and prolactin ===
Anethole has estrogenic activity. It has been found to significantly increase uterine weight in immature female rats.

Fennel, which contains anethole, has been found to have a galactagogue effect in animals. Anethole bears a structural resemblance to catecholamines like dopamine and may displace dopamine from its receptors and thereby disinhibit prolactin secretion, which in turn may be responsible for the galactagogue effects.

== Safety ==
In the USA, anethole is generally recognized as safe (GRAS). After a hiatus due to safety concerns, anethole was reaffirmed by Flavor and Extract Manufacturers Association (FEMA) as GRAS. The concerns related to liver toxicity and possible carcinogenic activity reported in rats. Anethole is associated with a slight increase in liver cancer in rats, although the evidence is scant and generally regarded as evidence that anethole is not a carcinogen. An evaluation of anethole by the Joint FAO/WHO Expert Committee on Food Additives (JECFA) found its notable pharmacologic properties to be reduction in motor activity, lowering of body temperature, and hypnotic, analgesic, and anticonvulsant effects. A subsequent evaluation by JECFA found some reason for concern regarding carcinogenicity, but there is currently insufficient data to support this. At this time, the JECFA summary of these evaluations is that anethole has "no safety concern at current levels of intake when used as a flavoring agent".

In large quantities, anethole is slightly toxic and may act as an irritant.

== History ==
That an oil could be extracted from anise and fennel had been known since the Renaissance by the German alchemist Hieronymus Brunschwig (c. 1450 – c. 1512), the German botanist Adam Lonicer (1528–1586), and the German physician Valerius Cordus (1515–1544), among others. Anethole was first investigated chemically by the Swiss chemist Nicolas-Théodore de Saussure in 1820. In 1832, the French chemist Jean Baptiste Dumas determined that the crystallizable components of anise oil and fennel oil were identical, and he determined anethole's empirical formula. In 1845, the French chemist Charles Gerhardt coined the term anethol – from the Latin anethum (anise) + oleum (oil) – for the fundamental compound from which a family of related compounds was derived. Although the German chemist Emil Erlenmeyer proposed the correct molecular structure for anethole in 1866, it was not until 1872, that the structure was accepted as correct.

== See also ==
- Category:Anise liqueurs and spirits
- List of liqueurs § Anise-flavored liqueurs
- Anol
- Chavicol
- Dianethole
- Fenchone
- Pseudoisoeugenol
- PiHKAL § Essential amphetamines
- Safrole
