= Isobutyramide =

Names
- Preferred IUPAC name 2-Methylpropanamide

Identifiers
CAS Number	563-83-7
3D model (JSmol)	Interactive image
ChEMBL	ChEMBL352219
ChemSpider	61707
ECHA InfoCard	100.008.424
PubChem CID	68424
UNII	82UOE7B38Z
CompTox Dashboard (EPA)	DTXSID1060340
- InChI: InChI=1S/C4H9NO/c1-3(2)4(5)6/h3H,1-2H3,(H2,5,6)
- SMILES: O=C(N)C(C)C

Properties
Chemical formula	C_{4}H_{9}NO
Molar mass	87.122 g·mol^{−1}
- Except where otherwise noted, data are given for materials in their standard state (at 25 °C [77 °F], 100 kPa). verify (what is ?) Infobox references

Isobutyramide in chemistry is an amide with the molecular formula C_{4}H_{9}NO.

Isobutyramide can also refer to the functional group with the following chemical formula: R-NH-CO-CH(CH_{3})_{2}.

Isobutyramide functional group

== See also ==
- Butyramide
