= Chavicol =

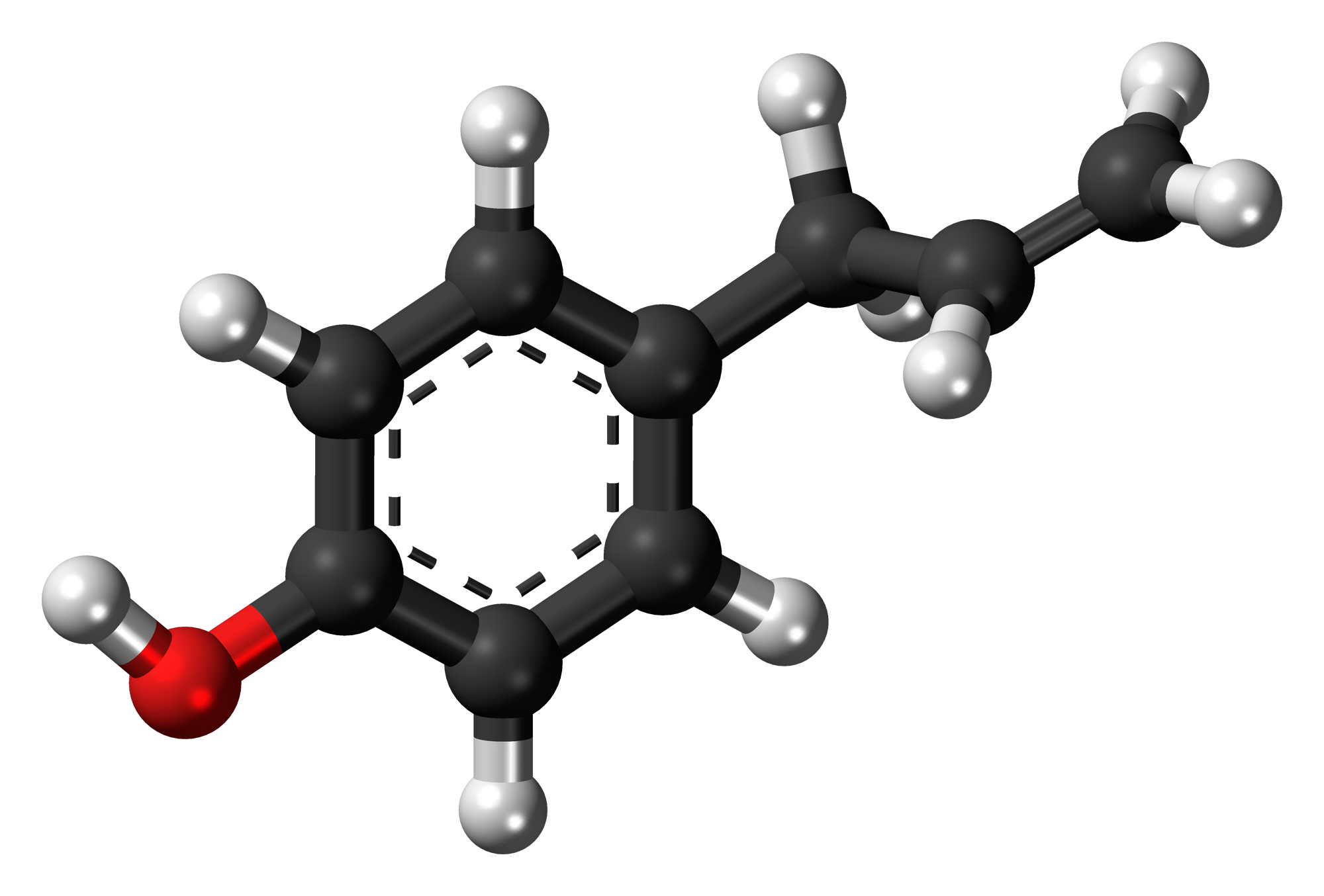

Names
- Preferred IUPAC name 4-(Prop-2-en-1-yl)phenol
- Other names 4-Allylphenol; p-Allylphenol; para-Allylphenol

Identifiers
CAS Number	501-92-8
3D model (JSmol)	Interactive image
ChEBI	CHEBI:50158
ChEMBL	ChEMBL108862
ChemSpider	21105856
ECHA InfoCard	100.007.209
EC Number	207-929-2
KEGG	C16930
PubChem CID	68148
UNII	Q5ER4K6969
CompTox Dashboard (EPA)	DTXSID60198210
- InChI: InChI=1S/C9H10O/c1-2-3-8-4-6-9(10)7-5-8/h2,4-7,10H,1,3H2 Key: RGIBXDHONMXTLI-UHFFFAOYSA-N; InChI=1/C9H10O/c1-2-3-8-4-6-9(10)7-5-8/h2,4-7,10H,1,3H2 Key: RGIBXDHONMXTLI-UHFFFAOYAI
- SMILES: C=CCC1=CC=C(C=C1)O

Properties
Chemical formula	C_{9}H_{10}O
Molar mass	134.18 g/mol
Density	1.020 g/cm^{3}
Melting point	16 °C (61 °F; 289 K)
Boiling point	238 °C (460 °F; 511 K) (123 °C at 16 mmHg)
Solubility in water	2.46 g/L
- Except where otherwise noted, data are given for materials in their standard state (at 25 °C [77 °F], 100 kPa). verify (what is ?) Infobox references

Chavicol (p-allylphenol) is a natural phenylpropene, a type of organic compound. Its chemical structure consists of a benzene ring substituted with a hydroxy group and a propenyl group. It is a colorless liquid found together with terpenes in betel oil.

== Properties and reactions ==
Chavicol is miscible with alcohol, ether, and chloroform. Dimerization of chavicol gives the neo-lignan magnolol.

== Uses ==
Chavicol is used as an odorant in perfumery and as a flavor. It has a phenolic, medicinal, and herbal aroma. It is found in many essential oils, including anise and gardenia.

== Biosynthesis ==
Chavicol is formed in sweet basil (Ocimum Basilicum) by the phenylpropanoid pathway via p-coumaryl alcohol. The allylic alcohol in p-coumaryl alcohol is converted into a leaving group. This then leaves thus forming a cation, this cation can be regarded as a quinone methide which then is reduced by NADPH to form either anol or chavicol.

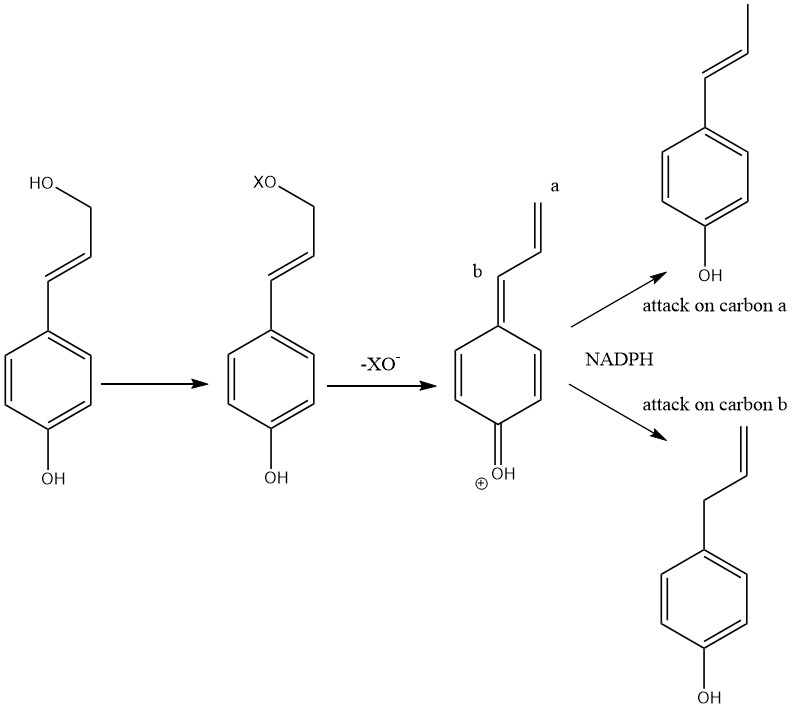
Biosynthesis of para anol and para chavicol

== See also ==
- Estragole, the methyl ether
- Safrole, a methylenedioxy analog
