= Anol =

Pair of stereoisomers

Clinical data
- ATC code: None

Identifiers
- IUPAC name: 4-(Prop-1-en-1-yl)phenol
- CAS Number: 85960-81-2
- PubChem CID: 415627
- ChemSpider: 367976
- UNII: VQ6PDW0YG3
- CompTox Dashboard (EPA): DTXSID401345962

Chemical and physical data
- Formula: C_{9}H_{10}O
- Molar mass: 134.178 g·mol^{−1}
- 3D model (JSmol): Interactive image
- SMILES: CC=CC1=CC=C(C=C1)O
- InChI: InChI=1S/C9H10O/c1-2-3-8-4-6-9(10)7-5-8/h2-7,10H,1H3; Key:UMFCIIBZHQXRCJ-UHFFFAOYSA-N

Anol, also known as p-hydroxypropenylbenzene, is a simple phenol that was derived via demethylation from anethole, an estrogenic constituent of anise and fennel, by Sir Charles Dodds in 1937. It was reported to possess extremely potent estrogenic activity on par with that of steroidal estrogens like estrone, with a dose of 1 μg inducing estrus in rats. However, subsequent studies with different preparations of anol failed to confirm these findings, and it was found that dimerization of anol into dianol and hexestrol can rapidly occur and that the latter impurity was responsible for the highly potent estrogenic effects. Dodds later synthesized the structurally related and extremely potent estrogen diethylstilbestrol in 1938.

== See also ==
- Dianethole
