= Estragole =

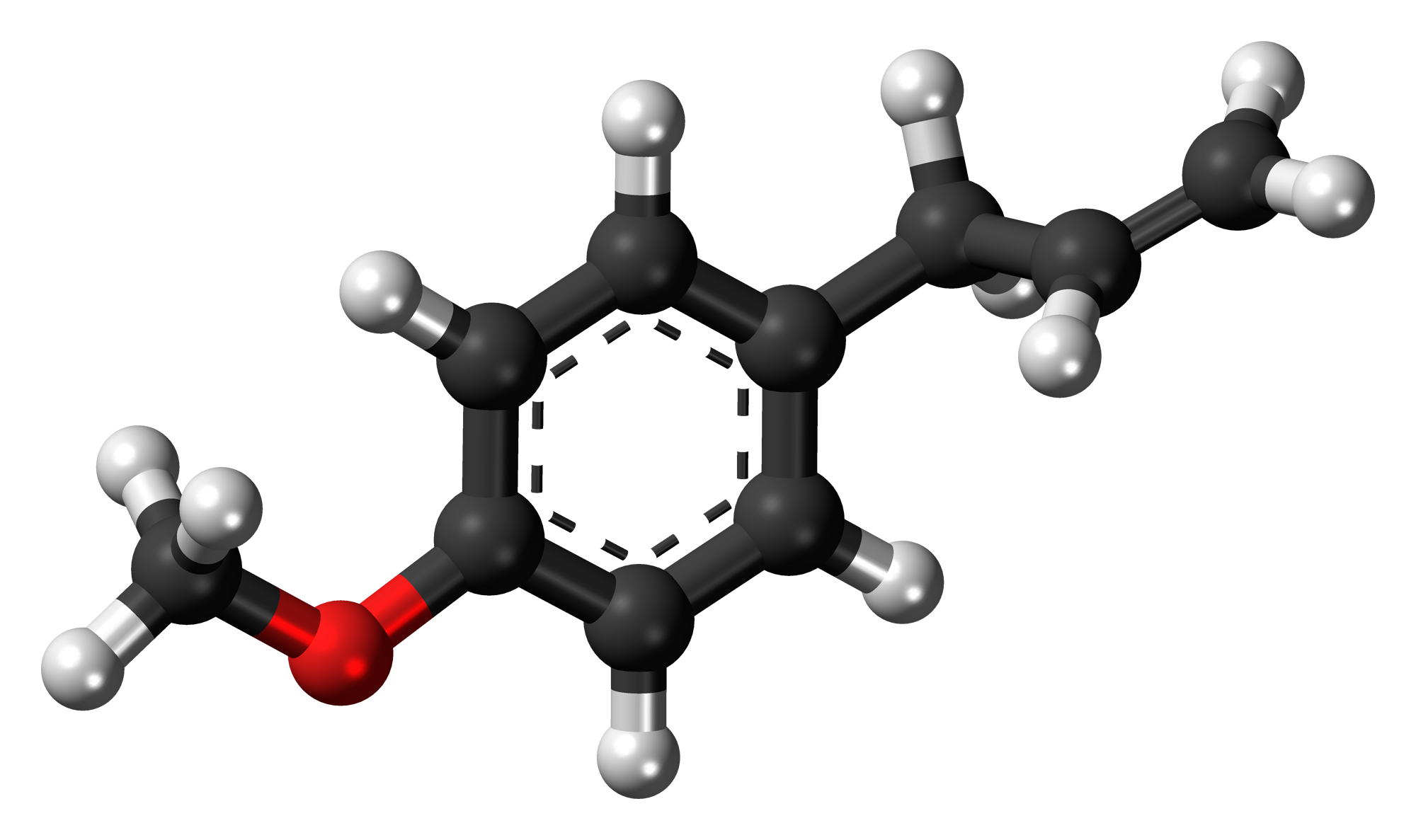

Names
- Preferred IUPAC name 1-Methoxy-4-(prop-2-en-1-yl)benzene
- Other names 1-Methoxy-4-(2-propenyl)-benzene; 1-Allyl-4-methoxybenzene; Estragol; Estragon p-Allylanisole; Chavicyl methylether Methylchavicol; Chavicol methylether Isoanethole; 4-Allylanisole

Identifiers
CAS Number	140-67-0
3D model (JSmol)	Interactive image
ChEBI	CHEBI:4867
ChEMBL	ChEMBL470671
ChemSpider	13850247
ECHA InfoCard	100.004.935
EC Number	205-427-8
KEGG	C10452
PubChem CID	8815
UNII	9NIW07V3ET
CompTox Dashboard (EPA)	DTXSID0020575
- InChI: InChI=1S/C10H12O/c1-3-4-9-5-7-10(11-2)8-6-9/h3,5-8H,1,4H2,2H3 Key: ZFMSMUAANRJZFM-UHFFFAOYSA-N; InChI=1/C10H12O/c1-3-4-9-5-7-10(11-2)8-6-9/h3,5-8H,1,4H2,2H3 Key: ZFMSMUAANRJZFM-UHFFFAOYAS
- SMILES: COc1ccc(CC=C)cc1

Properties
Chemical formula	C_{10}H_{12}O
Molar mass	148.20 g/mol
Density	0.946 g/cm^{3}
Boiling point	216 °C (421 °F; 489 K); 95–96 °C (203–205 °F; 368–369 K) at 12 mmHg
Solubility in water	insoluble
Vapor pressure	0.05 mmHg

Hazards
- GHS labelling
Pictograms	(GHS07: Exclamation mark) (GHS08: Health hazard)
Signal word	Warning
Hazard statements	H302, H315, H317, H341, H351, H412
Precautionary statements	P203, P261, P264, P270, P272, P273, P280, P301+P317, P302+P352, P318, P321, P330, P333+P317, P362+P364, P405, P501
Flash point	81 °C (178 °F; 354 K)
- Lethal dose or concentration (LD, LC)
LD_{50} (median dose)	1030 mg/kg (rat, ip)
- Except where otherwise noted, data are given for materials in their standard state (at 25 °C [77 °F], 100 kPa). verify (what is ?) Infobox references

Estragole (p-allylanisole, methyl chavicol) is a phenylpropene, a natural organic compound. Its chemical structure consists of a benzene ring substituted with a methoxy group and an allyl group. It is an isomer of anethole, differing with respect to the location of the double bond. It is a colorless liquid, although impure samples can appear yellow. It is a component of various trees and plants, including turpentine (pine oil), anise, fennel, bay, tarragon, and basil. It is used in the preparation of fragrances. Its aroma is described as "sweet, sassafras, anise, spicy, green, herbal, fennel, phenolic, minty".

The compound is named for estragon, the French name of tarragon.

== Production ==
Hundreds of tonnes of basil oil are produced annually by steam distillation of Ocimum basilicum (common basil). This oil is mainly estragole but also contains substantial amounts of linalool. Estragole is the primary constituent of essential oil of tarragon (comprising 60–75%). It is also present in pine oil, turpentine, fennel, anise (2%), frankincense (4%), Clausena anisata, and Syzygium anisatum.

Estragole is used in perfumes and in flavorings for foods. In the European Union, it can only be present in a flavor by using an essential oil. Upon treatment with potassium hydroxide, estragole converts to anethole.

== Derivatives ==
- Estragole is used in the synthesis of magnolol (through chavicol).
- Another use of estragole is in the patented synthesis of Toscanol™ [16510-27-3] (Givaudan).

== Safety ==
Estragole is suspected to be carcinogenic and genotoxic, as is indicated by a report of the European Union Committee on Herbal Medicinal Products. Several studies have clearly established that the profiles of metabolism, metabolic activation, and covalent binding are dose dependent and that the relative importance diminishes markedly at low levels of exposure (that is, these events are not linear with respect to dose). In particular, rodent studies show that these events are minimal probably in the dose range of 1–10 mg/kg body weight, which is approximately 100 to 1,000 times the anticipated human exposure to this substance. For these reasons it is concluded that the present exposure to estragole resulting from consumption of herbal medicinal products (short time use in adults at recommended posology) does not pose a significant cancer risk. In the meantime exposure of estragole to sensitive groups such as young children, pregnant and breastfeeding women should be minimized.

The Scientific Committee on Food from the Health and Consumer Protection Directorate of the European Commission took a more concerned position and concluded that "Estragole has been demonstrated to be genotoxic and carcinogenic. Therefore the existence of a threshold cannot be assumed and the Committee could not establish a safe exposure limit. Consequently, reductions in exposure and restrictions in use levels are indicated."

== See also ==
- Anethole, an isomer
- Chavicol, the phenol analog
- Safrole, a methylenedioxy analog
- PiHKAL § Essential amphetamines
