= Purple giant hyssop =

Purple giant hyssop is a common name for several plants and may refer to:

- Agastache rugosa, native to eastern Asia
- Agastache scrophulariifolia, native to North America
