= Wild hyssop =

Wild hyssop may refer to:

- Agastache cana, a plant in the family Lamiaceae native to New Mexico and Texas
- Hyssopus, a genus of plants in the family Lamiaceae native to Europe
- Verbena officinalis, a plant in the family Verbenaceae native to Europe and naturalized in North America
