= C10H10O2 =

The molecular formula C_{10}H_{10}O_{2} (molar mass : 162.18 g/mol) may refer to:

- Benzoylacetone
- Isosafrole, 3,4-methylenedioxyphenyl-1-propene
- 4-Methoxycinnamaldehyde
- Methyl cinnamate
- Safrole, 3,4-methylenedioxyphenyl-2-propene
- 4,5-Dihydro-1-benzoxepin-3(2H)-one, a watermelon flavorant
