= Agastache parvifolia =

Conservation status
- Apparently Secure (NatureServe)

Scientific classification
- Kingdom: Plantae
- Clade: Tracheophytes
- Clade: Angiosperms
- Clade: Eudicots
- Clade: Asterids
- Order: Lamiales
- Family: Lamiaceae
- Genus: Agastache
- Species: A. parvifolia

Binomial name
- Agastache parvifolia Eastw.

Species of flowering plant

Agastache parvifolia is a species of flowering plant in the mint family known by the common name small-leaf giant hyssop. It is endemic to far northern California, where it grows in woodlands. It is an uncommon species and is sometimes considered a local subspecies of Agastache urticifolia.

== Description ==
This plant is an aromatic perennial herb producing an erect stem with triangular serrated leaves on petioles. This species is characterized by leaves under 5 centimeters long and 3.5 wide. The inflorescence is a spike occupying the top of the stem. The flowers have pink-tipped green sepals and tubular pink corollas.
