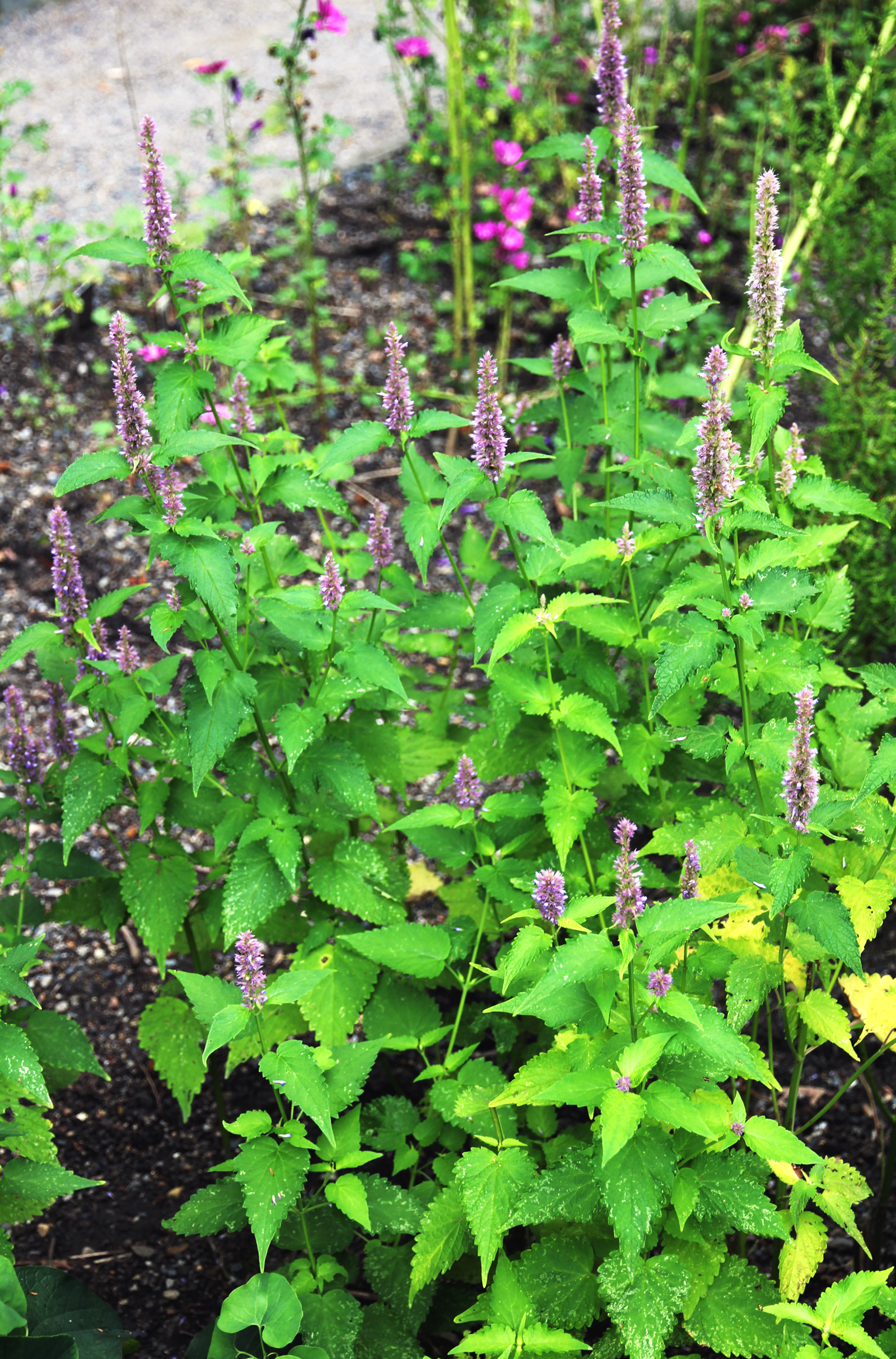
- Agastache mexicana in Prague Botanical garden

Scientific classification
- Kingdom: Plantae
- Clade: Tracheophytes
- Clade: Angiosperms
- Clade: Eudicots
- Clade: Asterids
- Order: Lamiales
- Family: Lamiaceae
- Genus: Agastache
- Species: A. mexicana

Binomial name
- Agastache mexicana (Kunth) Lint & Epling

= Agastache mexicana =

Species of flowering plant

Agastache mexicana is a species of flowering plant in the mint family known by the common name Mexican giant hyssop. It is native to southern North America and can grow up to 100 cm tall. The leaves are lanceolate or oval-lanceolate. The plant is perennial and self-fertile. Its young lemon scented leaves are used in herbal teas and the leaves are also often used in flavoring foods.

== Climate ==
This plant can thrive in arid or semi-arid regions, but it is necessary for the seed to pass a cold and humid season which break dormancy in order to produce germination.

== Environment ==
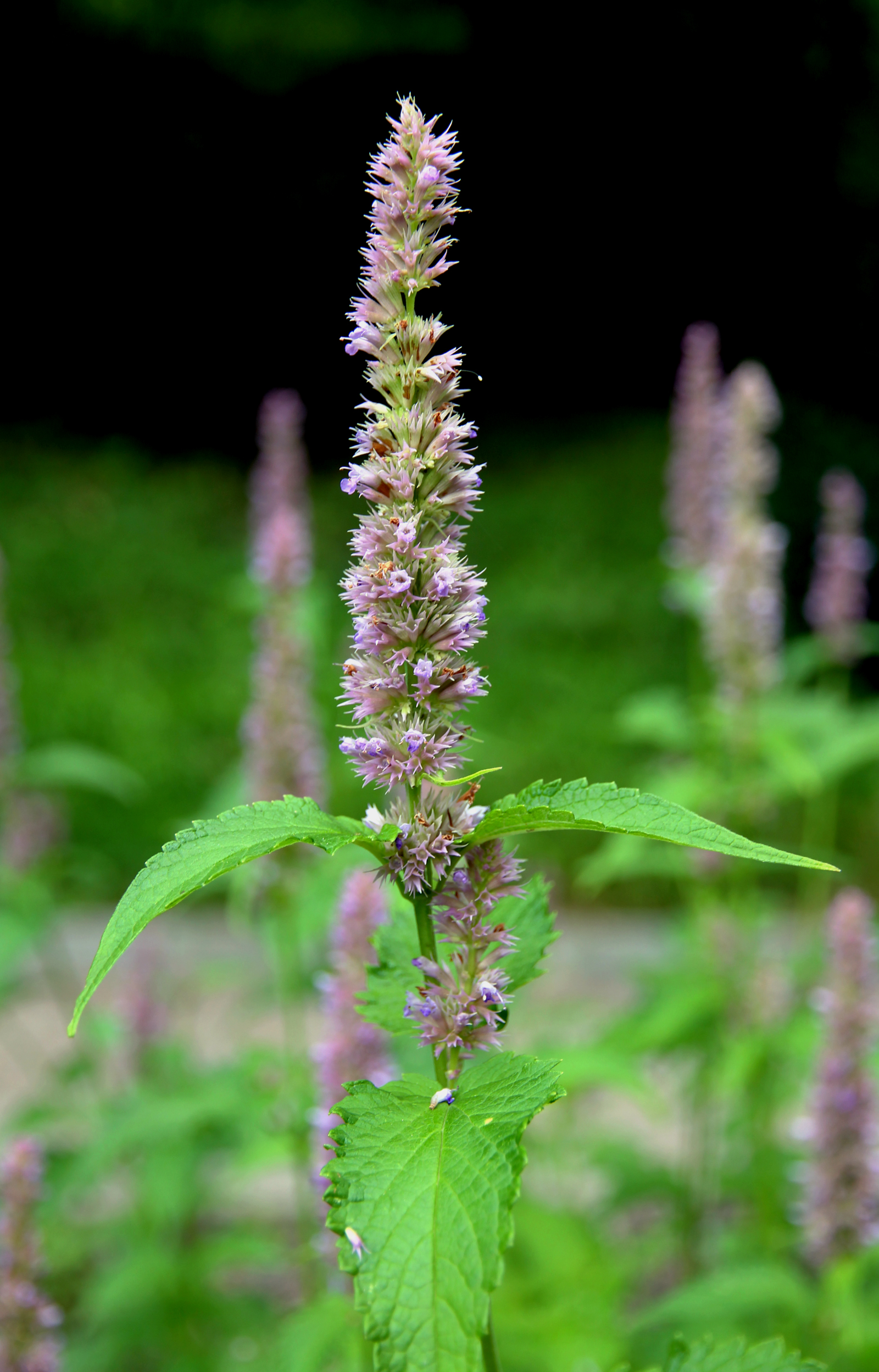
Detail of flower

For a proper development it requires alkaline or neutral, aerated and light soil, otherwise the excessive humidity, compactness and damping will putrify the root system.

This species requires direct sunlight or partial shade, but doesn't do well in interior corners or under taller plants; these situations will make the plant tend to yellowing and loss of leaves, absence of flowering and even death.

Sunny days and cooler nights will produce more intense aroma in the leaves. It can produce flowers when it reaches 1 month old, but requires at least 3 days of natural or artificial watering for two weeks.

== Uses ==
Infusion of Agastache mexicana areal parts has been used for jaundice therapy in the Mexican ethnomedicine.

There is no evidence that the plant repels mosquitos despite the common name "mosquito plant".
