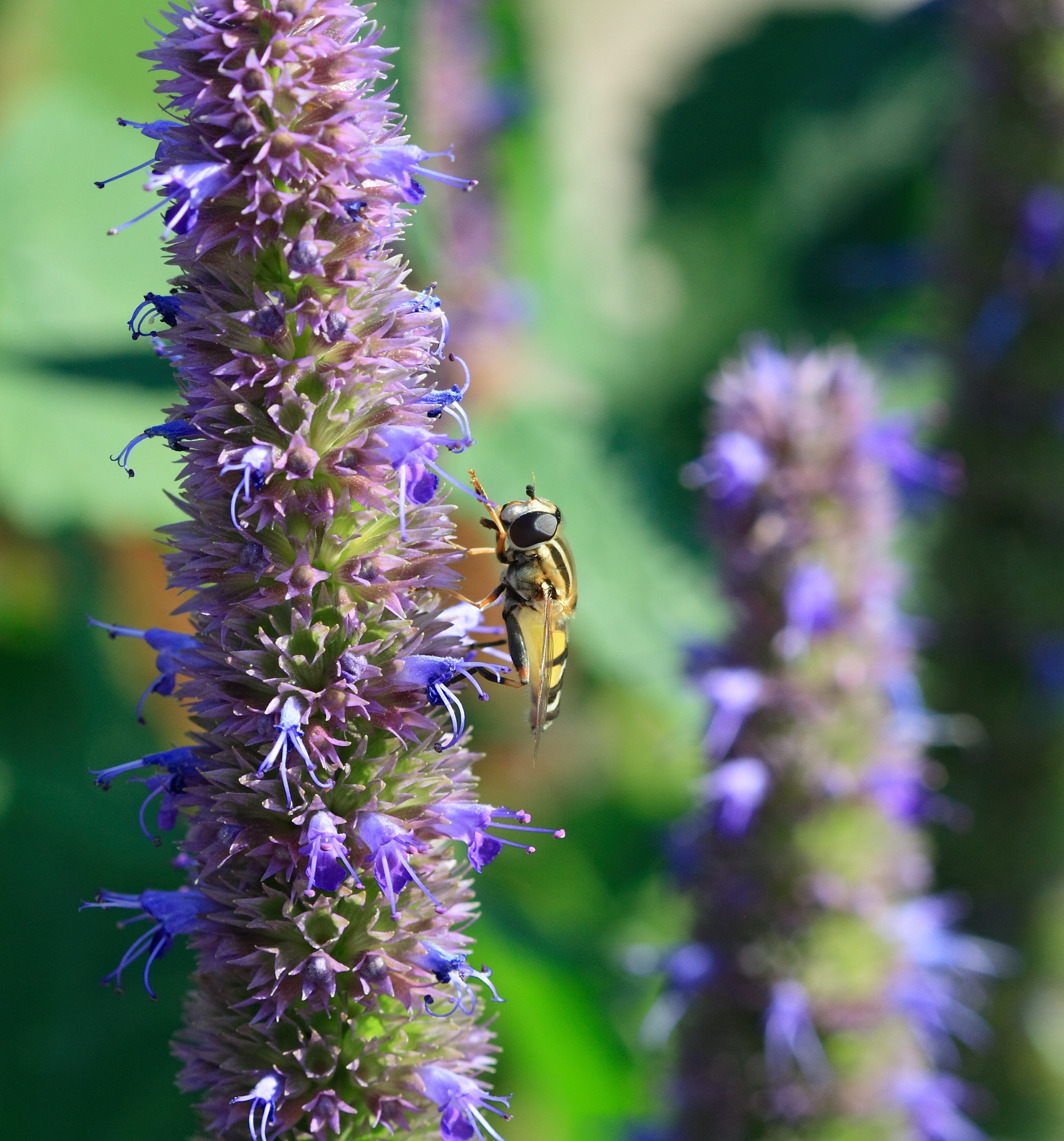
- Agastache hybrid 'Blue Fortune'

Scientific classification
- Kingdom: Plantae
- Clade: Tracheophytes
- Clade: Angiosperms
- Clade: Eudicots
- Clade: Asterids
- Order: Lamiales
- Family: Lamiaceae
- Subfamily: Nepetoideae
- Tribe: Mentheae
- Genus: Agastache; Gronov.

Diversity
- 22 species

Synonyms
- Brittonastrum Briq. Flessera Adans. Dekinia M.Martens & Galeotti; Lophanthus Benth. non Adans.: preoccupied

= Agastache =

Genus of flowering plants

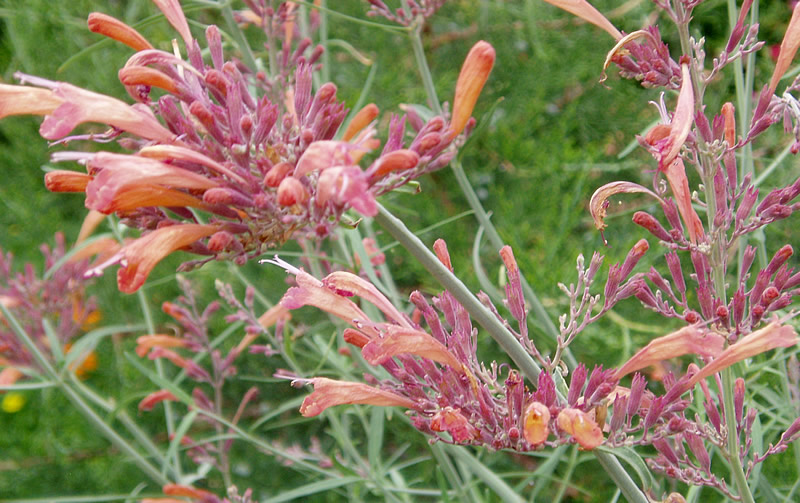
Agastache rupestris in bloom.

Agastache (/ˌæɡəˈstɑːkiː/) is a genus of aromatic flowering herbaceous perennial plants in the family Lamiaceae. It contains 22 species, mainly native to North America, one species native to eastern Asia. The common names of the species are a variety of fairly ambiguous and confusing "hyssops" and "mints"; as a whole the genus is known as giant hyssops or hummingbird mints.

== Description ==
Most species are very upright, 0.5–3 metres (1 1/2–10 ft) tall, with stiff, angular stems clothed in toothed-edged, lance-shaped leaves ranging from 1–15 centimetres (1/2–6 in) long and 0.5–11 cm broad depending on the species. Upright spikes of tubular, two-lipped flowers develop at the stem tips in summer. The flowers are usually white, pink, mauve, or purple, with the bracts that back the flowers being of the same or a slightly contrasting color.

== Taxonomy ==
Agastache derives from the Ancient Greek words ἄγαν (ágan) "very much" and στάχυς (stákhus) "ear of grain", describing the flower spikes. The genus was established in 1762 by Jan Frederik Gronovius in the second edition of his controversial Flora Virginica, based on the specimens and notes of John Clayton. It is a member of subfamily Nepetoideae, which contains a large proportion of the world's aromatic culinary herbs. Within its subfamily, it belongs to the mint tribe (Mentheae), and therein to the catmint subtribe (Nepetinae). The Nepetinae are robustly supported by cladistic analyses of morphological and DNA sequence data, and were recognized as early as the mid-late 19th century.

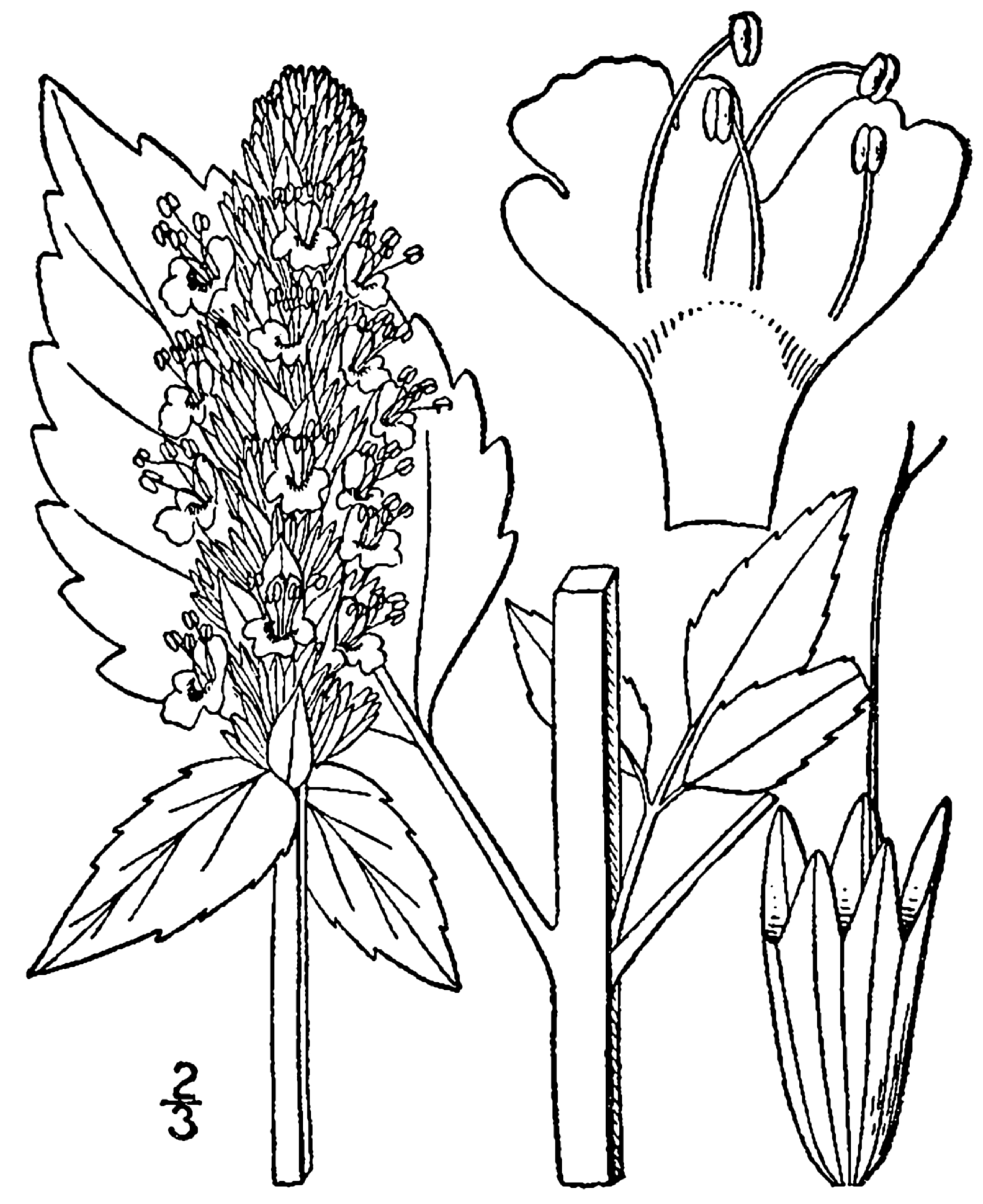
Agastache nepetoides anatomy, demonstrating the curving stamen stalks typical of Agastache sect. Agastache

The closest living relatives of Agastache are believed to be two very different lineages: One is a group of mostly Asian and usually strongly aromatic and rather robust plants, which contains the typical dragonheads (Dracocephalum), true hyssops (Hyssopus), West Asian dragonheads (Lallemantia), and Japanese catnip (Schizonepeta). By contrast, the other lineage unites the largely scentless and low-growing genera Glechoma and Meehania which occur widely across the Holarctic. These three lineages form a tight-knit radiation; as of 2016, it is not resolved with certainty which of the other two lineages is the sister taxon of Agastache, but most data place the aromatic group slightly closer. The genus Agastache seems to have originated as a North American/trans-Beringian offshoot of its radiation about 25 million years ago, in the Late Oligocene.

The sister group of this clade is the core of the Nepetinae, the more or less robust and typically aromatic catmints (Nepeta) and their close relatives which occur mainly in and around western Asia. The monotypic and highly distinct Cedronella (Canary balm) of Macaronesia is slightly more distant and seems to be a basal relict within the subtribe. Thus, the last common ancestor of Agastache and its closest relatives probably was an aromatic Eastern Asian perennial or subshrub with verticillasters of bluish-purple flowers – i.e. generally very similar to the present-day Agastache already. The plesiomorphic appearance of Agastache is underscored by the fact that some of its species were formerly placed in Lophanthus and even Cedronella; essentially, the genus as recognized today was distributed piecemeal across the entire Nepetinae. In general, the evolutionary pattern of the subtribe is a mostly eastward expansion from an origin in the southern or the eastern Mediterranean region, which spread across much of the Old World and with three genera reached North America.

Agastache is divided into two sections, sect. Agastache and sect. Brittonastrum. The former occurs in and around western to central North America, extending across the Bering Strait into East Asia. It is characterized by the upper lip of the corolla being small, causing the stalks of the stamina to protrude widely. Furthermore, two of the four stamina have curving stalks, which cross those of the other pair. Section Brittonastrum is found in and around southwestern North America, with the highest diversity in the uplands of northern Mexico. Its members have a more well-developed upper corolla lip, under which the stamina run parallel to each other without crossing, and are entirely hidden from view or only protrude with the anthers and stalk tips.

=== Species ===
The sections with their species are:

Agastache sect. Agastache – typical giant hyssops

- Agastache cusickii (Greenm.) A.Heller – Cusick's giant hyssop. NW USA (Idaho, Oregon, Montana, Nevada)
- Agastache foeniculum (Pursh) Kuntze (= A. anethiodora, A. anisata) – lavender giant hyssop, anise hyssop, etc. Widespread from Arctic Canada to Colorado and Kentucky; naturalized in Austria
- Agastache nepetoides (L.) Kuntze – yellow giant hyssop. Eastern North America from southern Ontario and southern Quebec south to Oklahoma and Georgia
- Agastache occidentalis (Piper) A.Heller – western giant hyssop. Washington, Oregon
- Agastache parvifolia Eastw. – small-leaf giant hyssop. Northern California
- Agastache rugosa (Fisch. & C.A.Mey.) Kuntze – wrinkled giant hyssop, Korean mint, etc. Southeastern Russia (Primoriye, Khabarovsk), Japan, China, Korea, Taiwan; naturalized in Laos and Vietnam
- Agastache scrophulariifolia (Willd.) Kuntze – purple giant hyssop. Eastern North America from southern Ontario and South Dakora south to Georgia
- Agastache urticifolia (Benth.) Kuntze – nettle-leaf giant hyssop, horsemint; Western North America from British Columbia south to California and Colorado

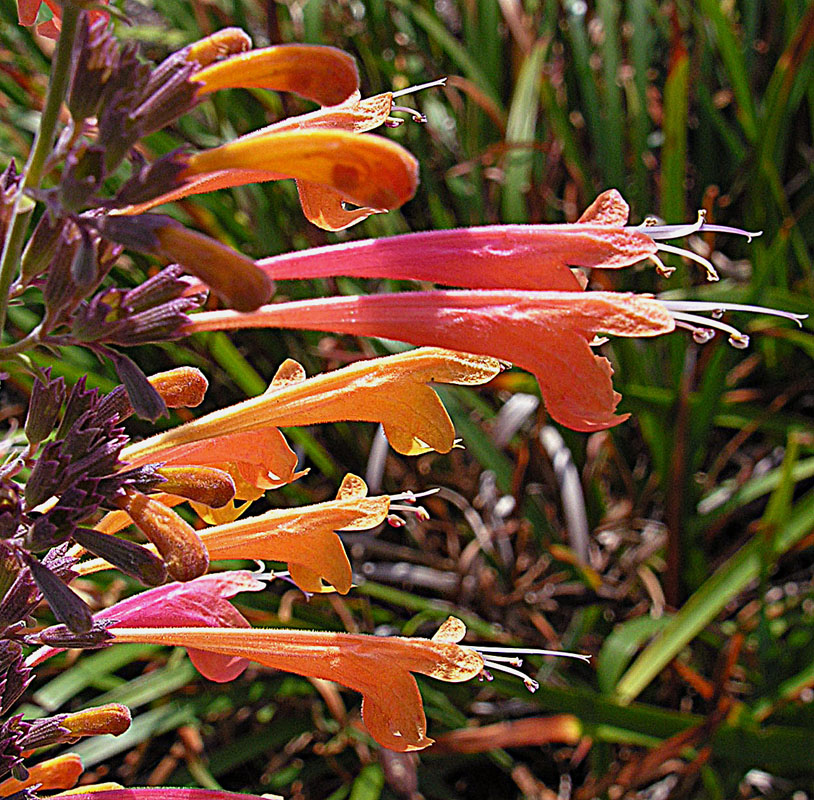
Agastache aurantiaca flowers; the stamina are hidden within the corolla for most of their length.

Agastache sect. Brittonastrum – hummingbird mints

- Agastache aurantiaca (A.Gray) Lint & Epling – orange hummingbird mint. Mexico (Chihuahua, Durango)
- Agastache breviflora (A.Gray) Epling – Trans-Pecos giant hyssop. Northern Mexico (Chihuahua, Sonora), SW USA (Arizona, New Mexico, Texas)
- Agastache cana (Hook.) Wooton & Standl. – Texas hummingbird mint, mosquito plant, etc. SW USA (New Mexico, Western Texas)
- Agastache coccinea (Greene) Lint & Epling – red hummingbird mint. Mexico (Chihuahua, Durango)
- Agastache eplingiana R.W.Sanders – Epling's giant hyssop. Mexico (Durango)
- Agastache mearnsii Wooton & Standl. – San Luis Mountain giant hyssop. New Mexico, Chihuahua, Sonora
- Agastache mexicana (Kunth) Lint & Epling – Mexican giant hyssop. Widespread across much of Mexico
- Agastache micrantha (A.Gray) Wooton & Standl. – white giant hyssop. Arizona, New Mexico, Texas, Chihuahua
- Agastache pallida (Lindl.) Cory (= A. barberi) - pale giant hyssop, giant hummingbird mint. Northern Mexico (Chihuahua, Durango, Sonora), southwestern USA (Arizona)
- Agastache pallidiflora (A.Heller) Rydb. – New Mexico giant hyssop, Bill Williams Mountain giant hyssop. Northern Mexico (Chihuahua), Southwestern USA (Arizona, Colorado, New Mexico, western Texas)
- Agastache palmeri (B.L.Rob.) Standl. – Palmer's giant hyssop. Central + northeastern Mexico
- Agastache pringlei (Briq.) Lint & Epling – Pringle's giant hyssop, Organ Mountains giant hyssop. Northern Mexico (Chihuahua), southwestern USA (New Mexico)
- Agastache rupestris (Greene) Standl. – threadleaf giant hyssop, licorice mint. Arizona, New Mexico
- Agastache wrightii (Greenm.) Wooton & Standl. – Sonoran giant hyssop. Arizona, New Mexico, Chihuahua, Sonora

== Ecology ==
They grow easily in moist, well-drained soil and prefer a sunny position. Winter hardiness varies; the hardiest is A. foeniculum, hardy to USDA plant hardiness zone 1 in the north of its range; A. nepetoides, A. rugosa, A. scrophulariifolia and A. urticifolia are hardy to zones 3–5 in the northern parts of their ranges.

== Cultivation and uses ==
Propagate from seed or cuttings. Popular cultivars include A. cana 'Heather Queen'. The cultivar 'Blue Fortune' has gained the Royal Horticultural Society's Award of Garden Merit.

Leaf tips can be eaten and made into teas. Agastache rugosa has a history of use in Chinese herbology, where it is called huoxiang (Chinese: 藿香; pinyin: huòxiāng).
