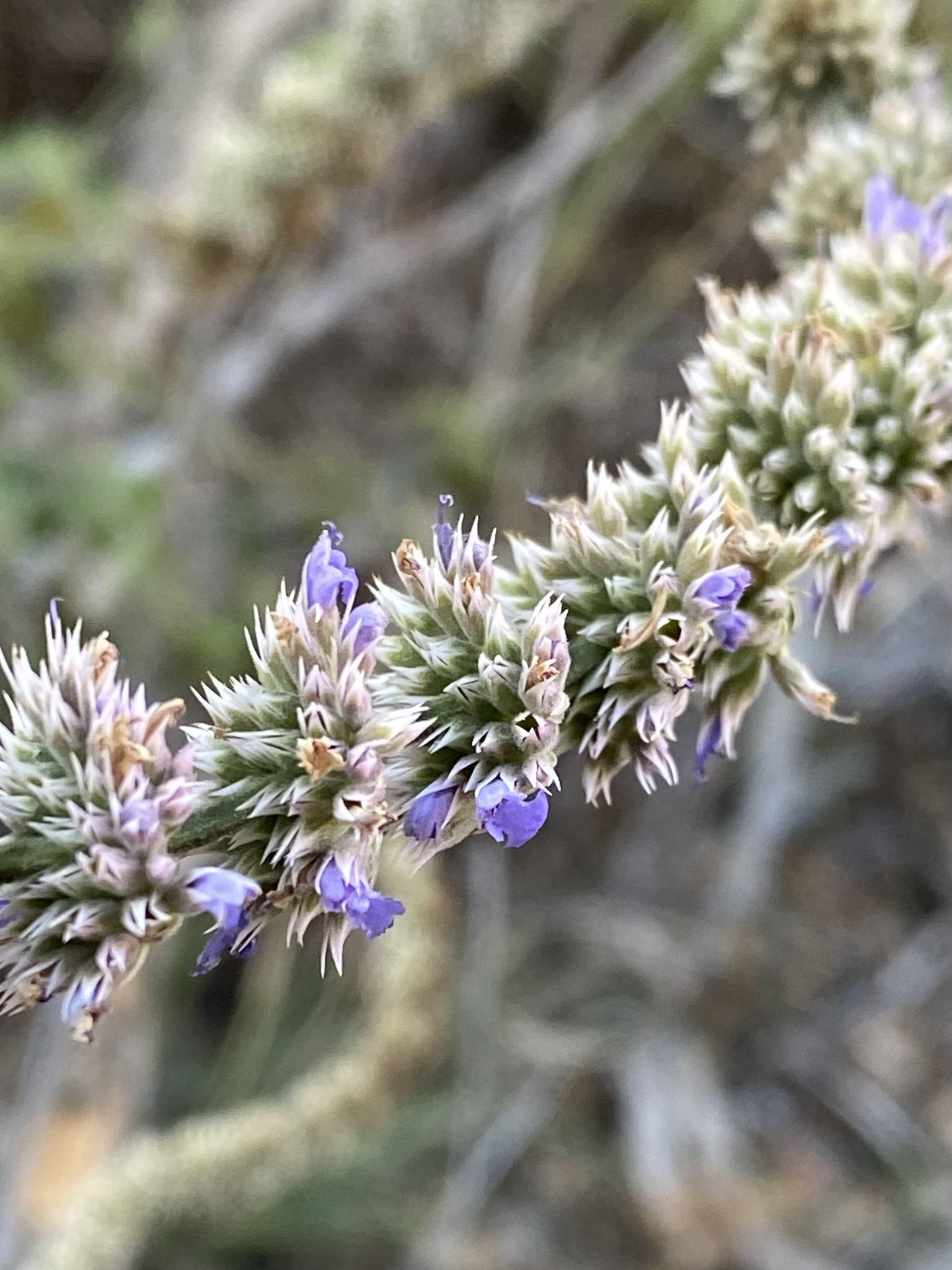

Scientific classification
- Kingdom: Plantae
- Clade: Tracheophytes
- Clade: Angiosperms
- Clade: Eudicots
- Clade: Asterids
- Order: Lamiales
- Family: Lamiaceae
- Genus: Agastache
- Species: A. wrightii

Binomial name
- Agastache wrightii (Greenm.) Woot. & Standl.

Synonyms
- Brittonastrum wrightii (Greenm.) B.L. Rob.; Cedronella wrightii Greenm.

= Agastache wrightii =

Species of flowering plant

Agastache wrightii is a plant species in the genus Agastache, family Lamiaceae. It is native to the US states of Arizona and New Mexico, as well as the Sierra Madre Occidental along the boundary between the Mexican states of Chihuahua and Sonora. Its common name is Sonoran giant hyssop.

It is a herb up to 2m tall with blue flowers.
