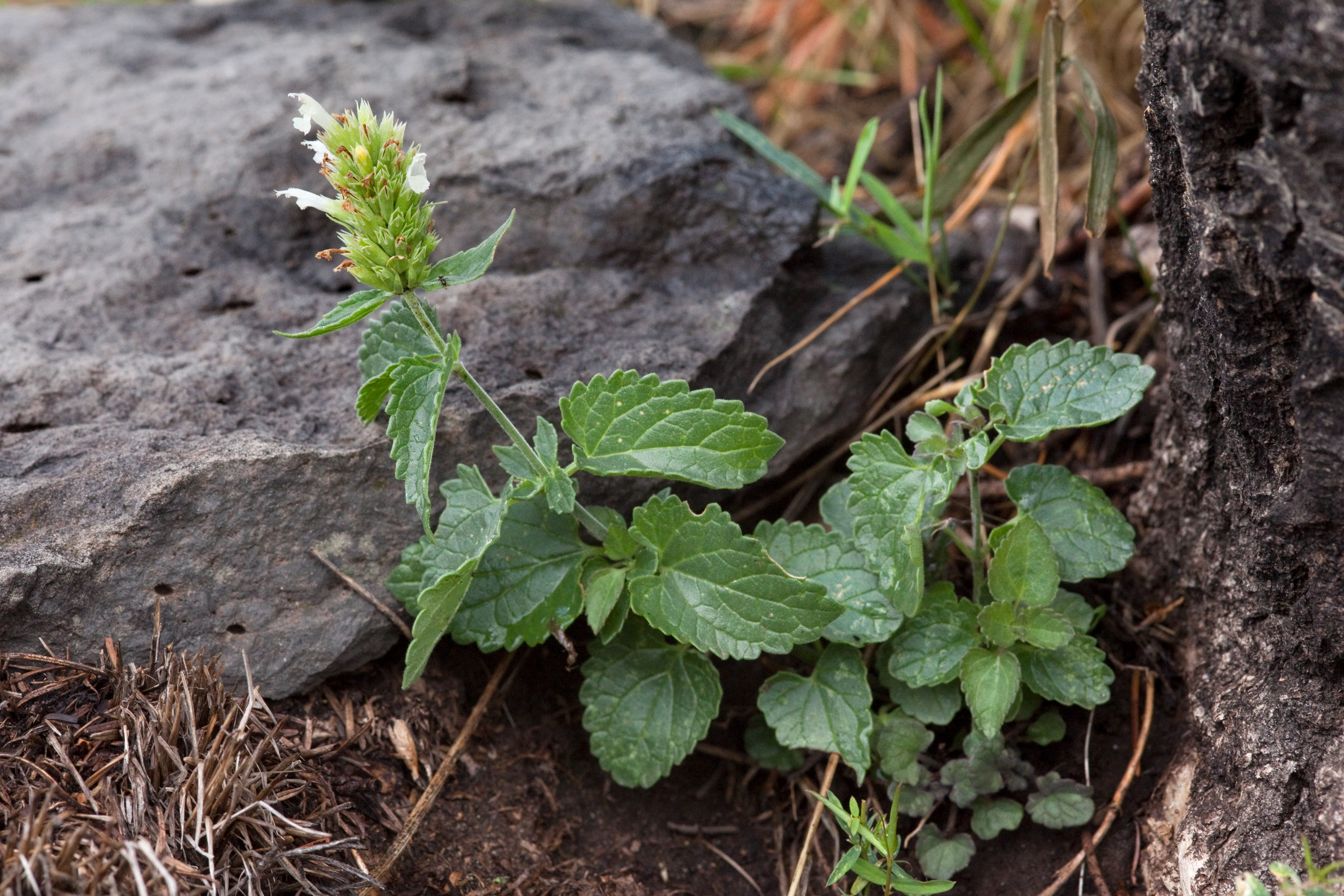

Conservation status
- Apparently Secure (NatureServe)

Scientific classification
- Kingdom: Plantae
- Clade: Tracheophytes
- Clade: Angiosperms
- Clade: Eudicots
- Clade: Asterids
- Order: Lamiales
- Family: Lamiaceae
- Genus: Agastache
- Species: A. pallidiflora

Binomial name
- Agastache pallidiflora (A.Heller) Rydb., 1906

Subspecies and varieties
- A. pallidiflora var. gilensis R.W.Sanders; A. pallidiflora var. greenei (Briq.) R.W.Sanders; A. pallidiflora var. harvardii (A.Gray) R.W.Sanders; A. pallidiflora subsp. neomexicana (Briq.) Lint & Epling; A. pallidiflora subsp. pallidiflora

Synonyms
- List: Brittonastrum pallidiflorum A.Heller (1899)

= Agastache pallidiflora =

Plant species in the mint family

Agastache pallidiflora, commonly known as New Mexico giant hyssop or Bill Williams Mountain giant hyssop, is a plant in the mint family.

== Description ==
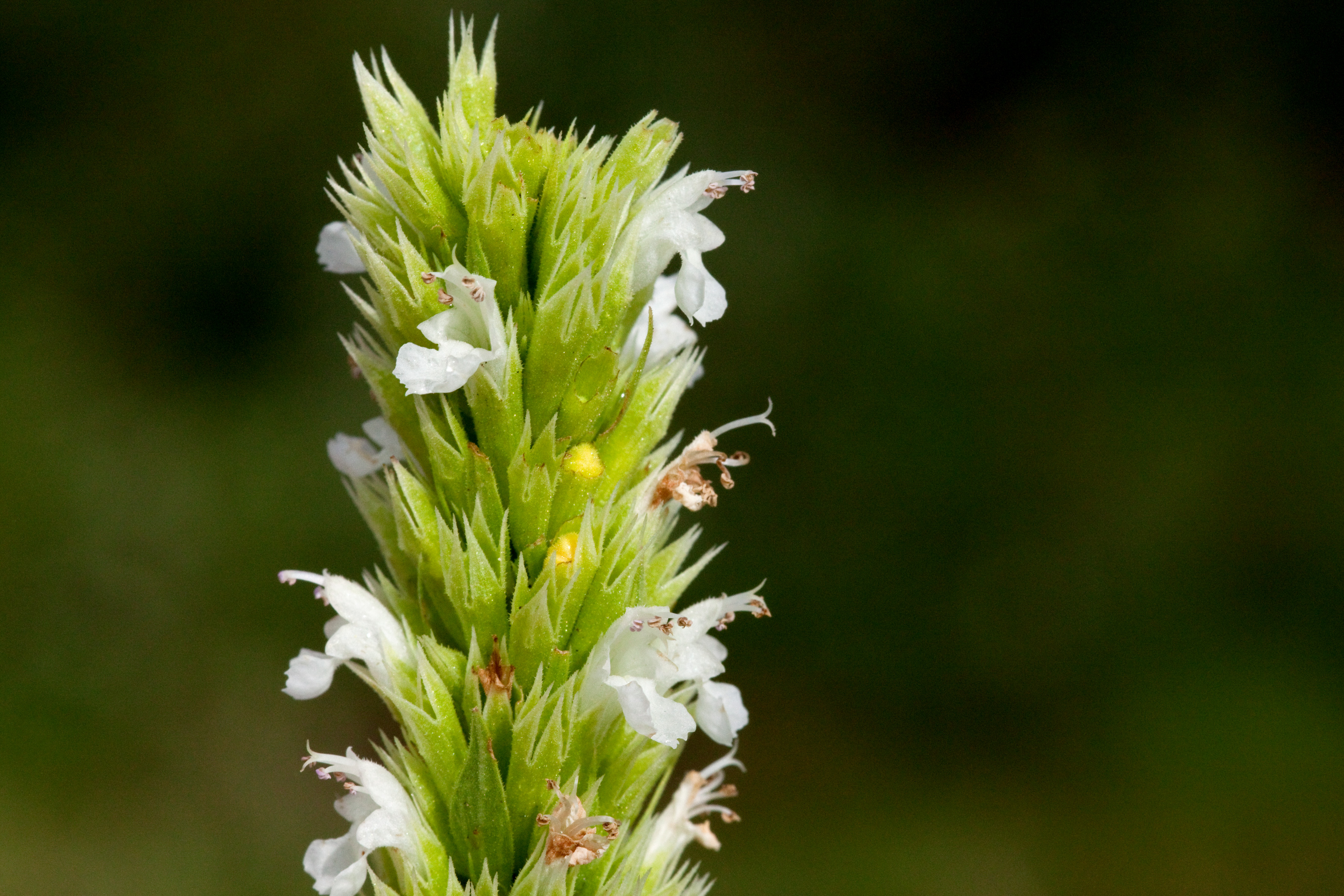
Flowers.

It is a perennial herb that grows up to 4 ft (120 cm) tall. Leaves are semi-evergreen, simple and opposite in arrangement. Flower petals are white to purple in color and bloom July to October. It grows in moist canyons.

== Uses ==
It is used by the Ramah Navajo as a ceremonial chant lotion, for bad coughs, and the dried, pulverized root used as dusting powder for sores or cankers. The Ramah also use it a fumigant for "deer infection", as a febrifuge, and to protect from witches.
