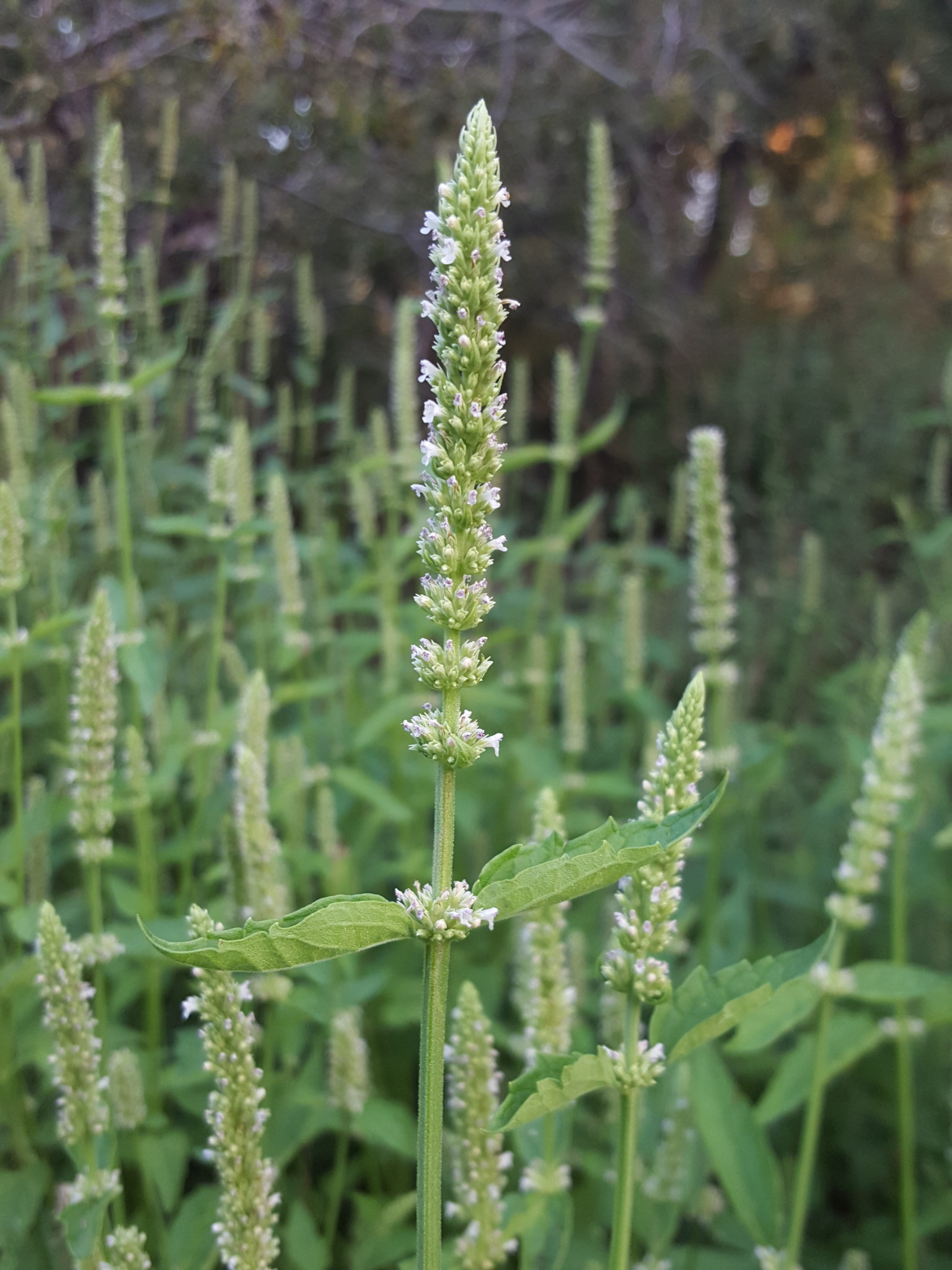

Scientific classification
- Kingdom: Plantae
- Clade: Tracheophytes
- Clade: Angiosperms
- Clade: Eudicots
- Clade: Asterids
- Order: Lamiales
- Family: Lamiaceae
- Genus: Agastache
- Species: A. micrantha

Binomial name
- Agastache micrantha (A.Gray) Wooton & Standl.

= Agastache micrantha =

Species of flowering plant

Agastache micrantha is a species of flowering plant in the mint family (Lamiaceae). It is native to the southwestern United States and northern Mexico.

== Description ==
Agastache micrantha is a perennial aromatic herb or subshrub, typically reaching up to about 60 cm in height. Plants arise from a woody caudex and produce numerous erect stems. Leaves are opposite and lanceolate, measuring approximately 1.5–4.5 cm long, with blades noticeably longer than wide. The upper leaf surface is pale green, while the lower surface is gray-green; margins are serrate and the apex is acute.

The inflorescence is a continuous terminal spike, about 8–10 cm long, composed of multiple closely spaced flower whorls. Flowers are small, with a tubular white corolla. The calyx is green to tan and encloses the developing fruit. Stamens and pistil are slightly exserted. The fruit consists of small nutlets, light brown in color and bearing fine hairs near the apex. Flowering generally occurs from late summer into early autumn.

== Distribution and habitat ==
Agastache micrantha occurs in the southwestern United States and northern Mexico. It is typically found on granitic substrates, including rocky outcrops and washes, within oak–grassland and pinyon–juniper vegetation zones. The species is most often encountered at mid to higher elevations, roughly between 1,500 and 2,300 m (5,000–7,500 ft).
