= Agastache cusickii =

Conservation status
- Vulnerable (NatureServe)

Scientific classification
- Kingdom: Plantae
- Clade: Tracheophytes
- Clade: Angiosperms
- Clade: Eudicots
- Clade: Asterids
- Order: Lamiales
- Family: Lamiaceae
- Genus: Agastache
- Species: A. cusickii

Binomial name
- Agastache cusickii (Greenm.) A.Heller

Species of flowering plant

Agastache cusickii is a species of flowering plant in the mint family known by the common name Cusick's giant hyssop. It is native to the northwestern United States from eastern Oregon and central Nevada to Idaho and Montana.

This perennial herb grows 10 to 20 centimeters tall from a woody taproot and caudex. Some of the stems spread horizontally underground. It has leaves covered in fine hairs and the fruits are nutlets. The spikelike inflorescence bears flowers with purple-tipped sepals and white corollas each about a centimeter long with protruding stamens. Blooming occurs in June through August.

This plant grows in sagebrush and alpine ecosystems. It grows in dry, rocky mountain habitat such as talus slopes. In Nevada it grows in limber pine and pinyon-juniper woodland habitat. On Steens Mountain in Oregon it has been observed among western juniper (Juniperus occidentalis), curlleaf mountain-mahogany (Cercocarpus ledifolius), and quaking aspen (Populus tremuloides). In the Tendoy Mountains of Montana it is associated with big sagebrush (Artemisia tridentata) and Indian ricegrass (Oryzopsis hymenoides) on limestone talus.
