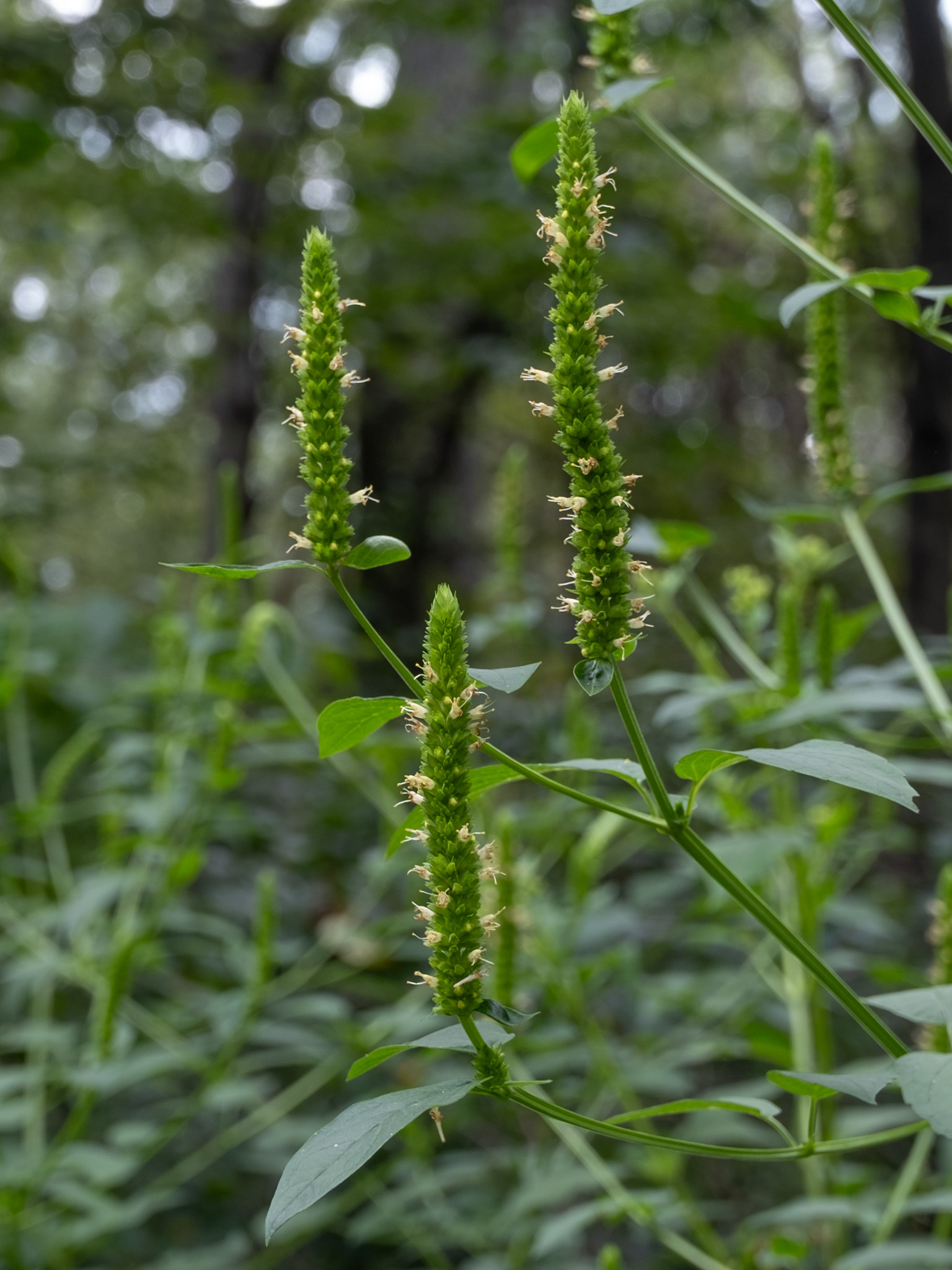

Conservation status
- Secure (NatureServe)

Scientific classification
- Kingdom: Plantae
- Clade: Tracheophytes
- Clade: Angiosperms
- Clade: Eudicots
- Clade: Asterids
- Order: Lamiales
- Family: Lamiaceae
- Genus: Agastache
- Species: A. nepetoides

Binomial name
- Agastache nepetoides (L.) Kuntze

Synonyms
- Hyssopus nepetoides lin. Lophanthus nepetoides Benth; Nepeta altissima Schrank Vleckia nepetoides Raf.

= Agastache nepetoides =

Species of flowering plant

Agastache nepetoides, commonly known as yellow giant hyssop, is a perennial flowering plant native to the central and eastern United States and Canada. It is a member of the Lamiaceae (mint) family.

== Description ==
A. nepetoides is a large plant, growing to 1.2–2.1 m (4–7 ft) tall as an erect stem with few branches. As with other plants in the mint family, the central stem is 4-angled as opposed to round. The stem is also hairless, or glabrous, and winged. The leaves are thin, ovate or ovate-lanceolate, and measure 5–15 cm (2–6 in) long and 3–7 cm (1–3 in) across. They are arranged oppositely on the stem and are coarsely toothed. The leaves do not have the fragrance usually associated with some other members of the mint family.

The flowers are greenish-yellow and appear as individual spikes at the end of the central stem and major secondary stems. Each spike is about 10–41 cm (4–16 in) long. Only a few of the densely packed flowers are in bloom at the same time.

== Distribution and habitat ==
The plant is native in the United States from Nebraska to the west, Georgia to the south, Massachusetts to the east, and the Canadian border to the north. In Canada, it is native in Quebec and Ontario. Its natural habitat is meadows, lowland woods and thickets, and upland deciduous woods.

== Conservation status in the United States ==
It is listed as endangered in Connecticut and Georgia, and as threatened in New York (state), Vermont, and Wisconsin.

== Ecology ==
The flowers bloom in the late summer and are very attractive to bees.

== Native American ethnobotany ==
The Haudenosaunee use a compound infusion of plants as a wash for poison ivy and itch.
