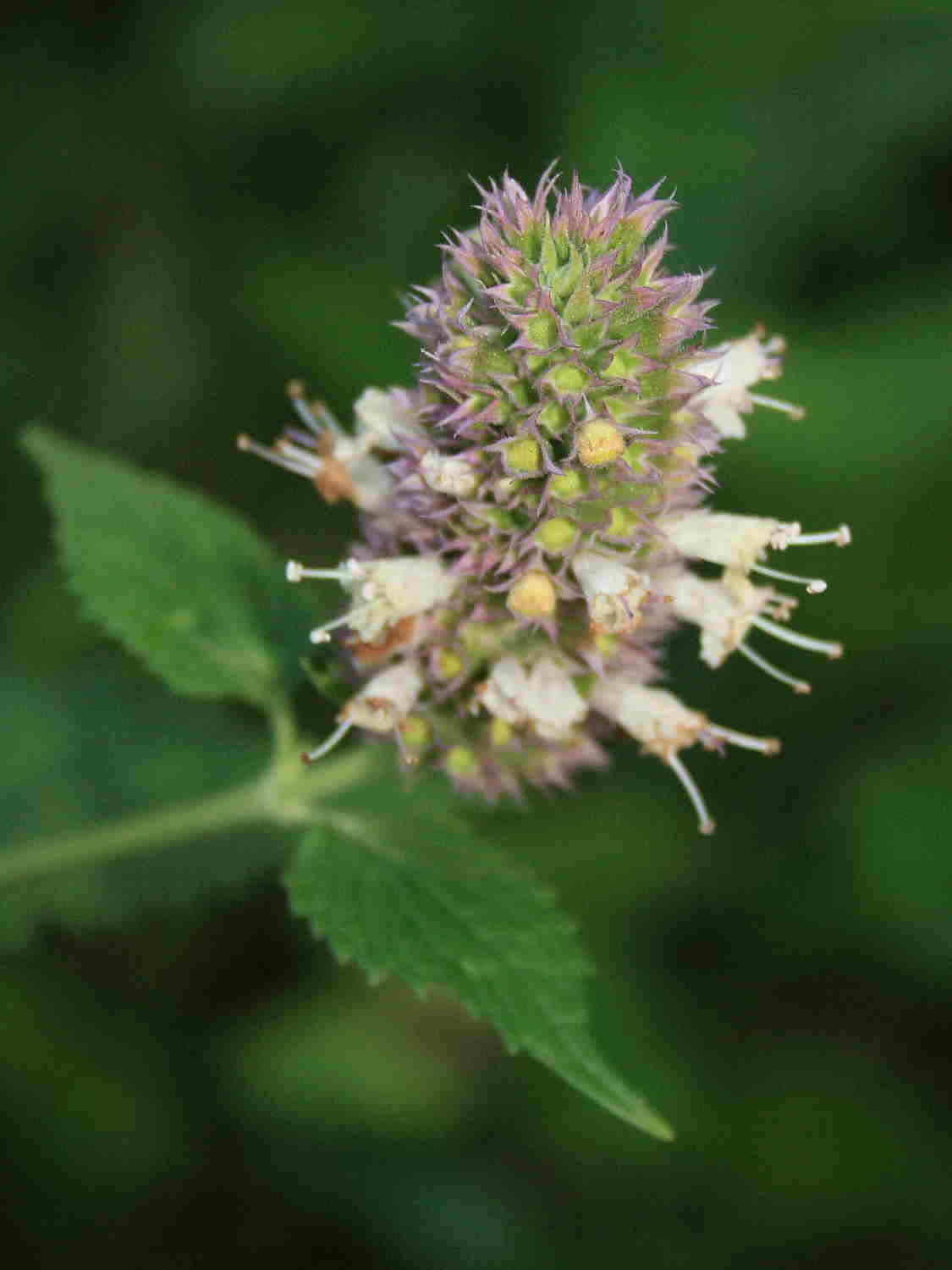
- Flowerhead

Scientific classification
- Kingdom: Plantae
- Clade: Tracheophytes
- Clade: Angiosperms
- Clade: Eudicots
- Clade: Asterids
- Order: Lamiales
- Family: Lamiaceae
- Genus: Agastache
- Species: A. occidentalis

Binomial name
- Agastache occidentalis (Piper) A.Heller

Synonyms
- Lophanthus occidentalis (Piper) K.Schum.; Vleckia occidentalis Piper

= Agastache occidentalis =

Species of flowering plant

Agastache occidentalis is a species of Agastache first described by Charles Vancouver Piper, and given its current name by Amos Arthur Heller. It is commonly known as western giant hyssop and giant horsemint.

== Range ==
It is found in seasonably wet areas west of the Cascades in Oregon and Washington.
