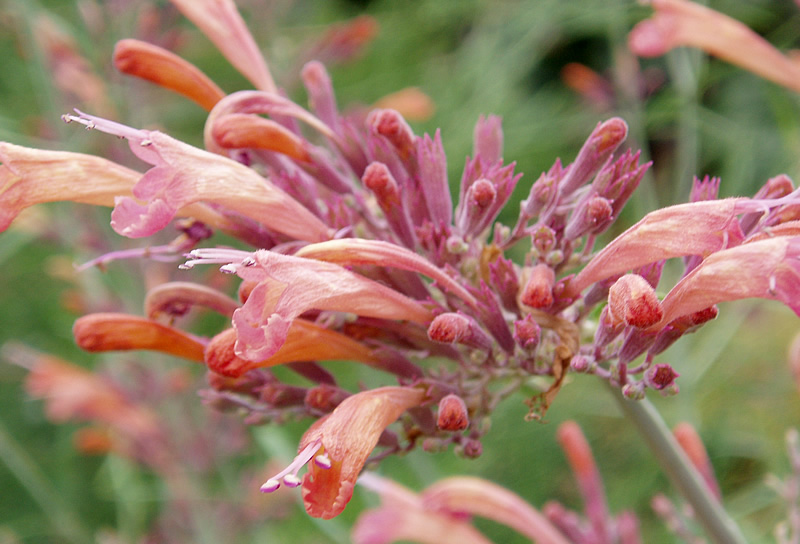

Scientific classification
- Kingdom: Plantae
- Clade: Tracheophytes
- Clade: Angiosperms
- Clade: Eudicots
- Clade: Asterids
- Order: Lamiales
- Family: Lamiaceae
- Genus: Agastache
- Species: A. rupestris

Binomial name
- Agastache rupestris (Greene) Standl.

= Agastache rupestris =

Threadleaf giant hyssop

Species of plant

Agastache rupestris, known as the threadleaf giant hyssop, Mexican Hyssop, or licorice mint, is a wildflower of the mint family (Lamiaceae) native to the mountains of Arizona, New Mexico, and Chihuahua, Mexico. Popular in xeriscaping because of its heat tolerance and ability to thrive in dry, nutrient-poor soil, it is often planted in containers or as a border flower and used to attract hummingbirds. Displaying gray-green stems and leaves while dormant, its orange flowers with purple buds bloom from mid-summer until fall; if crushed the petals exude a pleasant scent.

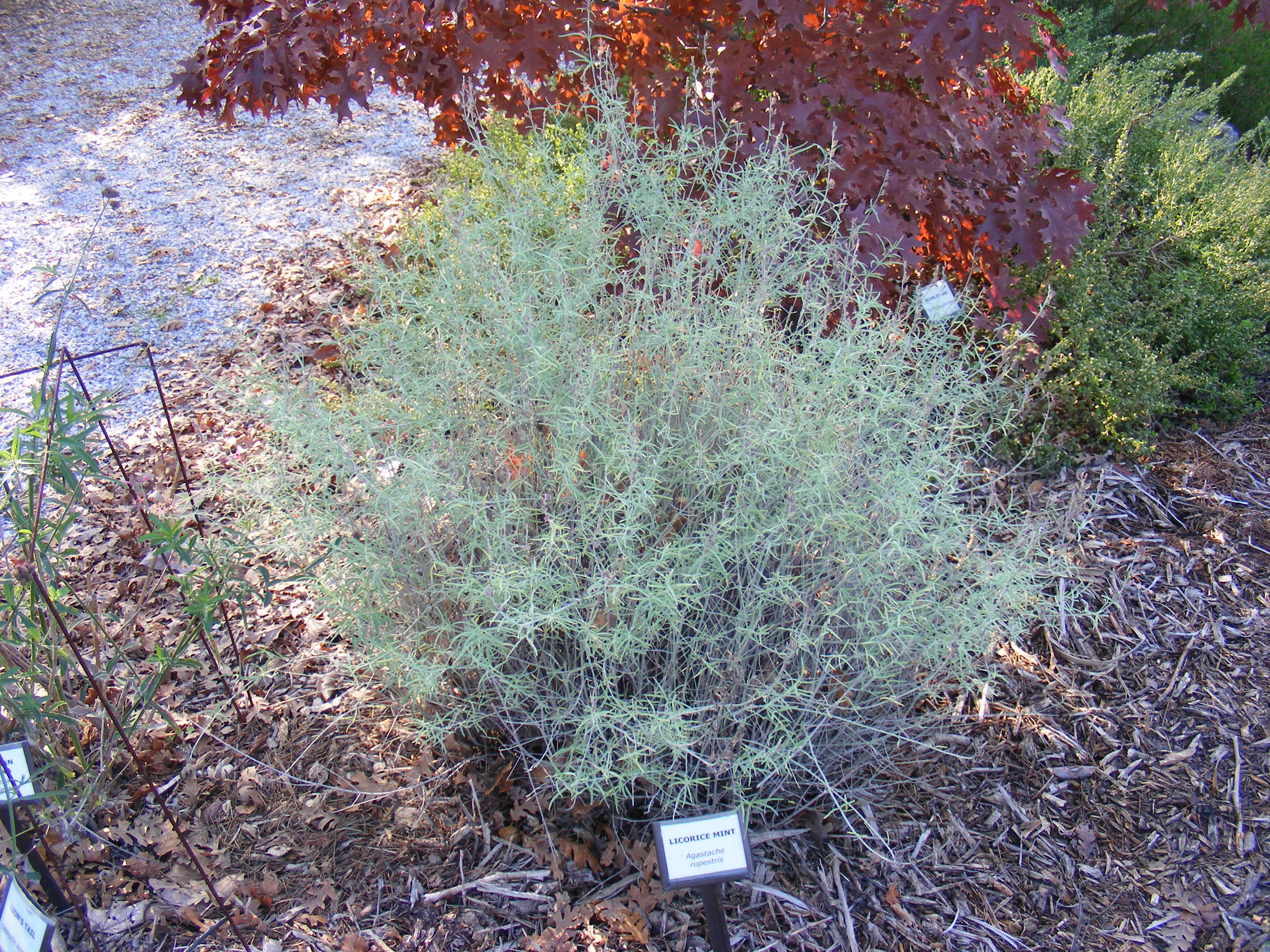

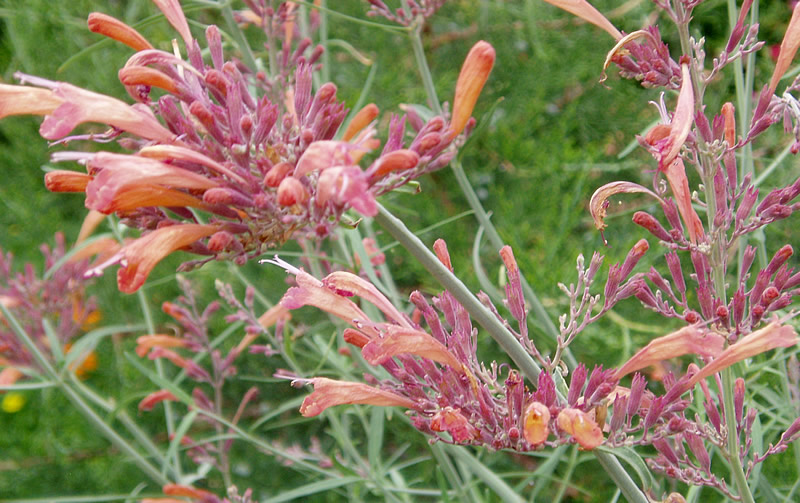
