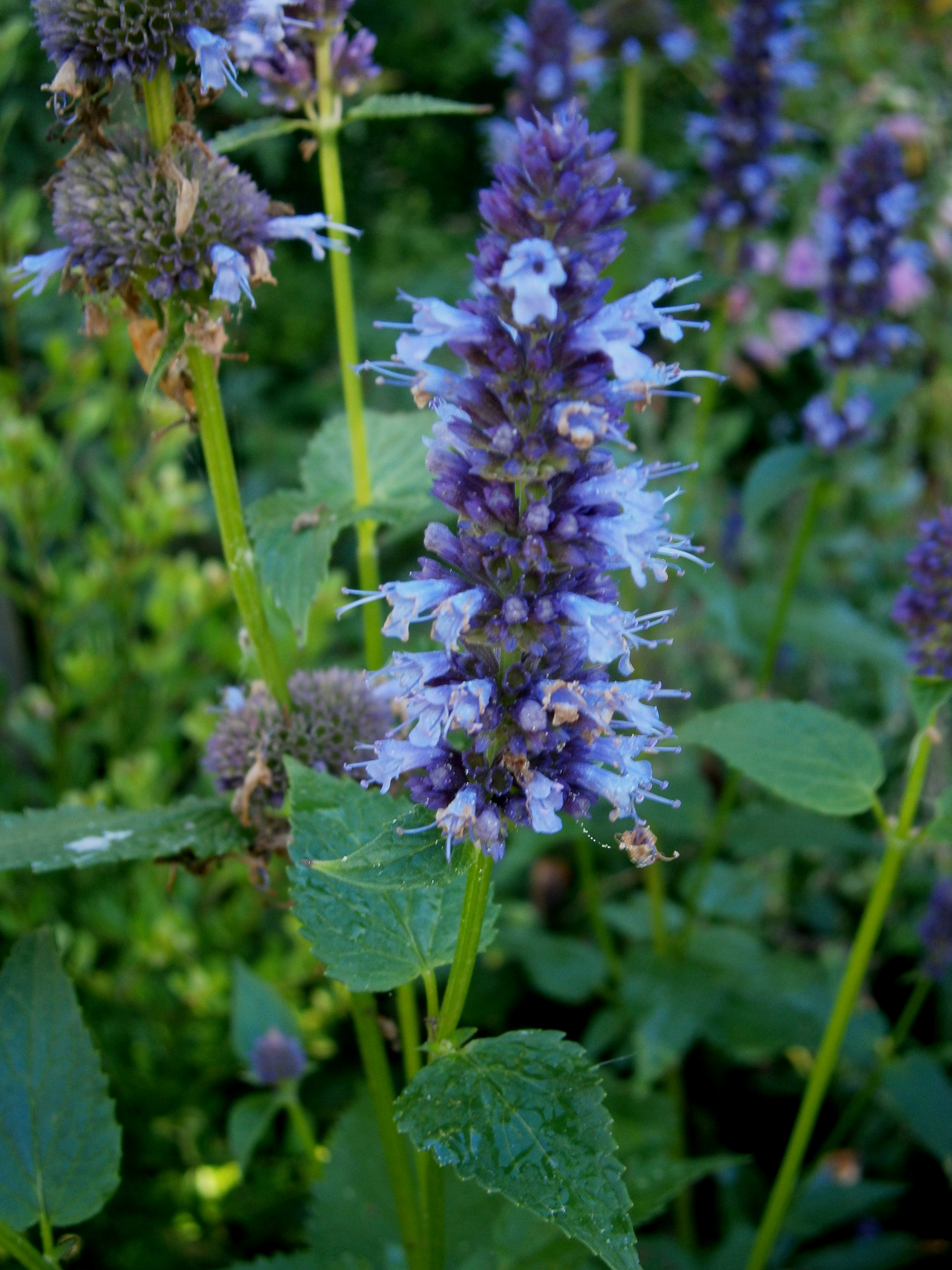

Conservation status
- Secure (NatureServe)

Scientific classification
- Kingdom: Plantae
- Clade: Tracheophytes
- Clade: Angiosperms
- Clade: Eudicots
- Clade: Asterids
- Order: Lamiales
- Family: Lamiaceae
- Genus: Agastache
- Species: A. foeniculum

Binomial name
- Agastache foeniculum (Pursh) Kuntze, 1891

Synonyms
- List: Agastache anethiodora (Nutt.) Britton & A.Br. (1898); Hyptis marathrosma (Spreng.) Benth. (1848); Hyssopus anethiodorus Nutt. (1813); Hyssopus anisatus Nutt. (1818); Hyssopus discolor Desf. (1829); Hyssopus foeniculum (Pursh) Spreng. (1818); Lophanthus anisatus (Nutt.) Benth. (1829); Lophanthus foeniculum (Pursh) E.Mey. (1831); Perilla marathrosma Spreng. (1818); Stachys foeniculum Pursh (1813); Vleckia albescens Raf. (1840); Vleckia anethiodora (Nutt.) Greene (1894); Vleckia anisata (Nutt.) Raf. (1837); Vleckia bracteata Raf. (1838); Vleckia bracteosa Raf. (1840); Vleckia discolor Raf. (1840); Vleckia foeniculum (Pursh) MacMill. (1892); Vleckia incarnata Raf. (1840)

= Agastache foeniculum =

Plant species in the mint family

Agastache foeniculum (syn. Agastache anethiodora (Nutt.) Britton), commonly called anise hyssop, blue giant hyssop, Fragrant giant hyssop, or the lavender giant hyssop, is a species of perennial plant in the mint family.

The plant is native to much of northern North America. It is tolerant of deer and drought, and is visited by many pollinators. The leaves and flowers are edible.

== Description ==
Growing from a taproot, the perennial plant grows to 0.6–1.2 metres (2–4 feet) in height, in a clumplike, upright shape. The leaves have an oval, toothed shape with a white tint underneath. The foliage has a scent resembling anise.

The plant blooms from June to September with bright lavender flowers that become more colorful near the tip. One plant may produce upwards of 90,000 individual flowers. They appear in showy verticillasters or false whorls, occasionally branching at the apex.

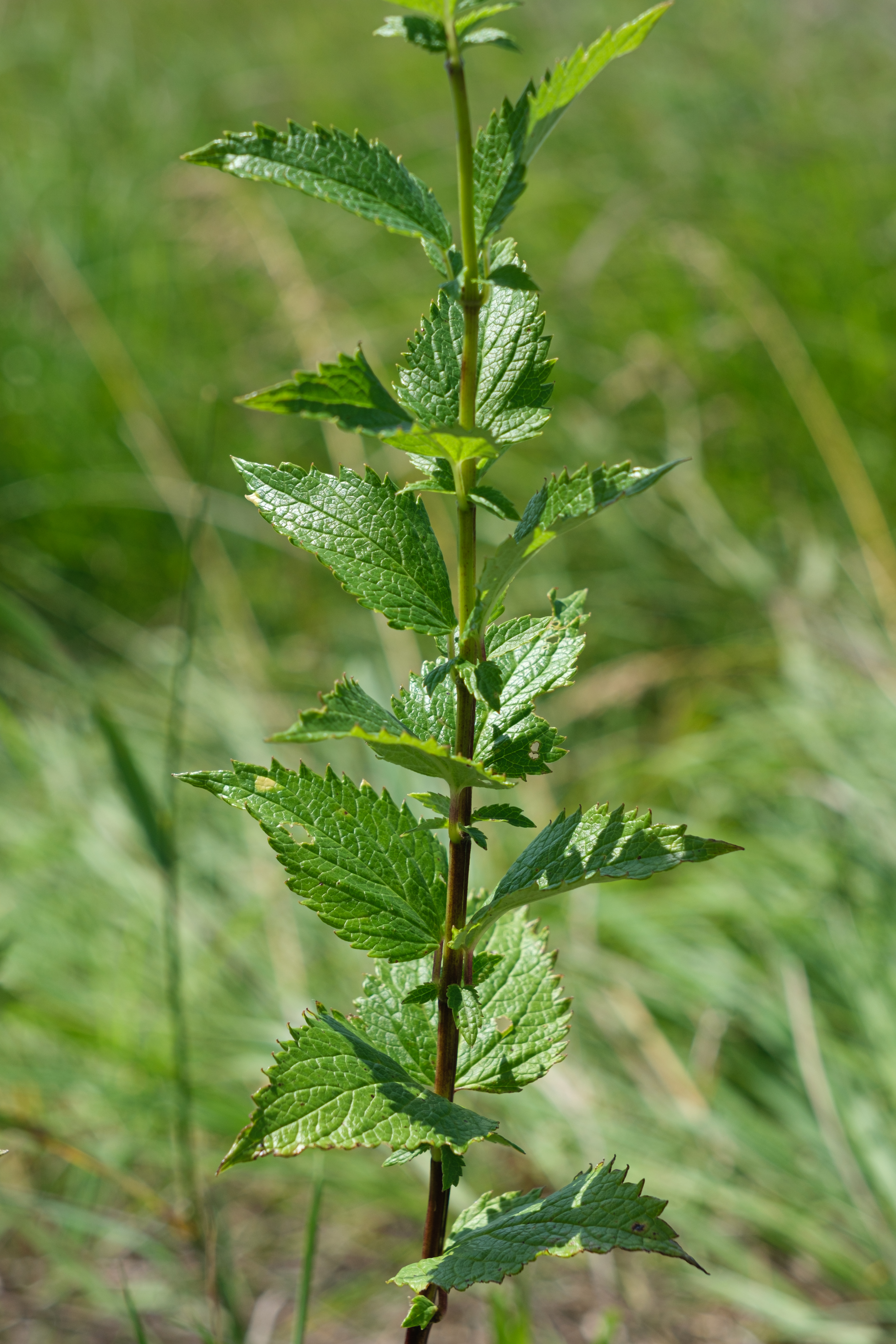
Leaves

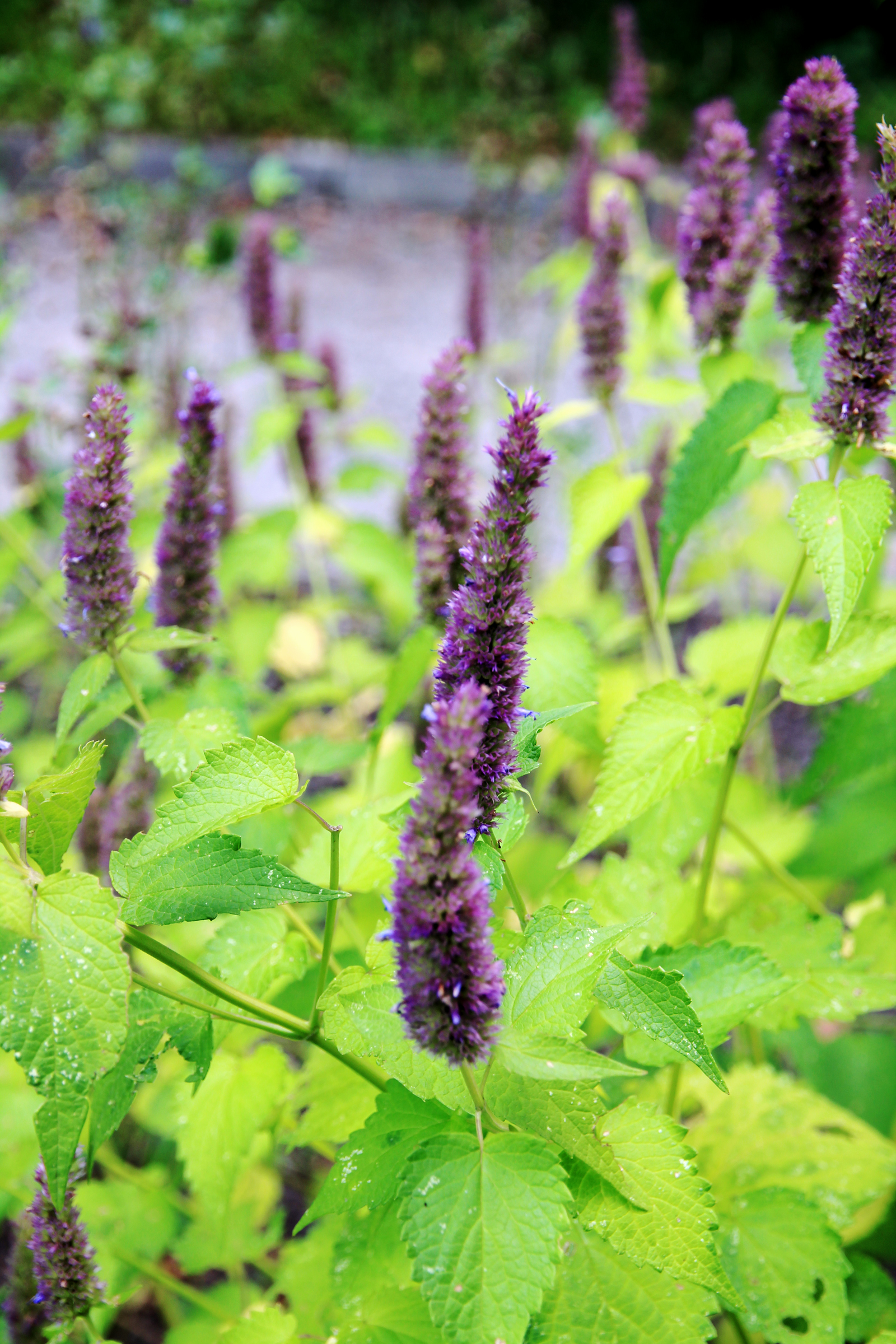
Purple flowers

=== Similar species ===
A. foeniculum is commonly confused with A. rugosa (which is sometimes sold as A. foeniculum) as well as A. scrophulariifolia. Anise hyssop is in the same family as hyssop (the mint family Lamiaceae), but they are not closely related. Hyssop (Hyssopus) is a genus of about 10–12 species of herbaceous or semi-woody plants native from the east Mediterranean to central Asia.

== Distribution and habitat ==
The plant is native to much of north-central and northern North America, notably the Great Plains and other prairies.

== Ecology ==
The species is tolerant of deer and drought, and attracts various potential pollinators, including hummingbirds, butterflies, bumblebees, honey bees, carpenter bees, and night-flying moths. Honey bees make a light fragrant honey from the flower's nectar. The plant is considered one of the premier species for feeding pollinators. The 1969 edition of [[J.&nbps;I. Rodale]]'s Encyclopedia of Organic Gardening claims that one acre of the species can support 100 honey-bee hives, the flowers blooming for a very long season, often from June until frost and during the time it blooms, one can see bees on the flowers from the morning until dusk. The many flowers of the plant provide forage for bees, butterflies and hummingbirds.

== Uses ==
The plant was used medicinally by the Cree, Cheyenne, and Ojibwe peoples to treat fevers, respiratory issues, and burns.

The leaves and flowers are edible raw or cooked and can be added to salads. If eaten in quantity, the leaves can have a drying effect. The leaves can also be used to make tea.
