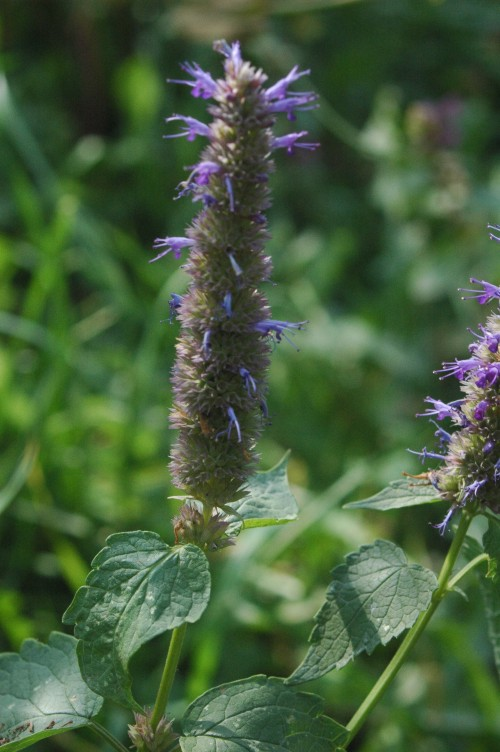

Scientific classification
- Kingdom: Plantae
- Clade: Tracheophytes
- Clade: Angiosperms
- Clade: Eudicots
- Clade: Asterids
- Order: Lamiales
- Family: Lamiaceae
- Genus: Agastache
- Species: A. rugosa

Binomial name
- Agastache rugosa (Fisch. & C.A.Mey.) Kuntze

Synonyms
- Agastache formosana (Hayata) Hayata ex Makino & Nemoto; Elsholtzia monostachys H.Lév. & Vaniot; Lophanthus argyi H.Lév.; Lophanthus formosanus Hayata; Lophanthus rugosus Fisch. & C.A.Mey.

= Agastache rugosa =

Species of flowering plant

Agastache rugosa, also known as wrinkled giant hyssop, Korean mint, purple giant hyssop, (Note: "Purple giant hyssop" also commonly refers to Agastache scrophulariifolia, which A. rugosa is often misidentified as.) Indian mint, Chinese patchouli, or Huoxiang (Chinese: 藿香; pinyin: huòxiāng), is an aromatic herb in the mint family, native to East Asia (China, Japan, Korea, Russian Primorye, Taiwan, India, and Vietnam).

== Description ==
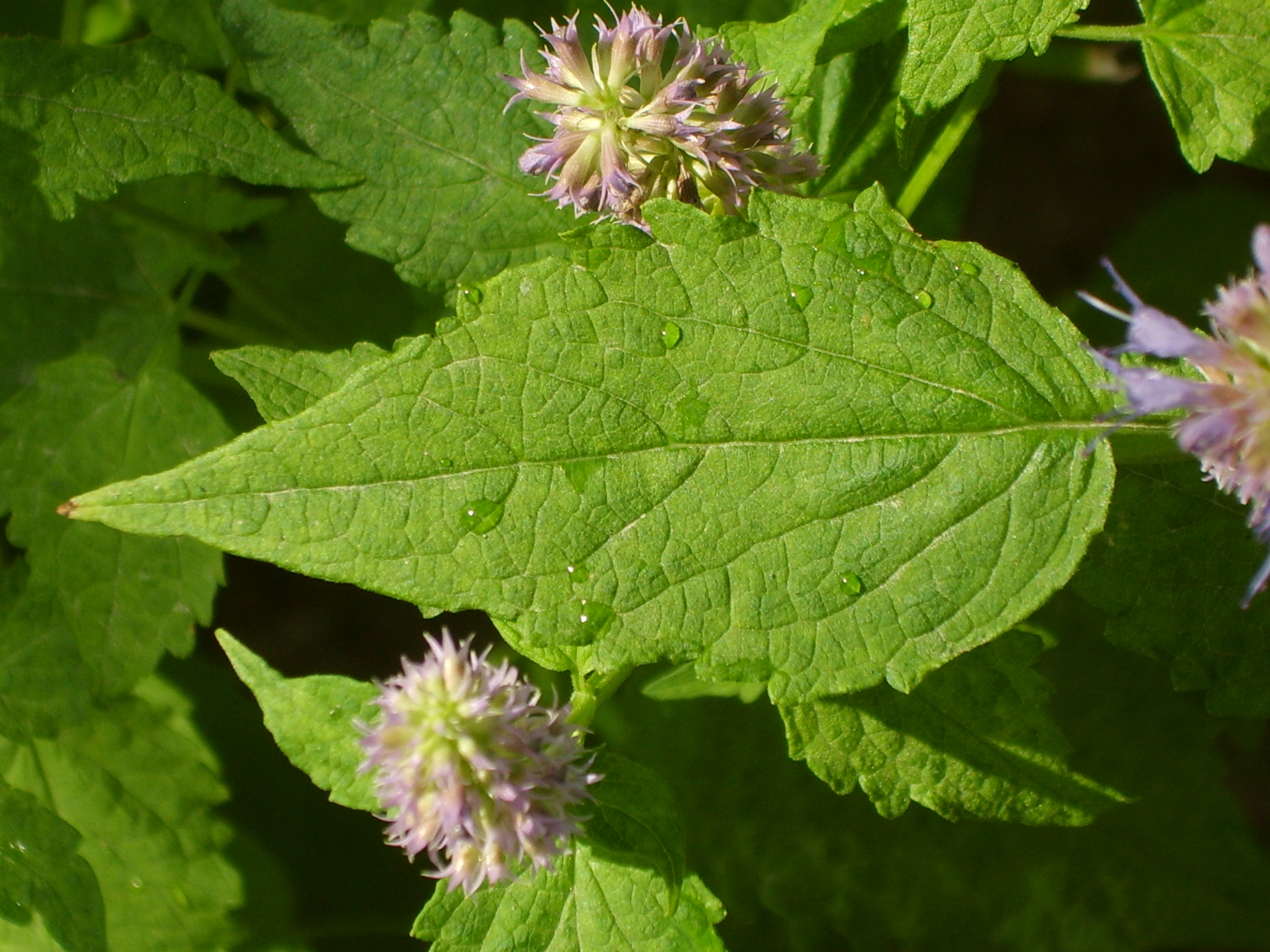
Korean mint leaf

A. rugosa is a perennial plant growing up to 40–100 centimetres (16–39 inches) tall, with square stalks that branch at the upper part. The oval-cordate leaves are oppositely arranged, 5–10 cm (2–4 in) long and 3–7 cm (1 1/4–2 3/4 in) broad, with coarsely serrated margins. Some leaves have hair and/or touches of white on the underside. The leaves are slightly larger than those of anise hyssop.

From July to September in the Northern Hemisphere, purple bilabiate flowers bloom in verticillasters that are 5–15 cm (2–6 in) long and 2 cm (3/4 in) broad. The calyx is 5–6 mm (0.20–0.24 in) long, with five narrow triangular lobes. The petals are 8–10 mm (0.31–0.39 in) long, lower ones longer and the ones inside serrated. They range in color from rose to violet. The stamens are didynamous, long, and exposed. The fruit is schizocarp, with obovate elliptical mericaps of 1.8 mm (0.071 in).

=== Chemical constituents ===
Chemical compounds found in the plant include:

- Estragole, plant
- p-Anisaldehyde, plant
- 4-methoxycinnamaldehyde, shoot
- Pachypodol, leaf
- Methylchavicol (60.01–88.43%),
- d-Limonene
- Caryophyllene
- Hexadecanoic acid
- Linoleic acid
- Octahydro-7-methyl-methylene-4-(1-methylethyl)-1H-cyclopenta[1,3]cyclopropa[1,2]benzene

== Cultivation ==
A. rugosa grows well in fertile, moisture-retentive soils and good sunlight. The aroma becomes weaker in shady conditions.

The plant can be propagated by both sexual and asexual means. The seeds gathered in autumn can be sown in the spring. One can also dig out the plant in autumn or early spring, divide the roots, and plant them at intervals of 30 cm (12 in).

=== Cultivars ===
There several cultivars, including 'Golden Jubilee', which has yellow-green foliage, 'Alabaster' and 'Fragrant Delight'. There are also a number of giant hyssop hybrids with A. rugosa as a parent, such as Agastache × 'Black Adder' and 'Blue Fortune', a Royal Horticultural Society Award of Garden Merit winner.

== Uses ==
=== Culinary ===
==== Korea ====
The plant's Korean name is baechohyang (배초향), but it is more commonly known as banga (방아) in southern parts of Korea, where the herb is extensively cultivated and consumed. In southern Korean cuisine, the herb is a popular last minute addition to various dishes, such as chueo-tang (pond loach stew), and maeun-tang (spicy fish stew). It is also sometimes used as the main ingredient in buchimgae (Korean pancakes).

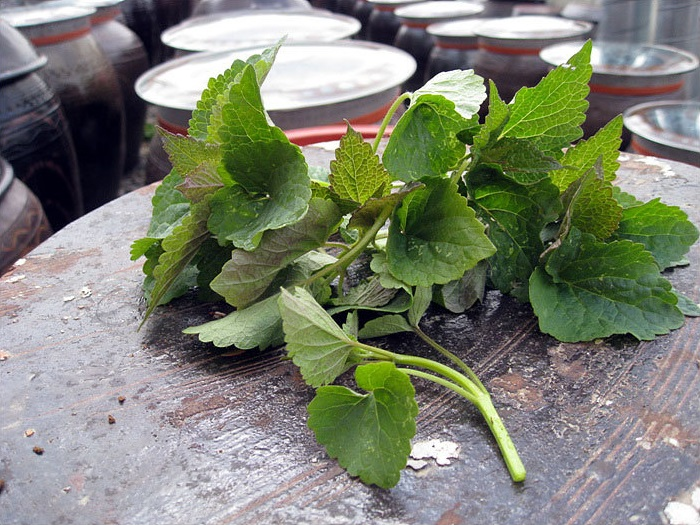
Korean mint leaves on onggi

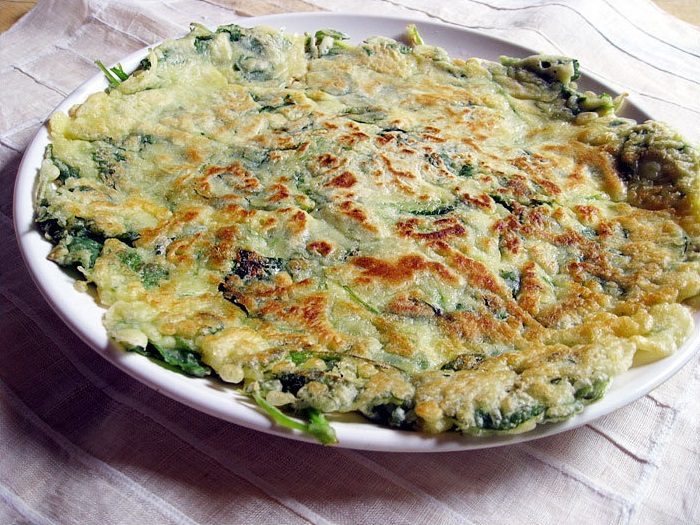
Banga-buchimgae (Korean mint pancake)

=== Medicinal ===
==== China ====
It is called huòxiāng (Chinese: 藿香) in Chinese and it is one of the 50 fundamental herbs used in traditional Chinese medicine. It is used interchangeably with guang huo xiang. It was traditionally used to relieve nausea, vomiting and poor appetite. It contains methyl chavicol, anethole, anisaldehyde, limonene, pinene and linalool.
