= 4-Methoxycinnamaldehyde =

Names
- Preferred IUPAC name (2E)-3-(4-Methoxyphenyl)prop-2-enal
- Other names p-Methoxycinnamaldehyde; p-Methoxycinnamaldehyde, trans-p-Methoxycinnamaldehyde; 3-(4-Methoxyphenyl)acrylaldehyde

Identifiers
CAS Number	24680-50-0
3D model (JSmol)	Interactive image
ChEMBL	ChEMBL452173
ChemSpider	556586
ECHA InfoCard	100.204.248
EC Number	217-807-0
KEGG	C10475
PubChem CID	641294
UNII	54098389BL
CompTox Dashboard (EPA)	DTXSID1044308
- InChI: InChI=1S/C10H10O2/c1-12-10-6-4-9(5-7-10)3-2-8-11/h2-8H,1H3/b3-2+ Key: AXCXHFKZHDEKTP-NSCUHMNNSA-N; InChI=1/C10H10O2/c1-12-10-6-4-9(5-7-10)3-2-8-11/h2-8H,1H3/b3-2+ Key: AXCXHFKZHDEKTP-NSCUHMNNBV
- SMILES: COC1=CC=C(C=C1)/C=C/C=O

Properties
Chemical formula	C_{10}H_{10}O_{2}
Molar mass	162.188 g·mol^{−1}

Hazards
- GHS labelling
Pictograms	(GHS07: Exclamation mark)
Signal word	Warning
Hazard statements	H315, H319, H335
Precautionary statements	P261, P264, P271, P280, P302+P352, P304+P340, P305+P351+P338, P312, P321, P332+P313, P337+P313, P362, P403+P233, P405, P501
- Except where otherwise noted, data are given for materials in their standard state (at 25 °C [77 °F], 100 kPa). Infobox references

4-Methoxycinnamaldehyde is a bioactive isolate of Agastache rugosa.
