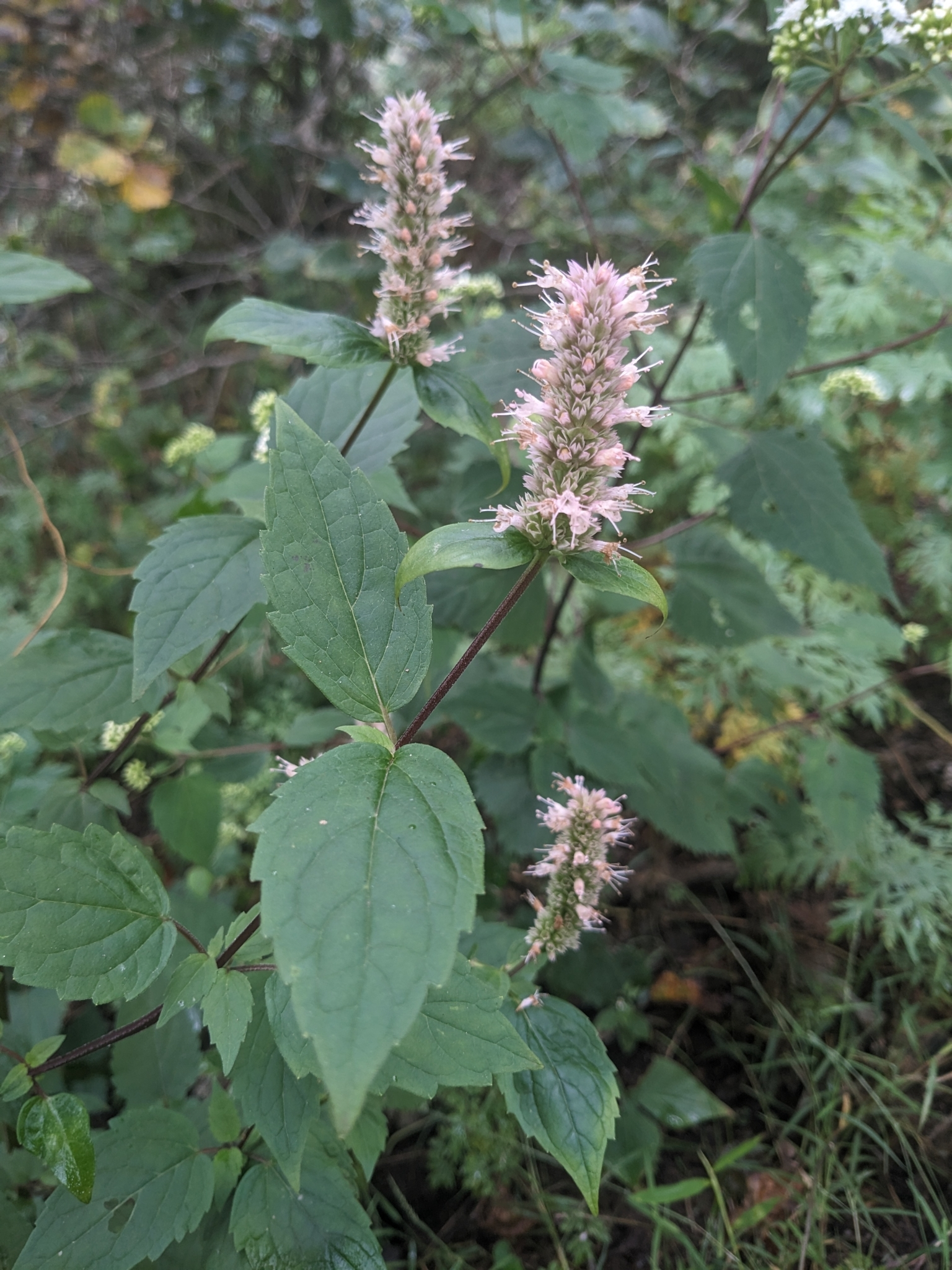
- Agastache scrophulariifolia

Scientific classification
- Kingdom: Plantae
- Clade: Tracheophytes
- Clade: Angiosperms
- Clade: Eudicots
- Clade: Asterids
- Order: Lamiales
- Family: Lamiaceae
- Genus: Agastache
- Species: A. scrophulariifolia

Binomial name
- Agastache scrophulariifolia (Willd.) Kuntze

= Agastache scrophulariifolia =

Purple giant hyssop

Species of flowering plant

Agastache scrophulariifolia, also known as the purple giant hyssop, (Note: "Purple giant hyssop" also sometimes refers to A. rugosa, which itself is sometimes mistakenly referred to as A. scrophulariifolia.) is a perennial plant that grows throughout the United States and northern Ontario, Canada. Its name comes from the similarity of its leaves to plants of the genus Scrophularia. It is a beneficial plant to pollinators and is noted for its medicinal properties, as many plants in the mint family are. It tends to grow in disturbed or open areas where it does not have to interact with non-native competitive plants.

== Description ==
Individuals of this species are perennial herbs that can grow up to six feet tall. They are late-flowering species in the mint family. Agastache scrophulariifolia tends to have several spiked inflorescence. Flowers of Agastache scrophulariifolia do not all bloom simultaneously and range from lavender to pink in color. The dark brown fruit they produce is a nutlet.

=== Similar species ===
In many cases, herbal and landscape plants identified as A. scrophulariifolia are actually A. foeniculum and A. rugosa.

== Distribution ==
A. scrophulariifolia was once distributed throughout CT, DC, DE, GA, IA, IL, IN, KS, KY, MA, MD, MI, MN, MO, NC, NE, NH, NJ, NY, OH, PA, SC, SD, TN, VA, VT, WI, WV, and ON, Canada. However, its range is now severely reduced in many areas and in some cases extirpated completely. These declines are largely due to habitat loss, predation by deer, and competition for resources with non-native plants.

A. scrophulariifolia tends to grow in riparian habitats, disturbed open areas, and meadows. The previously mentioned areas are ideal for because competition with other plants is reduced. It is a perennial plant that grows well in sandy loamy soils and requires sunlight for its seeds to germinate.

== Ecology ==
As riparian habitats are altered or farmlands return to forest communities, A. scrophulariifolia suffers from habitat loss. It is listed as endangered in Connecticut and Massachusetts, as threatened in Maryland and Vermont, and as a special concern in Kentucky and Tennessee.

== Usage ==
Many people use this plant for its aromatic effects. Its leaves are edible.

=== Medicinal ===
The Meskwaki use an infusion of the root as a diuretic, and also use a compound of the plant heads medicinally.
