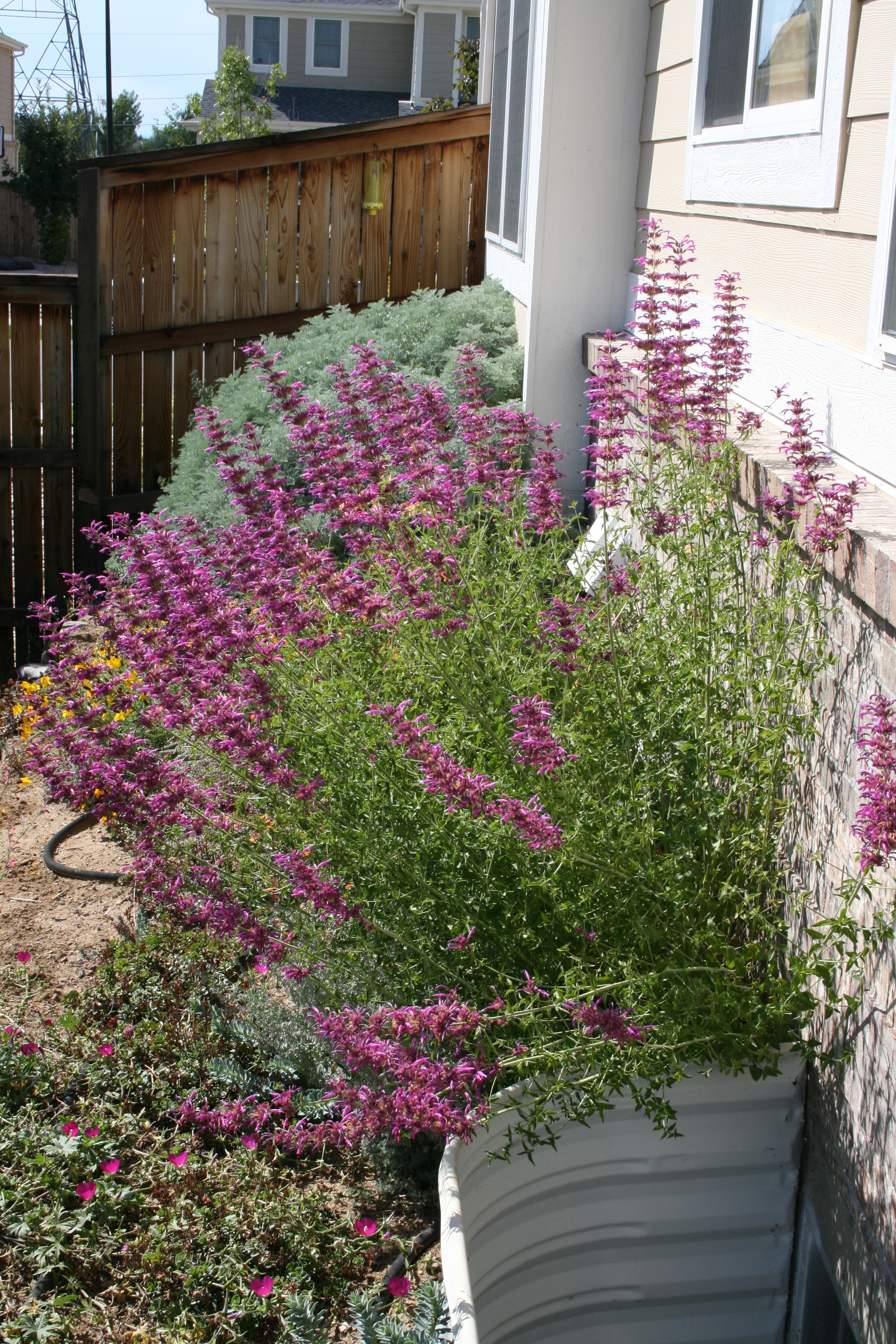

Scientific classification
- Kingdom: Plantae
- Clade: Tracheophytes
- Clade: Angiosperms
- Clade: Eudicots
- Clade: Asterids
- Order: Lamiales
- Family: Lamiaceae
- Genus: Agastache
- Species: A. cana

Binomial name
- Agastache cana (Hook.) Woot. & Standl.
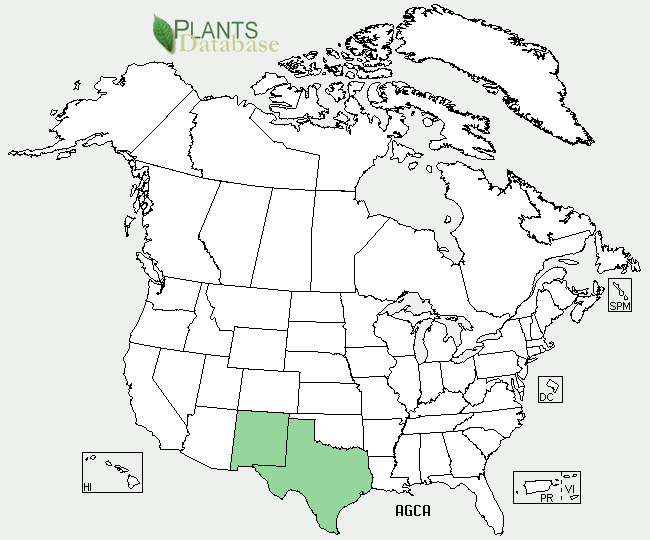
- Distribution of Agastache cana

= Agastache cana =

Species of flowering plant

Agastache cana, more commonly known as the mosquito plant, Texas hummingbird mint, and double bubble mint, is a hardy perennial belonging to the genus Agastache (pronounced /ˌæɡəˈstɑːkiː/). The genus name Agastache is derived from the Greek word meaning "a lot of", and stachy, meaning "spike", which refers to the flower's 12 terminal spikes that decorate the plant. These spikes remain through the growing season from early summer to late fall. The Mosquito Plant is native to New Mexico and western Texas, where it grows in mountainous areas at altitudes of 6,000 feet.

== Morphology ==
Individuals of this species grow to an average height of 3 feet by 2 feet wide in a shrub habit. It is an erect perennial species with ovate leaves, semi-woody structure, and profuse branching. The flowers of the mosquito plant are 5 zygomorphic petals fused into a tube shape. Two of these petals extend forward like a visor, while the other 3 petals form a reflexed lip. The flowers are arranged in whorls accompanied by compact spikes. The tubular shape flower blossoms as dark pink clusters and towers over the mint scented foliage. The fruit that arise from these plants divide into 4 dark nutlets each about 2 mm long. The grayish-green colored leaves (cana means grey) has a mint bubblegum fragrance. The flowers are hermaphroditic, which means the flower contains both male and female parts. A. cana is a prolific organism, which means it actively reproduces all growing season. It begins to blossom in early June and continues to bloom until late September.

== Habitat and ecology ==
This species is generally found in New Mexico and Texas in southern mountains at elevations of about 5,000–6,000 feet. They can be found in crevices and cracks of granite cliffs or in canyon edges. These elevations provide dry slopes and neutral pH soil for A. cana. This species is low maintenance. It prefers to grow in well-drained soil and needs full exposure to sun. This species needs good drainage in order to avoid overgrowth of mold and mildew in the soil. It needs medium amounts of water to sustain itself. A. cana is a drought-tolerant organism and can endure cold temperatures up to −20 °F. A. cana thrives in contained areas and herb gardens. It is an attractant of bees, butterflies, and hummingbirds. Butterflies are essentially drawn in by the scent of the flowers, while hummingbirds are attracted to the sweet nectar and tubular-shaped blossoms of bright reds or purples.

== Usage ==
The mosquito plant has obtained recognition for attracting broad-tailed hummingbirds that are used for migration pattern studies. It is also known to be an herb that is edible. Dried petals of the flower and leaves can be used in tea. This species is used for ornamental purposes for many rock garden homes in Texas, New Mexico, and Arizona.

A. cana is known for being a natural mosquito repellent, but this property has not been scientifically verified. Gardeners and herbalists speculate that its highly scented oils may work as repellant in the same way as citronella-geranium. To be effective, this oil would need to be rubbed on surfaces such as skin and clothing.

Contrary to statements previously on this page, is no scientific evidence that this plant can reduce mosquito populations, nor any plausible mechanism through which it would.
