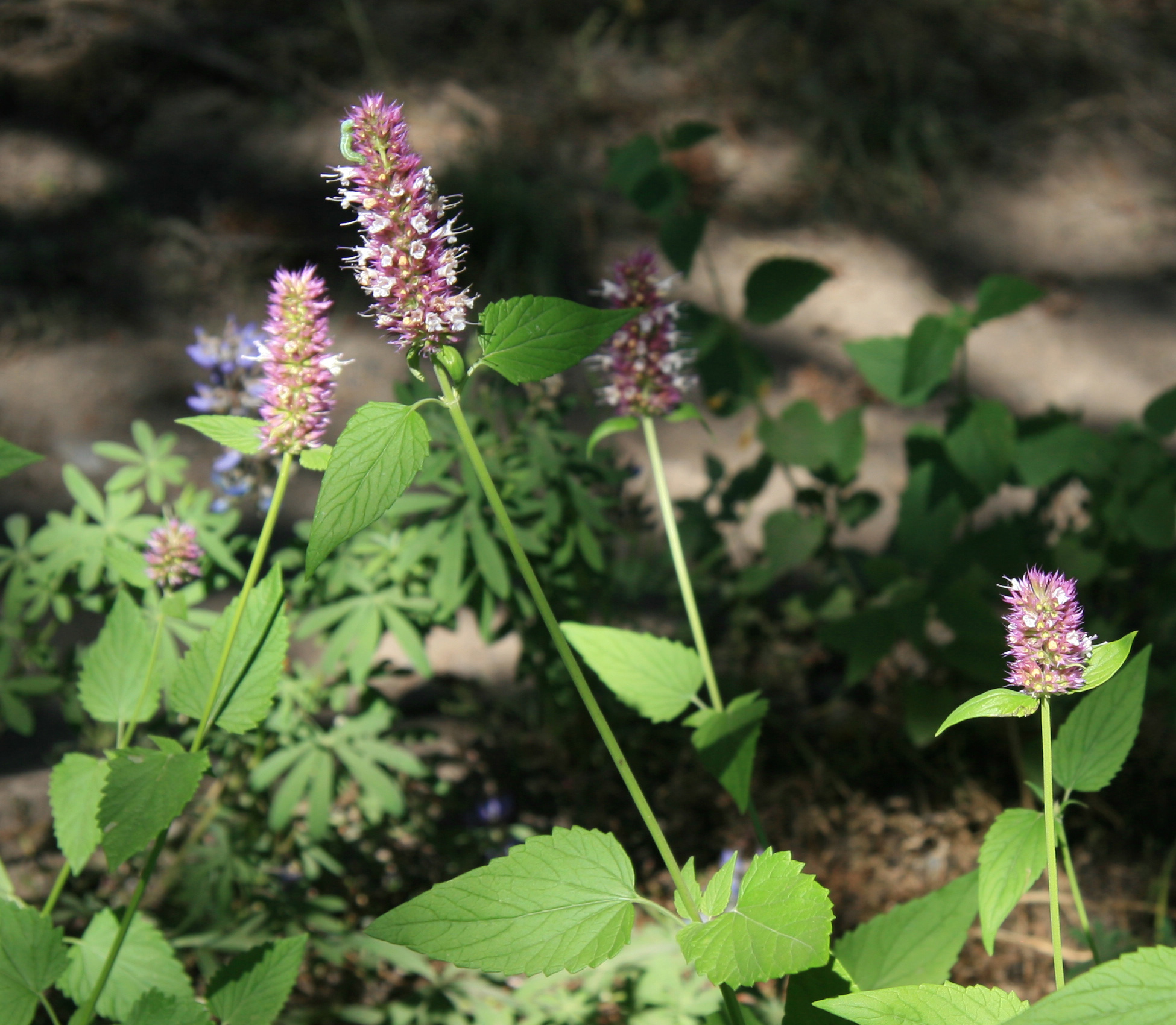

Conservation status
- Secure (NatureServe)

Scientific classification
- Kingdom: Plantae
- Clade: Tracheophytes
- Clade: Angiosperms
- Clade: Eudicots
- Clade: Asterids
- Order: Lamiales
- Family: Lamiaceae
- Genus: Agastache
- Species: A. urticifolia

Binomial name
- Agastache urticifolia (Benth.) Kuntze, 1891

Synonyms
- Lophanthus urticifolius Benth. (1829); Vleckia urticifolia (Benth.) Raf. (1837); Agastache glaucifolia A.Heller (1901)

= Agastache urticifolia =

Plant species in the mint family

Agastache urticifolia is a species of flowering plant in the mint family known by the common name nettleleaf giant hyssop or horse mint.

== Distribution ==
It is native to western North America from British Columbia to California to Colorado, where it grows in many habitat types. This is an aromatic perennial herb growing an erect stem with widely spaced leaves, each lance-shaped to nearly triangular and toothed.

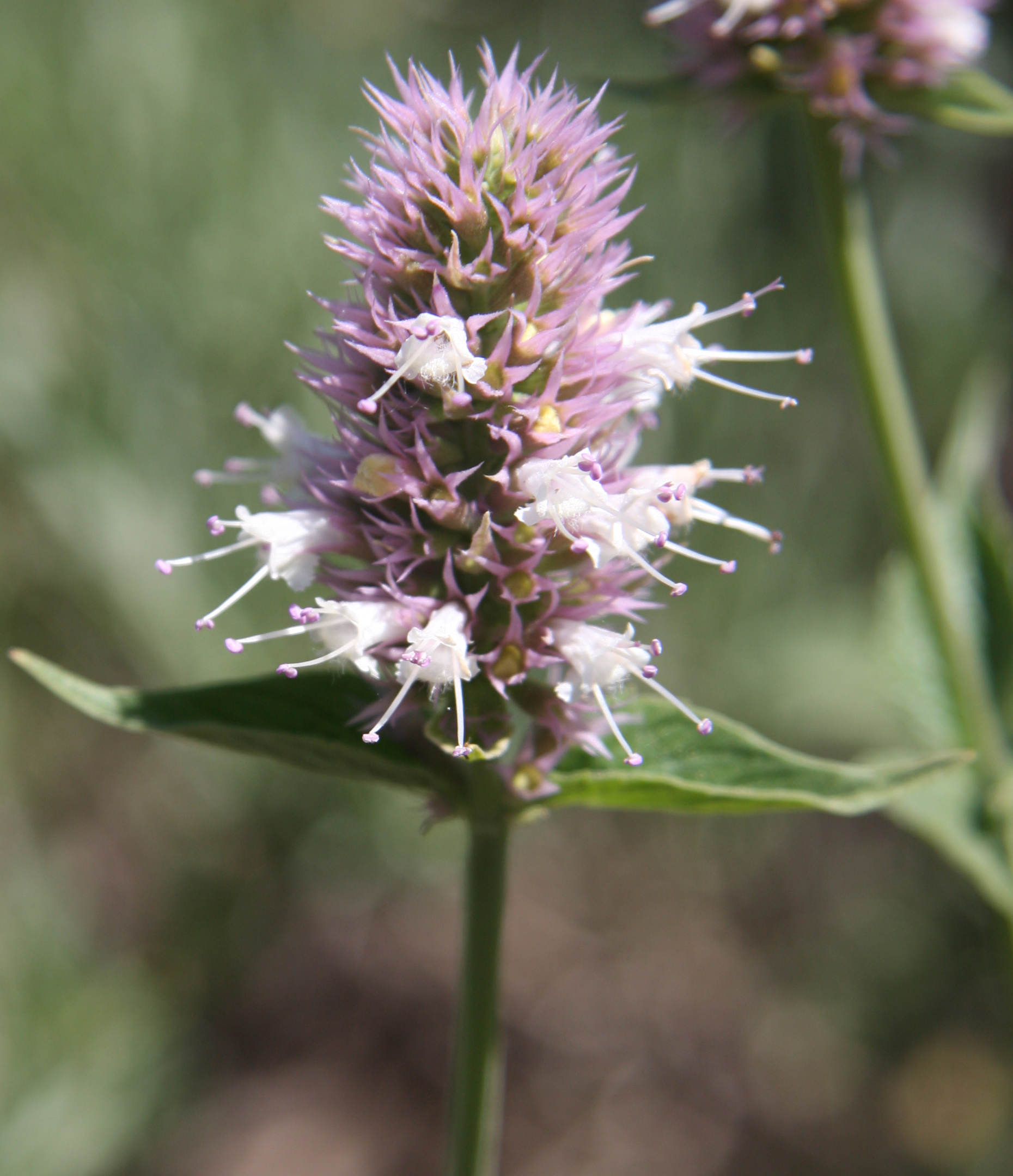
Closeup of Agastache urticifolia flowerhead

== Description ==
The leaves are up to 8 centimeters long and 7 wide. The inflorescence is a dense spike of many flowers. Each flower has long sepals tipped with bright purple and tubular corollas in shades of pink and purple. The fruit is a light brown, fuzzy nutlet about 2 millimeters long.

== Uses ==
The dried leaves and flowers can be made into tea. It has been used medicinally to treat rheumatism, upset stomachs, and colds.

The plant was used medicinally by several Native American groups, especially the leaves.
