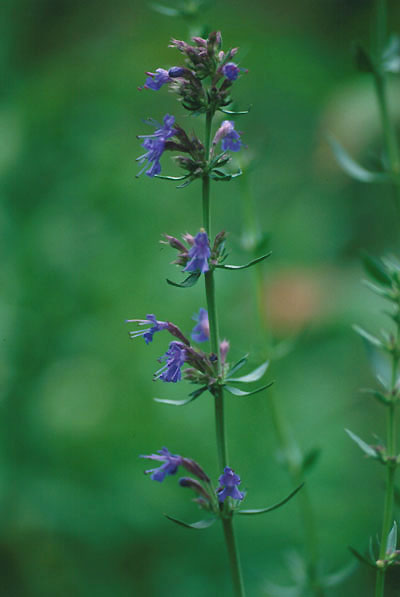
- Inflorescence

Scientific classification
- Kingdom: Plantae
- Clade: Tracheophytes
- Clade: Angiosperms
- Clade: Eudicots
- Clade: Asterids
- Order: Lamiales
- Family: Lamiaceae
- Subfamily: Nepetoideae
- Tribe: Mentheae
- Genus: Hyssopus; L., 1753

= Hyssopus (plant) =

Hyssop

Genus of flowering plants in the mint family

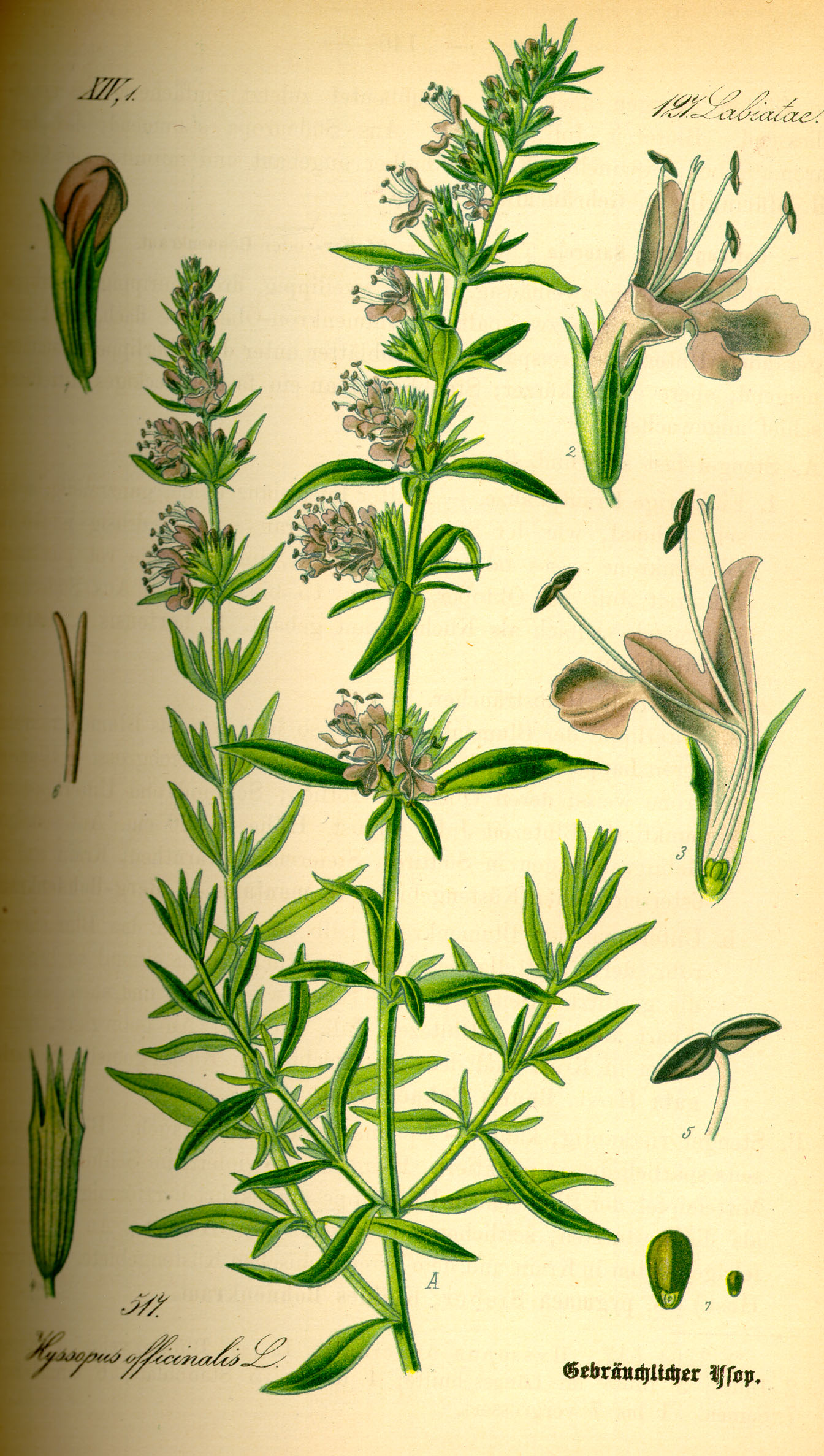
1885 illustration of H. officinalis

Hyssopus (hyssop) is a genus of herbaceous or semi-woody plants in the mint family (Lamiaceae), native from the east Mediterranean to central Asia as far east as Mongolia. They are aromatic, with erect branched stems up to 60 cm (24 in) long covered with fine hairs at the tips. The leaves are narrow oblong, 2–5 cm (0.8–2.0 in) long. The small blue flowers are borne on the upper part of the branches during summer. By far the best-known species is the herb hyssop (H. officinalis), widely cultivated outside its native area in the Mediterranean.

Though commonly called "hyssop", anise hyssop (Agastache foeniculum; also called blue giant hyssop) and all Agastache species are not members of Hyssopus. However, both genera are also in the mint family.

Species

1. Hyssopus ambiguus (Trautv.) Iljin ex Prochorov. & Lebel – Altai Republic of Russia, Kazakhstan
2. Hyssopus cuspidatus Boriss. – Altai Republic, Kazakhstan, Xinjiang, Mongolia
3. Hyssopus latilabiatus C.Y.Wu & H.W.Li – Xinjiang
4. Hyssopus macranthus Boriss. – Altai Republic of Russia, Western Siberia, Kazakhstan
5. Hyssopus officinalis L. – central + southern Europe, Algeria, Morocco, east to Iran
6. Hyssopus seravschanicus (Dub.) Pazij – Afghanistan, Pakistan, Kyrgyzstan, Tajikistan
7. Hyssopus subulifolius (Rech.f.) Rech.f. – Afghanistan.

== History ==
The name hyssop can be traced back almost unchanged through the Greek ύσσωπος (hyssopos). The name hyssop appears in some translations of the Bible, but researchers have suggested that the Biblical accounts refer not to the plant currently known as hyssop but rather to a related herb. The Septuagint translates the name as ὕσσωπος hyssop, and English translations of the Bible often follows this rendering. The Hebrew word אזוב (esov or esob) and the Greek word ὕσσωπος probably share a common (unknown) origin. The biblical plant is discussed further at ezov.

== Uses ==
The herb hyssop is used both as a condiment and a medicine. Hyssop leaves and flowers are used to flavor salads and soups. It is also used in the preparation of liqueurs and perfumes. In addition, it is used as a pot herb.

This herb is traditionally used in the treatment of throat and lung complaints, and is regarded as a stimulant, carminative, and expectorant. It is sometimes used for treating pulmonary, digestive, uterine, urinary and asthma problems, but there is limited clinical evidence of its effectiveness for these conditions, and it may be unsafe during pregnancy or breastfeeding.

In addition to its use as a flavoring agent in bitters and tonics, hyssop oil is also used in perfumery. Hyssop oil is used as a fragrance and should not be taken orally, as it may trigger seizures or make them worse, especially in children.

== See also ==
- Agastache, commonly known as giant hyssop
- Za'atar
- Ezov
