= Phenolic content in wine =

Wine chemistry

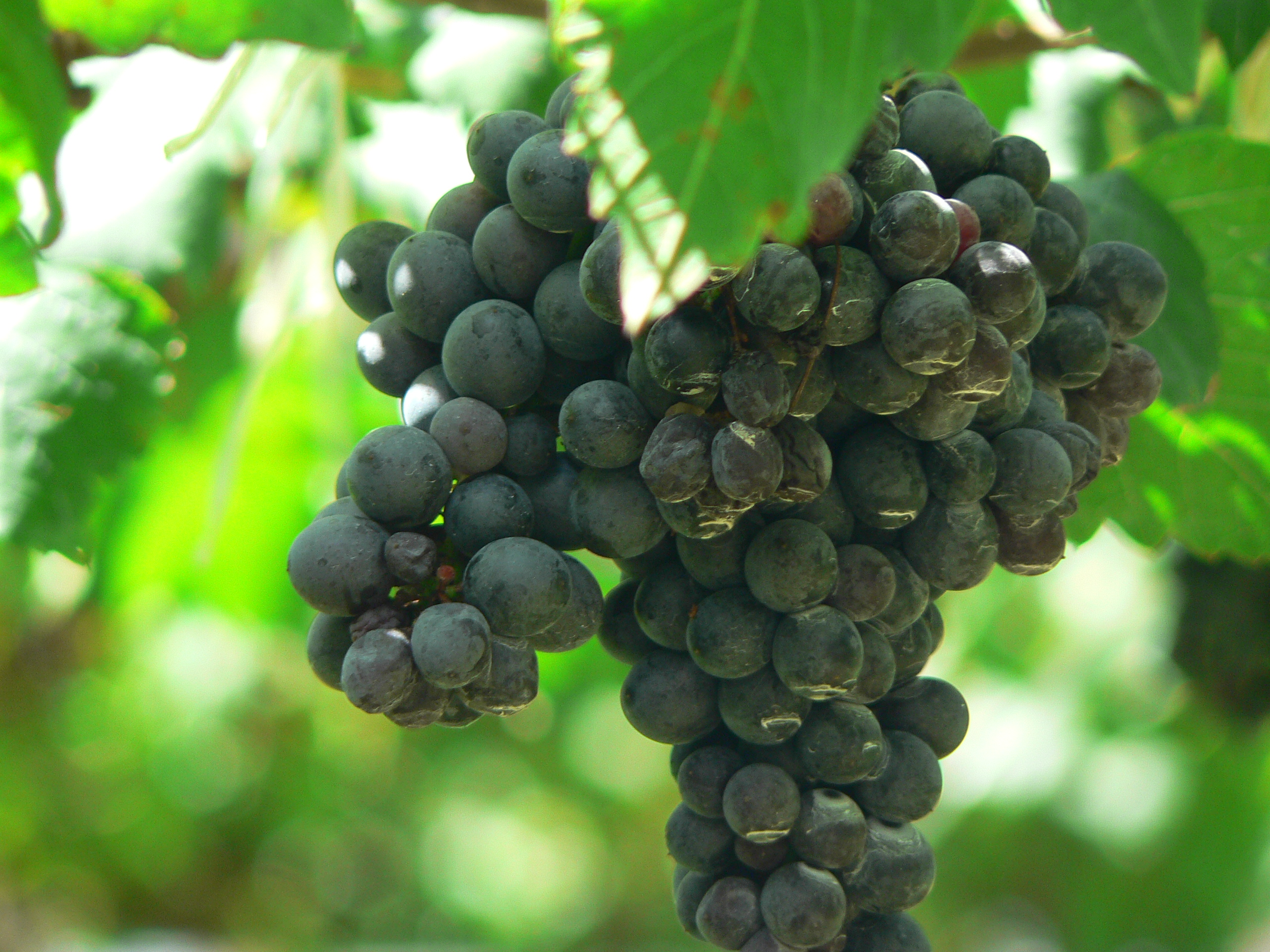
The phenolic compounds in grapes contribute to the taste, aroma, bouquet, color and mouthfeel of wine. Syrah pictured here.

Phenolic compounds—natural phenol and polyphenols—occur naturally in wine. These include a large group of several hundred chemical compounds that affect the taste, aroma, bouquet, color and mouthfeel of wine. These compounds include phenolic acids, stilbenoids, flavonols, dihydroflavonols, anthocyanins (enocyanin), flavanol monomers (catechins) and flavanol polymers (proanthocyanidins). This large group of natural phenols can be broadly separated into two categories, flavonoids and non-flavonoids. Flavonoids include the anthocyanins and tannins which contribute to the color and mouthfeel of the wine. The non-flavonoids include the stilbenoids such as resveratrol and phenolic acids such as benzoic, caffeic and cinnamic acids.

== Origin of the phenolic compounds ==
The natural phenols are not evenly distributed within the grape. Phenolic acids are largely present in the pulp, anthocyanins and stilbenoids in the skin, and other phenols (catechins, proanthocyanidins and flavonols) in the skin and the seeds. During the growth cycle of the grapevine, sunlight will increase the concentration of phenolics in the grape berries, their development being an important component of canopy management. The proportion of the different phenols in any one wine will therefore vary according to the type of vinification. Red wine will be richer in phenols abundant in the skin and seeds, such as enocyanin, proanthocyanidins and flavonols, whereas the phenols in white wine will essentially originate from the pulp, and these will be the phenolic acids together with lower amounts of catechins and stilbenes. Red wines will also have the phenols found in white wines.

Wine simple phenols are further transformed during wine aging into complex molecules formed notably by the condensation of proanthocyanidins and anthocyanins, which explains the modification in the color. Anthocyanins react with catechins, proanthocyanidins and other wine components during wine aging to form new polymeric pigments resulting in a modification of the wine color and a lower astringency. Average total polyphenol content measured by the Folin method is 216 mg/100 ml for red wine and 32 mg/100 ml for white wine. The content of phenols in rosé wine (82 mg/100 ml) is intermediate between that in red and white wines.

In winemaking, the process of maceration or "skin contact" is used to increase the concentration of phenols in wine. Phenolic acids are found in the pulp or juice of the wine and can be commonly found in white wines which usually do not go through a maceration period. The process of oak aging can also introduce phenolic compounds into wine, most notably vanillin which adds vanilla aroma to wines.

Most wine phenols are classified as secondary metabolites and were not thought to be active in the primary metabolism and function of the grapevine. However, there is evidence that in some plants flavonoids play a role as endogenous regulators of auxin transport. They are water-soluble and are usually secreted into the vacuole of the grapevine as glycosides.

== Grape polyphenols ==
Vitis vinifera, the common grape vine, from which European style wines are made the world over, produces many phenolic compounds. There is a varietal effect on the relative composition.

=== Flavonoids ===
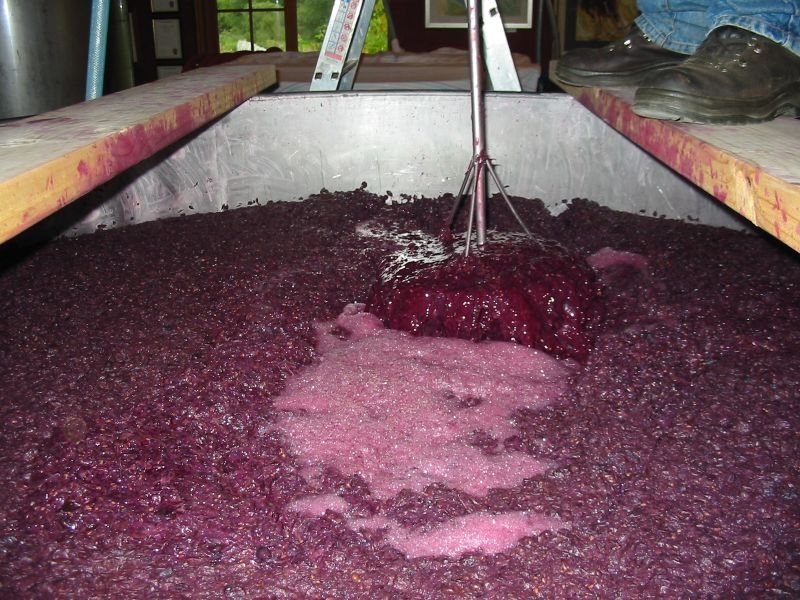
The process of maceration or extended skin contact allows the extraction of phenolic compounds from the skins of the grape into the wine

In red wine, up to 90% of the wine's phenolic content falls under the classification of flavonoids. These phenols, mainly derived from the stems, seeds and skins are often leached out of the grape during the maceration period of winemaking. The amount of phenols leached is known as extraction. These compounds contribute to the astringency, color and mouthfeel of the wine. In white wines the number of flavonoids is reduced due to the lesser contact with the skins that they receive during winemaking. There is on-going study into the health benefits of wine derived from the antioxidant and chemopreventive properties of flavonoids.

==== Flavonols ====
Within the flavonoid category is a subcategory known as flavonols, which includes the yellow pigment - quercetin. Like other flavonoids, the concentration of flavonols in the grape berries increases as they are exposed to sunlight. Wine grapes facing too much sun exposure can see an accelerated ripening period, leading to a lessened ability for the synthesis of flavonols. Some viticulturalists will use measurement of flavonols such as quercetin as an indication of a vineyard's sun exposure and the effectiveness of canopy management techniques.

==== Anthocyanins ====
Anthocyanins are phenolic compounds found throughout the plant kingdom, being frequently responsible for the blue to red colors found in flowers, fruits and leaves. In wine grapes, they develop during the stage of veraison, when the skin of red wine grapes changes color from green to red to black. As the sugars in the grape increase during ripening so does the concentration of anthocyanins. An issue associated with climate change has been the accumulation of sugars within the grape accelerating rapidly and outpacing the accumulation of anthocyanins, in particular of enocyanin, the main colorant of red wine. This leaves viticulturists with the choice of harvesting grapes with too high sugar content or with too low enocyanin content. In most grapes anthocyanins are found only in the outer cell layers of the skin, leaving the grape juice inside virtually colorless. Therefore, to get color pigmentation in the wine, the fermenting must needs to be in contact with the grape skins in order for the anthocyanins to be extracted. Hence, white wine can be made from red wine grapes in the same way that many white sparkling wines are made from the red wine grapes of Pinot noir and Pinot Meunier. The exception to this is the small class of grapes known as teinturiers, such as Alicante Bouschet, which have a small amount of anthocyanins in the pulp that produces pigmented juice.

There are several types of anthocyanins (as the glycoside) found in wine grapes which are responsible for the vast range of coloring from ruby red through to dark black found in wine grapes. Ampelographers can use this observation to assist in the identification of different grape varieties. The European vine family Vitis vinifera is characterized by anthocyanins that are composed of only one molecule of glucose while non-vinifera vines such as hybrids and the American Vitis labrusca will have anthocyanins with two molecules. This phenomenon is due to a double mutation in the anthocyanin 5-O-glucosyltransferase gene of V. vinifera. In the mid-20th century, French ampelographers used this knowledge to test the various vine varieties throughout France to identify which vineyards still contained non-vinifera plantings.

Red-berried Pinot grape varieties are also known to not synthesize para-coumaroylated or acetylated anthocyanins as other varieties do.

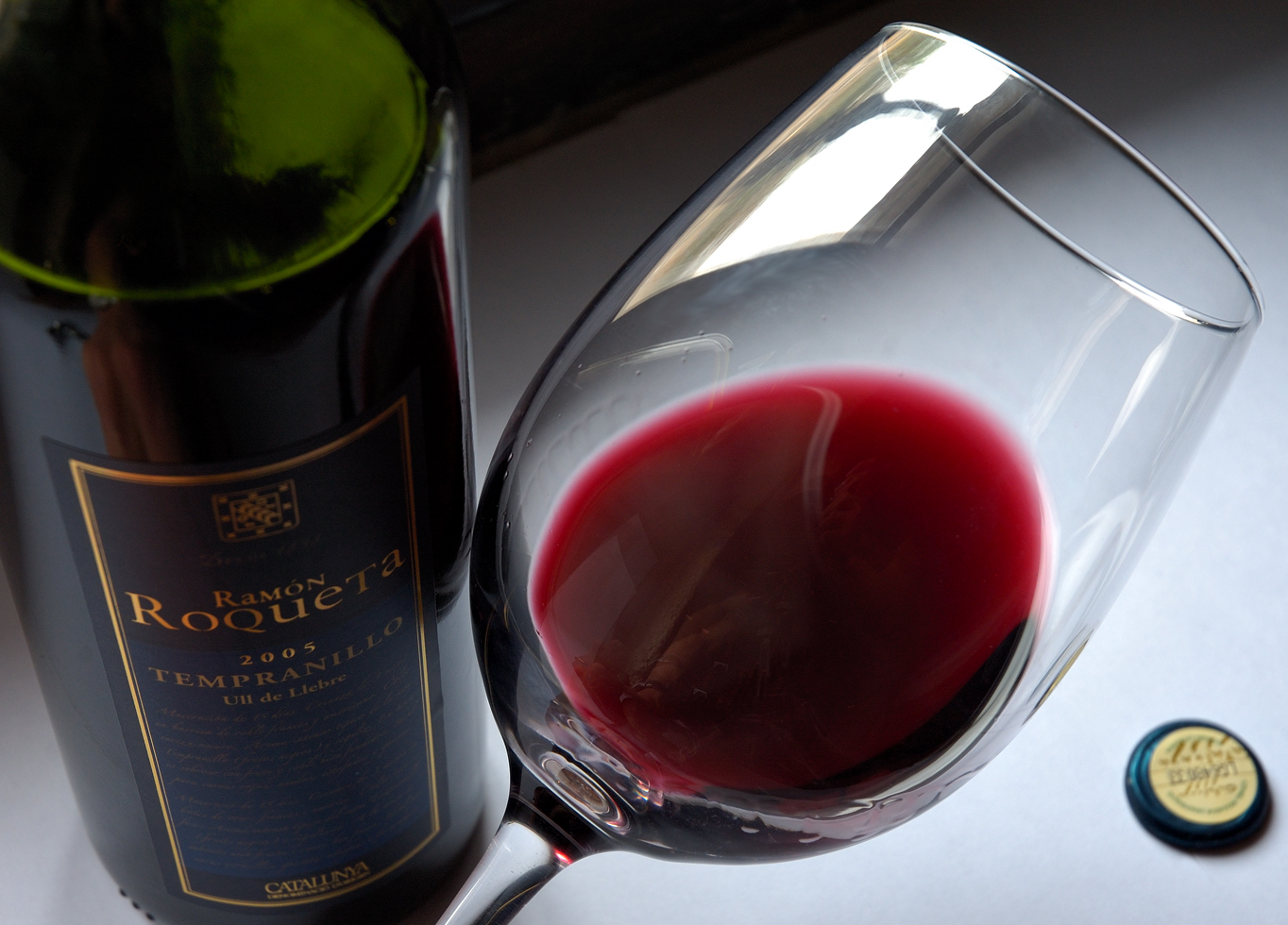
Tempranillo wine has a high pH level which means that there is a higher concentration of blue and colorless anthocyanin pigments in the wine. The resulting wine's coloring will have more blue hues than bright ruby red hues.

The color variation in the finished red wine is partly derived from the ionization of anthocyanin pigments caused by the acidity of the wine. In this case, the three types of anthocyanin pigments are red, blue and colorless with the concentration of those various pigments dictating the color of the wine. A wine with low pH (and such greater acidity) will have a higher occurrence of ionized anthocyanins which will increase the amount of bright red pigments. Wines with a higher pH will have a higher concentration of blue and colorless pigments. As the wine ages, anthocyanins will react with other acids and compounds in wines such as tannins, pyruvic acid and acetaldehyde which will change the color of the wine, causing it to develop more "brick red" hues. These molecules will link up to create polymers that eventually exceed their solubility and become sediment at the bottom of wine bottles. Pyranoanthocyanins are chemical compounds formed in red wines by yeast during fermentation processes or during controlled oxygenation processes during the aging of wine.

==== Tannins ====
Tannins refer to the diverse group of chemical compounds in wine that can affect the color, aging ability and texture of the wine. While tannins cannot be smelled or tasted, they can be perceived during wine tasting by the tactile sensation of astringency and sense of bitterness that they can leave in the mouth. This is due to the tendency of tannins to react with proteins, such as the ones found in saliva. The management of tannins in the winemaking process is a key component in the resulting quality.

In food and wine pairing, foods that are high in proteins (such as red meat) are often paired with tannic wines to minimize the astringency of tannins. However, many wine drinkers find the perception of tannins to be a positive trait, especially as it relates to mouthfeel.

Tannins are found in the skin, stems, and seeds of wine grapes but can also be introduced to the wine through the use of oak barrels and chips or with the addition of tannin powder. The natural tannins found in grapes are known as proanthocyanidins due to their ability to release red anthocyanin pigments when they are heated in an acidic solution. Grape extracts are mainly rich in monomers and small oligomers (mean degree of polymerization < 8). Grape seed extracts contain three monomers (catechin, epicatechin and epicatechin gallate) and procyanidin oligomers. Grape skin extracts contain four monomers (catechin, epicatechin, gallocatechin and epigallocatechin), as well as procyanidins and prodelphinidins oligomers. The tannins are formed by enzymes during metabolic processes of the grapevine. The amount of tannins found naturally in grapes varies depending on the variety with Cabernet Sauvignon, Nebbiolo, Syrah and Tannat being 4 of the most tannic grape varieties. The reaction of tannins and anthocyanins with the phenolic compound catechins creates another class of tannins known as pigmented tannins which influence the color of red wine. Commercial preparations of tannins, known as enological tannins, made from oak wood, grape seed and skin, plant gall, chestnut, quebracho, gambier and myrobalan fruits, can be added at different stages of the wine production to improve color durability. The tannins derived from oak influence are known as "hydrolysable tannins" being created from the ellagic and gallic acid found in the wood.

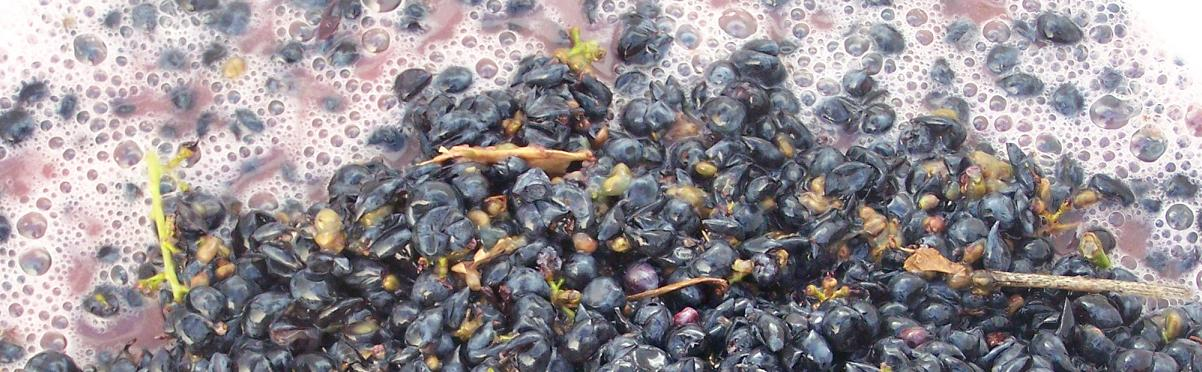
Fermenting with the stem, seeds and skin will increase the tannin content of the wine

In the vineyards, there is also a growing distinction being made between "ripe" and "unripe" tannins present in the grape. This "physiological ripeness", which is roughly determined by tasting the grapes off the vines, is being used along with sugar levels as a determination of when to harvest. The idea is that "riper" tannins will taste softer but still impart some of the texture components found favorable in wine. In winemaking, the amount of the time that the must spends in contact with the grape skins, stems and seeds will influence the amount of tannins that are present in the wine with wines subjected to longer maceration period having more tannin extract. Following harvest, stems are normally picked out and discarded prior to fermentation but some winemakers may intentionally leave in a few stems for varieties low in tannins (like Pinot noir) in order to increase the tannic extract in the wine. If there is an excess in the amount of tannins in the wine, winemakers can use various fining agents like albumin, casein and gelatin that can bind to tannins molecule and precipitate them out as sediments. As a wine ages, tannins will form long polymerized chains which come across to a taster as "softer" and less tannic. This process can be accelerated by exposing the wine to oxygen, which oxidize tannins to quinone-like compounds that are polymerization-prone. The winemaking technique of micro-oxygenation and decanting wine use oxygen to partially mimic the effect of aging on tannins.

A study in wine production and consumption has shown that tannins, in the form of proanthocyanidins, have a beneficial effect on vascular health. The study showed that tannins suppressed production of the peptide responsible for hardening arteries. To support their findings, the study also points out that wines from the regions of southwest France and Sardinia are particularly rich in proanthocyanidins, and that these regions also produce populations with longer life spans.

Reactions of tannins with the phenolic compound anthocyanidins creates another class of tannins known as pigmented tannins which influences the color of red wine.

===== Addition of enological tannins =====
Commercial preparations of tannins, known as enological tannins, made from oak wood, grape seed and skin, plant gall, chestnut, quebracho, gambier and myrobalan fruits, can be added at different stages of the wine production to improve color durability.

===== Effects of tannins on the drinkability and aging potential of wine =====
Tannins are a natural preservative in wine. Un-aged wines with high tannin content can be less palatable than wines with a lower level of tannins. Tannins can be described as leaving a dry and puckered feeling with a "furriness" in the mouth that can be compared to a stewed tea, which is also very tannic. This effect is particularly profound when drinking tannic wines without the benefit of food.

Many wine lovers see natural tannins (found particularly in varietals such as Cabernet Sauvignon and often accentuated by heavy oak barrel aging) as a sign of potential longevity and ageability. Tannins impart a mouth-puckering astringency when the wine is young but "resolve" (through a chemical process called polymerization) into delicious and complex elements of "bottle bouquet" when the wine is cellared under appropriate temperature conditions, preferably in the range of a constant 55 to 60 °F (13 to 16 °C). Such wines mellow and improve with age with the tannic "backbone" helping the wine survive for as long as 40 years or more. In many regions (such as in Bordeaux), tannic grapes such as Cabernet Sauvignon are blended with lower-tannin grapes such as Merlot or Cabernet Franc, diluting the tannic characteristics. White wines and wines that are vinified to be drunk young (for examples, see nouveau wines) typically have lower tannin levels.

=== Other flavonoids ===
Flavan-3-ols (catechins) are flavonoids that contribute to the construction of various tannins and contribute to the perception of bitterness in wine. They are found in highest concentrations in grape seeds but are also in the skin and stems. Catechins play a role in the microbial defense of the grape berry, being produced in higher concentrations by the grape vines when it is being attacked by grape diseases such as downy mildew. Because of that grape vines in cool, damp climates produce catechins at high levels than vines in dry, hot climates. Together with anthocyanins and tannins they increase the stability of a wines color-meaning that a wine will be able to maintain its coloring for a longer period of time. The amount of catechins present varies among grape varieties with varietals like Pinot noir having high concentrations while Merlot and especially Syrah have very low levels. As an antioxidant, there are some studies into the health benefits of moderate consumption of wines high in catechins.

In red grapes, the main flavonol is on average quercetin, followed by myricetin, kaempferol, laricitrin, isorhamnetin, and syringetin. In white grapes, the main flavonol is quercetin, followed by kaempferol and isorhamnetin. The delphinidin-like flavonols myricetin, laricitrin, and syringetin are missing in all white varieties, indicating that the enzyme flavonoid 3',5'-hydroxylase is not expressed in white grape varieties.

Myricetin, laricitrin and syringetin, flavonols which are present in red grape varieties only, can be found in red wine.

=== Non-flavonoids ===
==== Hydroxycinnamic acids ====
Hydroxycinnamic acids are the most important group of nonflavonoid phenols in wine. The four most abundant ones are the tartaric acid esters trans-caftaric, cis- and trans-coutaric, and trans-fertaric acids. In wine they are present also in the free form (trans-caffeic, trans-p-coumaric, and trans-ferulic acids).

==== Stilbenoids ====
V. vinifera also produces stilbenoids.

Resveratrol is found in highest concentration in the skins of wine grapes. The accumulation in ripe berries of different concentrations of both bound and free resveratrols depends on the maturity level and is highly variable according to the genotype. Both red and white wine grape varieties contain resveratrol, but more frequent skin contact and maceration leads to red wines normally having ten times more resveratrol than white wines. Resveratrol produced by grape vines provides defense against microbes, and production can be further artificially stimulated by ultraviolet radiation. Grapevines in cool, damp regions with higher risk of grape diseases, such as Bordeaux and Burgundy, tend to produce grapes with higher levels of resveratrol than warmer, drier wine regions such as California and Australia. Different grape varieties tend to have differing levels, with Muscadines and the Pinot family having high levels while the Cabernet family has lower levels of resveratrol. In the late 20th century interest in the possible health benefits of resveratrol in wine was spurred by discussion of the French paradox involving the health of wine drinkers in France.

Piceatannol is also present in grape from where it can be extracted and found in red wine.

==== Phenolic acids ====
Vanillin is a phenolic aldehyde most commonly associated with the vanilla notes in wines that have been aged in oak. Trace amounts of vanillin are found naturally in grapes, but they are most prominent in the lignin structure of oak barrels. Newer barrels will impart more vanillin, with the concentration present decreasing with each subsequent usage.

== Phenols from oak ageing ==
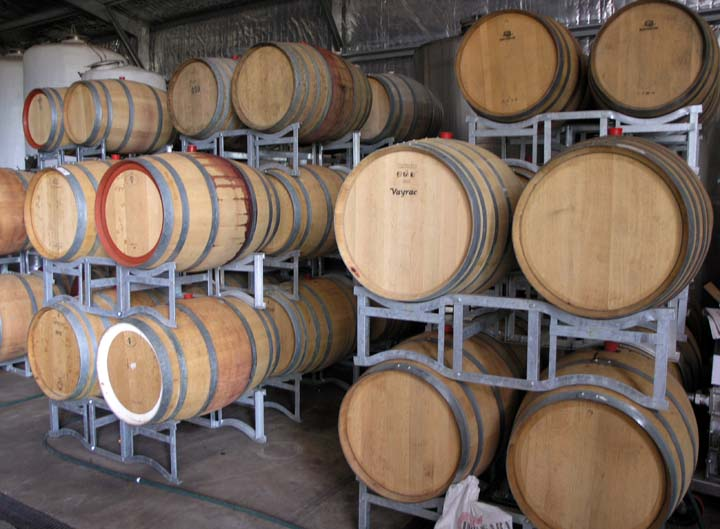
Phenolic compounds like tannins and vanillin can be extracted from aging in oak wine barrels

Oak barrel will add compounds such as vanillin and hydrolysable tannins (ellagitannins). The hydrolyzable tannins present in oak are derived from lignin structures in the wood. They help protect the wine from oxidation and reduction.

4-Ethylphenol and 4-ethylguaiacol are produced during ageing of red wine in oak barrels that are infected by brettanomyces.

== Natural phenols and polyphenols from cork stoppers ==
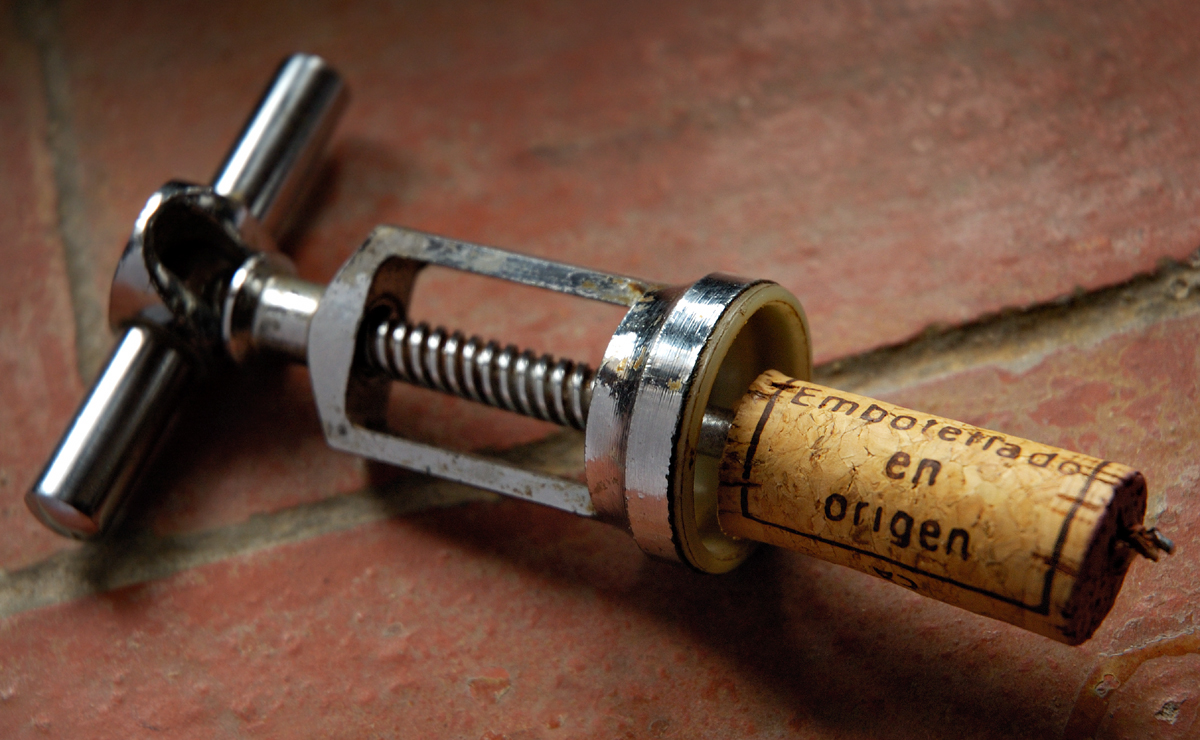
Extracted cork inscribed with "Bottled at origin" in Spanish

Low molecular weight polyphenols, as well as ellagitannins, are susceptible to be extracted from cork stoppers into the wine. The identified polyphenols are gallic, protocatechuic, vanillic, caffeic, ferulic, and ellagic acids; protocatechuic, vanillic, coniferyl, and sinapic aldehydes; the coumarins aesculetin and scopoletin; the ellagitannins are roburins A and E, grandinin, vescalagin and castalagin.

Guaiacol is one of the molecules responsible for the cork taint wine fault.

== Phenolic content in relation with wine making techniques ==
=== Extraction levels in relation with grape pressing techniques ===
Flash release is a technique used in wine pressing. The technique allows for a better extraction of phenolic compounds.

=== Microoxygeneation ===
The exposure of wine to oxygen in limited quantities affects phenolic content.

== Phenolic compounds found in wine ==
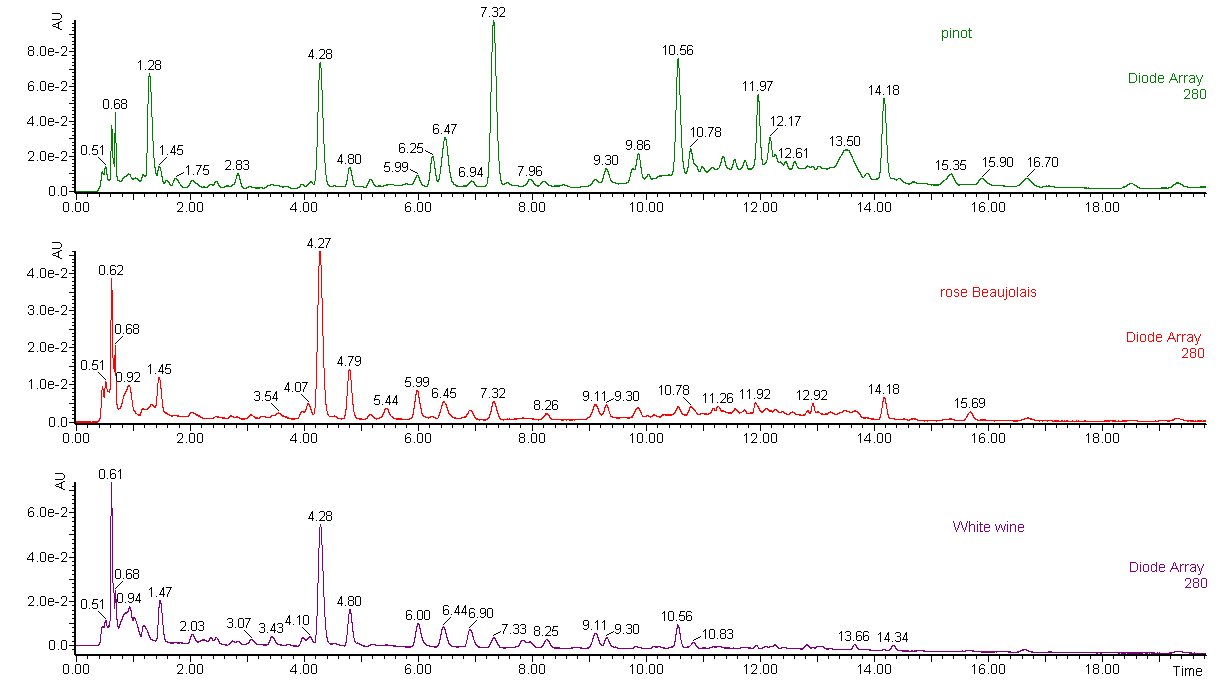
LC chromatograms at 280 nm of a pinot red wine (top), a Beaujolais rosé (middle) and a white wine (bottom). The picture shows peaks corresponding to the different phenolic compounds. The hump between 9 and 15 minutes corresponds to the presence of tannins, mostly present in the red wine.

Depending on the methods of production, wine type, grape varieties, ageing processes, the following phenolics can be found in wine. The list, sorted in alphabetical order of common names, is not exhaustive.

- Acutissimin A
- Aesculetin
- Anthocyanidin-caftaric acid adducts
- Astilbin
- Astringin
- B type proanthocyanidin dimers
- B type proanthocyanidin trimers
- Caffeic acid
- Caftaric acid
- Castalagin
- Castavinol C1
- Castavinol C2
- Castavinol C3
- Castavinol C4
- Catechin
- Catechin-(4,8)-malvidin-3-O-glucoside
- Compound NJ2
- Coniferyl aldehyde
- Coumaric acid
- Coutaric acid
- Cyanidin
- Cyanin (Cyanidin-3,5-O-diglucoside)
- Cyanidin 3O-glucoside
- Cyanidin acetyl 3O glucoside
- Cyanidin coumaroyl 3O glucoside
- Cyanidin-3-O-glucoside-pyruvic acid
- Cyanidin-3-O-acetylglucoside-pyruvic acid
- Cyanidin-coumaroylglucoside-pyruvic acid
- Delphinidin
- Delphinidin 3O glucoside
- Delphinidin acetyl-3O glucoside
- Delphinidin coumaroyl 3O glucoside
- Delphinidin-3-O-glucoside-pyruvic acid
- Delphinidin-3-O-acetylglucoside-pyruvic acid
- Delphinidin-3-O-coumaroylglucoside-pyruvic acid
- Delphinidin-3-O-glucoside-4-vinylcatechol
- Delphinidin-3-O-acetylglucoside-4-vinylcatechol
- Delphinidin-3-O-coumaroylglucoside-4-vinylcatechol
- Delphinidin-3-O-glucoside-4-vinylphenol
- Delphinidin-3-O-acetylglucoside-4-vinylphenol
- Delphinidin-3-O-coumaroylglucoside-4-vinylphenol
- Delphinidin-3-O-glucoside-4-vinylguaiacol
- Delphinidin-3-O-glucoside-4-vinyl(epi)catechin
- Delphinidin-3-O-acetylglucoside-4-vinyl(epi)catechin
- Delta-viniferin
- Dihydro-resveratrol
- Ellagic acid
- Engeletin
- Epicatechin gallate
- Epigallocatechin
- Epsilon-viniferin
- Ethyl caffeate
- Ethyl gallate
- Ethyl protocatechuate
- 4-Ethylguaiacol
- 4-Ethylphenol
- Fertaric acid
- Ferulic acid
- Gallic acid
- Gentisic acid
- Grandinin
- Grape reaction product (GRP)
- Guaiacol
- Hopeaphenol
- p-Hydroxybenzoic acid
- Isorhamnetol 3-glucoside
- Kaempferol
- Kaempferol glucoside (astragalin)
- Kaempferol glucuronide
- Malvidin
- Malvidin 3O-glucoside (oenin)
- Malvidin acetyl-3O-glucoside
- Malvidin cafeoyl-3O-glucoside
- Malvidin coumaroyl-3Oglucoside
- Malvidin glucoside-ethyl-catechin
- Malvidin-3-O-glucoside-pyruvic acid
- Malvidin-3-O-acetylglucoside-pyruvic acid
- Malvidin-3-O-coumaroylglucoside-pyruvic acid
- Malvidin-3-O-glucoside-acetaldehyde
- Malvidin-3-O-acetylglucoside-acetaldehyde
- Malvidin-3-O-coumaroylglucoside-acetaldehyde
- Malvidin-3-O-glucoside-4-vinylcatechol
- Malvidin-3-O-acetylglucoside-4-vinylcatechol
- Malvidin-3-O-coumaroylglucoside-4-vinylcatechol
- Malvidin-3-O-glucoside-4-vinylphenol
- Malvidin-3-O-acetylglucoside-4-vinylphenol
- Malvidin-3-O-coumaroylglucoside-4-vinylphenol
- Malvidin-3-O-caffeoylglucoside-4-vinylphenol
- Malvidin-3-O-glucoside-4-vinylguaiacol
- Malvidin-3-O-acetylglucoside-4-vinylguaiacol
- Malvidin-3-O-coumaroylglucoside-vinylguaiacol
- Malvidin-3-O-glucoside-4-vinyl(epi)catechin
- Malvidin-3-O-acetylglucoside-4-vinyl(epi)catechin
- Malvidin-3-O-coumaroylglucoside-4-vinyl(epi)catechin
- Methyl gallate
- Myricetol
- Myricetol 3-glucoside
- Myricetol 3-glucuronide
- Oxovitisin A
- Pallidol
- Pelargonin (Pelargonidin 3,5-O-diglucoside)
- Peonidin 3O-glucoside
- Peonidin acetyl-3O-glucoside
- Peonidin-3-(6-p-caffeoyl)-glucoside
- Peonidin coumaroyl 3O-glucoside
- Peonidin-3-O-glucoside-pyruvic acid
- Peonidin-3-O-acetylglucoside-pyruvic acid
- Peonidin-3-O-coumaroylglucoside-pyruvic acid
- Peonidin-3-O-glucoside-4-vinylcatechol
- Peonidin-3-O-acetylglucoside-4-vinylcatechol
- Peonidin-3-O-coumaroylglucoside-4-vinylcatechol
- Peonidin-3-O-glucoside-4-vinylphenol
- Peonidin-3-O-acetylglucoside-4-vinylphenol
- Peonidin-3-O-coumaroylglucoside-4-vinylphenol
- Peonidin-3-O-glucoside-4-vinylguaiacol
- Peonidin-3-O-glucoside-4-vinyl(epi)catechin
- Peonidin-3-O-acetylglucoside-4-vinyl(epi)catechin
- Petunidin
- Petunidin 3O glucoside
- Petunidin acetyl-3O-glucoside
- Petunidin coumaroyl-3O glucoside
- Petunidin-3-O-glucoside-pyruvic acid
- Petunidin-3-O-acetylglucoside-pyruvic acid
- Petunidin-3-O-coumaroylglucoside-pyruvic acid
- Petunidin-3-O-glucoside-4-vinylcatechol
- Petunidin-3-O-acetylglucoside-4-vinylcatechol
- Petunidin-3-O-coumaroylglucoside-4-vinylcatechol
- Petunidin-3-O-glucoside-4-vinylphenol
- Petunidin-3-O-acetylglucoside-4-vinylphenol
- Petunidin-3-O-coumaroylglucoside-4-vinylphenol
- Petunidin-3-O-glucoside-4-vinylguaiacol
- Petunidin-3-O-glucoside-4-vinyl(epi)catechin
- Petunidin-3-O-acetylglucoside-4-vinyl(epi)catechin
- Phloroglucinol carboxylic acid
- Piceatannol
- Piceids
- Pinotin A
- Oligomeric procyanidins :
  - Procyanidin B1
  - Procyanidin B2
  - Procyanidin B3
  - Procyanidin B4
  - B1-3-O-gallate
  - B2-3-O-gallate
  - B2-3'-O-gallate
  - procyanidin C1 (epicatechin-(4β→8)-epicatechin-(4β→8)-epicatechin)
  - Procyanidin C2 (catechin-(4α→8)-catechin-(4α→8)-catechin)
  - Procyanidin T2 (trimer)
- Protocatechuic acid
- Protocatechuic aldehyde
- Quercetin
- Quercetol glucoside
- Quercetol glucuronide
- Resveratrol
- Roburin A
- Roburin E
- Scopoletin
- Sinapic aldehyde
- Sinapinic acid
- Syringic acid
- Tyrosol
- Vanillic acid
- Vanillin
- Vescalagin
- 4-Vinylphenol
- Vitisin A
- Vitisin B
- Vinylpyranomalvidin-3O-glucoside-procyanidin dimer
- VinylpyranoMv-3-coumaroylglucoside-procyanidin dimer
- Vinylpyranomalvidin-3O-glucoside-catechin
- Vinylpyranomalvidin-3O-coumaroylglucoside-catechin
- Vinylpyranomalvidin-3O-phenol
- Vinylpyranopetunidin-3O-glucoside-catechin
- Vinylpyranopeonidin-3O-glucoside-catechin
- Vinylpyranomalvidin-3O-acetylglucoside-catechin

== Effects ==
Polyphenol compounds may interact with volatiles and contribute to the aromas in wine. Although wine polyphenols are speculated to provide antioxidant or other benefits, there is little evidence that wine polyphenols actually have any effect in humans. Limited preliminary research indicates that wine polyphenols may decrease platelet aggregation, enhance fibrinolysis, and increase HDL cholesterol, but high-quality clinical trials have not confirmed such effects, as of 2017.

== See also ==
- Aging of wine
- Clarification and stabilization of wine
- Grape seed extract
- Phenolic content in tea
- Wine chemistry
- Wine preservatives
