= Aralu =

Aralu may refer to:

- Oroxylum indicum (Sanskrit: अरलु, romanized: aralu), a flowering plant commonly called midnight horror or Indian trumpet flower used in traditional medicine
- Terminalia chebula, a tree native to south or southeast Asia commonly known as black- or chebulic myrobalan

== See also ==
- Myrobalan
