= Wine =

Alcoholic drink made from grapes

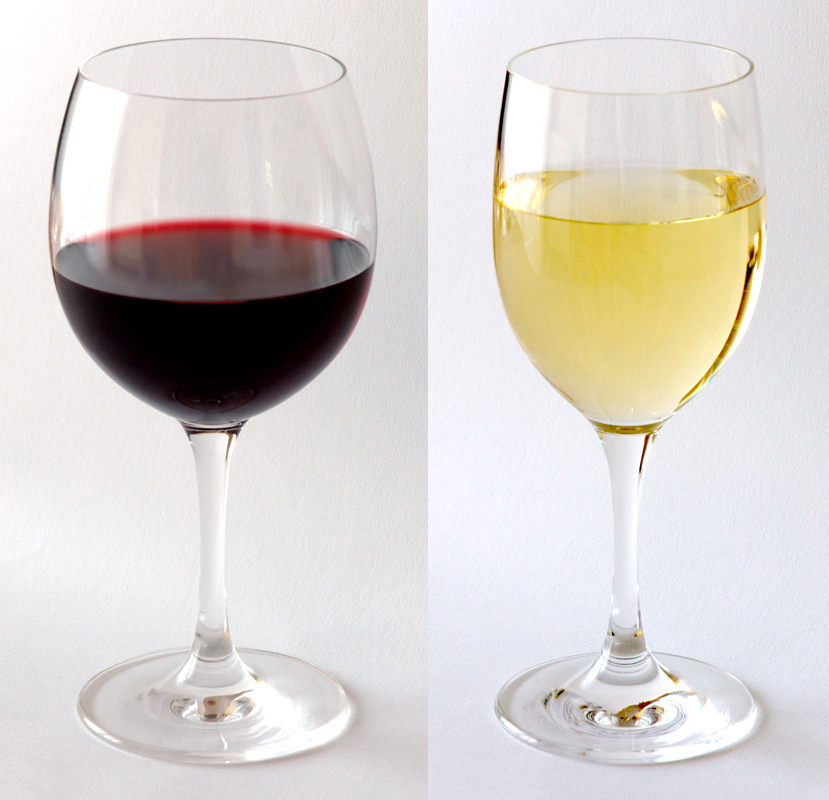
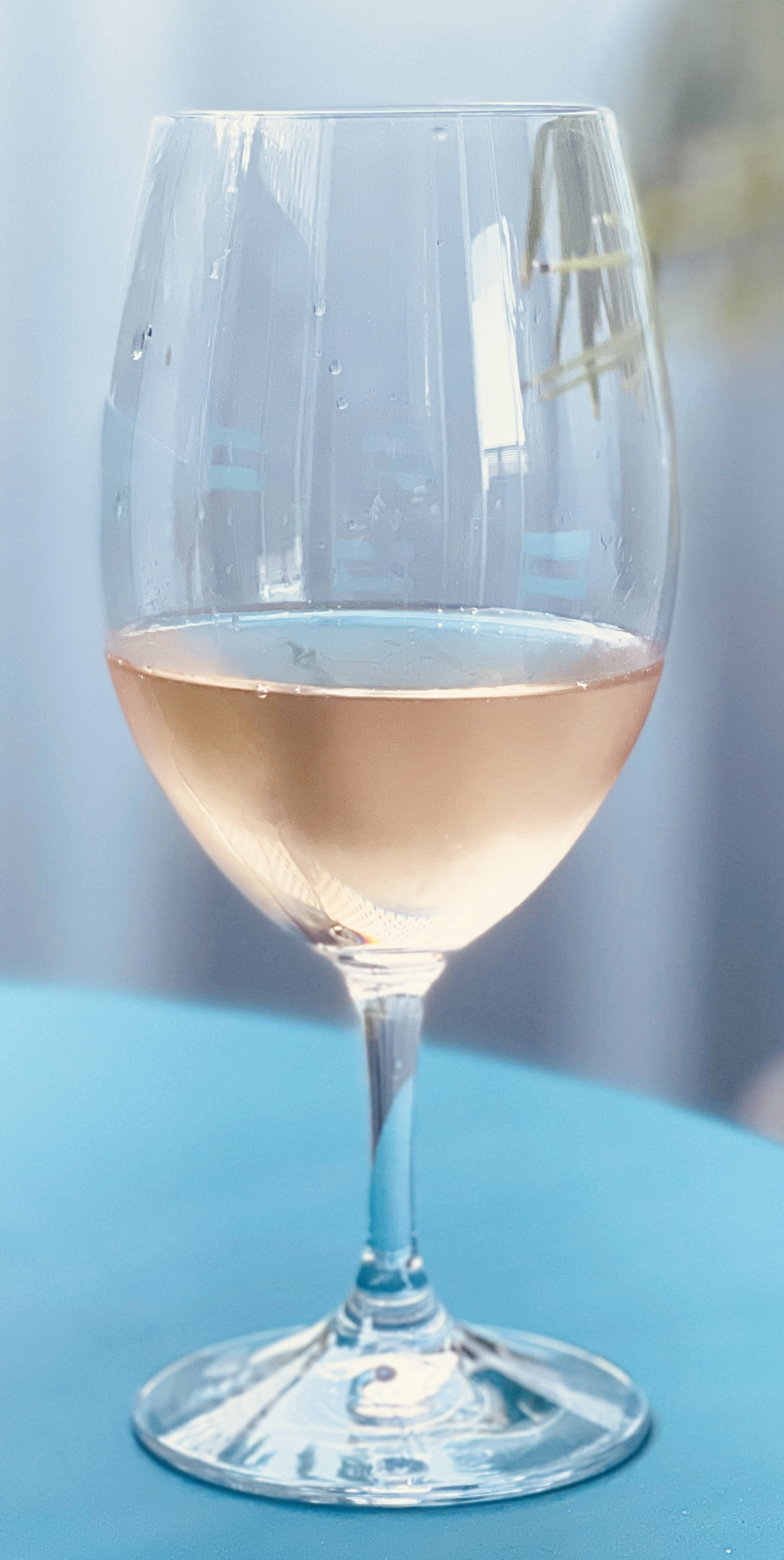
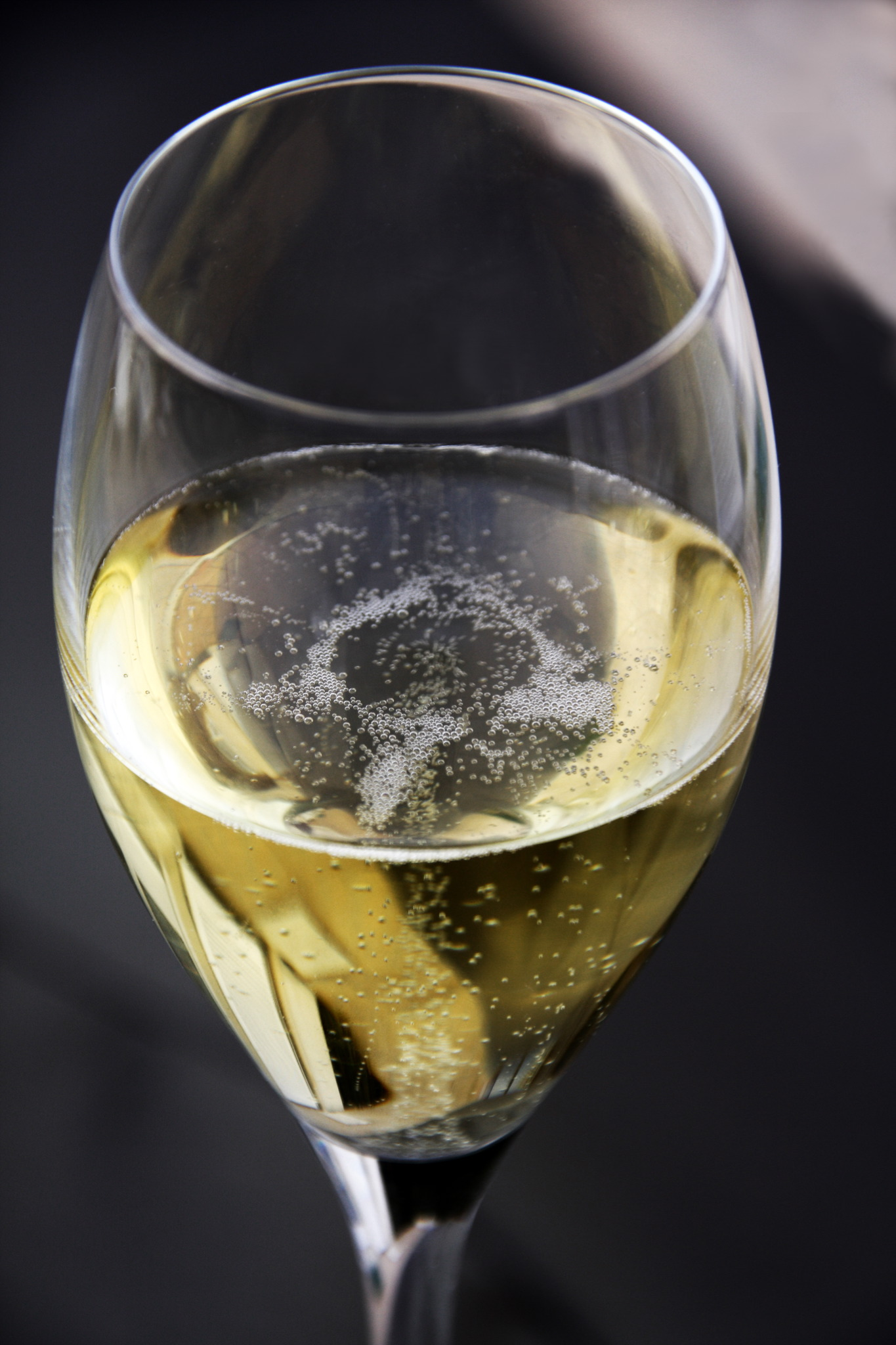
- Red and white wine Rosé wine Sparkling wine
- Type: Alcoholic beverage
- Alcohol by volume: Typically 12.5–14.5%
- Ingredients: Fermented grape juice
- Variants: Red; White; Rosé; Orange; Sparkling; Dessert; Fortified

Wine is an alcoholic drink made from fermented grape juice. (Note: The unqualified term "wine" typically refers to grape wine; wine can be made from a variety of fruit crops, collectively referred to as fruit wine.) It is produced and consumed in many regions around the world, in a wide variety of styles which are influenced by different varieties of grapes, growing environments, viticulture methods, and production techniques.

Wine has been produced for thousands of years, the earliest evidence dating from c. 6000 BCE in present-day Georgia. Its popularity spread around the Mediterranean during Classical antiquity, and was sustained in Western Europe by winemaking monks and a secular trade for general drinking. New World wine was established by settler colonies from the 16th century onwards, and the wine trade increased dramatically up to the latter half of the 19th century, when European vineyards were largely destroyed by the invasive pest phylloxera. After the Second World War, winemakers focused on quality and marketing to cater for a more discerning audience, and wine remains a popular drink in much of the world.

Wine has played an important role in religion since antiquity, and has featured prominently in the arts for centuries. It is drunk on its own and paired with food, often in social settings such as wine bars and restaurants. It is often tasted and assessed, with drinkers using a wide range of descriptors to communicate a wine's characteristics. Wine is also collected and stored, as an investment or to improve with age. Its alcohol content makes wine generally unhealthy to consume, although it may have cardioprotective benefits.

== History ==
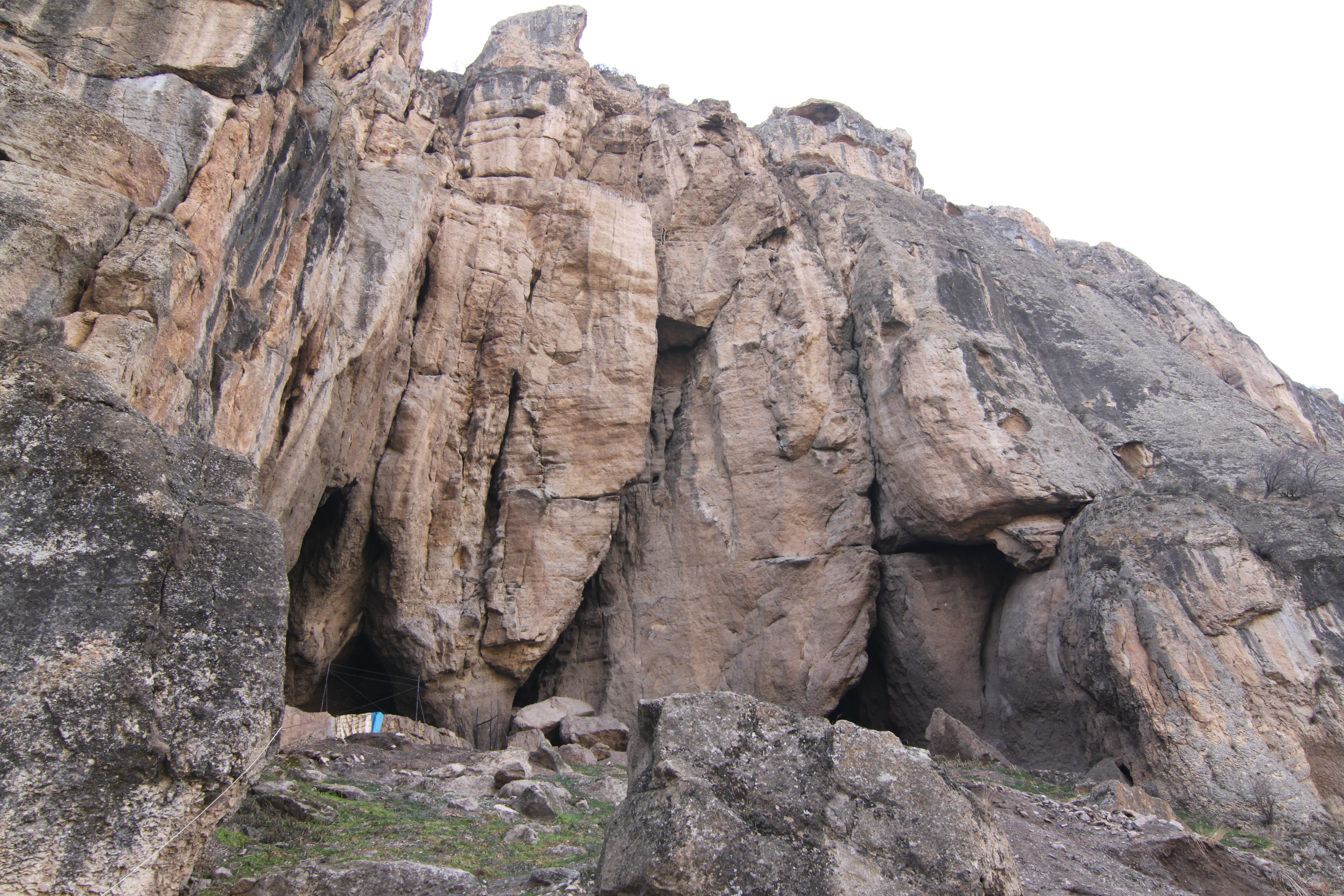
The Areni-1 cave in Armenia is home to the world's oldest known winery.

The earliest known traces of wine were found near Tbilisi, Georgia (c. 6000 BCE). The earliest known winery, from c. 4100 BCE, is the Areni-1 winery in Armenia. The subsequent spread of wine culture around the Mediterranean was probably due to the influence of the Phoenicians (from c. 1000 BCE) and Greeks (from c. 600 BCE). The Phoenicians exported the wines of Byblos, which were known for their quality into Roman times. Industrialized production of wine in ancient Greece spread across the Italian peninsula and to southern Gaul. The ancient Romans further increased the scale of wine production and trade networks, especially in Gaul around the time of the Gallic Wars.

In medieval Europe, monks grew grapes and made wine for the Eucharist. Monasteries expanded their land holdings over time and established vineyards in many of today's most successful wine regions. Bordeaux was a notable exception, being a purely commercial enterprise serving the Duchy of Aquitaine and by association Britain between the 12th and 15th centuries.

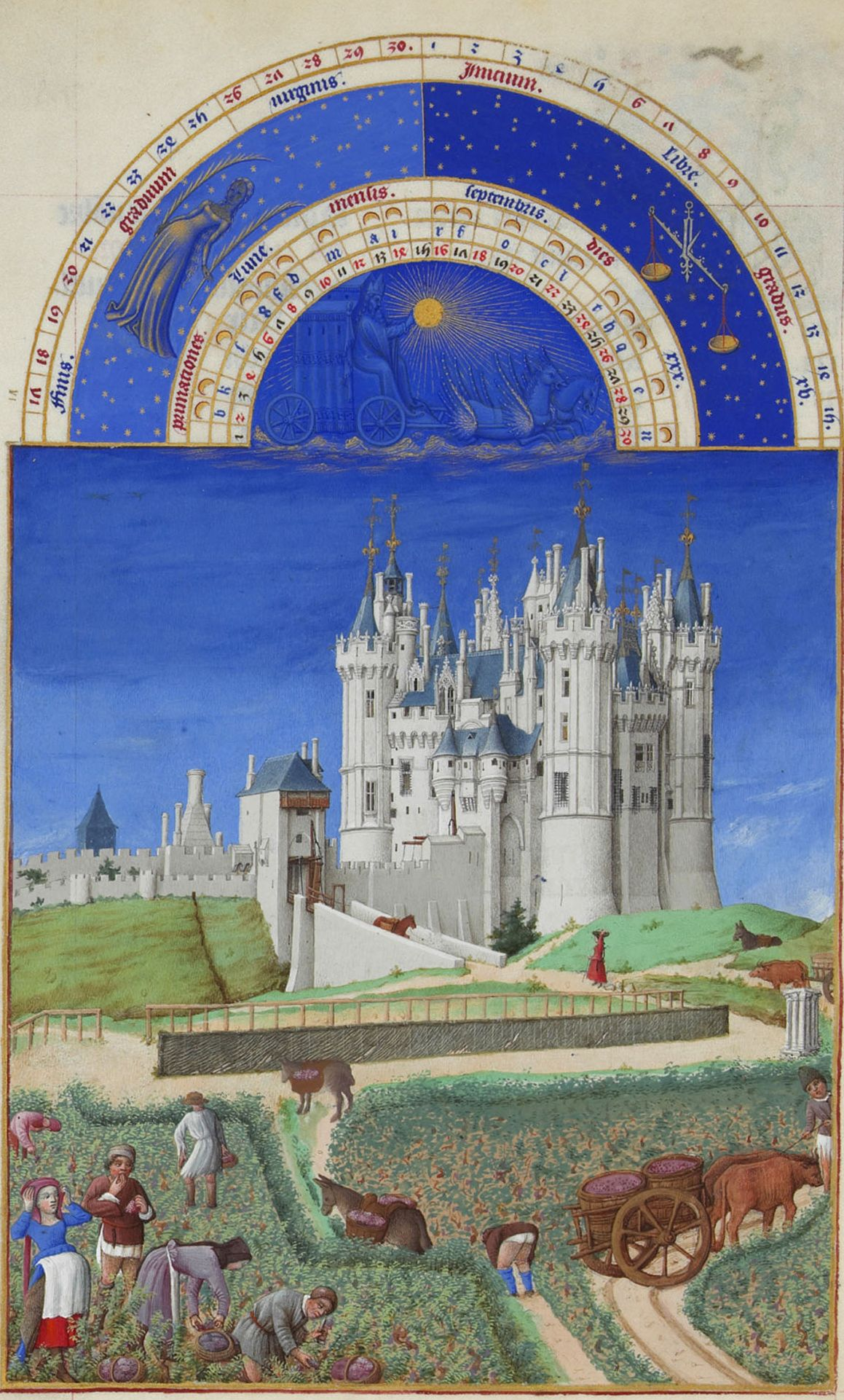
Grape harvesting at Château de Saumur, depicted in Les Très Riches Heures du duc de Berry (c. 1416)

European wine grape traditions were incorporated into New World wine, with colonists planting vineyards in order to celebrate the Eucharist. Vineyards were established in Mexico by 1530, Peru by the 1550s and Chile shortly afterwards. The European settlement of South Africa and subsequent trade involving the Dutch East India Company led to the planting of vines in 1655. Jesuit Missionaries managed to grow vines in California in the 1670s, and plantings were later established in Los Angeles in the 1820s and Napa and Sonoma in the 1850s. Arthur Phillip introduced vines to Australia in 1788, and viticulture was widely practiced by the 1850s. The Australian missionary Samuel Marsden introduced vines to New Zealand in 1819.

The Great French Wine Blight began in the latter half of the 19th century, caused by an infestation of the aphid phylloxera brought over from America, whose louse stage feeds on vine roots and eventually kills the plant. Almost every vine in Europe needed to be replaced, by necessity grafted onto American rootstock which is naturally resistant to the pest. This practice continues to this day, with the exception of a small number of phylloxera-free wine regions such as South Australia.

The subsequent decades saw further issues impact the wine trade, with the rise of prohibitionism, political upheaval and two world wars, and economic depression and protectionism. The co-operative movement gained traction with winemakers during the interwar period, and the Institut national de l'origine et de la qualité was established in 1947 to oversee the administration of France's appellation laws, the first to create comprehensive restrictions on grape varieties, maximum yields, alcoholic strength and vinification techniques. After the Second World War, the wine market improved; All major producing countries adopted appellation laws, which increased consumer confidence, and winemakers focused on quality and marketing as consumers became more discerning and wealthy. New World wines, previously dominated by a few large producers, began to fill a niche in the market, with small producers meeting the demand for high quality small-batch artisanal wines. A consumer culture has emerged, supporting wine-related publications, wine tourism, paraphernalia such as preservation devices and storage solutions, and educational courses.

== Production ==
Wine production

=== Styles ===
The term "wine" typically refers to a drink made from fermented grape juice; drinks from other fruits are generically called fruit wine. It does not include drinks made from starches (e.g. beer), honey (mead), apples (cider), pears (perry), or a liquid which is subsequently distilled to make liquor. Most fruits other than grapes lack sufficient fermentable sugars, are overly acidic, and do not have enough nutrients for yeast, necessitating winemaker intervention. They do not typically improve with age, and last less than a year after bottling. Fruit wines are particularly popular in North America and Scandinavia.

The sweetness of wine is determined by the amount of residual sugar left after fermentation. Dessert wines have a high level of residual sugar remaining after fermentation. There are several ways of making sweet wines, such as the use of grapes affected by noble rot (e.g. Sauternes), exposed to freezing temperatures (e.g. icewine), or dried (e.g. Vin Santo).

Sparkling wines are effervescent, and can be any color, although they are usually white. They generally undergo secondary fermentation to create carbon dioxide, which remains dissolved in the wine under pressure in a sealed container. Two common methods of accomplishing this are the traditional method, used for Cava, Champagne, and more expensive sparkling wines, and the Charmat method, used for Prosecco, Asti, and less expensive wines. A hybrid "transfer method" is also used, yielding intermediate results, and simple addition of carbon dioxide is used in the cheapest of wines.

The type of grape used and the amount of skin contact while the juice is being extracted determines the color of the wine.

Colors of wine
	Long contact with grape skins	Short contact with grape skins
Red grapes	Red wine, made from dark-colored red grape varieties, and the actual color of the wine can range from dark pink to almost black. The juice from red grapes is actually pale gray; (Note: An exception to this is the family of teinturier varieties, which actually have red flesh.) the color of red wine and some of its flavor (notably tannins) comes from phenolics in the skin, seeds and stem fragments of the grape, extracted by allowing the grapes to soak in the juice.	Rosé wine, which gains color from red grape skins, but not enough to qualify it as a red wine. The color can range from a very pale pink to pale red. There are two primary ways to produce rosé wine. The preferred technique is allowing a short period of maceration after crushing red grapes, which extracts a certain amount of color. The juice is then fermented like a white wine. An alternative is blending a small amount of finished red wine into finished white wine. (Note: This practise is not allowed in most controlled wine regions, although Champagne is a notable exception.)
White grapes	Orange wine, sometimes called amber wine, is made with white grapes but with the skins allowed to macerate during and beyond fermentation, similar to red wine production. This results in their darker color compared to white wines, and produces a deliberately astringent result.	White wine, typically made from white grape varieties (those with yellow or green skins), and range from practically colorless to golden. (Note: Red grapes may be used to make a white wine if the winemaker separates the skins from the juice quickly after pressing to minimize skin contact, and white champagne commonly uses red grapes in this way.) When skin contact is used, to improve the flavor or to increase the body or aging potential, it is usually limited to between four and 24 hours; any longer leads to bitterness.

=== Viticulture ===
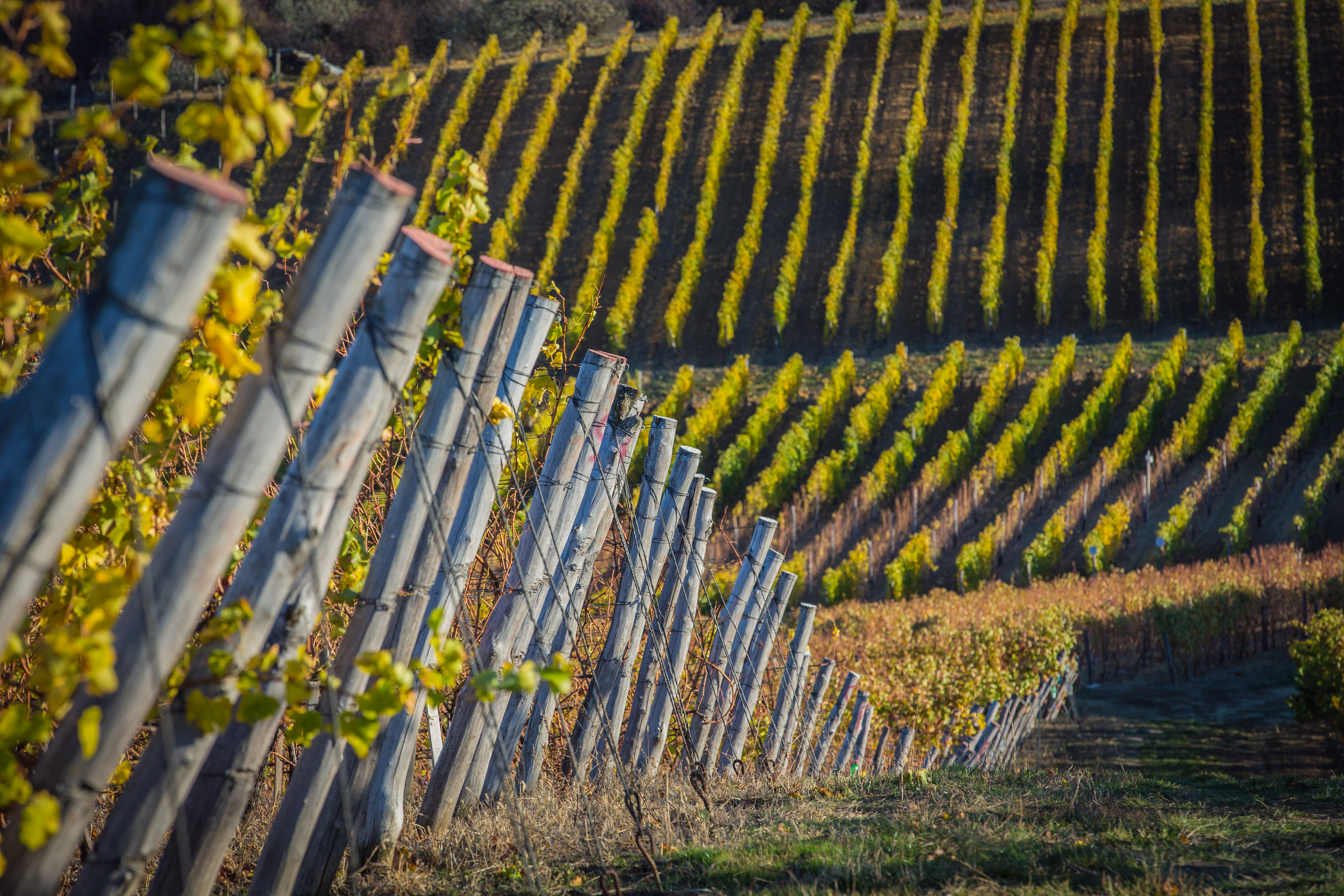
Vineyard in Moldova.

Wine is usually made from one or more varieties of the European species Vitis vinifera, such as Chardonnay and Cabernet Sauvignon. Most Vitis vinifera vines have been grafted onto North American species' rootstock, a common practice due to their resistance to phylloxera, a root louse that eventually kills the vine.

In the context of wine production, terroir is a concept that encompasses the growing environment of the vine, including elevation and slope of the vineyard, type and chemistry of soil, and climatic and seasonal conditions. The range of possible combinations of these factors can result in great differences in the characteristics and quality of the resultant wine.

Wine grapes grow mainly between 30 and 50 degrees latitude north and south of the equator, although the effects of climate change and advances in viticulture are increasing the area under vine elsewhere. The world's southernmost vineyard is in Sarmiento, Argentina, near the 46th parallel south. The northernmost wine region is the Okanagan Valley in British Columbia, Canada, which reaches up to the 50th parallel north.

=== Vinification ===
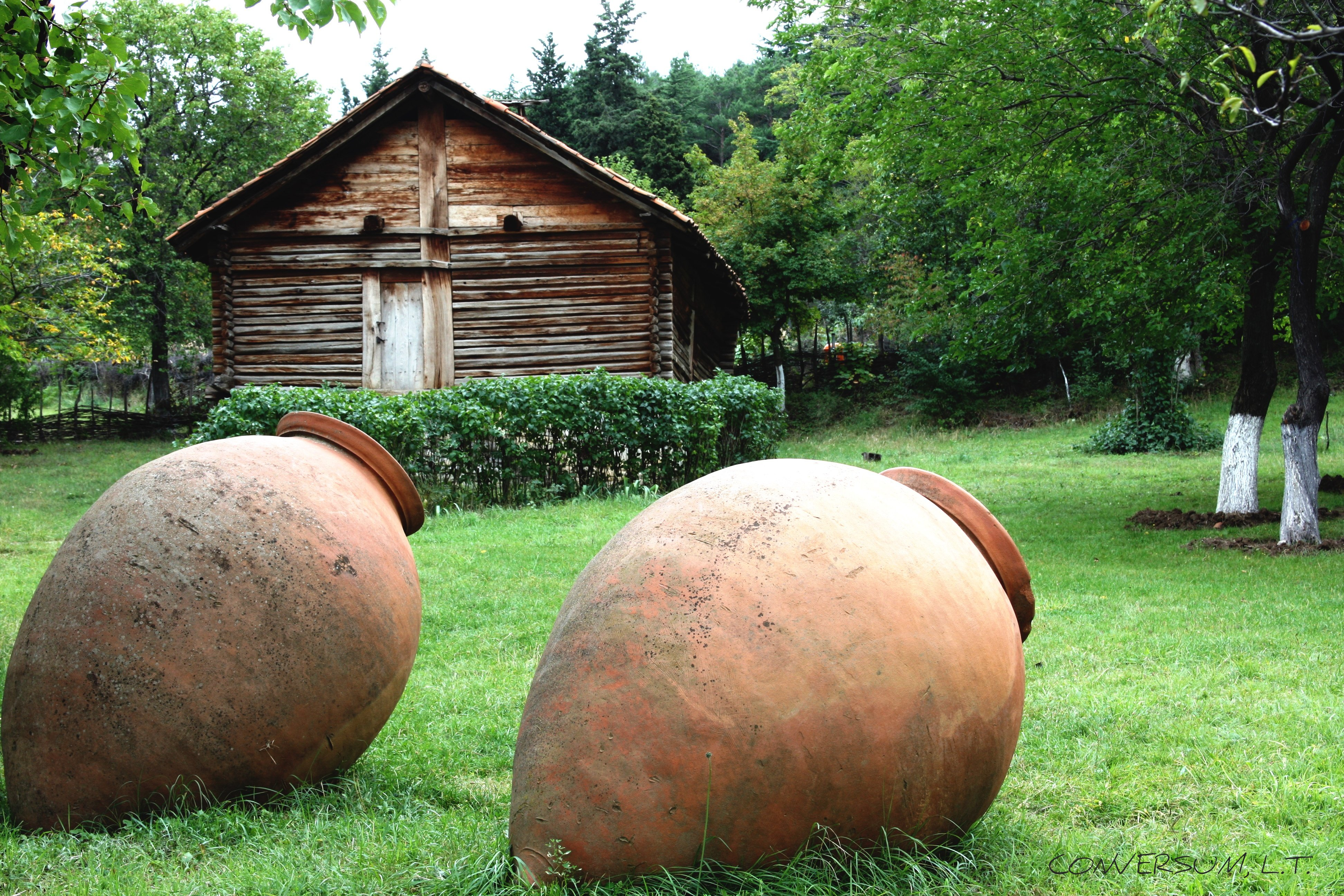
Kvevris, traditional Georgian wine-making vessels made of clay.

There are a number of different ways of making wine in a modern winery, each decision affecting the final outcome. The first step is harvesting the grapes, the timing of which depends on sugar and acid levels, any diseases affecting the crop, and the weather, among other factors. Grapes are harvested by hand or machine, sorted to select those of sufficient quality, typically destemmed, and then crushed to release the juice. The liquid may macerate for a few hours before being pressed and clarified.

The liquid is then transferred to a container for fermentation, which is typically made of stainless steel, wood or concrete, and either open or closed. Yeast is naturally present on grape skins, but most producers choose to use a specific strain for their predictable behaviour, allowing them to control the flavors produced. The yeast consumes the sugars and converts them into alcohol, heat, and carbon dioxide. For red wines, winemakers may choose to encourage the extraction of tannins and flavor from the grape skins by agitating the mixture. If permitted by law, the winemaker may include additives such as sugar, to increase the alcohol content (chaptalization), or adjust the acid levels. Some wines undergo a secondary, malolactic fermentation, in which the harsher malic acid is converted into lactic acid by bacteria. Finally the wine may be filtered to remove microbes and yeast, and sulfites may be added as a preservative.

=== Containers ===
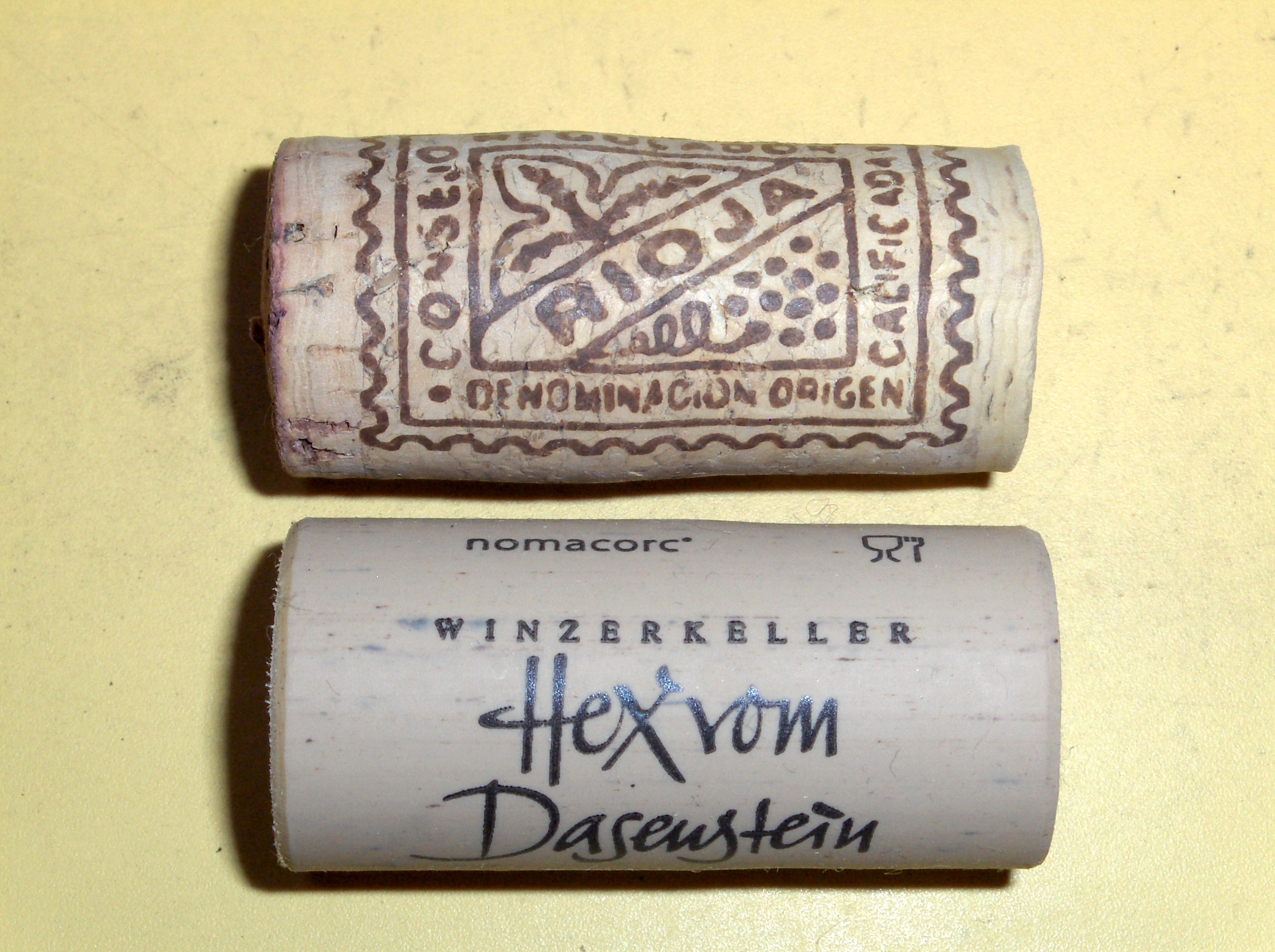
Natural (top) and synthetic (bottom) wine corks

Most wines are sold in glass bottles, traditionally sealed with a cork stopper. The standard volume of wine bottle is 75cl, although they can range from 18.7cl to 18 liters. The bottles used for sparkling wine must be thick to withstand the pressure of the gas behind the cork, which can be up to 6 standard atmospheres (88 psi).

Most cork for wine bottles comes from Alentejo, but a decline in quality in the late 20th century and an increase in demand spurred development of alternatives. An increasing number of wine producers use alternative closures such as screwcaps and synthetic "corks". Although alternative closures reduce the risk of cork taint, they have been blamed for causing excessive reduction.

Other containers include plastic bags within cardboard boxes (box or bag-in-box wines); aluminium cans; and stainless steel kegs (wine on tap).

=== Producing countries ===
2023 wine production estimates
Rank	Country	Production (million hecolitres)	Production (% of world)	Exports (million hecolitres)	Export market share (% of value in US$)
1	France	48.0	20.2%	12.7	33.3%
2	Italy	38.3	16.1%	21.4	21.6%
3	Spain	28.3	11.9%	20.8	8.2%
4	United States	24.3*	10.2%*	2.1	3.2%
5	Chile	11.0	4.6%	6.8	3.9%
6	Australia	9.6	4.1%	6.2	3.6%
7	South Africa	9.3	3.9%	3.5	1.6%
8	Argentina	8.8	3.7%	2.0	1.7%
9	Germany	8.6	3.6%	3.3	2.9%
10	Portugal	7.5	3.2%	3.2	2.6%
World		237.3			* Estimated

== Classification ==
Regulations govern the classification and sale of wine in many regions of the world. When one variety of grape is predominantly used, (Note: Defined by law as 85% in the European Union, South Africa, New Zealand, and Australia; 75% in Chile and the US.) the wine may be marketed as a "varietal" as opposed to a "blended" wine. Similarly, in order to state a vintage, a percentage of the grapes must have been harvested in the declared year. (Note: 85% in the EU, US, Australia, and New Zealand.)

=== European classifications ===
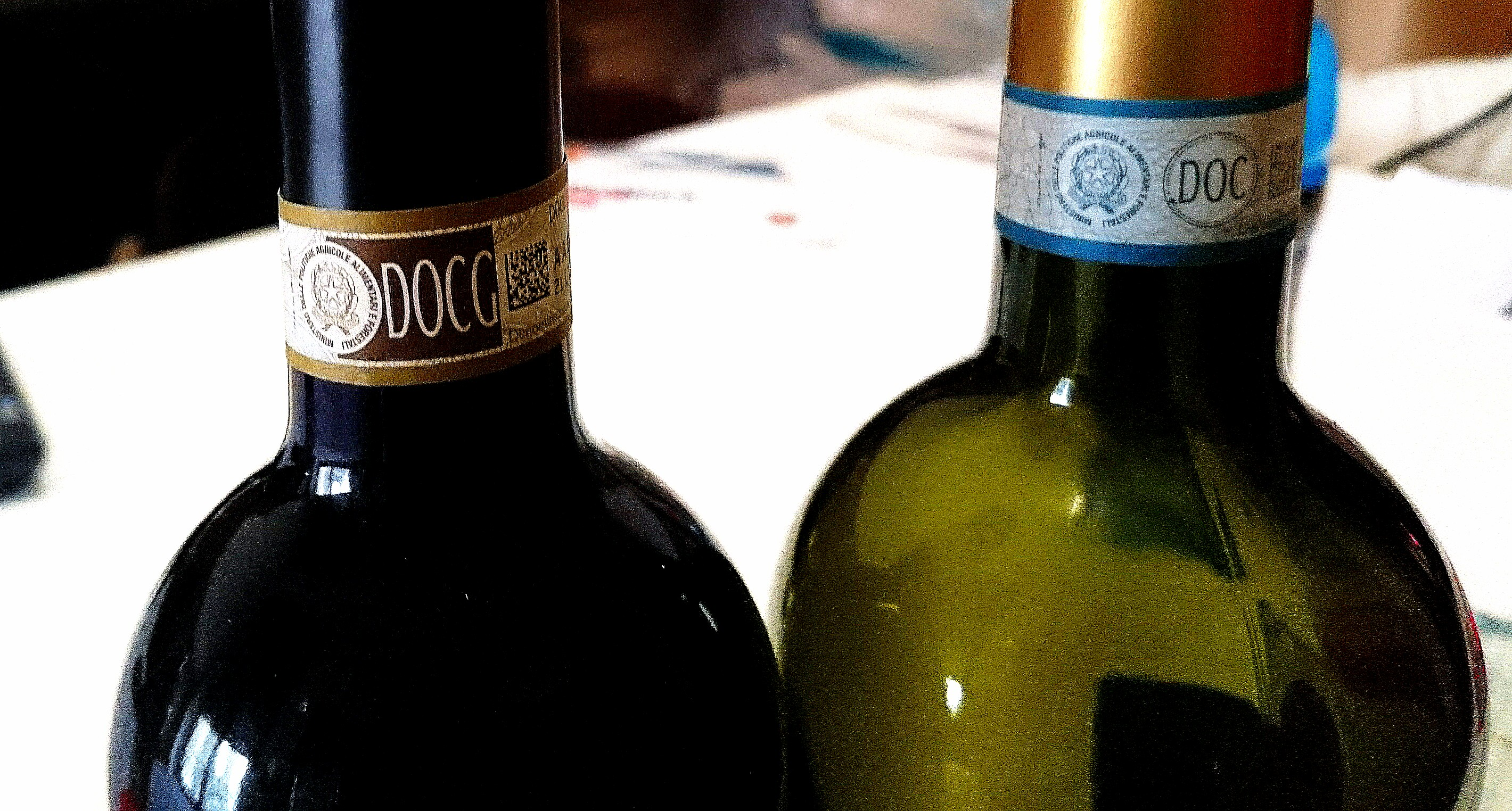
Italian wine bottleneck markings showing DOCG and DOC status

European wines tend to be classified by region (e.g. Bordeaux, Rioja and Chianti), with concomitant restrictions on grape varieties, yields and vinification methods.

Since 2009, wine from the European Union has been classified under the geographical indicators "protected geographical indication" (PGI) and "protected designation of origin" (PDO), which protect product names in order to promote the products of a specific area and the methods used. National regulations correspond to these designations and subdivide them, such as in Germany's Landwein and Qualitätswein, Italy's Denominazione di origine controllata (e garantita), and the French system of Appellation d'origine contrôlée.

The classification of Swiss wine was historically complex due to its system of federalism. It generally follows EU regulations to simplify exporting, although wine sold domestically does not need to. English wine follows rules for PGI and PDO products similar to the EU.

=== Outside Europe ===
New World wine classifications are generally limited to indications of geographical areas, such as in the American Viticultural Area and Australian Wine Geographical Indications systems. Australia also relies on awarding individual wines at prominent wine competitions, as well as in the influential publication Langton's Classification of Australian Wine. Some producers have created voluntary schemes to allow producers to indicate adherence to a stricter set of criteria than required by law, such as Appellation Marlborough Wine in New Zealand and Meritage in the USA. Overall, however, New World countries avoid rigid classification systems, allowing for more flexibility and experimentation.

=== Vintages ===
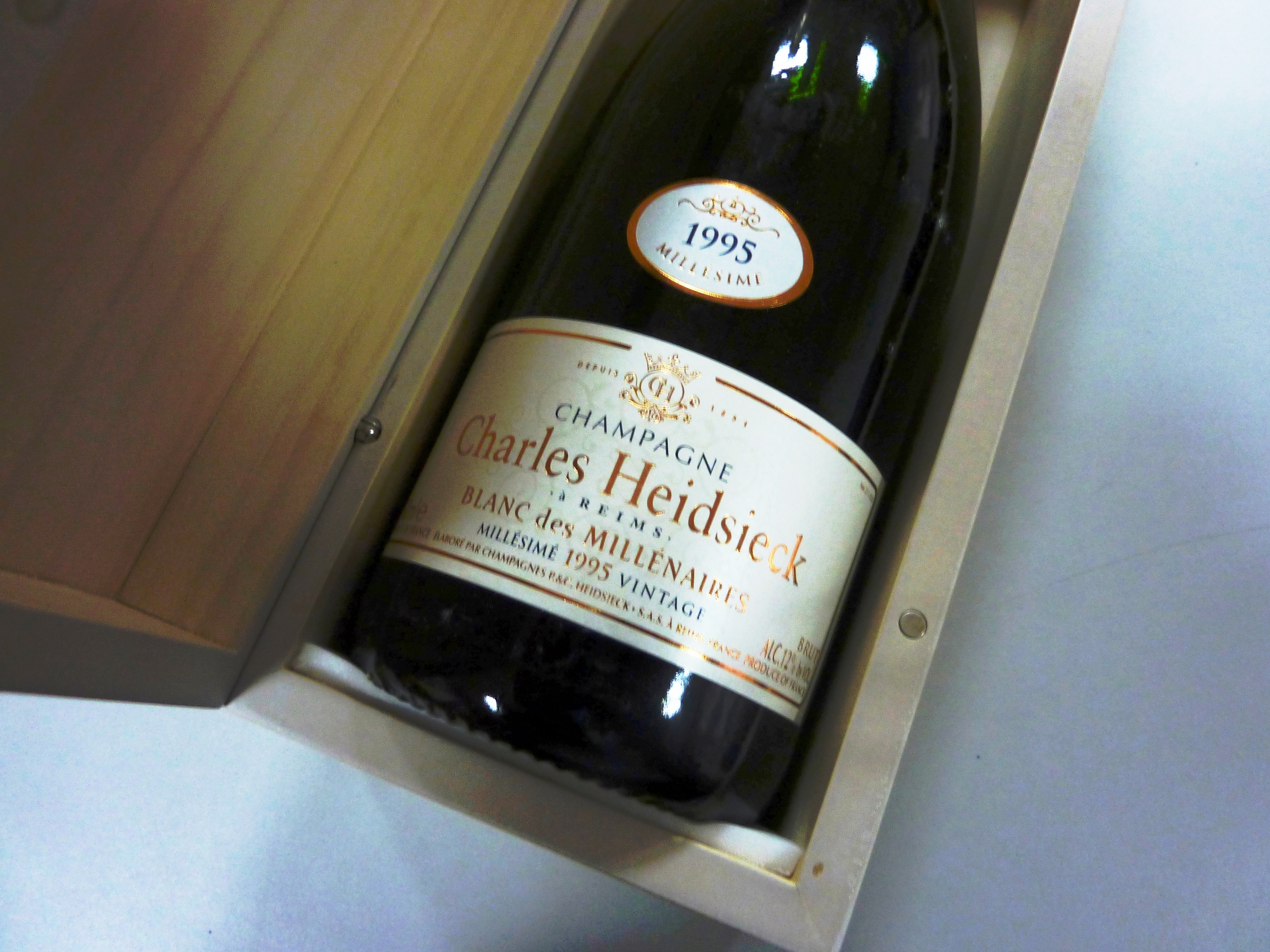
Vintage Champagne

Wine indicating a vintage contains the juice of grapes harvested that year, with the exception of Eiswein picked in early January, which is dated the previous year. Most of a vintage's characteristics are a result of the weather experienced by the vines during their growth cycle; the interaction between weather, grape varieties and terroir leads to different areas thriving under different conditions. In most of Europe, good vintages correlate with years of plenty of sunshine and average-to-warm temperatures, whereas bad vintages almost always occur in cold and/or wet years with little sunshine. In warmer climates, good vintages usually have average-to-cool temperatures. Even within a single area, however, aspects such as the soil type and depth can lead to different results, as can the variety of grape being grown, as different varieties tolerate different types of weather. Therefore vintages are rarely uniformly "good" or "bad" even within a small area.

For consistency, non-vintage wines can be blended from more than one vintage, which helps winemakers maintain a consistent flavor profile. This is common for Champagne, Port, Sherry and Madeira.

=== Forgery and manipulation ===
Wine fraud can take several forms, such as mixing a wine with a cheaper one to increase profits, surreptitiously adulterating it with additives, or passing it off as a more expensive wine by relabeling it. Such instances of fraud have a history dating back to Ancient Greece, but wine fraud has become less common overall since the late 19th century as legal frameworks and appellation systems have become stricter and more widespread. Nevertheless, the increase of the value of fine wines since the 1970s has led to a corresponding increase in relabeling fraud.

== Consumption ==
=== Serving ===
Decanting involves pouring the wine into an intermediate container before serving it in a glass, which allows the removal of undesirable sediments that may have formed in the wine. Sediment is more common in older bottles. Aeration in a decanter may benefit younger wines by "opening them up", releasing more flavor, but aerating older wines can oxidize them.

Serve tannic red wines relatively warm, 15–18 °C (59–64 °F)
Serve complex dry white wines relatively warm, 12–16 °C (54–61 °F)
Serve soft, lighter red wines for refreshment at 10–12 °C (50–54 °F)
Cool sweet, sparkling, flabby white and rosé wines, and those with any off-odour, at 6–10 °C (43–50 °F)

— Émile Peynaud, cited in The Oxford Companion to Wine

As a standard rule, red wines are served at what would historically have been "room temperature" (now, with modern heating and insulation, this would be considered the temperature of a cool room), whites chilled, and sparkling and sweeter whites even cooler. Volatile flavor compounds evaporate more easily at higher temperatures, so warmth increases the aromatic intensity. However, alcohol begins to evaporate noticeably over 20 °C (68 °F), and the carbon dioxide in sparkling wines is released too quickly at temperatures of about 18 °C (64 °F). The palate is more sensitive to sweetness at higher temperatures, so when the sweetness is not balanced by acidity a wine should be served cooler. Cooler temperatures suppress aroma, and therefore faults detectable on the nose, but increase sensitivity to tannins and bitterness.

=== Tasting ===
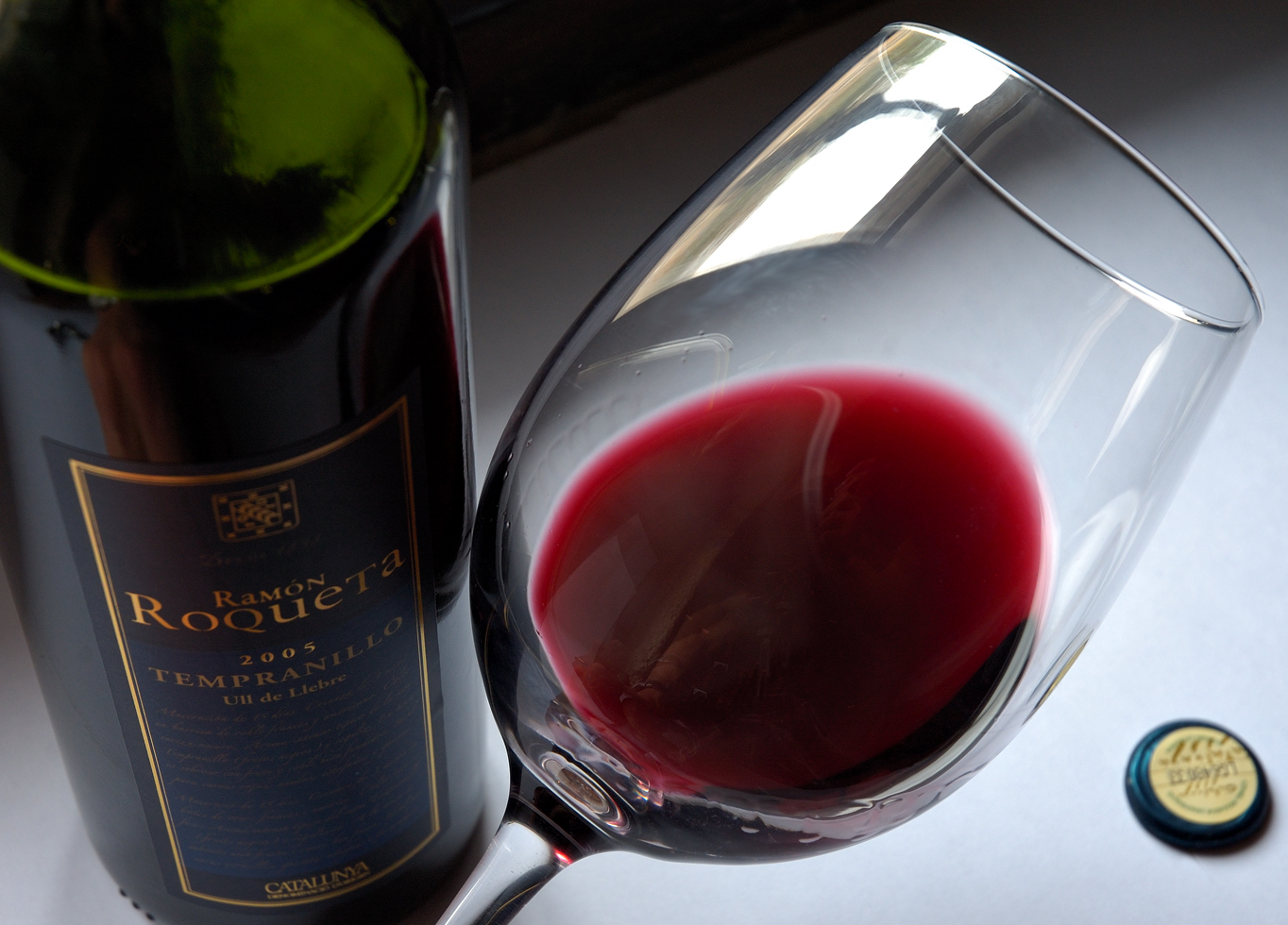
Tilting the glass and judging a wine's color against a white background is often one of the first steps in tasting a wine.

Wine tasting is the sensory examination and evaluation of wine, allowing the consumer to identify faults and appreciate the product. Tasting takes place in many different settings, from casual social engagements to blind tasting examinations. Tasting a wine typically involves assessing its appearance, smell, and taste.

When judging a wine's appearance, faults can be apparent due to cloudiness or unexpected effervescence. The color of the wine may indicate its age, with red wines becoming paler and white wines becoming darker, although color is also influenced by the grapes used. "Legs" or "tears" – lines formed on the glass after swirling – indicate high alcohol content or sweetness.

A wine's "nose" (aroma) may range from neutral to pungent, and informs most of the experience of tasting a wine. Tasters often use a wide range of descriptors to compare wine aromas to other things, from fruits and vegetables such as pineapple and asparagus to non-consumables such as compost heaps and leather. The origin of these scents may be the grapes used, or the fermentation or maturation process. When the nose includes an undesirable scent, this may indicate a fault.

On the palate the taster experiences the mouthfeel of the wine, including its sweetness, acidity, bitterness, tannins, and alcohol, as well as saltiness in the case of sherry. Once the wine is swallowed or spat out, the length of time the flavours remain detectable is an indicator of quality.

=== Global popularity ===
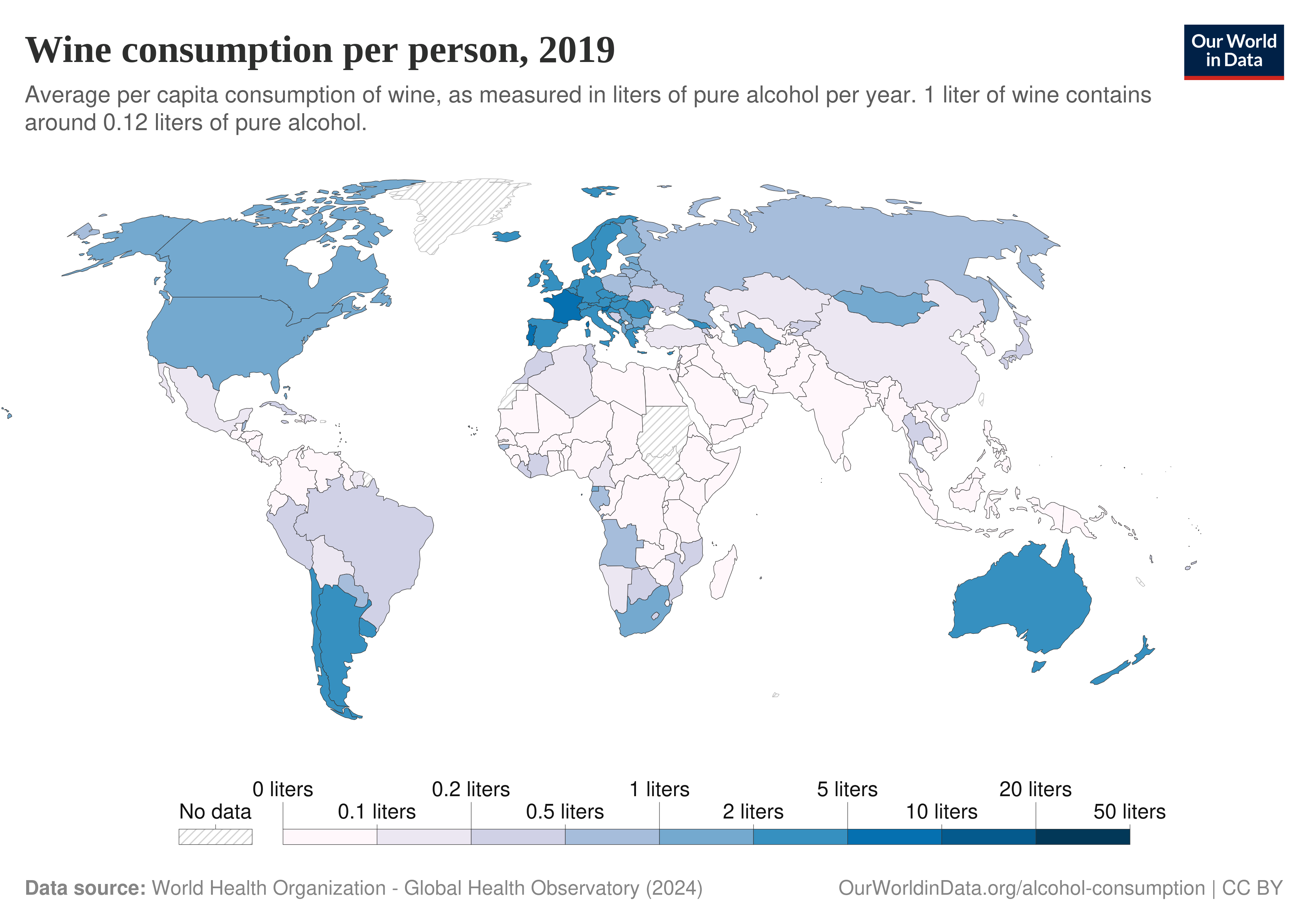
Wine consumption per person, 2019

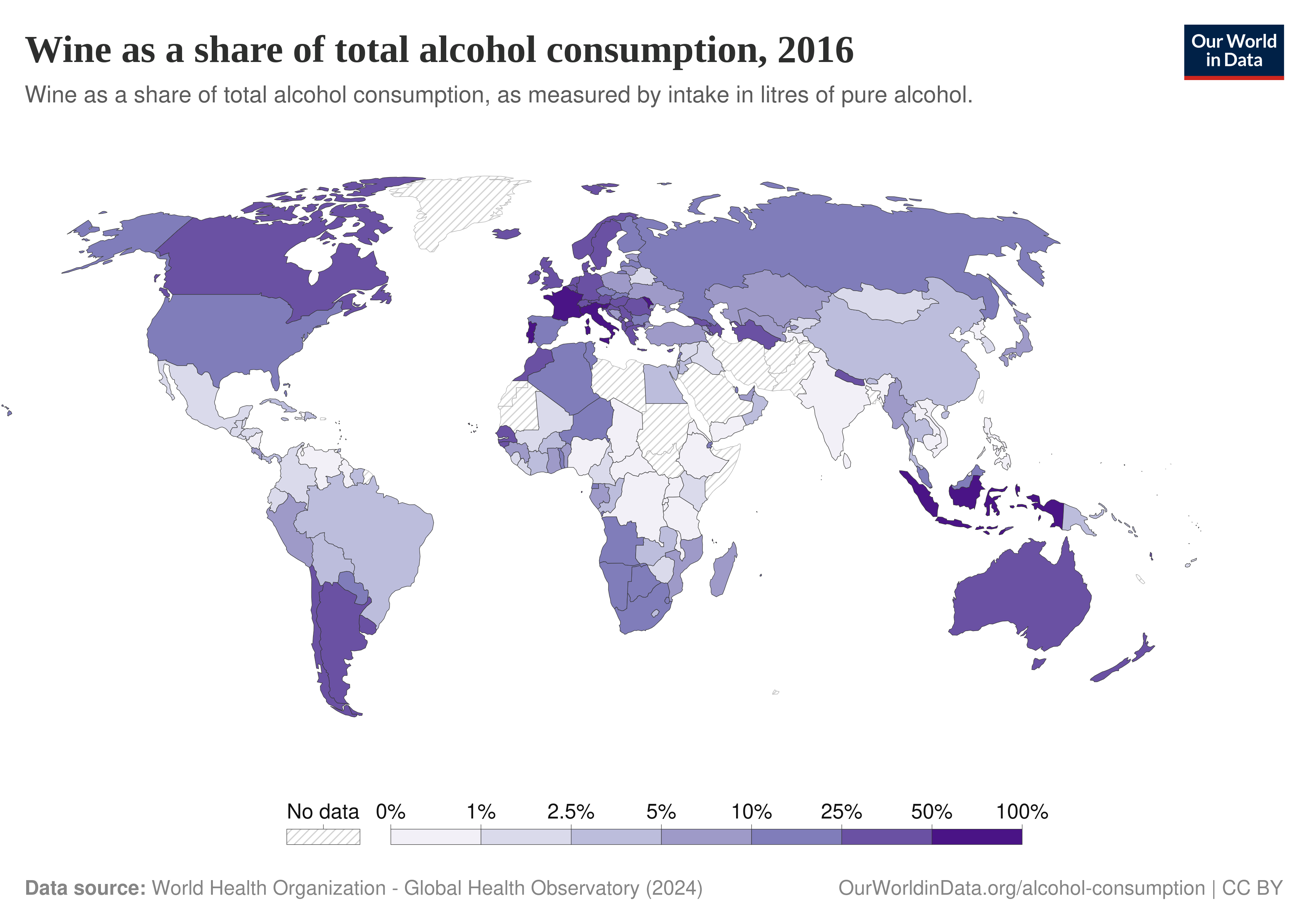
Wine as a share of total alcohol consumption, 2016

The total global consumption of wine was in decline in the early 2010s, primarily because the French and Italians were drinking considerably less. As of 2019, however, this trend appears to be reversing due to an increase in popularity with younger Americans and the Chinese. The 2024 global market was estimated at US$515.1 billion, with a projected compound annual growth rate of 7.1% between 2025 and 2030. Trends include a growing demand for organic wine, and for higher-quality products which justify a higher price point.

=== Culinary uses ===
Wine is important in cuisine; it can be used in preparation and tenderizing, as well as a flavor agent in marinades, stocks, stews (e.g. coq au vin, beef bourguignon), and sauces (e.g. in wine sauces). Many desserts also contain wine, such as zabaione and trifle. Ethanol evaporates at 78 °C (172 °F), so when wine is heated past this point it likely loses much of its alcohol content, and its acidity and sugars become more prominent. The necessary quality of cooking wine is a matter of debate, but faulty wine is not appropriate for culinary use, and the range of flavor compounds in a fine wine do not survive heating.

=== Health effects ===
Red table wine
Nutritional value per 100 g (3.5 oz)
- Energy: 355 kJ (85 kcal)
- Carbohydrates: 2.6 g
- Sugars: 0.6 g
- Fat: 0.0 g
- Protein: 0.1 g
- Other constituents: Quantity
- Alcohol (ethanol): 10.6 g
- 10.6 g alcohol is 13%vol. 100 g wine is approximately 100 ml (3.4 fl oz.); Sugar and alcohol content can vary.

Some studies have shown an association between moderate wine consumption and a decrease in cardiovascular and all-cause mortality. However, alcohol consumption is also associated with an increased risk of a number of other health conditions, such as cancer.

The stilbene resveratrol has shown cardioprotective attributes in humans. Grape skins naturally produce resveratrol in response to fungal infection, including exposure to yeast during fermentation. Nevertheless, the potential harms of regular alcohol consumption are considered to outweigh any such benefits.

Research by Pesticide Action Network found that European wines contain large amounts of PFAS ("forever chemicals"), particularly TFA, which have long-term negative health consequences.

=== Storage ===
Many wines improve with age; conversely, wines can reduce in quality over time by suboptimal storage conditions, such as being exposed to strong light and heat. Optimal conditions are provided by wine cellars and wine caves, as well as temperature-controlled cabinets.

The ideal temperature for wine storage is 12–13 °C (54–55 °F) with a humidity of 65–70%. Lower humidity levels and temperature fluctuations can dry out or stress a cork over time, allowing oxygen to enter the bottle, which reduces the wine's quality through oxidation. Wines with corks are typically stored horizontally to help keep the cork moist, but this is not necessary for screwcaps.

== In society ==
=== Collecting ===
Investment by buying bottles and cases of the most desirable wines became especially popular during the early 21st century, due to an increase in the global popularity of wine as well as low interest rates driving demand for alternatives which may yield higher returns. Bordeaux is especially popular for investment, due to its fame, high volume of output, longevity, and relatively simple naming system. Burgundy is also popular, with the 2016 Romanée-Conti fetching £3,250 per bottle, as well as Italian wines such as Barolo, Barbaresco, and those of Tuscany.

Wines may also be bought and then aged for future consumption. Most wine is intended to be drunk within a year of bottling, but top-quality wines are usually sold long before they reach their optimal drinking window, with flavors developing in the bottle over many years. Estimating the optimal time to consume a wine is impossible to do accurately, partly because it is only clear that the ideal time has passed when the quality starts to decline, but also because bottle variation and differences in storage create differences even between wines of the same vintage and batch.

=== Social consumption ===
People drink wine for a number of reasons, including to aid socialization, to pair with food, and simply as a sensory experience. Wine is increasingly viewed as a "lifestyle" product, with a concomitant interest in associated activities such as wine tourism. Producers have used an increased interest in the Mediterranean diet, with wine as one of its constituent parts, to drive sales; in continental western Europe, wine is considered an everyday pleasure.

In London, wine bars date from the 19th century, and they became popular in the 1970s in France, and the 1980s in London and New York City. They have experienced a resurgence in more recent years, and in Britain are often based on European cafés.

Sommeliers have become increasingly prominent in fine dining establishments as in-house experts, especially for wine and food pairing, with their tastes influencing the wider market as well. As consumer knowledge has improved, and with the popularity of tasting menus and experimental dishes which are difficult to pair, their public image may have become more important than their traditional role of recommending a wine to drink with a meal.

=== In the arts ===
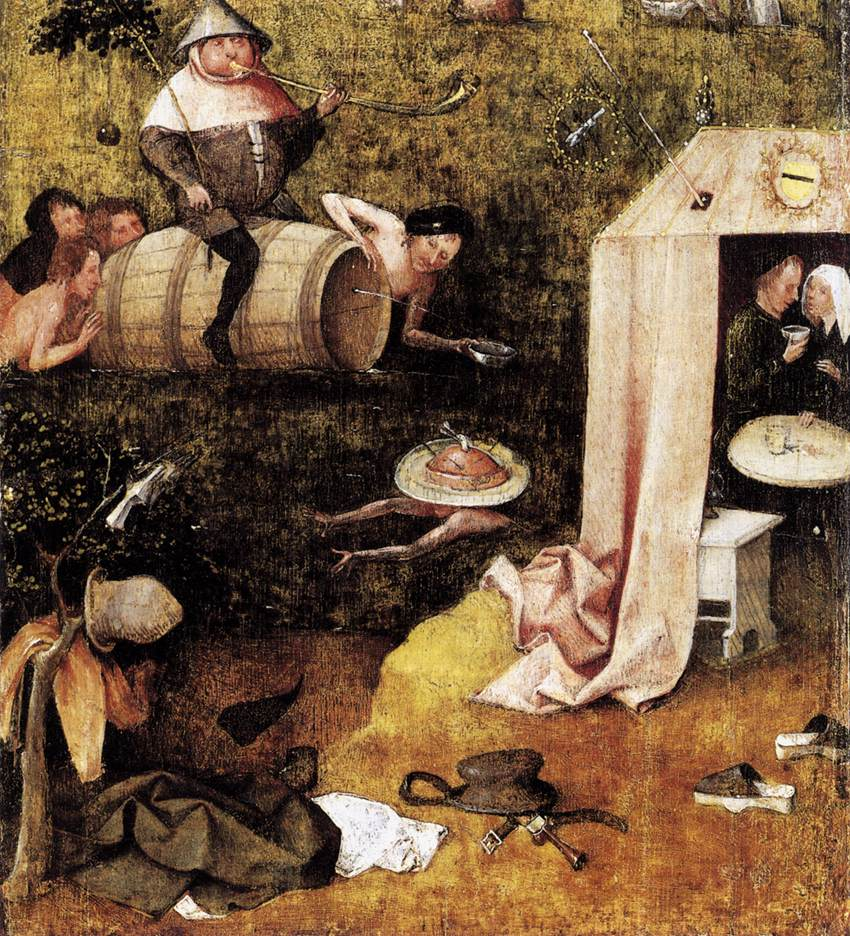
Allegory of Gluttony and Lust by Hieronymus Bosch, c. 1495 – c. 1500

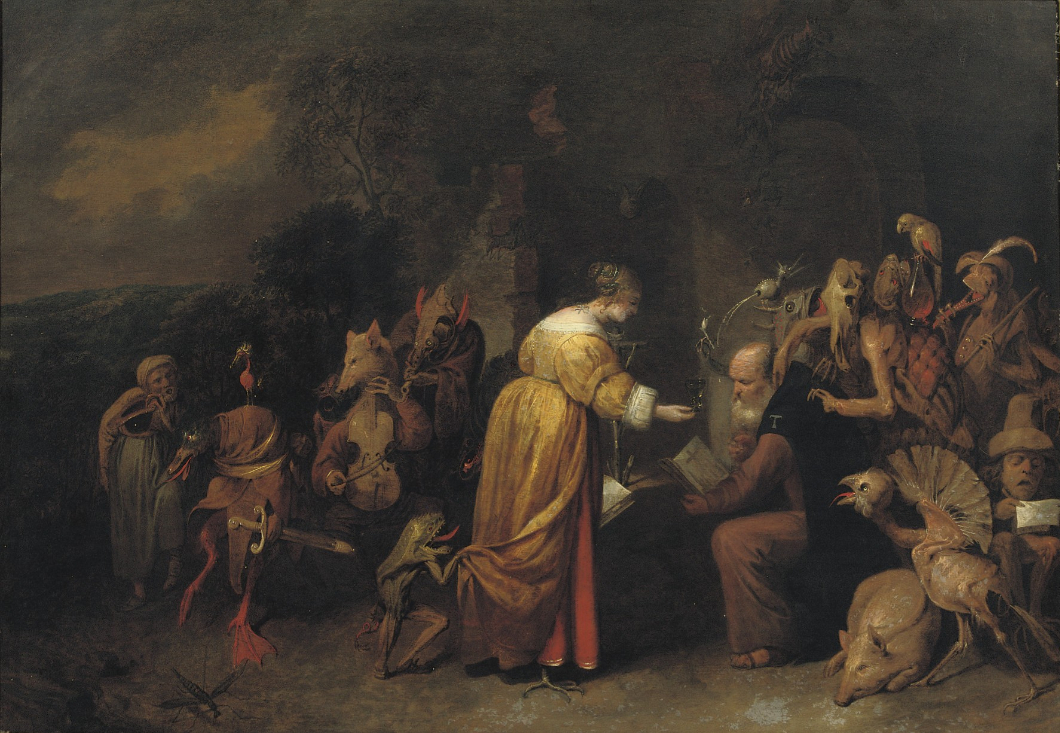
Temptation of St Anthony by David Ryckaert III, 1649

A Bar at the Folies-Bergère by Édouard Manet, 1882

Wine connoisseurship began to flourish in the late Middle Ages and into the Renaissance, and comparisons between wines were written in verse, with examples such as Battle of the Wines by Henri d'Andeli and Nuova trattato della varietà, e qualità dei vini, che vengono in Roma by Giovanni Battista Scarlino. Biblical scenes which feature wine, such as the Last Supper, Wedding at Cana, Noah's drunkenness, and the Parable of the Prodigal Son, were popular with painters. Later Renaissance poets and artists would also depict the figure of Bacchus, such as in Parthenopeus by Giovanni Pontano (c. 1450), which refers to him "the nurse of love". In northern Europe, wine served to represent folly or gluttony, as in Allegory of Gluttony and Lust by Hieronymus Bosch.

This moralizing perspective became common in 17th century verse, incorporated into a theme of memento mori in which the vice of drinking leads imbibers to the grave. Wine negatively affects several Shakespeare characters, such as Cassio in Othello and the Duke of Clarence in Richard III, and the works of John Milton contain several negative references to wine. Drinking songs, extant since antiquity, flourished in England during this period, with traveling balladeers using alcohol as inspiration as they composed and performed in the increasing number of alehouses. The depiction of the "Temptation of St Anthony" by David Ryckaert III shows the saint being tempted primarily by wine, with music also featuring as a prominent temptation.

In the 19th century, avant-garde paintings inspired by everyday life naturally featured wine, often as the catalyst for overindulgence and drunkenness. An example of this is Manet's 1882 painting A Bar at the Folies-Bergère, which depicts a bar and crowd at a music hall, the bar replete with Champagne. Classically inspired scenes such as the bacchanalia continued to feature in 20th century artworks by artists such as André Derain and Pablo Picasso, tending to depict wine consumption in a more positive light.

There are hundreds of examples of poetry from the 19th and 20th centuries featuring wine, notably Don Juan by Lord Byron, which "recall[s] the classical carpe diem philosophy of Theognis and Horace". Byron in Don Juan and his contemporary John Keats in the 1817 poem "Give me women, wine and snuff" play with the centuries-old phrase "wine, women and song", which links wine to other hedonistic pleasures in a hendiatris. The phrase in its original German was also used for the title of the waltz Wein, Weib und Gesang by Johann Strauss II in 1869. Both "Villanelle of the Poet's Road" by Ernest Christopher Dowson (1899) and "A Drinking Song" by Yeats (1910) combine this hedonistic attitude with a somber memento mori theme.

Wine features in many 21st century songs and films, and acts as the central topic of the 2004 film Sideways, whose popularity had a measurable effect on wine sales in the US. Research has demonstrated that music can enhance the experience of drinking wine, an example of crossmodal perception, and Champagne producer Krug provides pairing suggestions for music and its wines.

=== In religion ===
==== Ancient religions ====
Dionysus, the Ancient Greek god of wine, is attested from around 1200 BCE, with a distinct personality becoming apparent by the eighth century BCE. Festivals in his name took place in wine-producing regions across Greece and Asia Minor in autumn or early spring, respectively when grapes were harvested or wine was released. He was one of the most frequently represented figures in classical art and literature.

Bacchus was the incarnation of Dionysus in the Roman pantheon. It is unclear when his cult gained popularity, but in 186 BCE the Senate forbade rites in his honor in the decree Senatus consultum de Bacchanalibus. He features on many Roman sarcophagi, appearing to represent "an agent of deliverance from earthly concerns", in a similar way to how the Greeks viewed him.

==== Modern religions ====
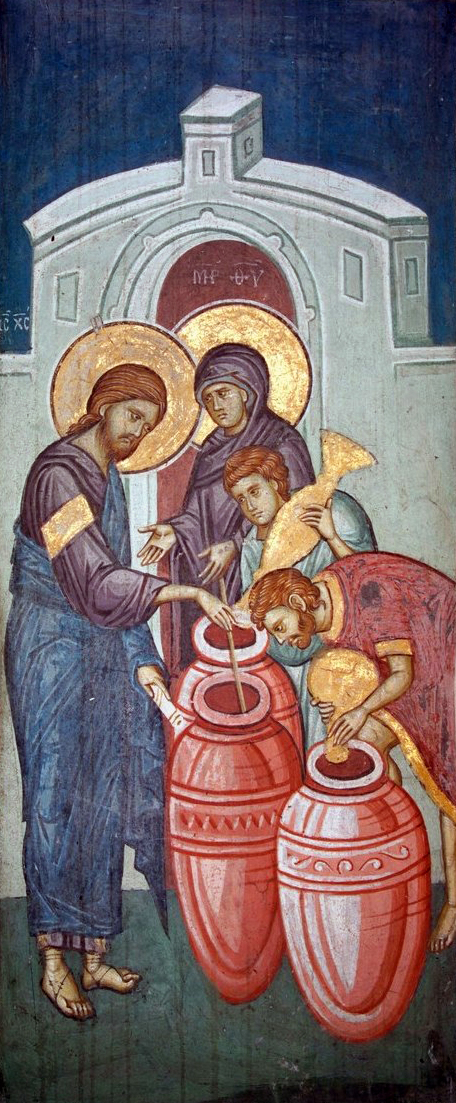
Jesus making wine from water at the Marriage at Cana

Wine forms an integral part of Jewish laws and traditions. The Derekh Eretz Rabbah and the Tosefta detail strict rules on the drinking of wine, and excessive consumption is condemned by scripture. Nevertheless, wine is approved as a medicine in the Talmud. The Kiddush is a blessing recited over wine or grape juice to sanctify the Shabbat, and during the Passover Seder, it is a Rabbinic obligation of adults to drink four cups of wine.

Wine was drunk at the Last Supper, during which Jesus Christ used it as a metaphor for his blood – this forms a key part of the Eucharist and informs theological ideas on the real presence of Christ in the Eucharist, being a key symbol of salvation. The centrality of wine in the Eucharist led to monks growing grapes to make wine, and monasteries became important agents in wine production during the Middle Ages.

Alcoholic drinks, including wine, are forbidden under most interpretations of Islamic law. The Qur'an, cited as the root of this prohibition, portrays wine in various lights, including as an "abomination" as well as a reward ("rivers of wine") in Jannah. By contrast, the Hadith consistently condemns wine, although it is not explicitly prohibited.

== See also ==
- Classification of wine
- Glossary of wine terms
- Health effects of wine
- List of grape varieties
- Maceration (wine)
- Outline of wine
- Storage of wine
- Viticulture
- Winemaking

== Sources ==
- Charters, Steve (2006). Wine and Society. Oxford: Elsevier Butterworth-Heinemann. ISBN 978-0-7506-6635-0.
- Demoissier, Marion (2010). Wine Drinking Culture in France. Cardiff: University of Wales Press. ISBN 978-1-78316-122-5.
- Godfrey, Spence (2003). Wine Tasting. Chicago: Contemporary Books. pp. 1–3. OL 18141471M.
- Johnson, Hugh (1992). Vintage: The Story of Wine. Simon and Schuster. pp. 86–87. OL 7665276M.
- Johnson, Hugh; Robinson, Jancis (2019). The World Atlas of Wine (8th ed.). London: Mitchell Beazley. ISBN 978-1-78472-403-0.
- Mieder, Wolfgang (1989). ""Wine, Women and Song": From Martin Luther to American T-Shirts". In Oring, Elliott (ed.). Folk Groups and Folklore Genres: A Reader. Logan: Utah State University Press. pp. 279–290.
- "State of the World Vine and Wine Sector in 2023" (PDF). OIV. International Organisation of Vine and Wine. April 2024.
- Phillips, Rod (2000). A Short History of Wine. New York: Ecco. pp. 62–63. OL 3943121M.
- Robinson, Jancis, ed. (2006). The Oxford Companion to Wine (3rd ed.). Oxford: Oxford University Press. ISBN 978-0-19-860990-2. OL 7401546M.
- Varriano, John (2011). Wine: A Cultural History. London: Reaktion Books. p. 19. OL 36780756M.
- Weed, Augustus (22 May 2019). "Canned Wine Comes of Age". Wine Spectator. Archived from the original on 23 May 2019.
- "The ultimate guide to wine bottle shapes and sizes". WSET Global. 8 July 2024.
