= Coutaric acid =

- Chemical structure of coutaric acid

Names
- Preferred IUPAC name (2R,3R)-2-Hydroxy-3-{[(2E)-3-(4-hydroxyphenyl)prop-2-enoyl]oxy}butanedioic acid
- Other names trans-coutaric acid cis-coutaric acid trans-p-Coumaroyltartaric acid cis-p-coumaroyl-(+)-tartaric acid trans-p-coumaroyl-(+)-tartaric acid cis-Coumaroyl tartaric acidbr>trans-Coumaroyl tartaric acid

Identifiers
CAS Number	27174-07-8
3D model (JSmol)	Interactive image
ChEBI	CHEBI:77439
ChemSpider	26325199
PubChem CID	57517924
UNII	K874CF6AHR
CompTox Dashboard (EPA)	DTXSID80726998
- InChI: InChI=1S/C13H12O8/c14-8-4-1-7(2-5-8)3-6-9(15)21-11(13(19)20)10(16)12(17)18/h1-6,10-11,14,16H,(H,17,18)(H,19,20)/b6-3+/t10-,11-/m1/s1 Key: INYJZRKTYXTZHP-NNPIPJJVSA-N; InChI=1/C13H12O8/c14-8-4-1-7(2-5-8)3-6-9(15)21-11(13(19)20)10(16)12(17)18/h1-6,10-11,14,16H,(H,17,18)(H,19,20)/b6-3+/t10-,11-/m1/s1 Key: INYJZRKTYXTZHP-NNPIPJJVBX
- SMILES: c1cc(ccc1/C=C/C(=O)O[C@H]([C@H](C(=O)O)O)C(=O)O)O

Properties
Chemical formula	C_{13}H_{12}O_{8}
Molar mass	296.231 g·mol^{−1}
- Except where otherwise noted, data are given for materials in their standard state (at 25 °C [77 °F], 100 kPa). verify (what is ?) Infobox references

Coutaric acid is a hydroxycinnamoyltartaric acid found in wine, pomace and grape. It is an ester formed from coumaric acid and tartaric acid.
