= Chicoric acid =

Chemical compound

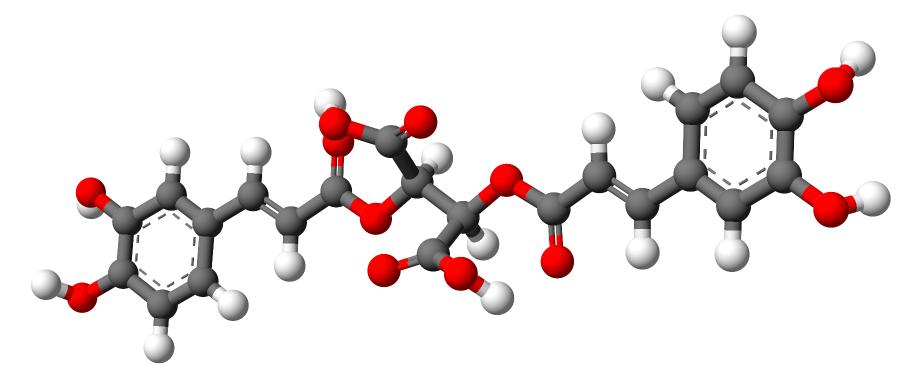

Names
- Preferred IUPAC name (2R,3R)-2,3-Bis{[(2E)-3-(3,4-dihydroxyphenyl)prop-2-enoyl]oxy}butanedioic acid
- Other names Cichoric acid; (2R,3R)-O-Dicaffeoyltartaric acid

Identifiers
CAS Number	6537-80-0
3D model (JSmol)	Interactive image
ChEMBL	ChEMBL282731
ChemSpider	4445078
ECHA InfoCard	100.109.212
KEGG	C10437
PubChem CID	5281764
UNII	S4YY3V8YHD
CompTox Dashboard (EPA)	DTXSID0033332
- InChI: InChI=1S/C22H18O12/c23-13-5-1-11(9-15(13)25)3-7-17(27)33-19(21(29)30)20(22(31)32)34-18(28)8-4-12-2-6-14(24)16(26)10-12/h1-10,19-20,23-26H,(H,29,30)(H,31,32)/b7-3+,8-4+/t19-,20-/m1/s1 Key: YDDGKXBLOXEEMN-IABMMNSOSA-N; InChI=1/C22H18O12/c23-13-5-1-11(9-15(13)25)3-7-17(27)33-19(21(29)30)20(22(31)32)34-18(28)8-4-12-2-6-14(24)16(26)10-12/h1-10,19-20,23-26H,(H,29,30)(H,31,32)/b7-3+,8-4+/t19-,20-/m1/s1 Key: YDDGKXBLOXEEMN-IABMMNSOBV
- SMILES: O=C(O)[C@H](OC(=O)\C=C\c1ccc(O)c(O)c1)[C@@H](OC(=O)\C=C\c2cc(O)c(O)cc2)C(=O)O

Properties
Chemical formula	C_{22}H_{18}O_{12}
Molar mass	474.371 g/mol
- Except where otherwise noted, data are given for materials in their standard state (at 25 °C [77 °F], 100 kPa). verify (what is ?) Infobox references

Chicoric acid (also known as cichoric acid) is a hydroxycinnamic acid, an organic compound of the phenylpropanoid class and occurs in a variety of plant species. It is a derivative of both caffeic acid and tartaric acid.

As a suitable marker for the distinction of Echinacea species, it is often assayed using RP-HPLC and Thin layer chromatography (TLC) methods.

== Sources ==
Chicoric acid has first been isolated from Cichorium intybus (chicory) but also occurs in significant amounts in Echinacea, in particular E. purpurea, dandelion leaves, basil, lemon balm, and aquatic plants, including algae and seagrasses.

== Biological functions ==
Chicoric acid has been shown to stimulate phagocytosis in both in vitro and in vivo studies, to inhibit the function of hyaluronidase (an enzyme that breaks down hyaluronic acid in the human body), to protect collagen from damage due to free radicals, and to inhibit the function of HIV-1 integrase.

== See also ==
- Caftaric acid (monocaffeyltartaric acid)
