= Anthocyanin 5-O-glucosyltransferase =

Anthocyanin 5-O-glucosyltransferase is an enzyme that forms anthocyanin 3,5-O-diglucoside from anthocyanin 3-O-glucoside.

There are several types of anthocyanins (as the glycoside) found in wine grapes which are responsible for the vast range of coloring from ruby red through to dark black found in wine grapes. Ampelographers can use this observation to assist in the identification of different grape varieties. The European vine family Vitis vinifera is characterized by anthocyanins that are composed of only one molecule of glucose while non-vinifera vines such as hybrids and the American Vitis labrusca will have anthocyanins with two molecules. This phenomenon is due to a double mutation in the anthocyanin 5-O-glucosyltransferase gene of V. vinifera. In the mid-20th century, French ampelographers used this knowledge to test the various vine varieties throughout France to identify which vineyards still contained non-vinifera plantings.

== See also ==
- Malvin (Malvidin 3,5-diglucoside)
