= Caftaric acid =

Names
- Preferred IUPAC name (2R,3R)-2-{[(2E)-3-(3,4-Dihydroxyphenyl)prop-2-enoyl]oxy}-3-hydroxybutanedioic acid
- Other names Monocaffeyltartaric acid Butanedioic acid, 2-(3-(3,4-dihydroxyphenyl)-1-oxo-2-propenyl)-3-hydroxy-, (R-(R*,R*-(E)))- trans-Caftaric acid cis-Caftaric acid trans-Caffeoyl tartaric acid cis-Caffeoyl tartaric acid

Identifiers
CAS Number	67879-58-7
3D model (JSmol)	Interactive image; Interactive image
ChEMBL	ChEMBL558557
ChemSpider	4944664
ECHA InfoCard	100.107.739
MeSH	caftaric+acid
PubChem CID	6440397
UNII	WCV7W3174L
CompTox Dashboard (EPA)	DTXSID3036866
- InChI: InChI=1S/C13H12O9/c14-7-3-1-6(5-8(7)15)2-4-9(16)22-11(13(20)21)10(17)12(18)19/h1-5,10-11,14-15,17H,(H,18,19)(H,20,21)/b4-2+/t10-,11-/m1/s1 Key: SWGKAHCIOQPKFW-JTNORFRNSA-N; InChI=1S/C13H12O9/c14-7-3-1-6(5-8(7)15)2-4-9(16)22-11(13(20)21)10(17)12(18)19/h1-5,10-11,14-15,17H,(H,18,19)(H,20,21)/b4-2+/t10-,11-/m1/s1 Key: SWGKAHCIOQPKFW-JTNORFRNBW; Key: SWGKAHCIOQPKFW-JTNORFRNSA-N
- SMILES: O=C(O)[C@H](O)[C@@H](OC(=O)\C=C\c1cc(O)c(O)cc1)C(=O)O; C1=CC(=C(C=C1/C=C/C(=O)O[C@H]([C@H](C(=O)O)O)C(=O)O)O)O

Properties
Chemical formula	C_{13}H_{12}O_{9}
Molar mass	312.230 g·mol^{−1}
- Except where otherwise noted, data are given for materials in their standard state (at 25 °C [77 °F], 100 kPa). verify (what is ?) Infobox references

Caftaric acid is a non-flavonoid phenolic compound.

It is found in the juice of grapes (Vitis vinifera) and impacts the color of white wine.

It is an esterified phenolic acid, composed of caffeic acid, a hydroxycinnamate produced by plants, and tartaric acid, the principal organic acid found in grape berries. As such, caftaric acid is found in all grape juices and wines. During alcoholic and malolactic fermentation, the ester can be enzymatically hydrolysed, releasing the two constituents. Caffeic acid is susceptible to chemical oxidation, and subsequent redox reactions involving caffeic acid can contribute to wine browning over time, and the straw-gold color that can develop in some white wines after bottling.

Aside from wine, it is abundantly present in raisins. It also occurs in Cichorium intybus (common chicory) and is one of the bioactive components of Echinacea purpurea (Eastern purple coneflower).

Caftaric acid has a good bioavailability when fed in rats. Intact trans-caftaric acid was detected in rat plasma along with its O-methylated derivative trans-fertaric acid.

== In wine ==
Winemakers measure caftaric acid levels as their primary method to estimate the oxidation levels that a wine has undergone. For example, press wines, which undergo a high degree of oxidation, will have little to no caftaric acid.

Grape reaction product (2-S glutathionyl caftaric acid) is an oxidation compound produced from caftaric acid and found in wine. Malvidin 3-glucoside alone is not oxidized in the presence of grape polyphenol oxidase (PPO), whereas it is degraded in the presence of a crude grape PPO extract and of caftaric acid, forming anthocyanidin-caftaric acid adducts.

== See also ==
- Chicoric acid (dicaffeoyltartaric acid)
