= Fertaric acid =

- Chemical structure of fertaric acid (2S,3S)-stereoisomer

Names
- IUPAC name 2-Hydroxy-3-{[(2E)-3-(4-hydroxy-3methoxyphenyl)prop-2-enoyl]oxy}butandioic acid

Identifiers
CAS Number	2S,3S,trans: 74282-22-7
3D model (JSmol)	Interactive image; 2S,3S,trans: Interactive image
ChEBI	2S,3S,trans: CHEBI:76120; 2S,3S,cis: CHEBI:76118; 2R,3R,trans: CHEBI:76116; 2R,3R,cis: CHEBI:76115
ChemSpider	20058463
PubChem CID	22298372; 2S,3S,trans: 641605
CompTox Dashboard (EPA)	DTXSID001029675
- InChI: InChI=1S/C14H14O9/c1-22-9-6-7(2-4-8(9)15)3-5-10(16)23-12(14(20)21)11(17)13(18)19/h2-6,11-12,15,17H,1H3,(H,18,19)(H,20,21)/b5-3+ Key: XIWXUSFCUBAMFH-HWKANZROSA-N; 2S,3S,trans: InChI=1S/C14H14O9/c1-22-9-6-7(2-4-8(9)15)3-5-10(16)23-12(14(20)21)11(17)13(18)19/h2-6,11-12,15,17H,1H3,(H,18,19)(H,20,21)/b5-3+/t11-,12-/m0/s1 Key: XIWXUSFCUBAMFH-SCBUBVSKSA-N
- SMILES: Oc1ccc(cc1OC)/C=C/C(=O)OC(C(=O)O)C(O)C(=O)O; 2S,3S,trans: COC1=C(C=CC(=C1)/C=C/C(=O)O[C@@H]([C@@H](C(=O)O)O)C(=O)O)O

Properties
Chemical formula	C_{14}H_{14}O_{9}
Molar mass	326.257 g·mol^{−1}
- Except where otherwise noted, data are given for materials in their standard state (at 25 °C [77 °F], 100 kPa). verify (what is ?) Infobox references

Fertaric acid is a hydroxycinnamic acid found in wine and grapes. It is an ester formed from ferulic acid bound to tartaric acid.

It is a metabolite of caftaric acid after caftaric acid has been fed to rats. Fertaric acid is then found in plasma, kidney, and urine.
