= Hydroxycinnamic acid =

Class of chemical compounds

Hydroxycinnamic acids (hydroxycinnamates) are a class of aromatic acids or phenylpropanoids having a C_{6}–C_{3} skeleton. These compounds are hydroxy derivatives of cinnamic acid.

In the category of phytochemicals that can be found in food, there are:

- α-Cyano-4-hydroxycinnamic acid
- Caffeic acid – burdock, hawthorn, artichoke, pear, basil, thyme, oregano, apple
- Cichoric acid
- Cinnamic acid – aloe
- Chlorogenic acid – echinacea, strawberries, pineapple, coffee, sunflower, blueberries
- Diferulic acids
- Coumaric acid
- Ferulic acid (3-methoxy-4-hydroxycinnamic acid) – oats, rice, artichoke, orange, pineapple, apple, peanut
- Sinapinic acid (3,5-dimethoxy-4-hydroxycinnamic acid or sinapic acid)

== Hydroxycinnamoyltartaric acids ==
- Caftaric acid – grapes and wine, mainly the trans isomer
- Coutaric acid – grapes and wine, both trans and cis isomers
- Fertaric acid – grapes and wine, mainly the trans isomer
