= Myrobalan =

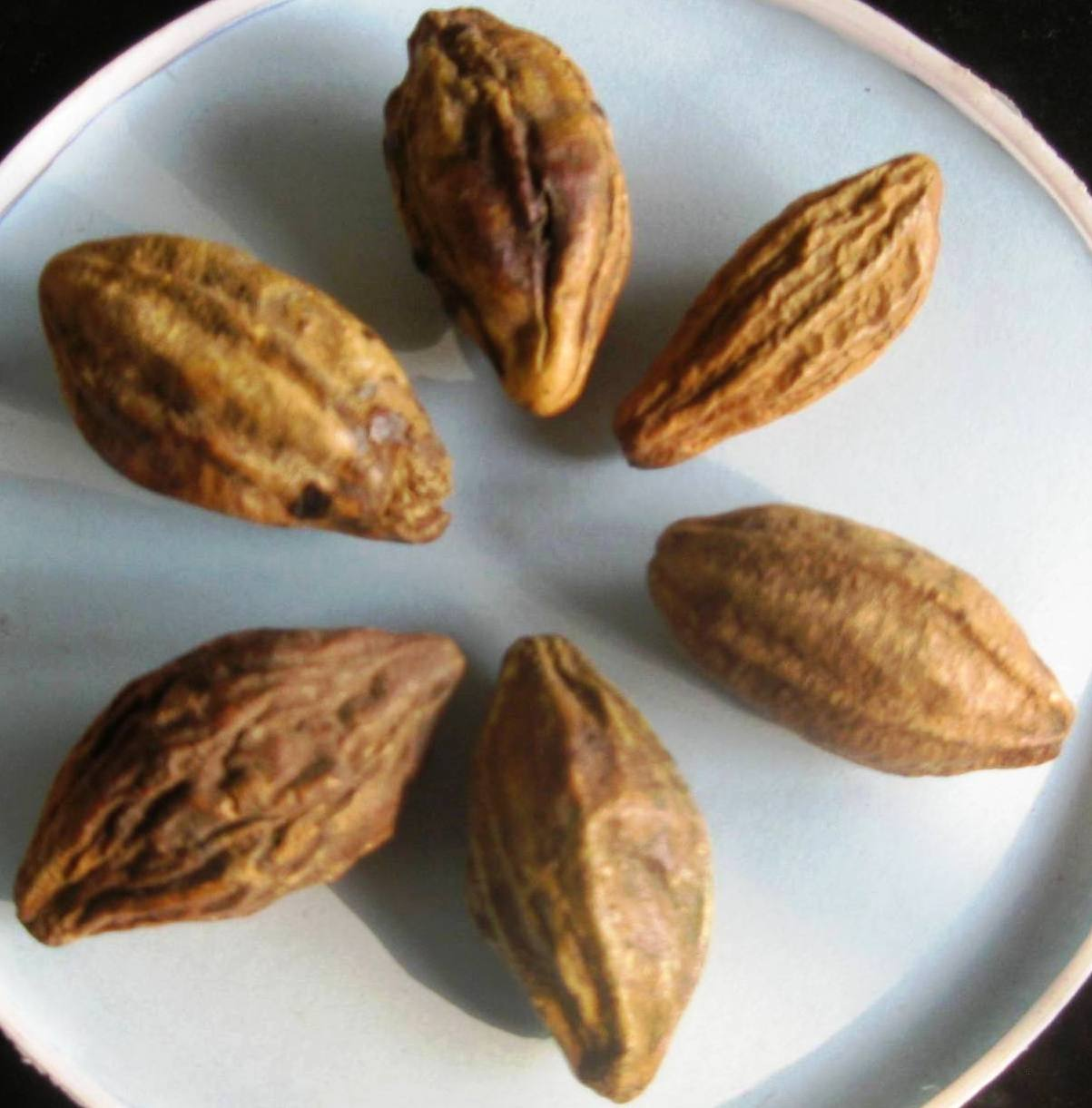
Dried fruit of Myrobalan (Haritaki)

The common name myrobalan can refer to several unrelated fruit-bearing plant species:

- Myrobalan plum (Prunus cerasifera), also called cherry plum and myrobalan plum
- Emblic myrobalan (Phyllanthus emblica), also called Amla and Amalaki

In the genus Terminalia:

- Beleric myrobalan (Terminalia bellirica), also called Bibhitaki and Belliric myrobalans
- Black myrobalan (Terminalia chebula), also called Haritaki and Chebulic myrobalans.

== See also ==
- Mirabelle
- Triphala
