= Wine preservatives =

Food preservation

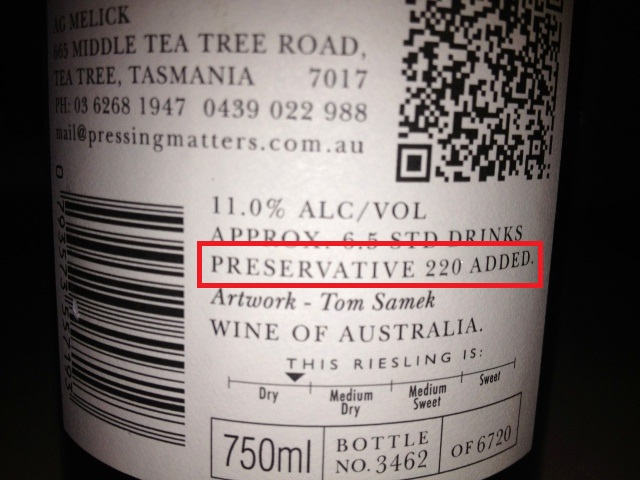
- Type: Additive
- Colour: Purple/transparent colour
- Flavour: Most are tasteless and a few, such as tannins, have a bitter taste
- Related products: Food preservative

Wine preservatives are used to preserve the quality and shelf life of bottled wine without affecting its taste. Specifically, they are used to prevent oxidation and bacterial spoilage by inhibiting microbial activity.

Wine contains natural preservatives such as tannin, sugar and alcohol, and can be preserved through physical preservation methods, such as storage at an appropriate temperature. However, bacterial growth is still possible, so chemical preservatives are added to most wines. Typical chemical preservatives include sulfur dioxide and its related chemicals, such as sulfites.

The use of preservatives in wine has been shown to cause health problems in some consumers.

== Deterioration ==
Despite the alcohol in wine, growth of bacteria is possible, even when completely fermented. Wine is made from the fermentation of grape juice, which contains sugar. During the fermentation process, yeast will convert sugar into alcohol. If the fermentation is not complete, the wine will contain residual sugar content. The sugar acts as nutrient needed for the growth of bacteria, which can deteriorate the wine or even turn it into grape vinegar. Because the alcohol content of wine is relatively low, the alcohol cannot completely inhibit the proliferation of bacteria. Long-term improper storage may accelerate deterioration.

During the brewing process, microbial spoilage can lead to the deterioration of wine quality and taste, making it unhygienic and unacceptable to consumers. The main bacterial groups are yeast, candida and Hanseniaspora. In addition, microbial diseases of wine are mainly caused by yeast, lactobacillus and acetic acid bacteria. This is because yeast may re-ferment a wine with high sugar content, making it cloudy and impure. Lactic acid bacteria can cause acid spoilage in dry wine with low acidity and lactic acid bacteria disease in sweet wine with low acidity. Acetic acid bacteria may cause the increase of volatile acid in wine, resulting in an undesirable sour vinegar taste. These fungi are all bad for the safety and flavor of wine.

== Preservatives ==
Anything that extends the shelf life of red wine is considered a preservative. Preservatives are mainly divided into natural preservatives and chemical preservatives.

=== Natural preservatives ===
==== Tannins ====
Tannins, also known as polyphenols, are found in the xylem, bark, leaves, fruits and roots of plants. Tannin molecules undergo polymerization to join into longer molecules and turn it into a "protective colloids" that prevents or limits aggregation, flocculation and step haze formation and precipitation. At the same time, tannins are also one of the main sources of bitterness and astringency in wines. Its content and quality are one of the important factors in evaluating the quality of red wine.

==== Sugar ====
Just as people use sugar or salt when making preserved foods, sugar is also a preservative for wine. The sugar lowers the water activity of the food, meaning that less water is available for the bacteria, stunting its growth. Salt is used as a preservative in the same way.

==== Alcohol ====
Alcohol is used as a preservative especially in spirits such as sherry. Because common alcohol can have the same problems as acid when used as preservatives, the lack of acidity does not play a role of maintaining quality.

=== Chemical preservatives ===
==== Acid ====
Acid is widely used as a preservative. In red wine, Sulfurous anhydride or sulfur dioxide (SO2), in particular, is the most frequently used source. Acid protects wine from bacteria by regulating the pH value, which affects the growth and vitality of yeast during fermentation. Acidity also directly affects color, balance and taste.

For example, sulfur dioxide, the most widely used preservative by wine merchants, has been used as a cleaning agent for centuries. Sulphur dioxide has a pungent taste that people dislike, and its use has been controversial because of its disease-causing properties (see section on the controversy).

Sorbic acid, which acts like sulfites, has recently been approved for use in European Community countries, but only under very limited conditions. It must be effective in wines with an alcohol concentration of 12%.

Apart from sulfur dioxide, which is used most frequently, other chemicals such as benzoic acid, diethyl pyrocarbonate, parabens, pimaricin and sorbic acid are also used as preservatives in wine, but the potential threat or side effects of these chemicals are still to be investigated, so they are not permitted to be used in large quantities for the time being.

==== Weak acid ====
Compared with other preservatives, weak acids are characterized by their antiseptic effect by slowing down the growth and reproduction cycle of microorganisms rather than killing them. Weak acids inhibit microbial growth by dissociating protons from cells. Although the chemical formula of different weak acids is different, they all play a more obvious inhibitory effect in the environment with a low pH value; that is, the more acidic the environment, the greater the inhibitory effect. This practice was first discovered by John Evelyn in 1670, who used sulfur dioxide from burning sulfur to preserve cider.

==== Tartaric acid ====
In hot climates, tartaric acid is added when grapes become too ripe for natural acidity. Most people agree that grapes should be picked when there is a balance between optimum ripeness and acidity, and there are many factors that can reduce the acidity of the wine-making process. Acidification is widespread in Argentina, Australia, California, Washington, Italy and South Africa. It is not common in northern France, Germany, Austria, Oregon and New Zealand.

==== Calcium carbonate ====
In contrast to tartaric acid, if the grapes are too acidic, calcium carbonate is used to bring them down to the level needed to make wine.

In addition, many also use oak, oak slices, fermentation agents, tutu, and more, according to the quality of grapes and the different styles of wine. The need for additives and the amount used depends on the winemaker, as different winemakers make different choices.

== The basic principle of preservatives against oxidation ==
Wine has different preservatives from other drinks such as milk, juice and beer. Its preservatives work primarily by inhibiting the growth of microorganisms through oxidation. However, because different kinds of wine have different aromas, colors and flavors, they should not use the same preservatives. For example, the preservatives added to white wine are mainly ascorbic acid (vitamin C) and sorbic acid. Ascorbic acid is used as an antioxidant, while sorbic acid is used to inhibit the growth of yeast in white wine. Sorbic acid cannot be used in red wine because it can cause pollution. Sulfites, or small molecules of sulfur dioxide (SO_{2}) and hydrogen disulfide (H_{2}O_{2}), are commonly used as preservatives in wine and even other fruit drinks. Their principle is basically to make microbial protein coagulation or denaturation, thereby interfering with their growth and reproduction. Sulfites are mainly in the form of sulfur dioxide at different pH concentrations. Experiments show that only the sulfur dioxide molecule has an antibacterial effect. That's the active ingredient in preservatives. Sulfur dioxide inactivates by combining with compounds derived from wine. Because of the nature of sulfur dioxide, it is more effective at lower pH concentrations and at higher ethanol concentrations, finally achieving the function of anti-corrosion.

== Preservatives controversy ==
Allergy to preservatives has aroused people's concern. Studies have shown that a possible cause of allergy in wine ingredients is an adverse reaction to sulfur dioxide by asthma patients. Sulfur dioxide allergy was the cause of 1.7% of asthma patients. It is not precisely a true statement that a person is allergic to preservatives, but rather, the person may be allergic to preservatives that contain sulfur dioxide. The controversy over preservatives has not entirely disappeared, but sulfur dioxide is still the most widely used preservative in wine at this stage because it is effective and no alternative chemical additive has been found.

People are concerned about their health and have higher requirements for food quality. Because of the controversy, disease-causing preservatives have been used as sparingly as possible or clearly labeled on wine bottles to make it easier for people with the disease to stay informed. Meanwhile, people are increasingly looking for safe and healthy wine preservatives.

In addition to traditional preservation methods that do not require preservatives, such as cryopreservation, it is evident that there are many new technologies, such as high hydrostatic pressure (HHP) and pulsed electric fields (PFF) that can also play a beneficial role in food preservation. Whether these new technologies can replace chemical preservatives is worth considering. In addition, researchers have targeted potential biological preservatives, such as antimicrobial peptides and bacteriolytic enzymes. There is still a lot of research space for biological preservatives, which is relatively safe and has certain benefits.

== Known health effects due to preservatives ==
It has been reported that many food preservatives, including sorbitan, hydrogen peroxide, benzoic acid and sodium benzoate, can cause health problems, especially in high doses. In addition, as mentioned in the controversy section, the adverse effects of sulfites on asthma patients also confirmed the health threat of preservatives containing this substance. In the meantime, sulfite accumulates can decompose sulfur dioxide and also have certain stimulation to lungs. Therefore, some people are urging that sulfur dioxide be banned as a preservative and food additive, in wine and other food and beverages.

Propionic acid, which is also used as a preservative, has also been shown to be carcinogenic in rodents. However, there are currently only two ways to minimize the health threat of sulfur dioxide. One is to try to reduce the dose of sulfur dioxide, which is already happening. The second is to study the chemical structure and characteristics of sulfur dioxide, looking for alternative chemical preservatives. This requires a lot of scientific research efforts and has not seen effective results in a short time.

Experts studying wine preservatives have discovered that a specific type of wine yeast can be made using the substances secreted by yeast during fermentation as new biological preservatives may reduce the threat of wine preservatives to life and health. But the possibility of adding antibacterial compounds to the manufacturing process may prevent the risk from being completely avoided, so the study is ongoing.

== See also ==
- Food preservation
