= Port tongs =

Tongs to cleanly break off a bottleneck when the cork cannot be removed

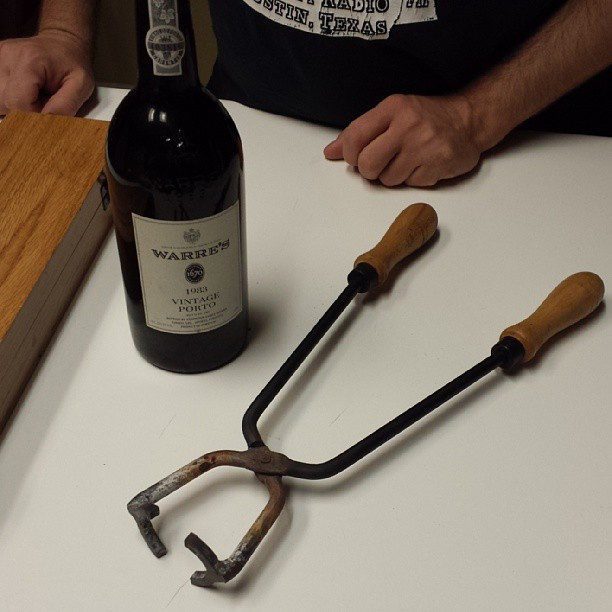
Port tongs alongside a bottle of Port wine.

Port tongs (Portuguese: Tenaz) are a special set of tongs designed to open wine bottles that are sealed with a cork. The tongs are heated over an open flame and held against the neck of the wine bottle for 20–30 seconds. The heated section of bottle is then cooled with a damp cloth or ice water, causing the glass to fracture due to thermal expansion. The result is generally a clean, predictable break. Any possible shards of glass are strained out, along with any sediment, when pouring the wine into a decanter.

The tongs are intended for use when the cork cannot be removed with a normal corkscrew, such as old corks that would break apart and crumble into the wine. This is more common for high-alcohol fortified wines, such as port: the alcohol acts as a natural preservative, allowing the wine to be aged for decades. The tongs can be used for any type of bottle, but are generally uncommon. Outside of Portugal, they are typically only found in very well-equipped, high-end establishments.

Port tongs were invented in the region of Douro.

== See also ==
- Sabrage
- Wine accessory
