= Red Fort Archaeological Museum =

Museum in Delhi, India

Coordinates: 28.654494°N 77.243445°E

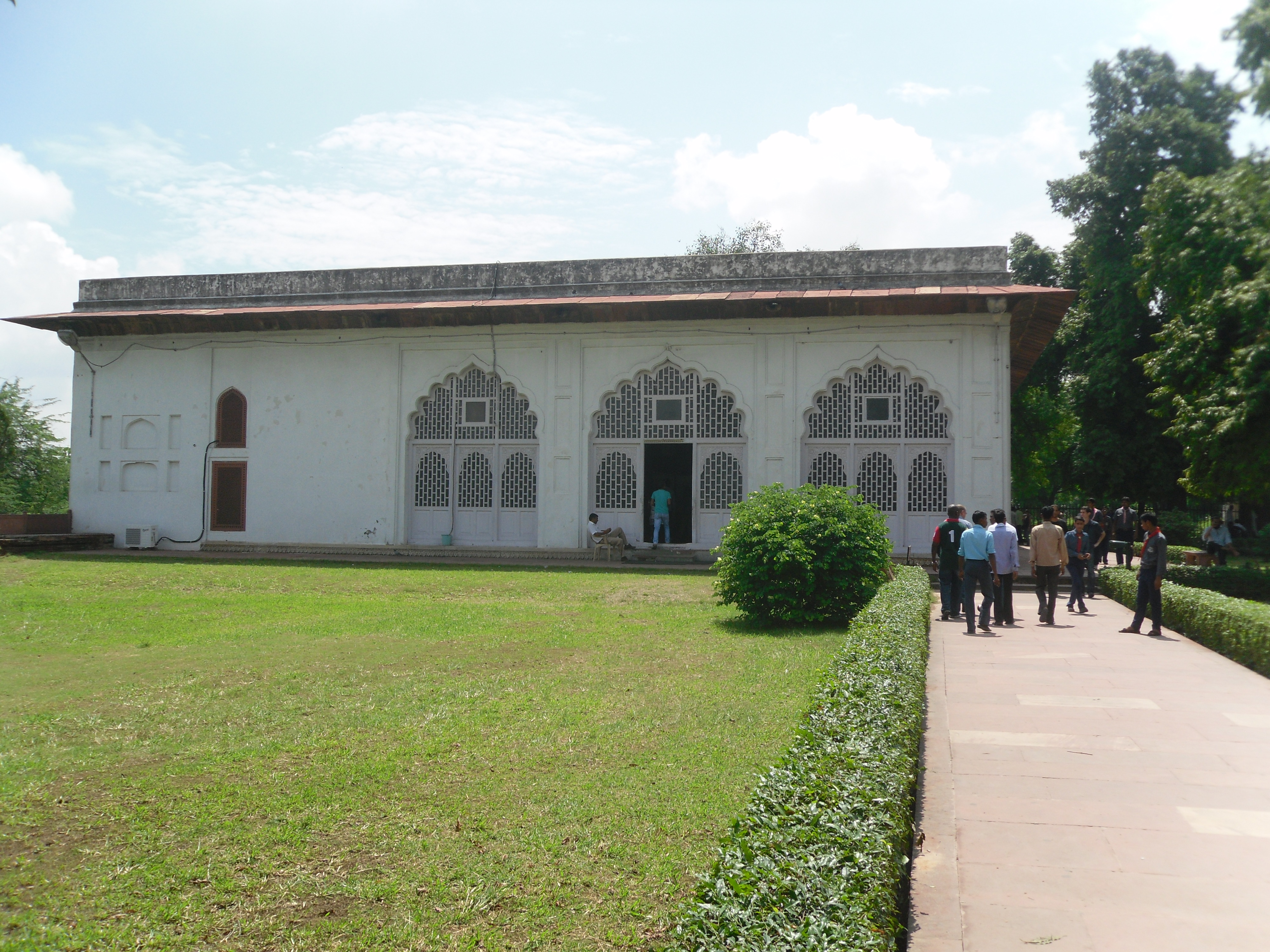
The Red Fort Archaeology Museum is currently housed in the Mumtaz Mahal

The Red Fort Archaeological Museum is currently located in the Mumtaz Mahal of the Red Fort in Old Delhi, northern India. The museum contains paintings, artifacts, calligraphy, fabrics and other objects dating from the Mughal era.

== History ==
Originally known as the Palace Museum, this museum dates back to 1911 when it was located in the Naubhat Khana. It was later moved to the Mumtaz Mahal, originally used as a mess by British troops. The museum is now under the aegis of the Archaeological Survey of India.

Most of the Mughal belongings and jewels of the Red Fort were looted and stolen during Nadir Shah's invasion of India in 1747 and again after the failed Indian Rebellion of 1857 against the British. They were eventually sold to private collectors or the British Museum, British Library and the Victoria and Albert Museum. For example, the Koh-i-Noor diamond, the jade wine cup of Shah Jahan and the crown of Bahadur Shah II are all currently located in London. Various requests for restitution have been rejected by the British government. The museum, therefore, is only able to show a very small fraction of Mughal property and heritage.
