= Mumtaz Mahal (disambiguation) =

Mumtaz Mahal (1593–1631) was the wife of Shah Jahan, an emperor of the Mughal Empire.

Mumtaz Mahal may also refer to:

- Mumtaz Mahal (Red Fort), in Dehli, India
- Mumtaz Mahal (horse) (1921–1945), Thoroughbred racehorse and broodmare
- Mumtaz Mahal (film), a 1944 Hindi film
- Mumtaz Mahal (album), a 1995 album by Taj Mahal, N. Ravikiran and Vishwa Mohan Bhatt
