= Enocyanin =

Colorant

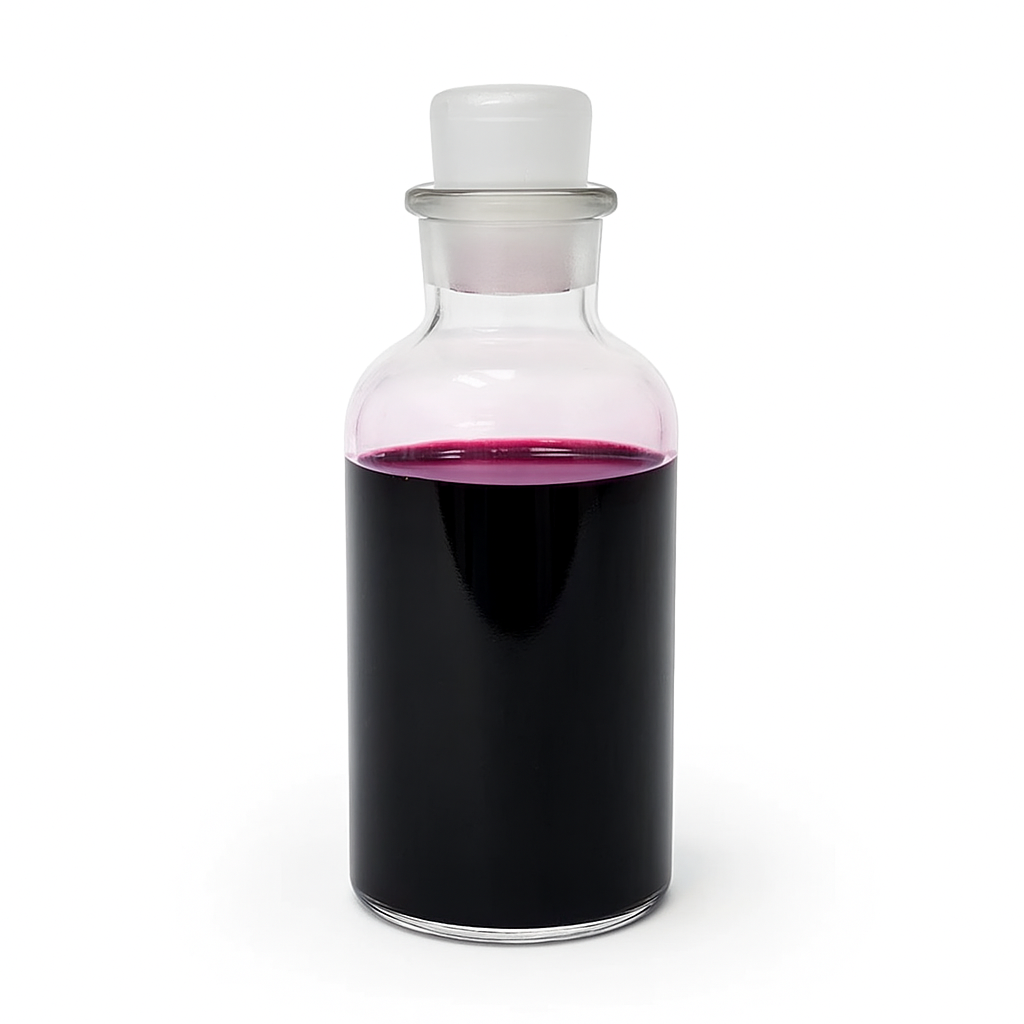
Enocyanin extracted from red wine grape peels

Enocyanin is a natural colorant extracted from the peels of black grapes (primarily Vitis vinifera). It is a mixture composed primarily of anthocyanins, particularly malvidin-3-glucoside (C_{23}H_{25}O_{12}^{+}). It is part of the water-soluble pigments belonging to the flavonoid class.

== Chemical-physical characteristics ==
It is a dense red-violet liquid, but the color can vary based on the pH of the environment (reddish in an acidic environment, bluish in a basic environment). Chemically, enocyanin is a mixture of mono and dimethyl compounds of multiple anthocyanidins, it is soluble in hydroalcoholic solutions and insoluble in lipid solvents. The substance is listed together with other anthocyanins among food additives with the acronym "E163" (grape skin extract) and is marketed in the form of a dark red-purple powder to be dissolved in water or directly liquid. It is extracted from by-products of red winemaking (e.g. grape marc) and must be stored in a protected environment, preferably in the dark and away from heat sources. It fears humidity, oxidation and photodegradation, which transform it into insoluble brownish compounds typically found in poorly stored red wines.

== History and production ==
Its industrial production was developed in Italy by Antonio Carpenè in collaboration with Enrico Comboni. Originally it was separated directly from the red wine (in which it is present for approximately 1% of the total) by precipitating it with basic lead acetate and obtaining a dark blue substance. Today, enocyanin is obtained from the peels of black grapes rich in anthocyanins (Italian cultivars "Ancellotta", "Colorino", "Sangiovese", "Lambrusco") by extraction in acidified water (often with citric or tartaric acid) at medium temperature (30–50°C) so as not to degrade the anthocyanins, sometimes with the addition of food-grade ethanol to improve yield and conservation. After separating the solids (seeds, fibers, and spent peels) using pressure filters or centrifugation, the extract is purified using ion exchange resins or membrane filtration, concentrated under low-temperature vacuum to preserve thermolabile compounds, and, if necessary, transformed into a powder through freeze-drying or spray-drying. The final product is stabilized with natural antioxidants and packaged in dark, airtight containers, often under an inert atmosphere. Classified as E163, enocyanin is used in the winemaking industry as a color enhancer and in the food and cosmetic industries for its intense pigmentation, excellent color stability in acidic environments, and its natural origin based on the recovery of winemaking byproducts. The starting pomace must be fresh and free of sulfur dioxide or other additives that could interfere with the extraction process.

== See also ==
- Anthocyanin
- Phenolic compounds in wine
