= Ice bucket =

Ice bucket may refer to:

- Ice Bucket Challenge, an activity involving dumping a bucket of ice water on one's head
- a type of wine cooler
