= Dregs =

Dregs may refer to:

- Dregs (film), a 2017 Iranian film
- Sediment in wine, beer, coffee or other beverage
- "Dregs of Humanity", an episode of the It's Your Move TV series
- Audio Dregs, an independent music label
- Dixie Dregs (a.k.a. The Dregs), an American rock band
- Mass of the Fermenting Dregs, a post-rock/shoegaze trio formed in Kobe, Japan in 2002
- The Dregs, a fictional gang in Leigh Bardugo’s Six of Crows duology

== See also ==
- D'regs, a nomadic and warlike people who inhabit the desert regions of hubward Klatch in the Discworld series
