= Wine color =

Wine characteristic

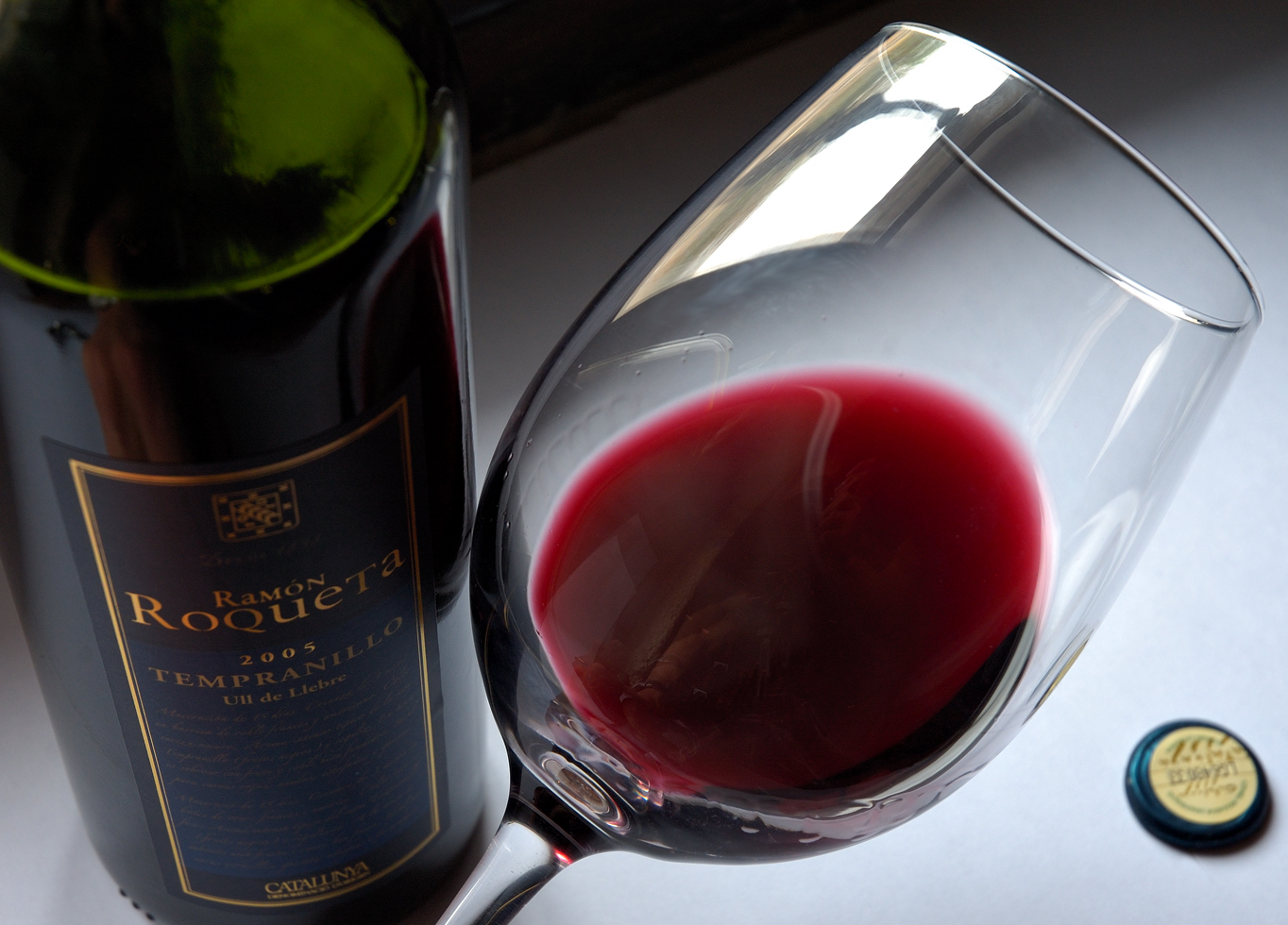
Judging color is the first step in tasting a wine.

The color of wine is one of the most easily recognizable characteristics of wines. Color is also an element in wine tasting since heavy wines generally have a deeper color. The accessory traditionally used to judge the wine color was the tastevin, a shallow cup allowing one to see the color of the liquid in the dim light of a cellar. The color is an element in the classification of wines.

== Color origins ==
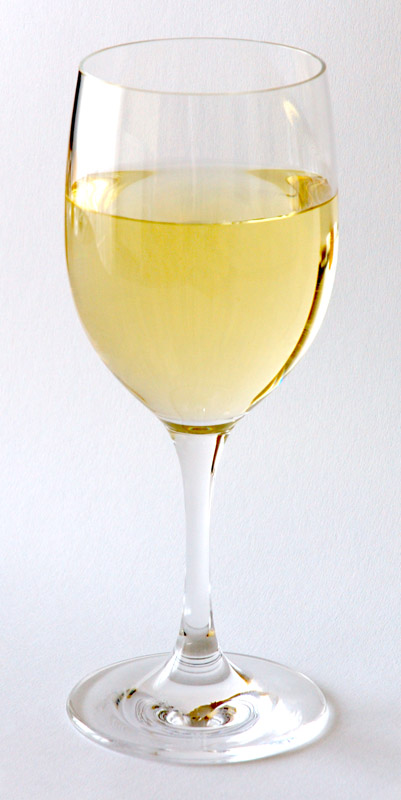
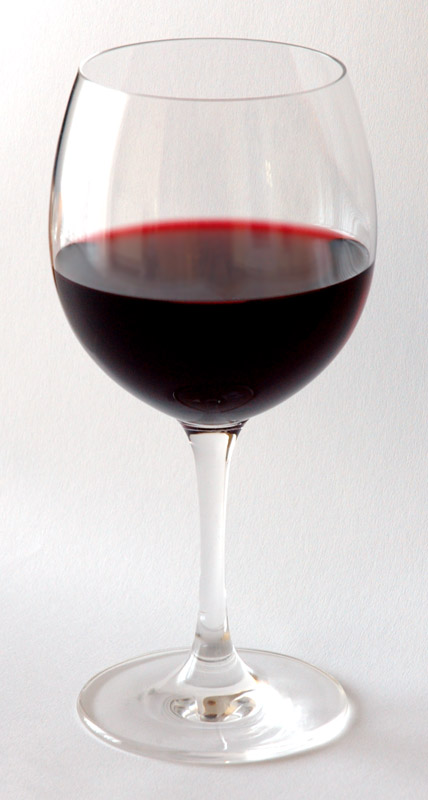
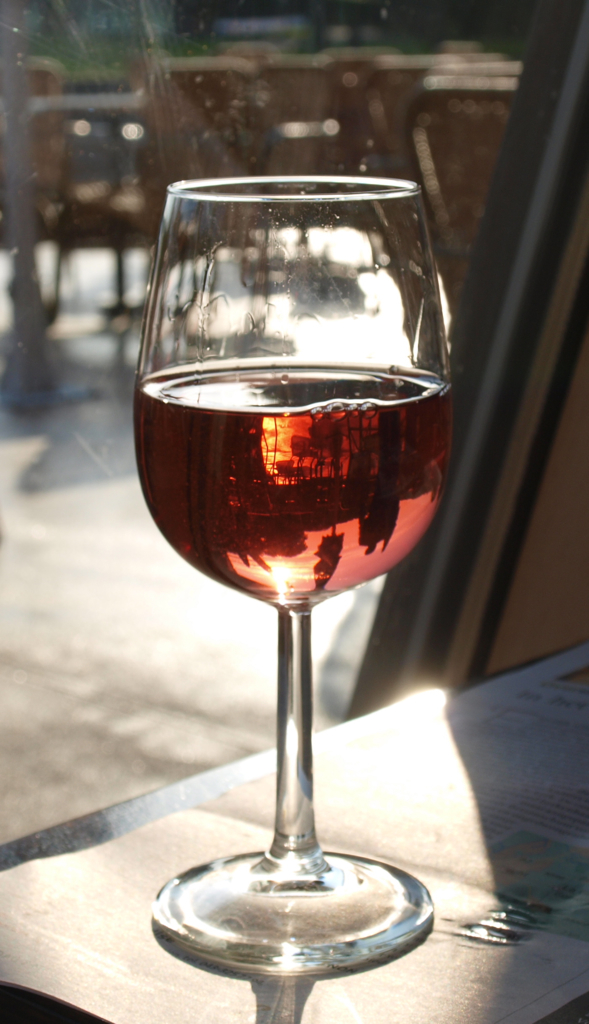
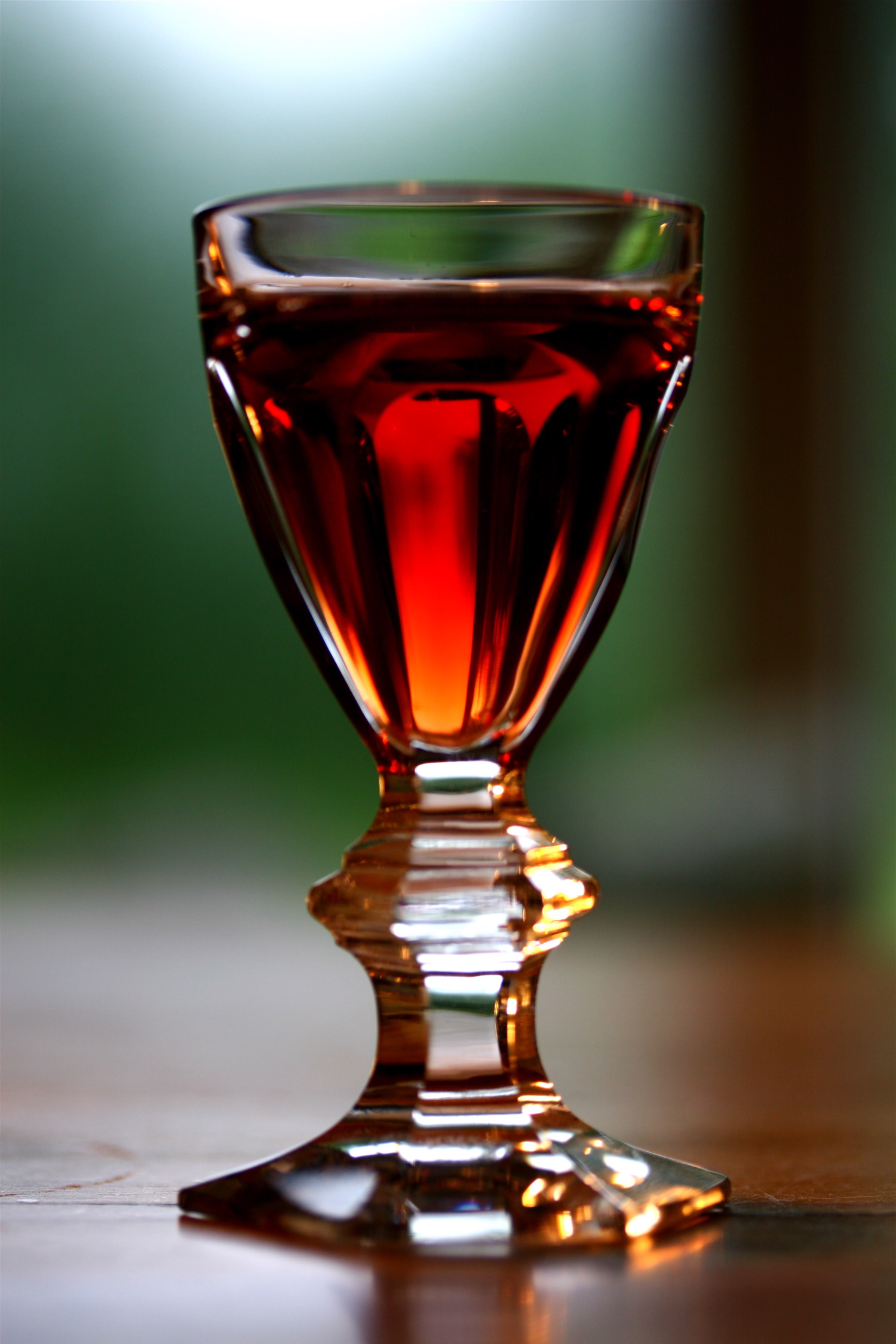
Four glasses of wine (from left to right): white, red, rosé and aged port wine

The color of the wine mainly depends on the color of the drupe of the grape variety. Since pigments are localized in the center of the grape drupe, not in the juice, the color of the wine depends on the method of vinification and the time the must is in contact with those skins, a process called maceration. The Teinturier grape is an exception in that it also has a pigmented pulp. The blending of two or more varieties of grapes can explain the color of certain wines, like the addition of Rubired to intensify redness.

Red drupe grapes can produce white wine if they are quickly pressed and the juice not allowed to be in contact with the skins. The color is mainly due to plant pigments, notably phenolic compounds (anthocyanidins, tannins, etc.). The color depends on the presence of acids in the wine. It is altered with wine aging by reactions between different active molecules present in the wine, these reactions generally giving rise to a browning of the wine, leading from red to a more tawny color. The use of a wooden barrel (generally oak barrels) in aging also affects the color of the wine.

The color of a wine can be partly due to co-pigmentation of anthocyanidins with other non-pigmented flavonoids or natural phenols (cofactors or "copigments").

Rosé wine is commonly made by the practice of short maceration (exposing wine to red grape skins for only a short period of time in order to give it a lighter feel closer to that of white wine) or by blending a white wine with a red wine.

== Color evolution ==
The presence of a complex mixture of anthocyanins and procyanidins can increase the stability of color in wine.

As it ages, the wine undergoes chemical autoxidation reactions involving acetaldehyde of its pigment molecules. The newly formed molecules are more stable to the effect of pH or sulfite bleaching. The new compounds include pyranoanthocyanins like vitisins (A and B), pinotins and portosins and other polymeric derived pigments.

Malvidin glucoside-ethyl-catechin is a flavanol-anthocyanin adduct. Flavanol-anthocyanin adducts are formed during wine ageing through reactions between anthocyanins and tannins present in grape, with yeast metabolites such as acetaldehyde. Acetaldehyde-induced reactions yield ethyl-linked species such as malvidin glucoside-ethyl-catechin. This compound has a better color stability at pH 5.5 than malvidin-3O-glucoside. When the pH was increased from 2.2 to 5.5, the solution of the pigment became progressively more violet (λ_{max} = 560 nm at pH 5.5), whereas similar solutions of the anthocyanin were almost colorless at pH 4.0.

The exposure of wine to oxygen in limited quantities can be beneficial to the wine. It affects color.

Castavinols are another class of colorless molecules derived from colored anthocyanin pigments.

Structure of compound NJ2, a xanthylium pigment found in wine

In model solutions, colorless compounds, such as catechin, can give rise to new types of pigments. The first step is the formation of colorless dimeric compounds consisting of two flavanol units linked by carboxy-methine bridge. This is followed by the formation of xanthylium salt yellowish pigments and their ethylesters, resulting from the dehydration of the colorless dimers, followed by an oxidation process. The loss of a water molecule takes place between two A ring hydroxyl groups of the colorless dimers.

== Colors ==
The main colors of wine are:

- Gray, as in vin gris (gray wine).
- Orange, as in Orange wine, a white wine that has spent some time in contact with its skin, giving it a slightly darker hue.
- Red wine (although this is a general term for dark wines, whose color can be as far from "red" as bluish-violet)
- Rosé (meaning pinkish in French)
- Tawny, as in tawny port.
- White wine (light colored wine)
- Yellow (or straw color), see for instance vin jaune, a special and characteristic type of white wine made in the Jura wine region in eastern France, Jurançon or Sauternes.

Other:

- Wine red
  - Burgundy, a shade of purplish red
- Sangria, a color that resembles Sangría wine
- Ox blood, probably referring to ancient practice of fining red wines with dry powdered blood
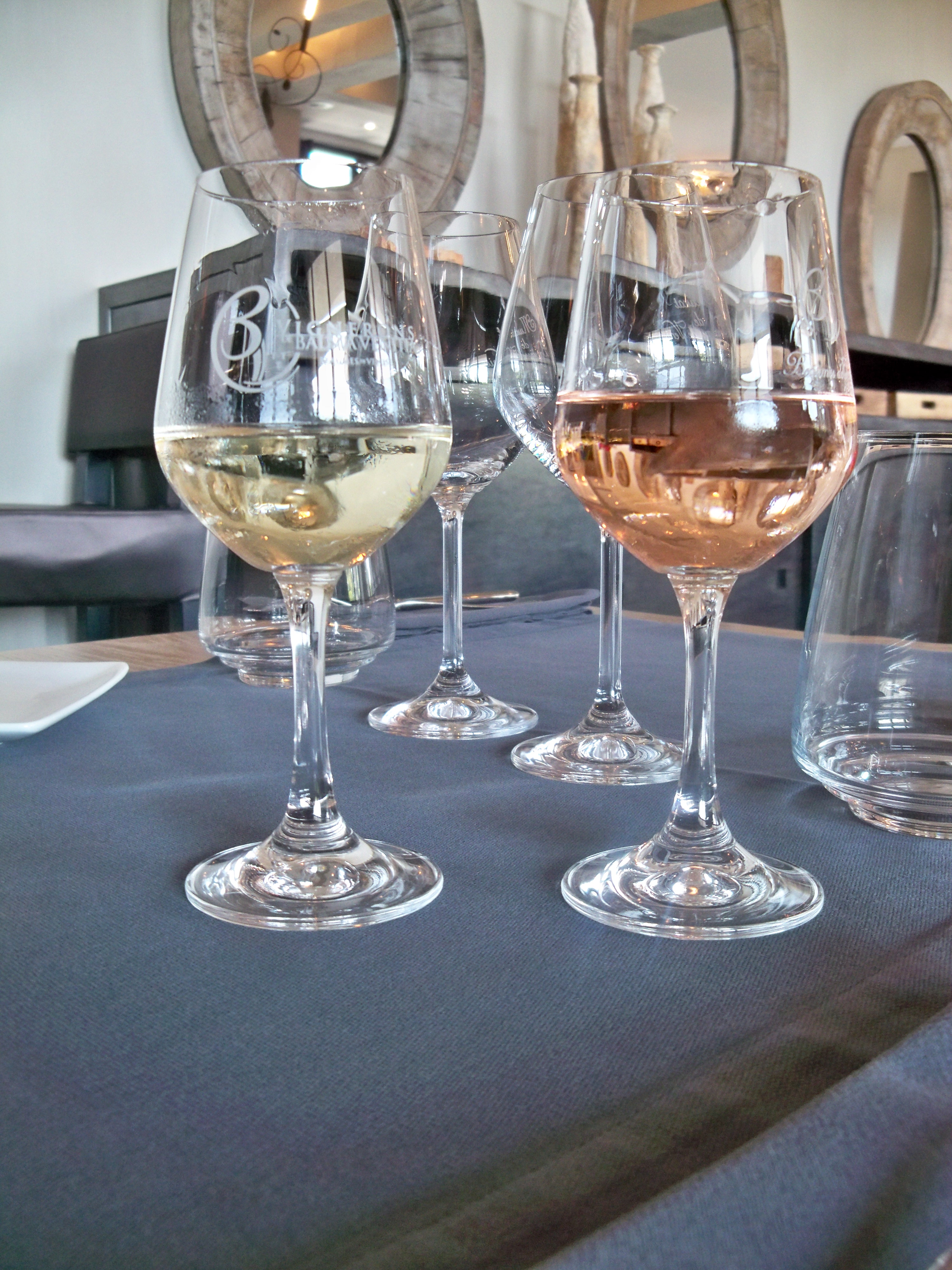
Glasses of Beaumes de Venise white and rosé

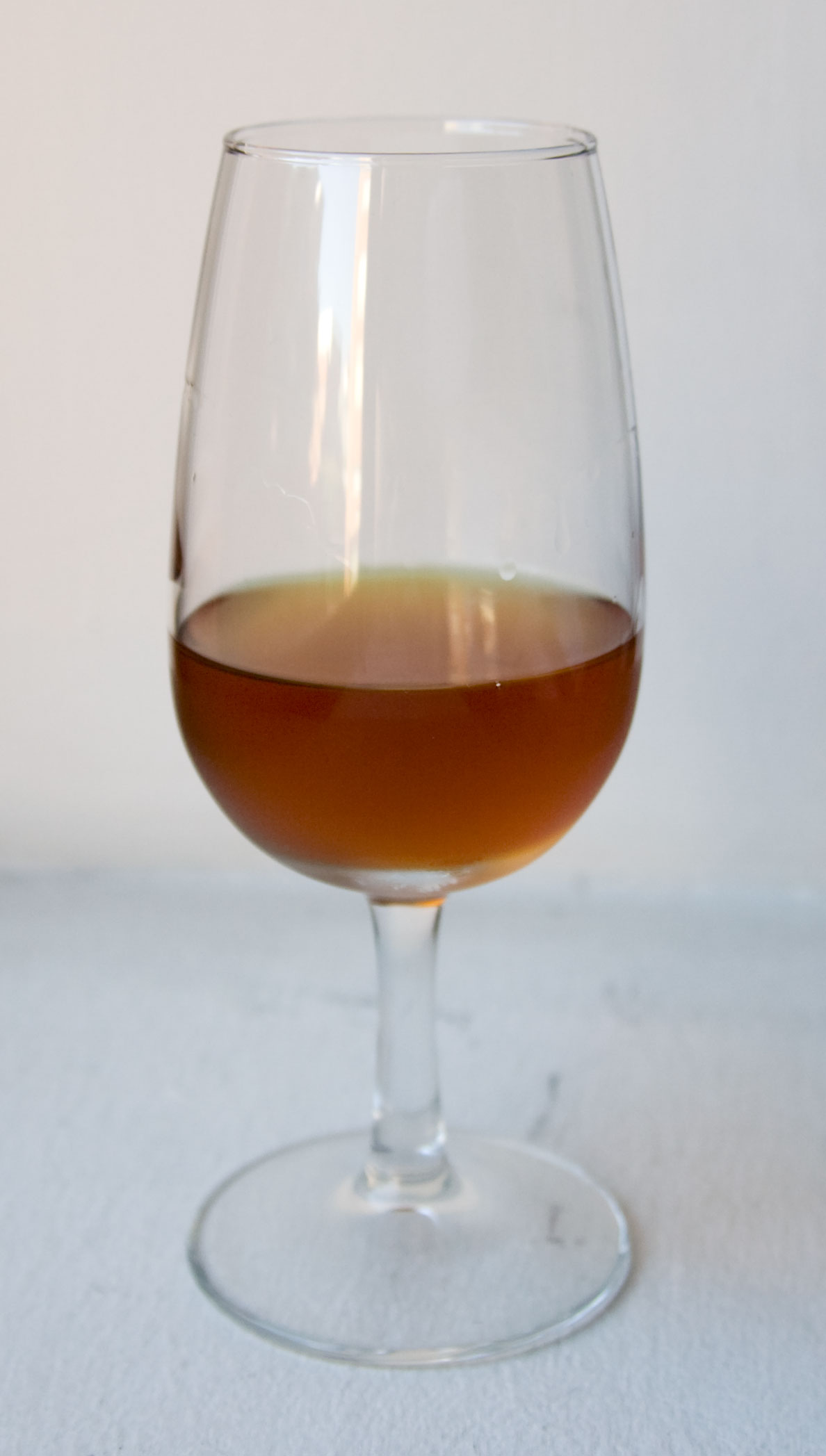
Glass of Amontillado sherry

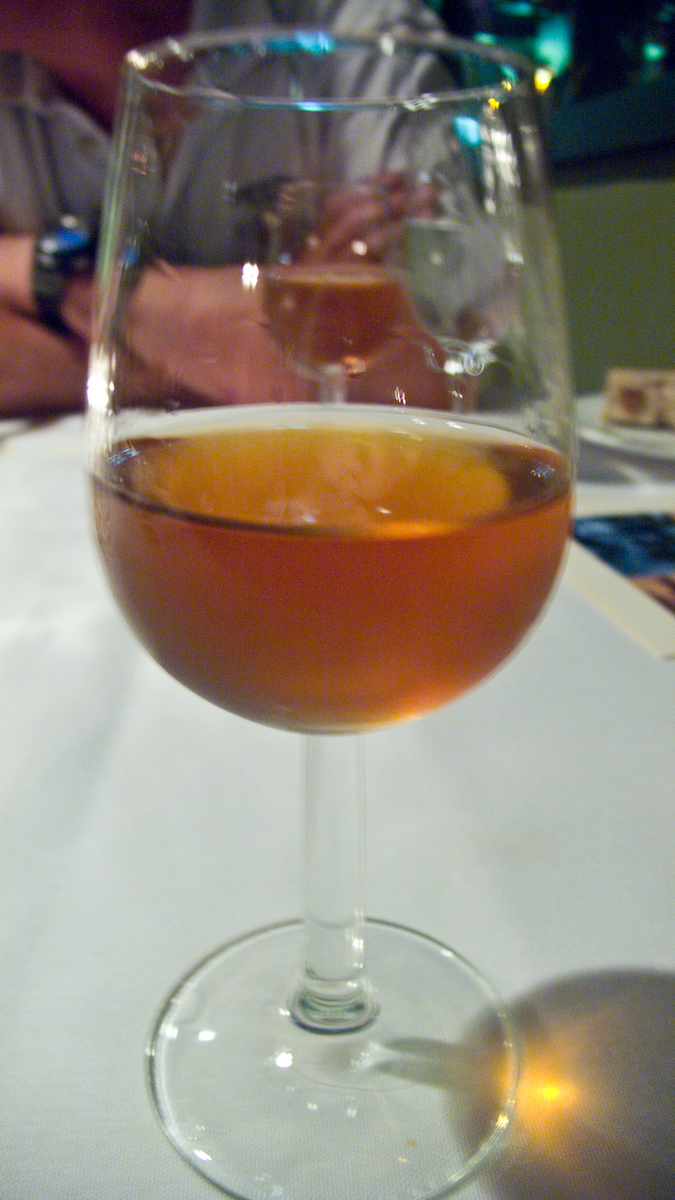
A glass of Vin Santo with its characteristic amber color

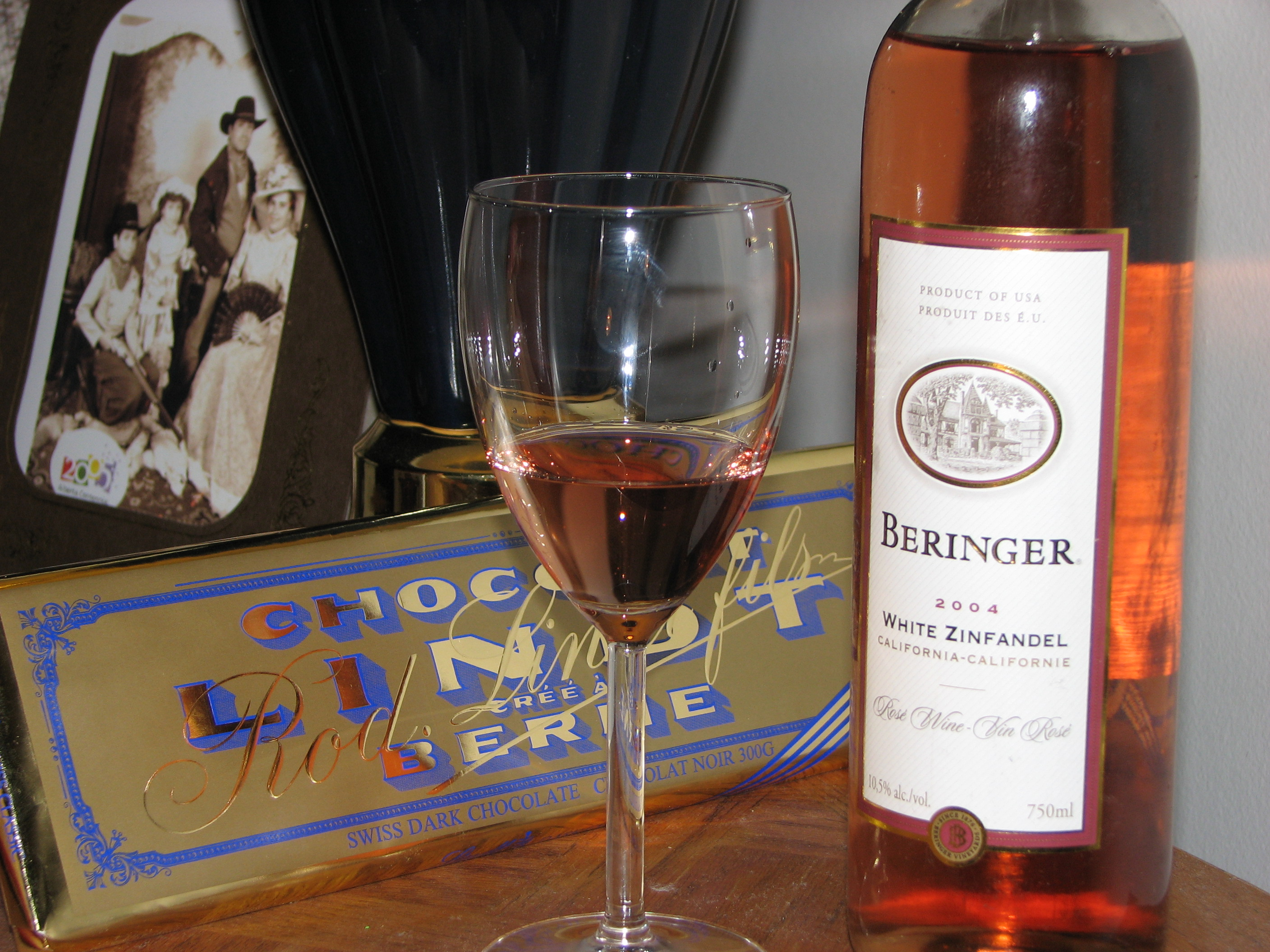
Beringer White Zinfandel

== Scientific color determination ==
The International Organisation of Vine and Wine (OIV) provides methods to assess the color of a wine using a spectrophotometer and the calculation of indices in the Lab color space.

== See also ==
- Glossary of winemaking terms
- Wine (color) or burgundy (color), the color of red wine
