= NJ2 =

NJ2 may refer to:

- Compound NJ2, a xanthylium yellowish pigment found in wine
- China Railways NJ2, a class of diesel-electric locomotives employed by China Railways
- New Jersey's 2nd congressional district
