= Malvidin glucoside-ethyl-catechin =

Names
- Preferred IUPAC name 8-{(1Ξ)-1-[(2R*,3S*)-2-(3,4-Dihydroxyphenyl)-3,5,7-trihydroxy-3,4-dihydro-2H-1-benzopyran-8-yl]ethyl}-5,7-dihydroxy-2-(4-hydroxy-3,5-dimethoxyphenyl)-3-{[(2S,3R,4S,5S,6R)-3,4,5-trihydroxy-6-(hydroxymethyl)oxan-2-yl]oxy}-1λ^{4}-benzopyran-1-ylium
- Other names 8,8-linked malvidin-3-glucose-ethyl-(epi)catechin

Identifiers
3D model (JSmol)	Interactive image
ChemSpider	7987342
PubChem CID	9811587
CompTox Dashboard (EPA)	DTXSID001030412
- InChI: InChI=1S/C40H40O18/c1-14(30-23(46)11-20(43)17-9-25(48)36(57-38(17)30)15-4-5-19(42)22(45)6-15)31-24(47)12-21(44)18-10-28(55-40-35(52)34(51)33(50)29(13-41)56-40)37(58-39(18)31)16-7-26(53-2)32(49)27(8-16)54-3/h4-8,10-12,14,25,29,33-36,40-41,48,50-52H,9,13H2,1-3H3,(H6-,42,43,44,45,46,47,49)/p+1/t14?,25?,29-,33-,34+,35-,36?,40-/m1/s1 Key: OWEZHPRMUFSMFC-OGEOSVLCSA-O
- SMILES: CC(c1c2[o+]c(c(cc2c(O)cc1O)O[C@@H]1O[C@H](CO)[C@@H](O)[C@H](O)[C@H]1O)-c1cc(OC)c(O)c(c1)OC)c1c2OC(C(O)Cc2c(O)cc1O)c1cc(O)c(O)cc1

Properties
Chemical formula	C_{40<}H_{40}O_{18}^{+}
Molar mass	809.75 g/mol
- Except where otherwise noted, data are given for materials in their standard state (at 25 °C [77 °F], 100 kPa). Infobox references

Malvidin glucoside-ethyl-catechin is a flavanol-anthocyanin adduct. Flavanol-anthocyanin adducts are formed during wine ageing through reactions between anthocyanins and tannins present in grape, with yeast metabolites such as acetaldehyde. Acetaldehyde-induced reactions yield ethyl-linked species such as malvidin glucoside-ethyl-catechin.

This compound has a better color stability at pH 5.5 than malvidin-3O-glucoside. When the pH was increased from 2.2 to 5.5, the solution of the pigment became progressively more violet (λmax = 560 nm at pH 5.5), whereas similar solutions of the anthocyanin were almost colorless at pH 4.0.

Other types of aldehyde, such as isovaleraldehyde, benzaldehyde, propionaldehyde, isobutyraldehyde, formaldehyde or 2-methylbutyraldehyde, show the same reactivity in model solutions.

== See also ==
- Phenolic content in wine
- Wine color
