= Antonio Carpenè =

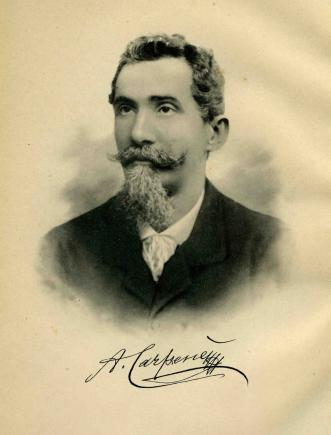
- Antonio Carpenè
- Born: August 17, 1838; Brugnera
- Died: March 23, 1902 (aged 63); Conegliano
- Occupation(s): Chemist, oenologist

Antonio Carpenè (Brugnera, August 17, 1838 – Conegliano, March 23, 1902) was an Italian chemist and oenologist.

== Biography ==
Antonio Carpenè focused on studies related to viticulture and oenology, with a particular focus on sparkling wine production techniques. In 1879, he developed the industrial production of enocyanin (an anthocyanin extracted from grapes) in collaboration with Enrico Comboni.

As a follower of Giuseppe Mazzini, he participated in some important battles of the Italian Risorgimento. As a scientist, he had contact with Robert Koch and Louis Pasteur regarding research on the effects of sulfur dioxide on wine and beer fermentation.

Carpenè worked to overcome agricultural backwardness and modernize the outdated vine cultivation systems prevalent in Italy at the time. He contributed to the establishment of the Conegliano School of Oenology (Scuola enologica di Conegliano), the first oenological school in Italy. He is also a founder of Carpenè Malvolti.

The municipalities of Conegliano and Brugnera have named streets after him. He is buried in the cemetery of Conegliano.

== Works ==
- 1867 – Theoretical and Practical Notions of Viticulture and Winemaking, Treviso.
- 1874 – On Wine Containers and the Best Methods of Preservation, Milan.
- 1874 – Wine in the Province of Treviso, Turin.
- 1876 – Remarks on Sulfurous Compounds for Wine Preservation, Milan.
- 1878 – Theoretical-Practical Summary of Oenology and Winemaking, Turin.
- 1889 – On a New Method for Determining Alcohol in Wines and Other Alcoholic Liquids, Conegliano.
