= Anthocyanone A =

Names
- IUPAC name [(2S,3R,4S,5S,6R)-3,4,5-trihydroxy-6-(hydroxymethyl)oxan-2-yl] 2-(2,6-dihydroxy-4-oxocyclohexa-2,5-dien-1-ylidene)acetate
- Other names 8-β-d-glucopyranosyl-2,4-dihydroxy-6-oxo-cyclohexa-2,4-dienyl acetic acid

Identifiers
3D model (JSmol)	Interactive image
ChemSpider	29784776
PubChem CID	139031050
CompTox Dashboard (EPA)	DTXSID201045376
- InChI: InChI=1S/C14H16O10/c15-4-9-11(20)12(21)13(22)14(23-9)24-10(19)3-6-7(17)1-5(16)2-8(6)18/h1-3,9,11-17,20-22H,4H2/b6-3+/t9-,11-,12+,13-,14+/m1/s1 Key: VOWKJMFKRCLSJJ-BFYJNFCASA-N; InChI=1/C14H16O10/c15-4-9-11(20)12(21)13(22)14(23-9)24-10(19)3-6-7(17)1-5(16)2-8(6)18/h1-3,9,11-17,20-22H,4H2/b6-3+/t9-,11-,12+,13-,14+/m1/s1 Key: VOWKJMFKRCLSJJ-BFYJNFCABS
- SMILES: C1=C(C=C(/C(=C\C(=O)O[C@H]2[C@@H]([C@H]([C@@H]([C@H](O2)CO)O)O)O)/C1=O)O)O

Properties
Chemical formula	C_{14}H_{16}O_{10}
Molar mass	344.272 g·mol^{−1}
- Except where otherwise noted, data are given for materials in their standard state (at 25 °C [77 °F], 100 kPa). Infobox references

Anthocyanone A is a degradation product of malvidin 3-O-glucoside under acidic conditions. It is found in wine.
