= Castavinol =

Natural phenolic compounds found in red wines

Chemical structure of castavinols, where R = H, OH, or OCH_{3}

Castavinols are natural phenolic compounds found in red wines. These molecules are colorless and are derived from anthocyanin pigments. Thus their formation leads to a wine color loss.

== Known molecules ==
- Castavinol C1
- Castavinol C2
- Castavinol C3
- Castavinol C4
