= Coravin =

Company that manufactures products for the wine industry

Coravin, Inc.
- Type: Private
- Industry: Wine accessories
- Founded: 2011; 15 years ago
- Founder: Greg Lambrecht
- Headquarters: Bedford, Massachusetts, United States
- Products: wine by-the-glass system
- Website: www.coravin.com

Coravin, Inc. is a company based in Bedford, Massachusetts, that manufactures products for the wine industry. Its first product, the Coravin wine by-the-glass system, allows wine to be poured without removing the cork from the bottle.

== History ==
The opener was invented by Greg Lambrecht, who founded Coravin in 2011 with Josh Makower. Nick Lazaris, the former CEO of Keurig, joined as CEO in 2013 and was succeeded in February 2015 by Frederic Levy.

In February 2024, Dave Krupinski, previously the company’s COO and CTO, was appointed Chief Executive Officer.

== Coravin wine by-the-glass system ==
The Coravin wine by-the-glass system uses a hollowed needle, which is inserted through the cork and fills the bottle with argon gas to pressurize it, and the wine, in turn, is poured through the needle. When the needle is removed from the cork, the cork reseals, protecting the wine from oxidation and leaving the remaining wine unaffected.

Coravin has been widely adopted by restaurants, wine salespeople, and wine reviewers, since it makes it possible to sample or drink only one glass from a bottle without then having to finish it immediately, but wine writer Jamie Goode suggested in 2021 that the argon might subtly alter the wine and that reviewers using a Coravin opener should therefore declare that fact.

By June 2014, 13 complaints had been made of broken bottles following use of the Coravin opener. Lambrecht estimated that only 1 in 70,000 bottles will break, attributing the issue to bottles that have been dropped and cracked. In response to the complaints, Coravin sent purchasers a neoprene protective sleeve to cover the bottles.

== Awards ==
The Coravin wine by-the-glass system has been nominated for and won awards for innovation or technology.

- November 2013: Popular Science's “Best of What’s New” in the Home category.
- December 2013: La Revue du vin de France's award for “the most innovative product in the world of wine” for 2013.
- Red Dot Award for Product Design (2019).
- Wine Star Award: Innovator of the Year, Wine Enthusiast (2021).

== See also ==
- Wine accessory
- Wine tasting
