= Castavinol C3 =

- Chemical structure of castavinol C3

Identifiers
| CAS Number | 183607-17-2 = |
| 3D model (JSmol) | Interactive image; Interactive image |
| ChemSpider | 59694876 |
| PubChem CID | 57515151 |
| UNII | ZHZ5SCW9G9 |
| CompTox Dashboard (EPA) | DTXSID301029755 |
- InChI: InChI=1S/C26H30O14/c1-9(28)25(2)18-17-12(30)6-11(29)7-14(17)39-26(40-25,10-4-13(31)19(32)15(5-10)36-3)23(18)38-24-22(35)21(34)20(33)16(8-27)37-24/h4-7,16,18,20-24,27,29-35H,8H2,1-3H3 Key: ADFRCNLBRJARNV-UHFFFAOYSA-N; Key: ALSDFAORYWHNNX-UFFWUXHJSA-N
- SMILES: OC2C(O)C(O)C(OC2CO)OC4C3C(C)(C(C)=O)OC4(c(cc1OC)cc(O)c1O)Oc5c3c(O)cc(O)c5; COc1cc([C@@]23Oc4cc(O)ccc4[C@@H]([C@H]2O[C@@H]2O[C@@H](CO)[C@@H](O)[C@H](O)[C@@H]2O)C(C)(C(C)=O)O3)cc(O)c1O

Properties
| Chemical formula | C_{26}H_{30}O_{14} |
| Molar mass | 566.512 g·mol^{−1} |
- Except where otherwise noted, data are given for materials in their standard state (at 25 °C [77 °F], 100 kPa). verify (what is ?) Infobox references

Castavinol C3 is a castavinol, a natural phenolic compound found in red wines.

== See also ==
- phenolic compounds found in wine
