= Flavanol-anthocyanin adduct =

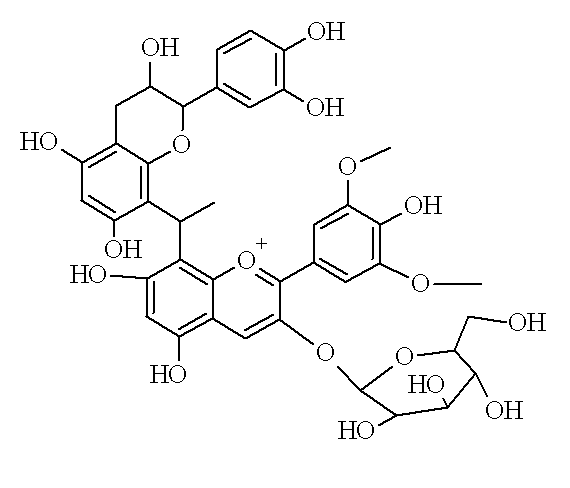
Chemical structure of malvidin glucoside-ethyl-catechin, a type of flavanol-anthocyanin adduct

Flavanol-anthocyanin adducts are formed during wine ageing through reactions between anthocyanins and tannins present in grape, with yeast metabolites such as acetaldehyde. Acetaldehyde-induced reactions yield ethyl-linked species such as malvidin glucoside-ethyl-catechin.

This type of compound has a better color stability at pH 5.5 than normal anthocyanins. When the pH was increased from 2.2 to 5.5, the solution of the pigment became progressively more violet (λmax = 560 nm at pH 5.5), whereas similar solutions of the anthocyanin were almost colorless at pH 4.0.

== See also ==
- Phenolic content in wine
- Wine color
