= Wine cup of Shah Jahan =

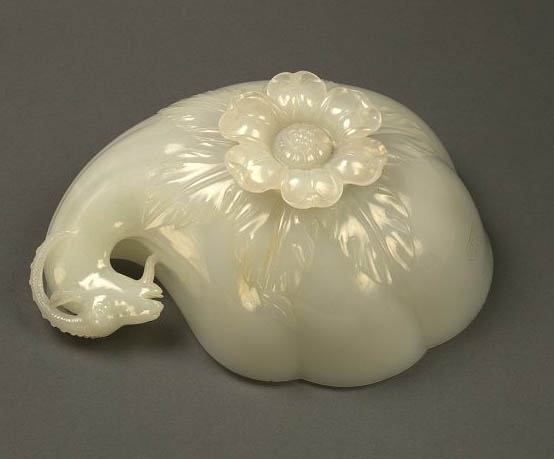
Wine cup of Shah Jahan

The wine cup of Shah Jahan is a wine cup of white nephrite jade that was made for the Mughal emperor Shah Jahan.

The cup has a gourd shape, like in a paisley design. The handle is shaped like the head of a ram. The bottom features acanthus leaves and a lotus flower, which is the pedestal. The cup is inscribed with his title, "Second Lord of the Conjunction", following the conventions of royal titulature in the Persian-speaking world. It specifically alludes to Timur, the central Asian ruler from whom the Mughals were descended. The artist who created the cup is unknown.

The cup is dated 1067 of the Islamic calendar and regnal year 31, which converts to 1657 CE. The place of production was India. The length is 18.7 cm and width is 14 cm. It was acquired in the 19th century by British Colonel Charles Seton Guthrie, most likely after the Indian Rebellion of 1857. It was formerly in the possession of R. M. W. Walker, on whose death it was sold by Christie & Co (12/7/1945, lot 146) and passed from the purchasers, Spink & Son, to Queen Maria of Yugoslavia. It again came into the hands of Spink, who then sold it to Mr Lazarus, who discovered the inscription and sold it back to the vendors. It was acquired by the Victoria and Albert Museum in 1962.

== See also ==
- Wine accessory
- Wine tasting
