= Culinary theatre =

Culinary theatre is the creation or enhancement of a spectacle during the service of food and beverages. This form of theatrics aims to excite or even entertain the diner, patron or customer, usually without affecting the flavour of the food(s) and/or beverage(s) to be consumed. In its simplest form, this may include candles and/or sparklers placed on a birthday cake, which give a dining room an exciting ambiance.

== Culinary theatrics in food service ==
It is a long established practice in many restaurants and eateries to combine some element of theatrics into the dining experience for their patrons. Crêpes Suzette, when served in medium to high-end restaurants, is traditionally served by being bussed out from the kitchen, and set alight just before being placed on the patron's table.

== Flair bartending ==
The practice of enhancing the presentation of beverages, and especially cocktails, by use of theatrics became increasingly elaborate over the 20th century. Such enhancement may include highly skilled and very fast-paced throwing, spinning, catching and juggling of liquor bottles (to the point of being a feature of the 1988 film Cocktail).

== See also ==
- Flambé
