= Crown of Bahadur Shah Zafar =

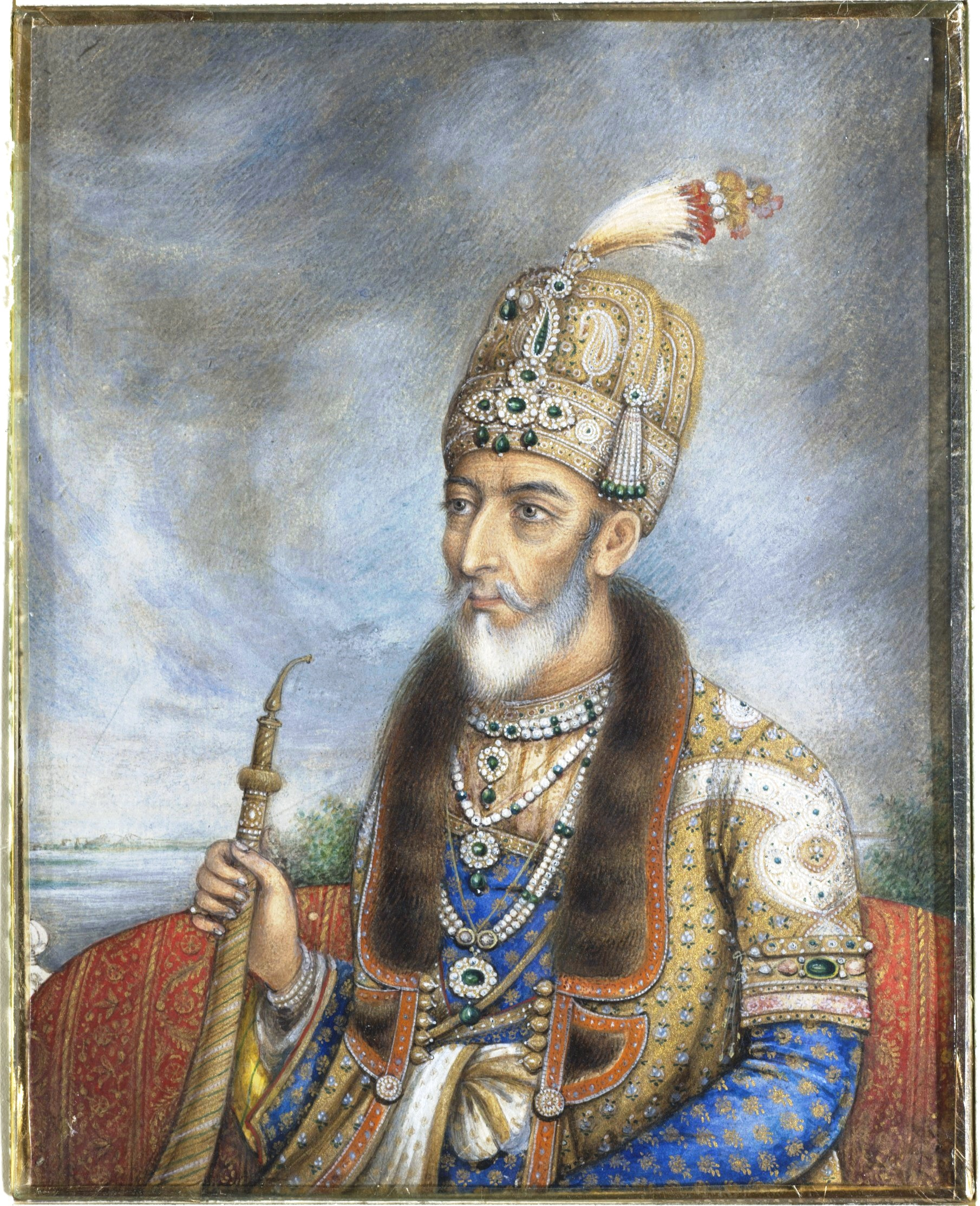
Crown of the Bahadur Shah II, ca 1850 painting

The Crown of Bahadur Shah Zafar, the last Mughal emperor (r. 1837–1857), was taken by the British in the aftermath of the Indian Rebellion of 1857 and later acquired by Queen Victoria. Following the deposition and exile of the emperor, Bahadur Shah Zafar, to Burma, the British formally abolished the Mughal Empire and auctioned off many of the imperial treasures in Delhi. Among the objects removed was a richly jewelled skullcap worn by the emperor beneath his turban, commonly referred to as his crown.

== History ==
It was created in the second quarter 19th century, most probably in Delhi or the surrounding areas by goldsmiths and jewellers. It is strictly speaking not a crown, but an article of head dress. The materials used are gold, turquoises, rubies, diamonds, pearls, emeralds, feathers and velvet. Its dimensions are 28.5 x 23.5 x 23.5 cm.

The crown was purchased, along with two throne chairs, by Robert Tytler, who had taken part in the 1857 Siege of Delhi. After bringing the items to England in 1860, Tytler rejected an offer of £1,000 from a Bond Street jeweller, instead seeking to place them in the hands of the monarchy. On 3 January 1861, Charles Wood, Secretary of State for India, informed Prince Albert of the crown’s arrival and described it as a “very rich skull-cap worn on the head of the Emperor... round the lower part of which the turban was wound.” John Lawrence, a senior British administrator, confirmed the item as authentic.

The crown was then sent to Windsor for Victoria’s inspection and subsequently purchased, along with the throne chairs. Tytler was paid £500, a figure he and his wife later regarded as inadequate. He had been promised a future appointment in India in exchange, but this never materialised. Harriet Tytler later expressed enduring bitterness over what she saw as a dishonourable and exploitative transaction after her husband acquired the forcibly auctioned crown.

It is part of the Royal Collection with the inventory number RCIN 67236.
