= Oenin =

Names
- IUPAC name 3-(β-D-Glucopyranosyloxy)-4′,5,7-trihydroxy-3′,5′-dimethoxyflavylium
- Systematic IUPAC name 5,7-Dihydroxy-2-(4-hydroxy-3,5-dimethoxyphenyl)-3-{[(2S,3R,4S,5S,6R)-3,4,5-trihydroxy-6-(hydroxymethyl)oxan-2-yl]oxy}-1λ^{4}-benzopyran-1-ylium
- Other names Enin; Malvidin-3-glucoside; Malvidin 3-O-glucoside

Identifiers
CAS Number	7228-78-6
3D model (JSmol)	Interactive image
ChEMBL	ChEMBL403236; ChEMBL602754
ChemSpider	391785
ECHA InfoCard	100.027.847
KEGG	C12140
PubChem CID	443652
UNII	B34F52D7NB
CompTox Dashboard (EPA)	DTXSID30332124
- InChI: InChI=1S/C23H24O12/c1-31-14-3-9(4-15(32-2)18(14)27)22-16(7-11-12(26)5-10(25)6-13(11)33-22)34-23-21(30)20(29)19(28)17(8-24)35-23/h3-7,17,19-21,23-24,28-30H,8H2,1-2H3,(H2-,25,26,27)/p+1/t17-,19-,20+,21-,23-/m1/s1 Key: PXUQTDZNOHRWLI-OXUVVOBNSA-O; InChI=1/C23H24O12/c1-31-14-3-9(4-15(32-2)18(14)27)22-16(7-11-12(26)5-10(25)6-13(11)33-22)34-23-21(30)20(29)19(28)17(8-24)35-23/h3-7,17,19-21,23-24,28-30H,8H2,1-2H3,(H2-,25,26,27)/p+1/t17-,19-,20+,21-,23-/m1/s1 Key: PXUQTDZNOHRWLI-JIKKCJRGBW
- SMILES: COC1=CC(=CC(=C1O)OC)C2=C(C=C3C(=CC(=CC3=[O+]2)O)O)OC4C(C(C(C(O4)CO)O)O)O

Properties
Chemical formula	C_{23}H_{25}O_{12}^{+}, C_{23}H_{25}ClO_{12} (chloride)
Molar mass	493.43 g/mol, 528.89 g/mol (chloride)
Appearance	dark brown powder (chloride)
- Except where otherwise noted, data are given for materials in their standard state (at 25 °C [77 °F], 100 kPa). verify (what is ?) Infobox references

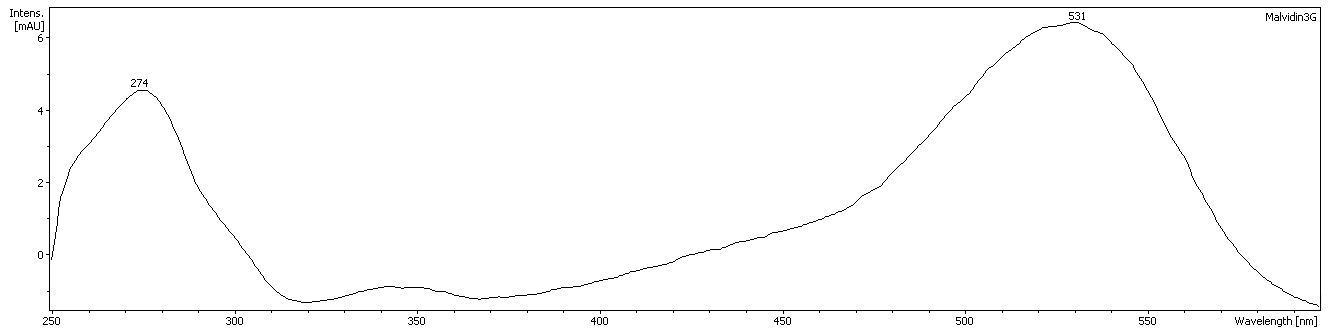
UV visible spectrum of malvidin 3-O-glucoside.

Oenin is an anthocyanin. It is the 3-O-glucoside of malvidin (malvidin-3-O-glucoside). It is one of the red pigments found in purple grape skins and red wine.

Color stabilization of oenin at a higher pH can be explained by self-aggregation of the flavylium cation and copigmentation with the Z-chalcone form. In the presence of procyanidin C2, the red color of oenin appears more stable. However, the HPLC chromatogram shows a decrease in the amplitude of the peaks of oenin and procyanidin C2. Concomitantly, a new peak appears with a maximal absorption in the red region. This newly formed pigment probably comes from the condensation of oenin and procyanidin C2.

Oenin alone is not oxidized in the presence of grape polyphenol oxidase, whereas it is degraded in the presence of a crude grape PPO extract and of caftaric acid forming anthocyanidin-caftaric acid adducts.

== See also ==
- Phenolic compounds in wine
- Wine color
- Malvidin glucoside-ethyl-catechin
- Anthocyanone A, a degradation product of oenin found in wine
