= Bartolo Mascarello =

Bartolo Mascarello (1927 – March 12, 2005) was an Italian winemaker most known for producing Barolo wine. Bartolo joined the family firm, Cantina Mascarello, in 1945 and learned winemaking from his father, Giulio, who in turn had been trained by his father, Bartolomeo. Mascarello spent most of his life tending four small vineyards in prime locations: Cannubi, San Lorenzo, Rué in Barolo, and Rocche in La Morra. He favoured the old-school practice of blending from those four plots, instead of single-vineyard bottlings.
A teenage partisan during WWII, he was dubbed, together with fellow producers Teobaldo Cappellano and Giuseppe Rinaldi, ‘the Last of the Mohicans’ for his dogged refusal to let traditions die. For years, Mascarello's unyielding stance branded him as a has-been among some of his peers and Italian wine critics. In the late 1980s and early 1990s international and Italian critics launched an assault on traditional Barolos in favor of dark wines with coffee and vanilla sensations derived from aging in new barriques. Mascarello became the denomination's guardian of traditional Barolo, as he clung tenaciously to the methods taught to him by his forebears.
The producer – who deplored the shift from large Slavonian casks to small French oak barriques – even created a special hand-painted "No Barrique, No Berlusconi" label. He explained: "No Barrique, because I am against the use of barriques in Barolo – I am a traditional producer. No Berlusconi because I don't like his type of politics." The original hand-painted labels are now a much sought-after collector's item.
Mascarello, who had a loyal core of customers from around the world throughout his career, also started to receive critical acclaim. The Italian wine world was shocked and thrilled when his wine received recognition in 2002 by the leading Italian wine guide, reversing years of criticism.
Ironic and witty, he declared shortly before his death: "As the time came to change oak casks I made sure that every corner of the cellar was filled, so that when I die there would be no room for barriques". After his death his daughter Maria Teresa took over running of the winery, following her father's traditional methods. She eschews marketing or promotion and does not have a website.
