= Sabrage =

Wine bottle opening technique

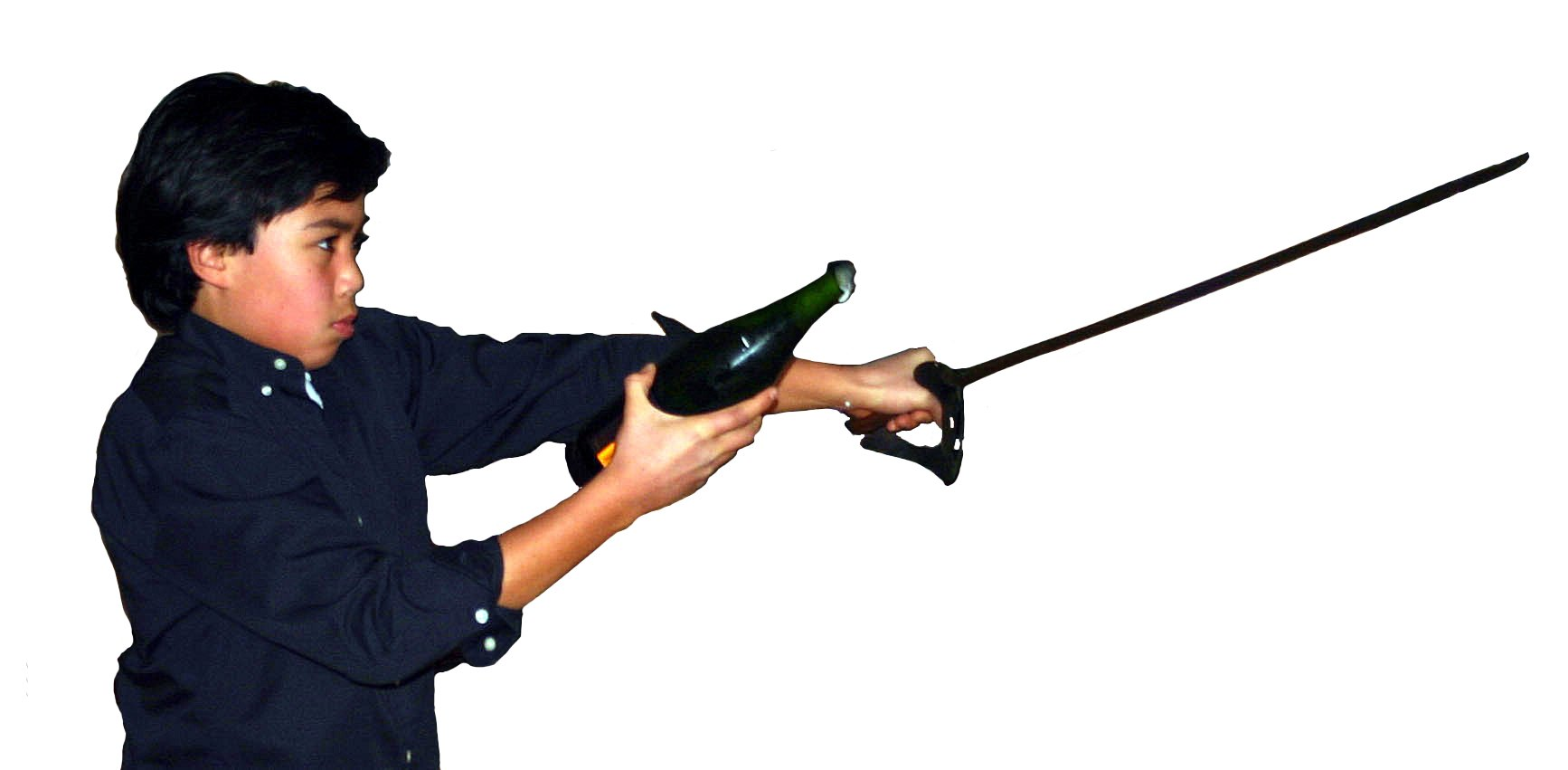
Sabering a champagne bottle with a specialized dull sword

Opening a magnum bottle of champagne with a glass strike

Sabrage (/səˈbrɑːʒ/ sə-BRAHZH, French: [sabʁaʒ]) is a ceremonial technique for opening a bottle of champagne or other sparkling wine by striking it with a sword. The blade is placed towards the base of the bottle and slid along the neck; when it hits the lip, it breaks the glass, separating the collar of the bottle from its neck. The cork and collar remain together. This can be done using the dull side of a saber or sword, but is today most often done using a special unsharpened champagne sword.

== History ==
There are various legends around the origin of sabrage, often connected with Napoleon. One says that the Napoleanic Hussars would receive bottles of champagne while on horseback and used their sabers to open the bottles. Another says that the Veuve Clicquot would give bottle of champagne to soldiers who would open it with their saber to impress her.

== Champagne sword ==
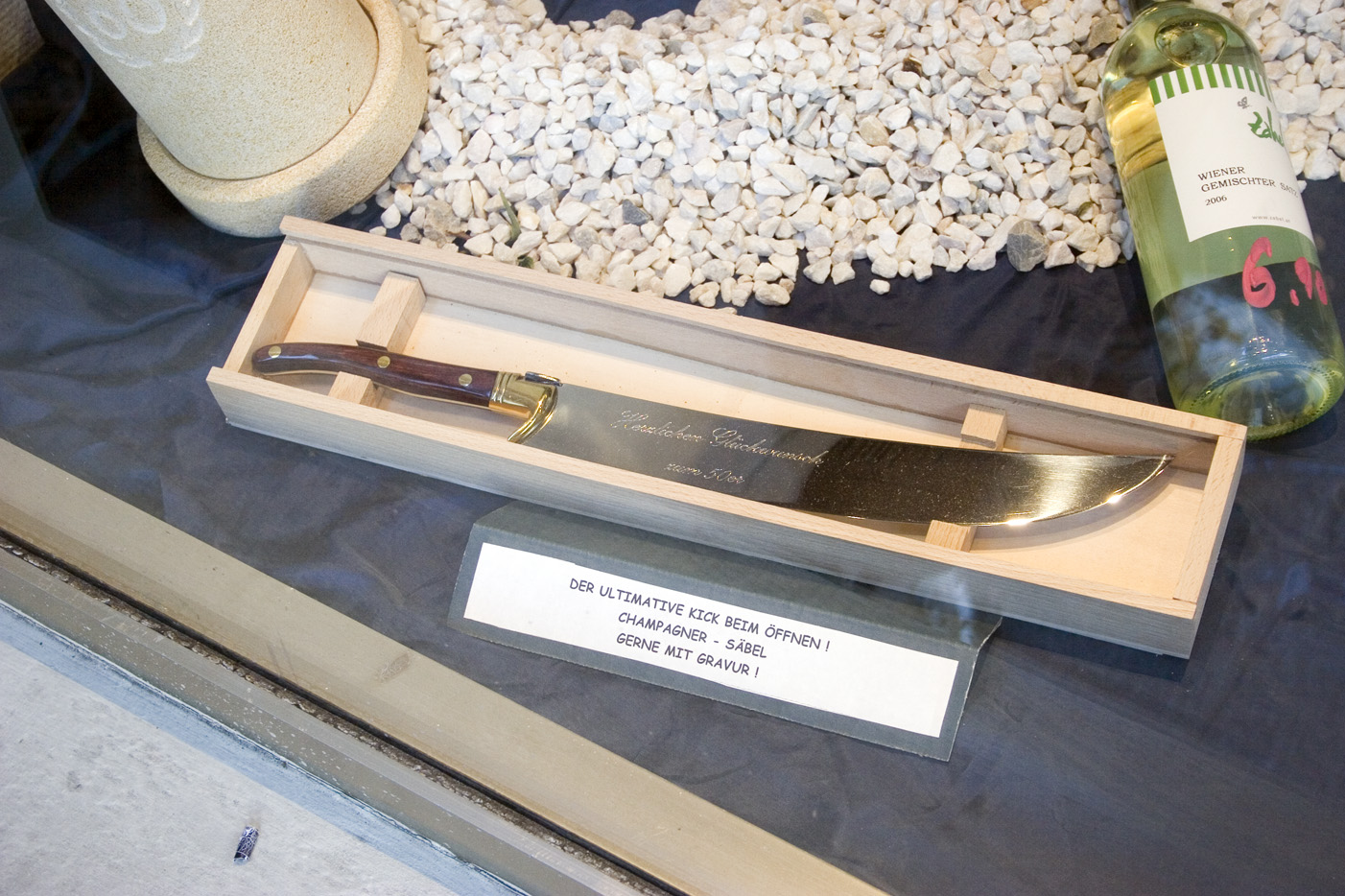
A champagne sword

A champagne sword (sabre à champagne) is an instrument specially made for sabrage. Some swords have short blades, around 30 centimetres (12 in) long and resemble large knives, although others have longer blades. The edges of the blade used should be blunt; a sharpened edge is unnecessary because in sabrage it is the impact that is important. If using a sword with a sharp blade then the flat blunt back of the blade is used. A champagne bottle can be opened with a spoon, the edge of a modern mobile phone or other similar items using the same method.

The bottle neck is held at an angle of approximately 20 degrees and the sword is cast down on it. The experienced sommelier can open the bottle with little loss of champagne. However, it is advised to allow a small flow in order to wash away any loose shards of glass that may be adhering to the neck. The first glass poured should also be checked for small glass shards.

== Physics ==
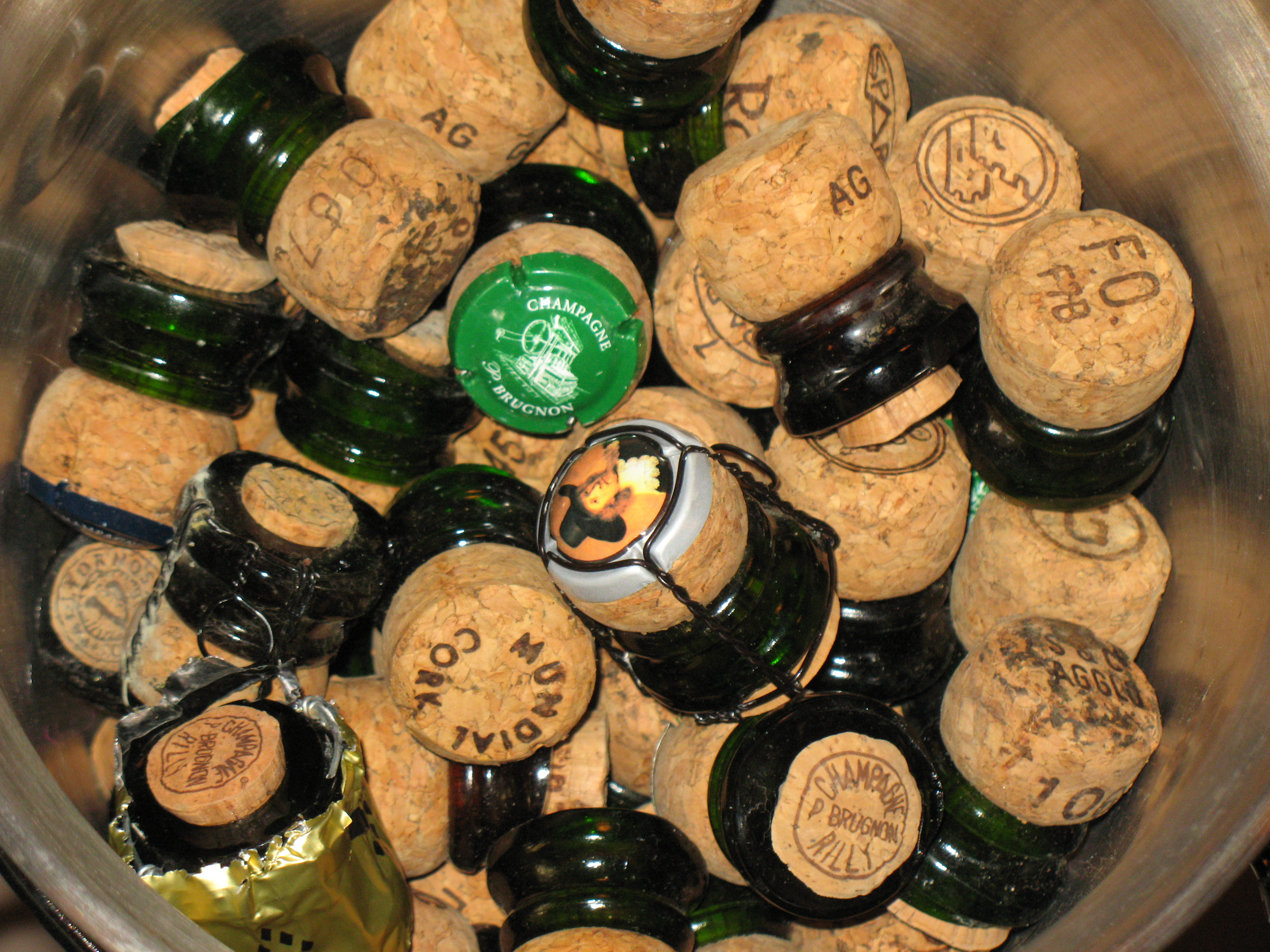
Corks, with part of the bottle, that have been removed by sabrage

A champagne bottle holds a considerable amount of pressure. With early designs, bottles tended to explode and the manufacturers kept making them thicker until they could contain the pressure caused by the release of carbon dioxide during secondary fermentation. The pressure inside a typical champagne bottle is around 5–6 atm (70–90 psi). The diameter of the opening is 18 mm (0.71 in), so there is a force of about 160 N (36 lb_{f}) trying to push the cork out of the bottle.

At the opening of the bottle, there is a lip that creates a stress concentration. On the vertical seam of the bottle there is a thin, faintly visible, prepared seam, which creates a second stress concentration. At the intersection of the seam and the lip, both stress concentrations combine and the strength of the glass is reduced by more than fifty percent. The impact of the saber on this weak point creates a crack that rapidly propagates through the glass, fueled by the momentum of the saber and the pressure in the bottle. Once the crack has severed the top from the bottle, the pressure inside the bottle and the transferred momentum from the saber will send the top flying, typically for a distance of 5–10 metres (16–33 ft).

== Records ==
The Guinness Book of World Records recognises the greatest number of champagne bottles sabered in one minute as 91, which was achieved by Mirko Rainer at Sektmanufaktur Winkler, Cornaiano BZ, Italy on 22 May 2026. It is an improvement on his previous Guinness World Record of 68, which he achieved on 3 February 2023 in Milan, Italy, on the set of the TV Show ''Lo Show Dei Record''. Rainer used his own design of sabre - the MRK-Sabre à Champagne - to achieve that record. The record of 68 was, in turn, an improvement of the record of 66 that was held by Ashrita Furman for nearly 10 years. He set it on 2 August 2015 at the Sri Chinmoy Centre, Jamaica, Queens, USA.

The greatest number of champagne bottles sabered simultaneously was 623. It was officially recognised a world record by an occasion of the Sciabolata del Santero in Santo Stefano Belbo in Italy in June 2016.

== See also ==
- Culinary theatre
