= Mumtaz Mahal (Red Fort) =

Coordinates: 28.654494°N 77.243445°E

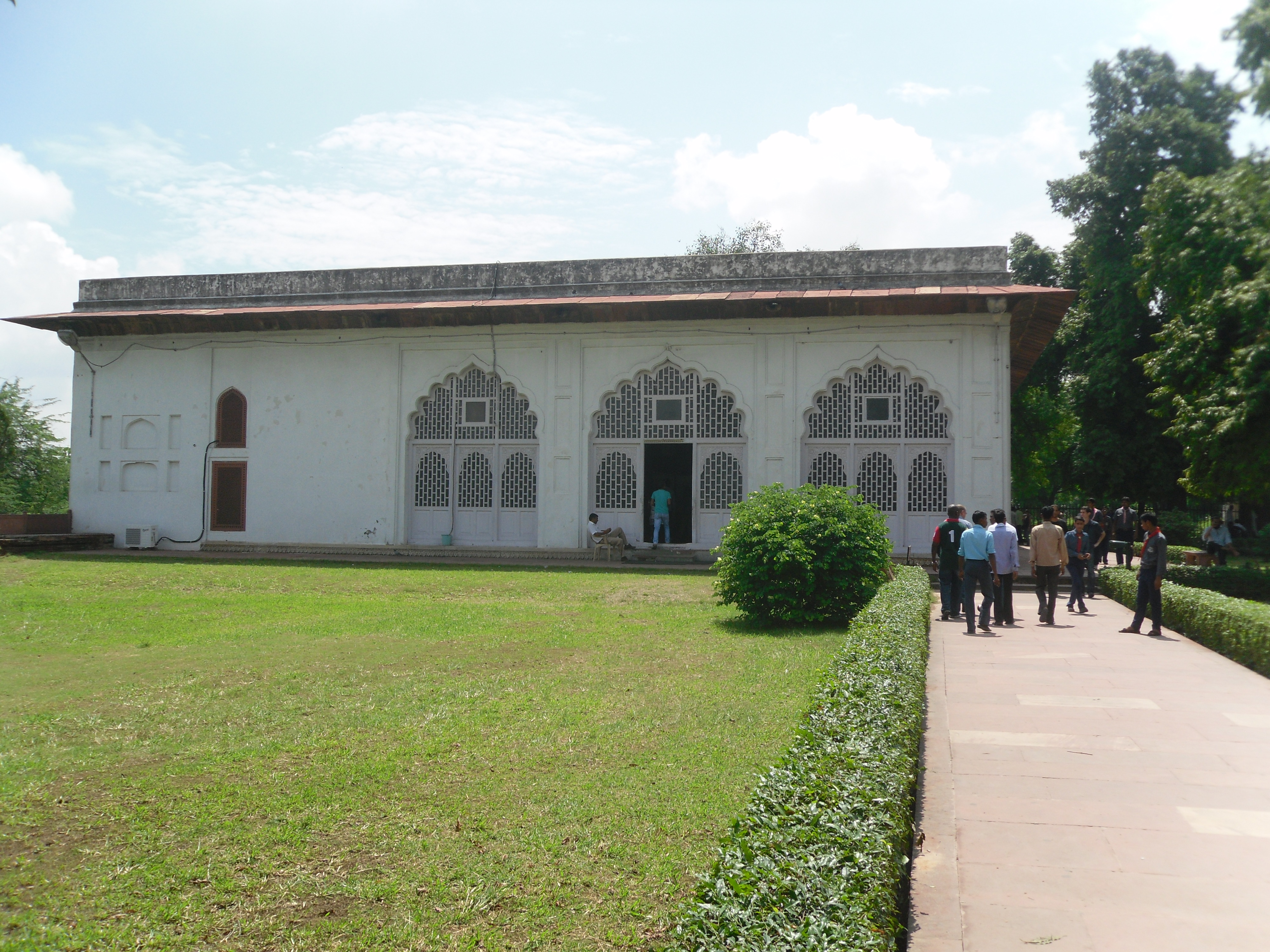
The Mumtaz Mahal in the Red Fort

The Mumtaz Mahal (Hindustani: ممتاز محل, मुमताज़ महल, literally Jewel Palace) is located in the Red Fort, Old Delhi.

The Mumtaz Mahal is one of the six main palaces that were situated facing the Yamuna River. All six palaces were connected by the Stream of Paradise (Nahr-i-Bishisht), a waterway which ran through them. At one time the Chhoti Baithak, which no longer exists, was located just to the north of the Mumtaz Mahal.

The building was constructed with white marble in the lower half of its walls and pillars. It consists of six apartments divided by arched piers and was originally painted with floral decorations on the interior. The Mumtaz Mahal was part of the Zenana. After the British occupied the fort, it was used as a prison camp.

The building currently houses an exhibition of the Red Fort Archaeological Museum, consisting largely of exhibits of the Mughal period.
