= Compound NJ2 =

Names
- IUPAC name 6,20-bis(3,4-dihydroxyphenyl)-7,10,16,19-tetrahydroxy-5,21-dioxa-13-oxoniapentacyclo[12.8.0.0^{3,12}.0^{4,9}.0^{17,22}]docosa-1,3(12),4(9),10,13,15,17(22)-heptaene-2-carboxylic acid

Identifiers
3D model (JSmol)	Interactive image
PubChem CID	73194534
- InChI: InChI=1S/C32H24O13/c33-15-3-1-11(5-19(15)37)28-21(39)7-13-17(35)9-23-25(30(13)44-28)27(32(41)42)26-24(43-23)10-18(36)14-8-22(40)29(45-31(14)26)12-2-4-16(34)20(38)6-12/h1-6,9-10,21-22,28-29,39-40H,7-8H2,(H6-,33,34,35,36,37,38,41,42)/p+1 Key: VVMHZAVGHYVZHM-UHFFFAOYSA-O
- SMILES: Oc6ccc(cc6O)C7Oc(c5CC7O)c4c(C(=O)O)c(c(cc1O)[o+]c4cc5O)c(c1CC2O)OC2c(cc3O)ccc3O

Properties
Chemical formula	C_{32}H_{25}O_{13}^{+}
Molar mass	617.538 g·mol^{−1}
- Except where otherwise noted, data are given for materials in their standard state (at 25 °C [77 °F], 100 kPa). Infobox references

Compound NJ2 is a xanthylium yellowish pigment found in wine.

In model solutions, colorless compounds, such as catechin, can give rise to new types of pigments. The first step is the formation of colorless dimeric compounds consisting of two flavanol units linked by carboxy-methine bridge. This is followed by the formation of xanthylium salt yellowish pigments and their ethyl esters, resulting from the dehydration of the colorless dimers, followed by an oxidation process. The loss of a water molecule takes place between two A ring hydroxyl groups of the colorless dimers.

== See also ==
- Wine color
- Phenolic content in wine
