= Sediment (wine) =

Solid material at the bottom of a wine container

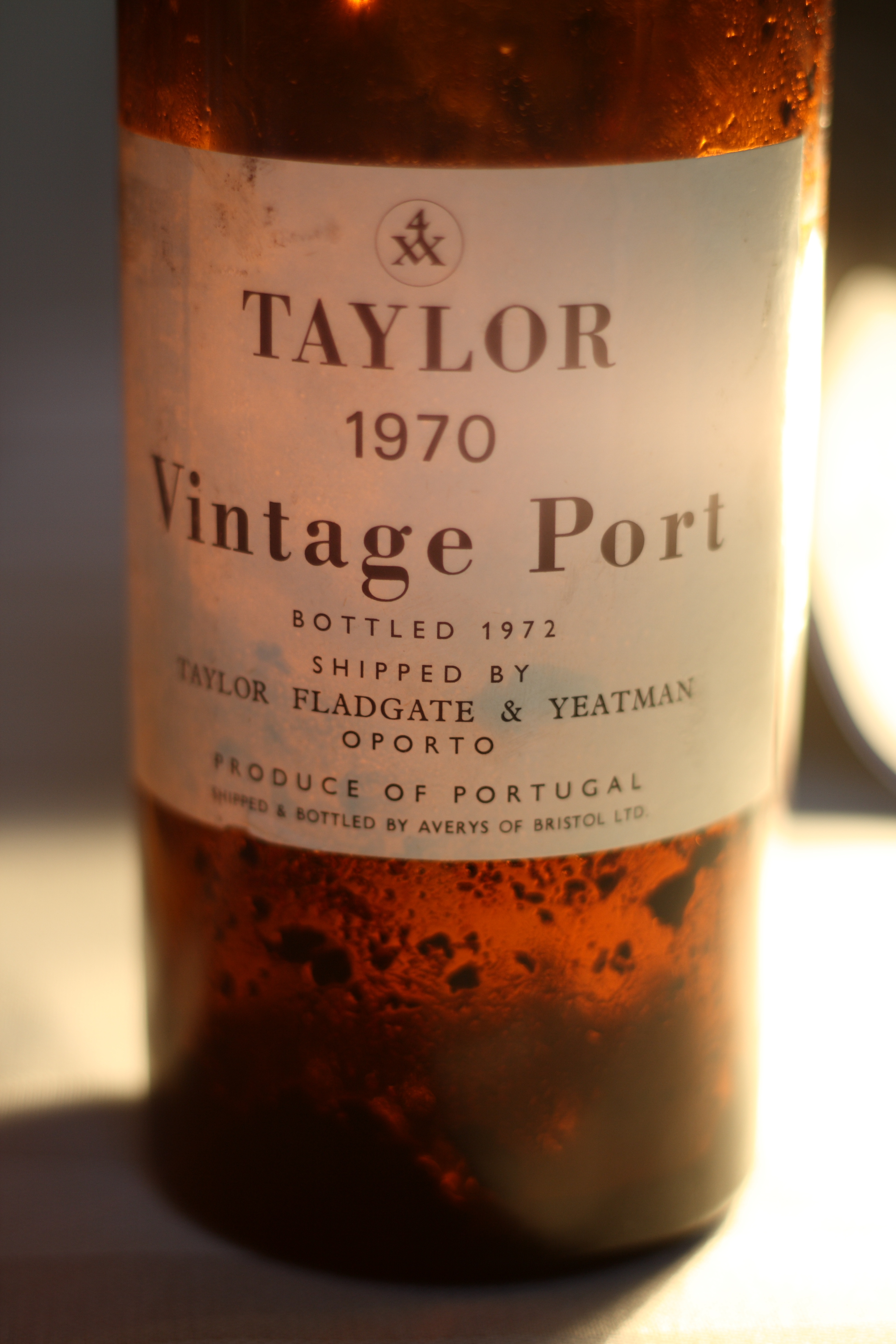
Sediment in a bottle of vintage port wine.

Sediment is the solid material that settles to the bottom of any wine container, such as a bottle, vat, tank, cask, or barrel. Sediment is a highly heterogeneous mixture which at the start of wine-making consists of primarily dead yeast cells (lees) the insoluble fragments of grape pulp and skin, and the seeds that settle out of new wine. At subsequent stages, it consists of tartrates and, from red wines, phenolic polymers, as well as any insoluble material added to assist clarification.

Sediments in bottled wines are relatively rare, and usually, signal a fine wine that has already spent some years in the bottle. So unaccustomed have modern consumers become that many (erroneously) view it as a fault. Many winemakers therefore take great pains to ensure that the great majority of wines made today (especially those designed to be drunk within their first few years) will remain free of sediment for this time. Wines designed for long bottle aging frequently deposit crystals of tartrates. In addition, red wines also deposit pigmented tannins. Winemakers deliberately leave more tartrates and phenolics in wines designed for long aging in the bottle so that they can develop the aromatic compounds that make up a bouquet.

== See also ==
- Decanter
