= Wine accessory =

Equipment used in the storing or serving of wine

Wine accessories are things that may be used in the storage or serving of wine. Wine accessories include many items such as wine glasses, corkscrews, and wine racks.

== Glasses ==
Wine glasses are a type of glass stemware that are used to drink and taste wine from. Selection of a particular wine glass for a wine style is important, as the glass shape can influence its perception.

== Bottle openers ==
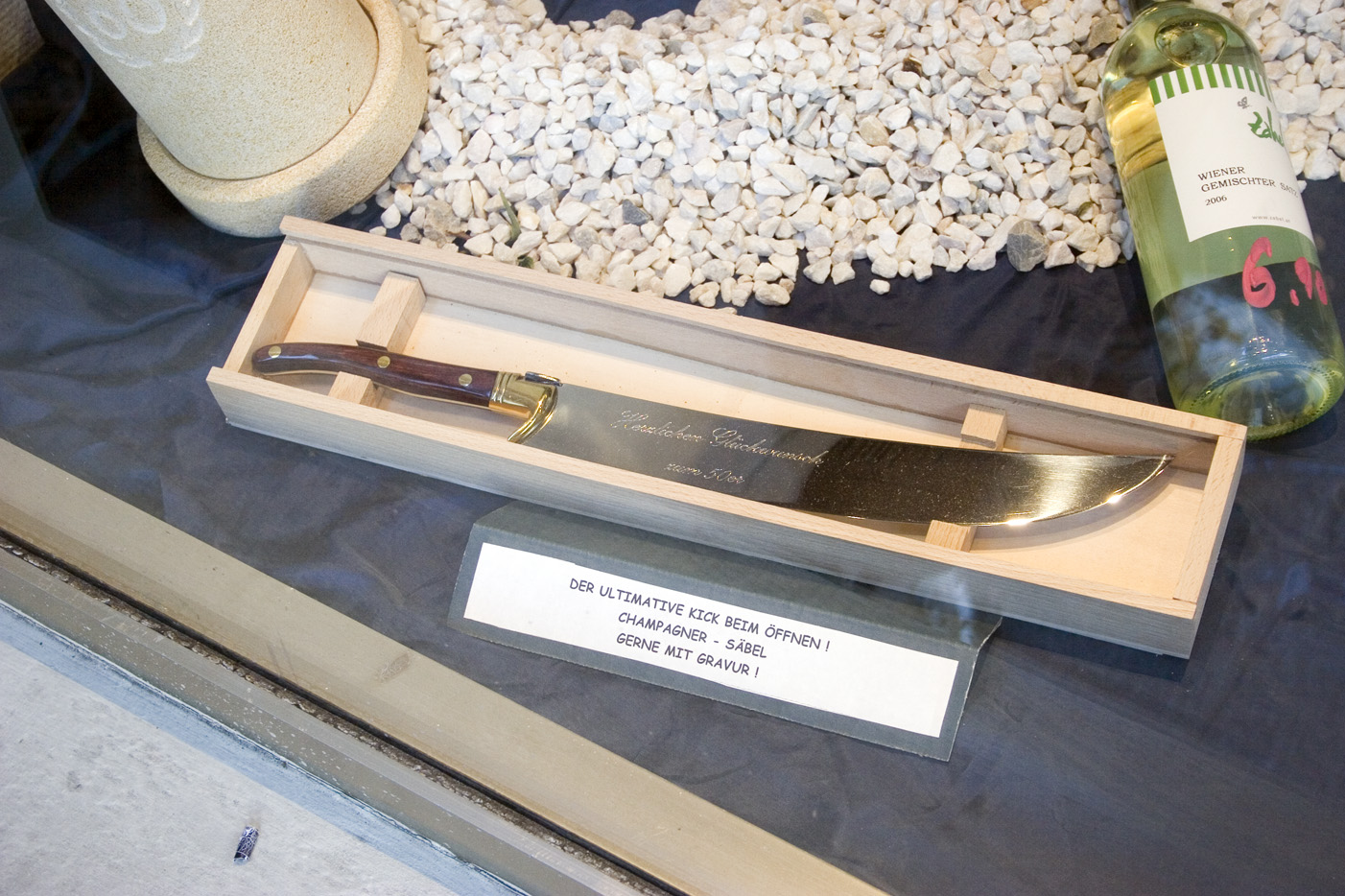
A Champagne sword

Wine bottle openers are required to open wine bottles that are stoppered with a cork. They are slowly being supplanted by the screwcap closure. There are many different inceptions of the wine bottle opener ranging from the simple corkscrew, the screwpull lever, to complicated carbon dioxide driven openers. The most popular is the wine key, sommelier knife or "waiter's friend" which resembles a pocket knife and has a small blade for cutting foil and a screw with a bottle brace.

Wine poppers are another means of opening wine. A hollow spike is driven through the cork of a bottle. A cartridge of carbon dioxide is then pressed to release a short burst of gas. The sudden increase of pressure dislodges the cork and the wine can then be served. Two problems can arise with this method: synthetic "corks" may be too dense to penetrate, and bottles not intended for pressure may break.

A Champagne sword, or sabre à champagne is a device specially made for the tradition of sabrage – cracking opening a Champagne bottle with a precise sword blow. A Champagne sword may resemble a normal sword although the blade may be blunt as a sharp blade is not necessary for opening a bottle in this manner.

Port tongs are used for opening bottles when the cork is not in a condition to be opened with a corkscrew, typically due to age. The tongs are heated and applied to the neck of the bottle, which is then cooled with cold water, causing a clean break. The wine is typically poured through a strainer into a decanter.

== Coolers ==
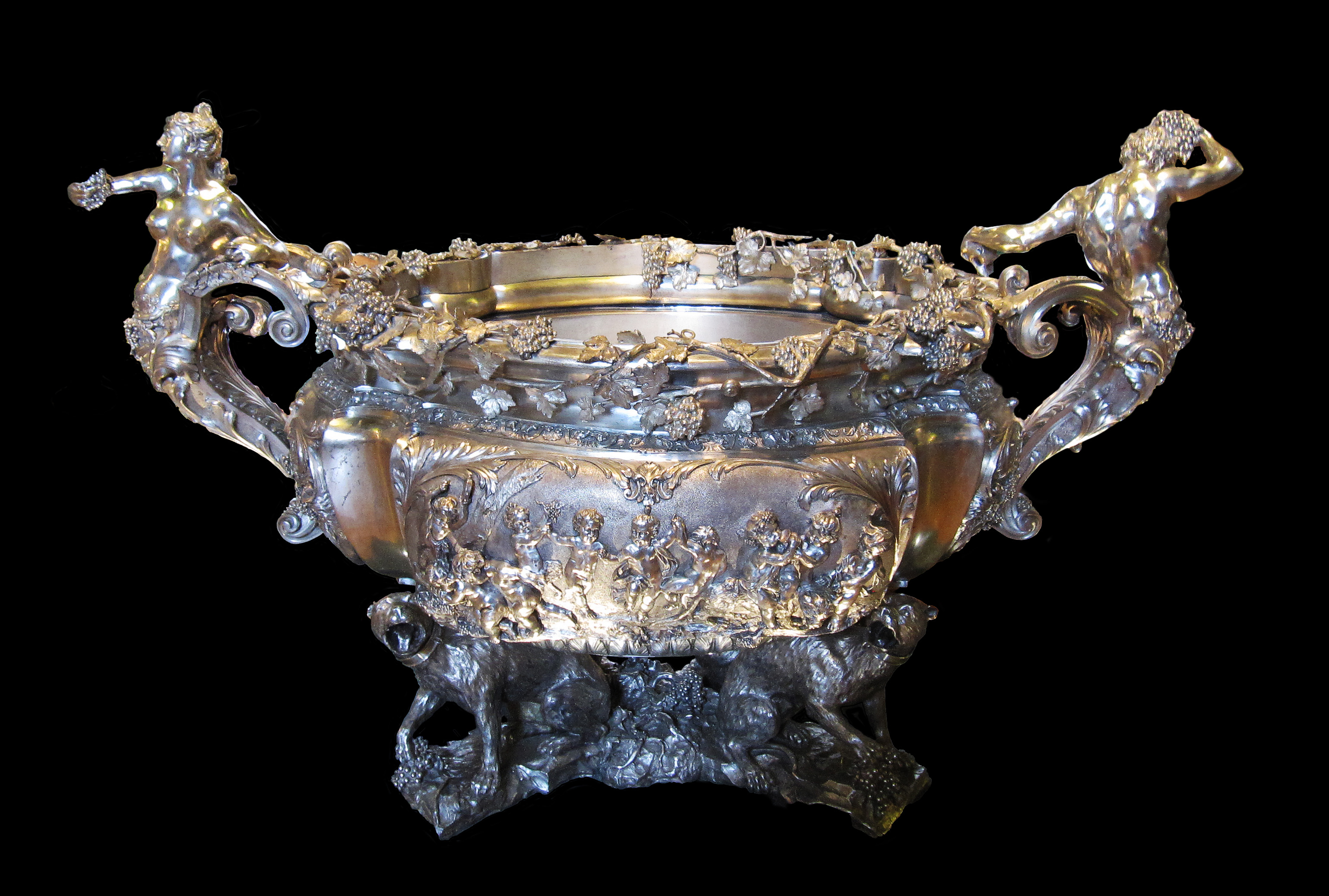
Jerningham wine cooler from 1734

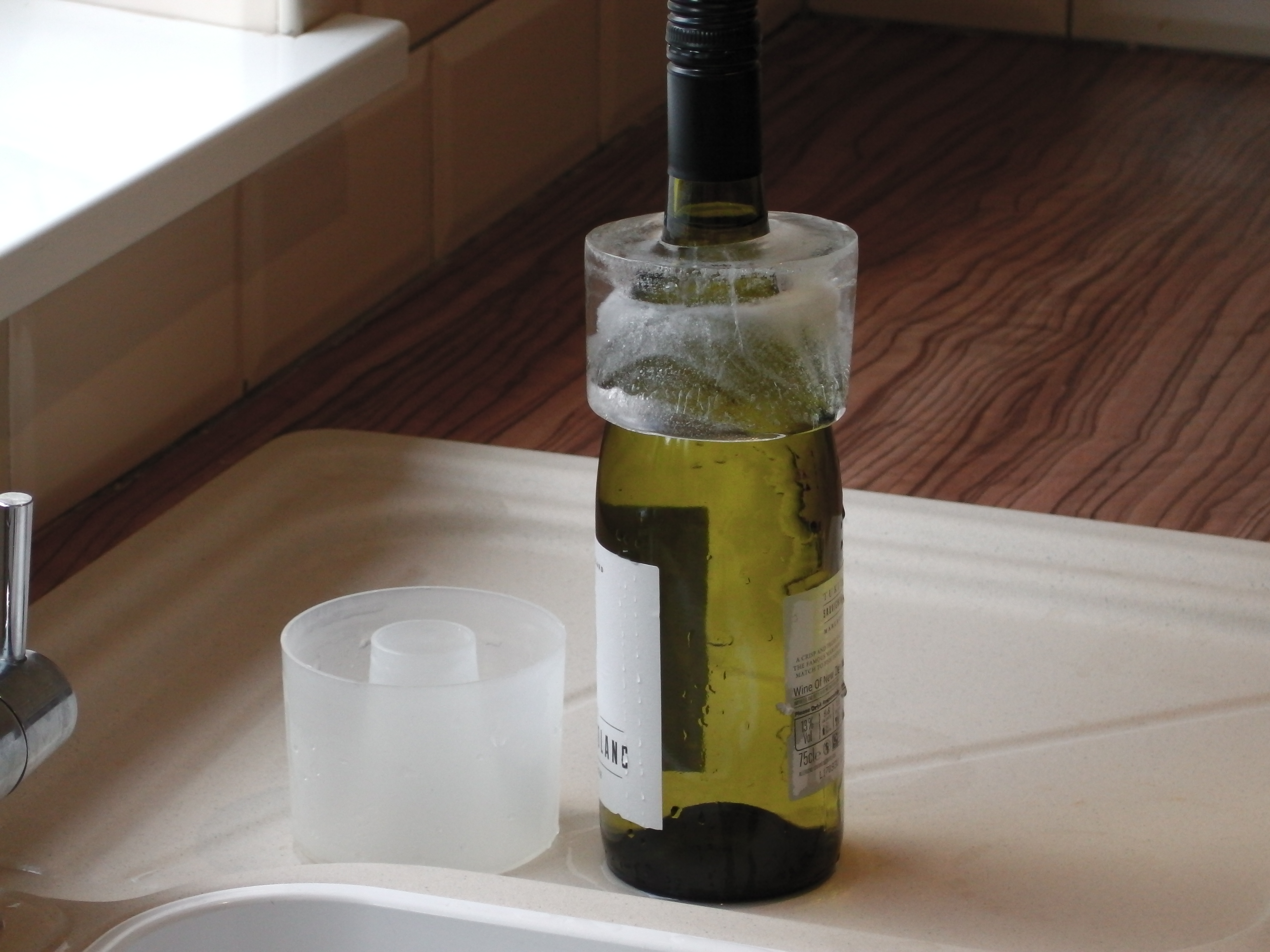
Ice ring wine cooler

Wine coolers (any type of equipment used in the chilling or cooling of wine) may include:

- Small table-top units that rapidly chill a single bottle, using ice or an electric cooling device. These can usefully achieve the desired wine-serving temperature, particularly in warmer climates. This style of wine cooler operates most appropriately for white, rosé or sparkling wines which are usually served chilled.
- Larger refrigerator-style units that store dozens of bottles at selected temperatures. These are useful for those who do not have access to a wine cellar, as temperature and humidity conditions can be replicated. Most units allow the user to select the ideal temperature for wine, and some even have options to control two separate areas for different wines. Some units are controlled by a thermostat. These can be Peltier units.
- A simple, double-walled or otherwise insulated container that keeps a chilled bottle of wine cold, also called a glacette.
- A ring of ice having an inside surface which matches the curvature of the neck of a bottle of wine. The ring sits on the neck of the bottle and cools the wine. Convection causes cool wine to sink within the bottle drawing warm wine up to the cold neck. Continuous flow within bottle ensures even cooling of the wine and achieves a consistent temperature.

== Decanters ==
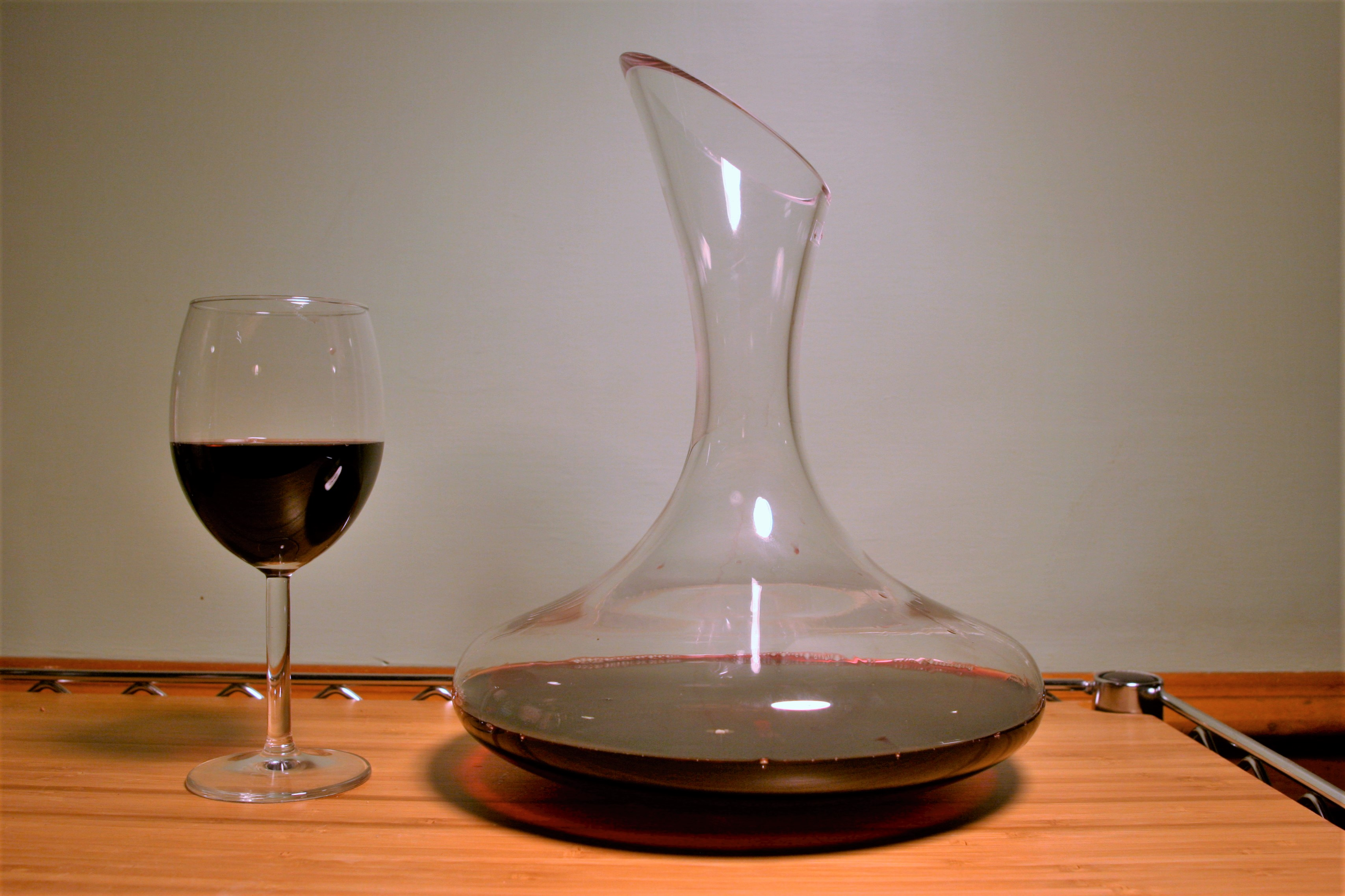
A wine decanter

A wine decanter is a glass serving vessel into which an entire bottle of wine is poured. They are used to remove sediment, aerate the wine, facilitate pouring, and improve presentation. Decanters are important when serving older vintages which are more likely to accumulate potassium bitartrate crystal sediment in the process of aging; these can be removed both by a conventional filter when first filling the decanter, and by allowing the sediment to catch on or settle into the flared base of the vessel. The flared bottom also improves aeration by creating a larger surface area for the liquid, maximising the wine-air interface and thereby introducing more oxygen which changes the wine's bouquet and taste. It also allows the evaporation of undesirable organic compounds, particularly sulfides and sulfites; this use is controversial, and some argue that this is unnecessary and harmful, with swirling the wine in the glass being sufficient and preferable. Because they are a serving vessel, not a storage vessel, they also can make wine pouring easier by preventing dribbling, and elegantly display the wine's color in clear glass, rather than the green glass used for storage.

Further accessories such as decanting cradles or decanting machines exist to facilitate decanting.

== Funnels ==
Wine funnels aid the decanting process by funnelling the wine into a decanter. Wine funnels are fitted with a gauze or mesh to trap natural deposits in the bottle.

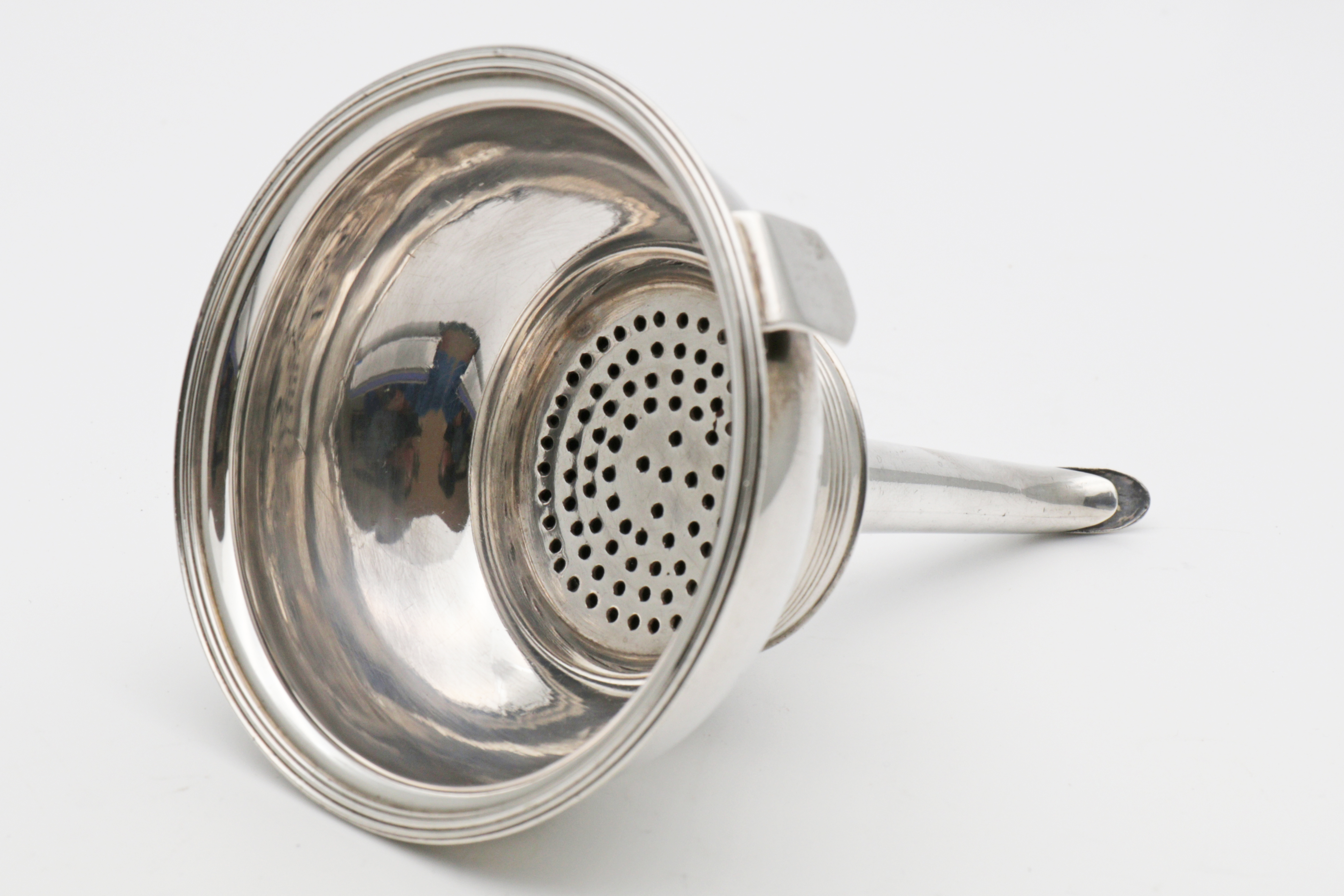
English silver ogee wine funnel from 1802

== Racks ==
Wine racks are storage devices that hold wine bottles in an orientation facilitating long term wine aging. Most wine racks are designed for a bottle to be stored on its side, with a slight slant downward towards the bottle's neck. This ensures that wine is always in contact with the cork, preventing the cork from drying out and the subsequent ingress of oxygen, which would ultimately spoil the wine. Wine racks can be made of many materials such as wood, steel, and stone, holding just several bottles to thousands. These racks also serve as decorative pieces in many homes.

== Collar ==
A wine collar is a wine accessory that fits around the neck of a wine bottle. When in place it absorbs any drip that may run down the bottle after pouring. This is beneficial for preventing stains to surfaces that the bottle comes in contact with such as table cloths or counter tops. Wine collars are also called drip rings or drip collars. There are two branded wine collars, one called a Drip Dickey and the other called a "Winewoggle"; both are registered trademarks with the U.S. Patent and Trademark Office.

Designs for this simple accessory have varied for over a hundred years. In 1872, W.R. Miller was issued a patent for a "drip cup", which formed a circular gutter that would catch the fluid. The most recognized wine collar today is typically a plastic or silver ring with an interior lining of red or black felt. When slipped over the neck of the bottle the felt absorbs the drip.

== Stopper ==
A wine stopper is an essential wine accessory to close leftover wine bottles before refrigerating them. Wine stoppers are used because of the difficulty of putting the original cork back into the bottleneck, as it expands slightly after being removed.

Wine stoppers vary in shapes, sizes, and materials. The three typical types are the cork wine stopper, rubber wine stopper, and plastic wine stopper. All these wine stoppers look very different, especially the top. The top part can be made from plastic, wood, or even precious metals and crystals. However the bottom part of the stoppers are primarily made of the above 3 typical materials, and newer versions of wine stoppers are made to expand in the wine glass to ensure a tighter seal. Some wine stoppers can be vacuum-sealed with a hand pump, to remove oxygen from the bottle, thereby extending the life of the wine by several days after opening the bottle.

== Journal ==
A wine journal is a journal for recording notes on wine consumed or tasted. It provides a catalogue for the wine enthusiast to record information such as producer, region, vintage, price, date, name of store or restaurant, ranking and tasting notes for wine, champagne and liquors for future review. Some journals offer a space for pasting in the label.

A simple, informal method of wine journaling is to take photos of wine labels. This is considerably easier today due to the prevalence of compact digital cameras and camera phones.

== Thief ==
A wine thief is a glass or food-grade plastic pipette used in the process of wine making. It may be anywhere from 30 to 60 cm (12 to 24 in) in length and may have a bend near one end. The wine thief is used to remove a small amount of wine from a cask, carboy, or other fermentation device for testing.

Home winemakers may also use a wine thief in connection with a length of tubing to siphon wine from one container to the other (a process called racking) or to transfer the wine to bottles.

== Tastevin ==
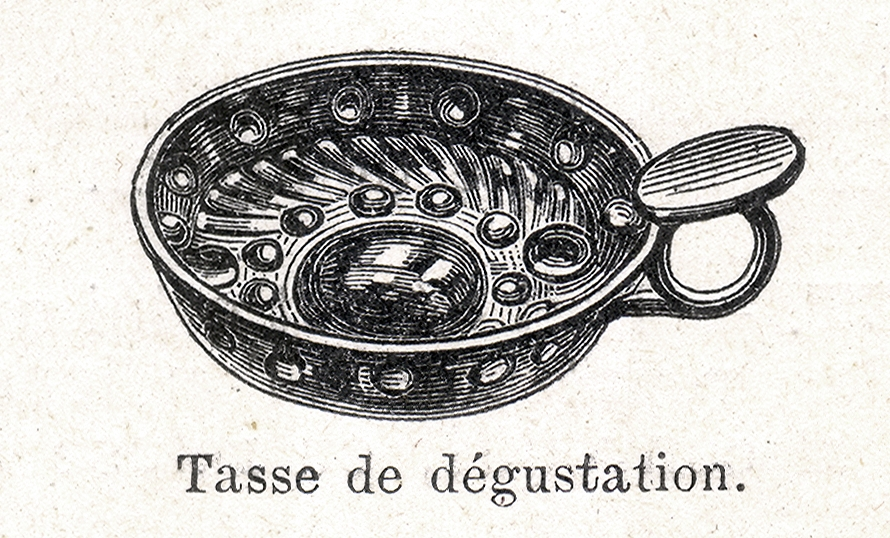
Tastevin

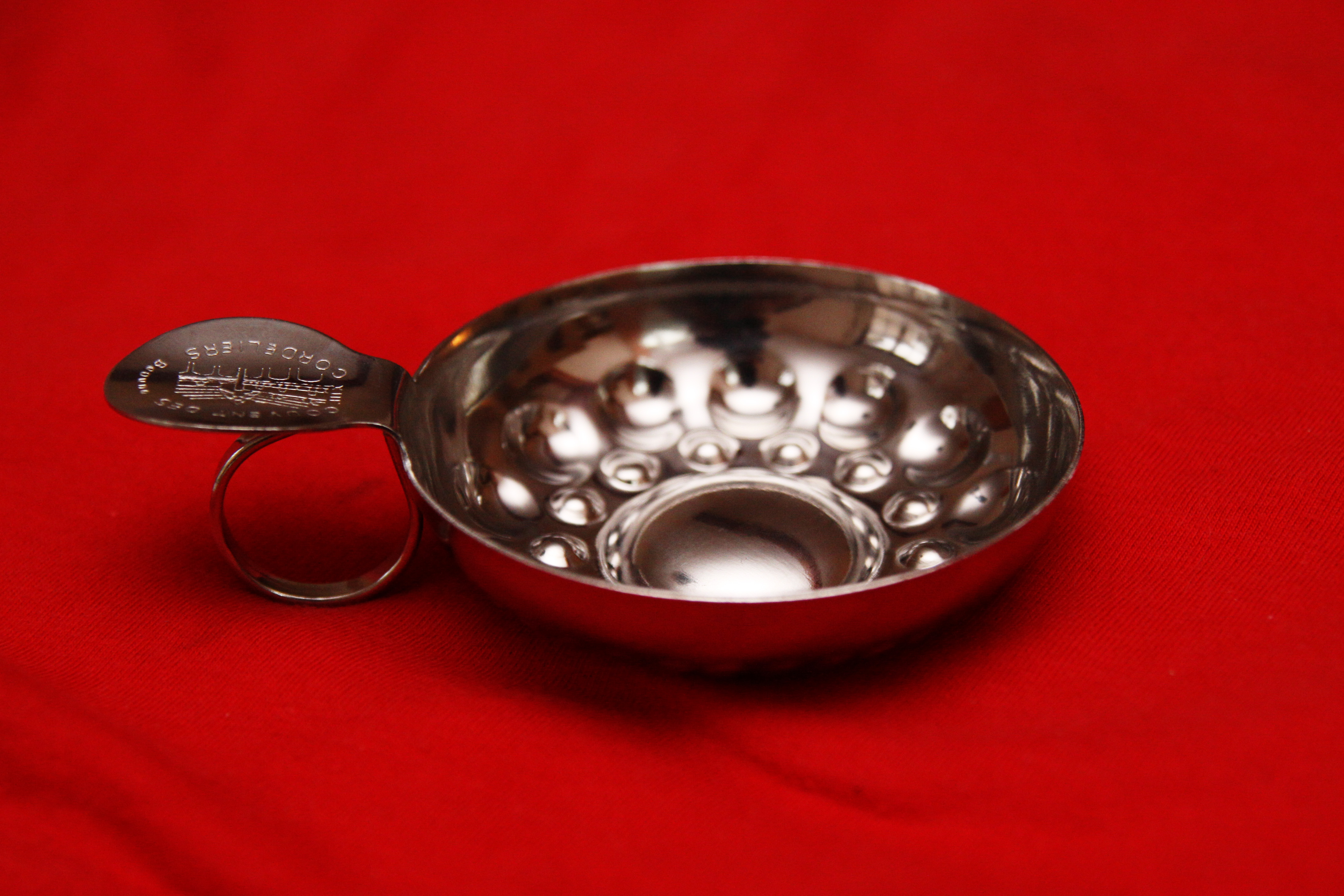
Tastevin

A tastevin (/ˌtæstəˈvæ̃/, French: [tastəvɛ̃]) is a small, very shallow silver cup or saucer traditionally used by winemakers and sommeliers when judging the maturity and taste of a wine.

The saucer-like cups were originally named by Burgundian winemakers and allowed them to judge the clarity and color of wine that was stored in dim, candle-lit wine cellars. Regular wine glasses were too deep to allow for accurate judging of the wine's color in such faint light. Tastevins are designed with a shiny faceted inner surface. Often, the bottom of the cup is convex in shape. The facets, convex bottom, and the shiny inner surface catch as much available light as possible, reflecting it throughout the wine in the cup, making it possible to see through the wine.

With the advent of modern electric lights, tastevins have very little practical use, although sommeliers often wear them on a ribbon or chain around the neck as a nod to tradition.

Wine cups or tastevins are mentioned occasionally in European inventories from 1200 to 1600. Around 1680, silver cups about 3–4 inches (7.6–10.2 cm) in diameter and 1–2 inches (2.5–5.1 cm) deep came into use in France by affluent people. The custom spread and they came into general use among the wealthy around 1720–1750. They were made by master silversmiths, and were often decorated and engraved with the owner's name. Their size and shape allowed them to be carried in a pocket at all times, and they were prized possessions like rings or watches. Each region in France had its own characteristic style. They were mostly male possessions, but in Normandy about 15 per cent were engraved with women's names.

At that time, wine was sold in barrels and served in pitchers. Wine bottles were rarely used before 1800. Diners and guests carried their own knives, and ate with their fingers. Louis XIV refused to use the fork which had become fashionable in Italy, so the use of forks did not even begin in France until about 1730. One could drink using a wooden or terra cotta cup provided by the host, but carrying your own cup was more sanitary and more distinguished.

After the French Revolution, the general use of these cups died out, but winemakers and traders continued their use. After 1840 the design was mostly standardized to the type shown in the illustration above. A few tastevins were made and used in countries other than France, but only a few. In the twentieth century sommeliers in upscale restaurants sometimes carried tastevins around their necks with a ribbon or chain, and used them to check wine after opening the bottle. That custom has largely died out, but is occasionally still seen in the twenty-first century.

For the private club of oenophiles of Burgundian wines, see Confrérie des Chevaliers du Tastevin.

== Aerator ==
A wine aerator is a small, in-bottle, hand-held pour-through or decanter top device for aerating wine. These devices mix air into the wine as it flows through or over, increasing exposure to oxygen and causing aeration. They offer an alternative to swirling, traditional decanting, and to aldouze (i.e. to wait for wine to breathe). Purpose-built wine aerators became fashionable among enthusiasts by around 2010.

There are a number of styles of wine aerators and approaches to accomplish aeration. While injection-style hand-held acrylic aerators are currently most common, in-bottle and decanter top aerators are also available. Sieve-style decanter top funnels have long been used for aeration and catching sediment. Aerators are made from food-safe plastic or glass, and decanter top aerators are commonly stainless steel.

Injection-style aerators work by the Venturi effect, an application of Bernoulli's principle: they feature a wide tube that narrows. This effect is widely used in engineering applications, for example to mix air and fuel in carburetors. This method has been noted by wine experts to be too harsh for thinner skinned varietals such as Pinot noir or Gamay.

Boxed wine and vacuumed sealed wine can be aerated through the use of a single glass aerator. There are a number of different types of single glass aerators. Some have a movable spout that adjusts to the different size and shape of a wine glass.

Decanter-top aerators are the longest used and the most varied in design. Variations on the metal funnel are common, as are shapes and figures placed in the decanter neck. Pouring over the object creates agitation.

== Champagne stirrer ==
A now-rare device, the champagne stirrer, or champagne swizzle stick, is a stick, often ornamental and made of silver, ivory, or crystal, and often with a flayed end (like a branch), which is placed or stirred in champagne to reduce or remove the bubbles. Its use is heavily frowned upon as it destroys the most valued and distinctive aspect of champagne, namely its carbonation (compare the now-rare champagne coupe), and accordingly it is rarely found or used.

Champagne stirrers originally developed centuries ago, when carbonation was seen as a defect, a result of an unintended secondary fermentation; they later fell out of vogue in the mid-18th century as sparkling champagne became desired. Champagne stirrers are today particularly associated with the ostentation of the Roaring 20s, and stirrers from this period especially may be admired or collected as antiques.

Champagne stirrers operate by two mechanisms: agitation and nucleation. Stirring sparkling wine, or otherwise agitating it (such as by swirling) speeds the release of bubbles. Alternatively, a stirrer with high surface area and sharp corners provides many nucleation sites at which bubbles may form, and does not require stirring, hence the pointed and flayed design of many stirrers.

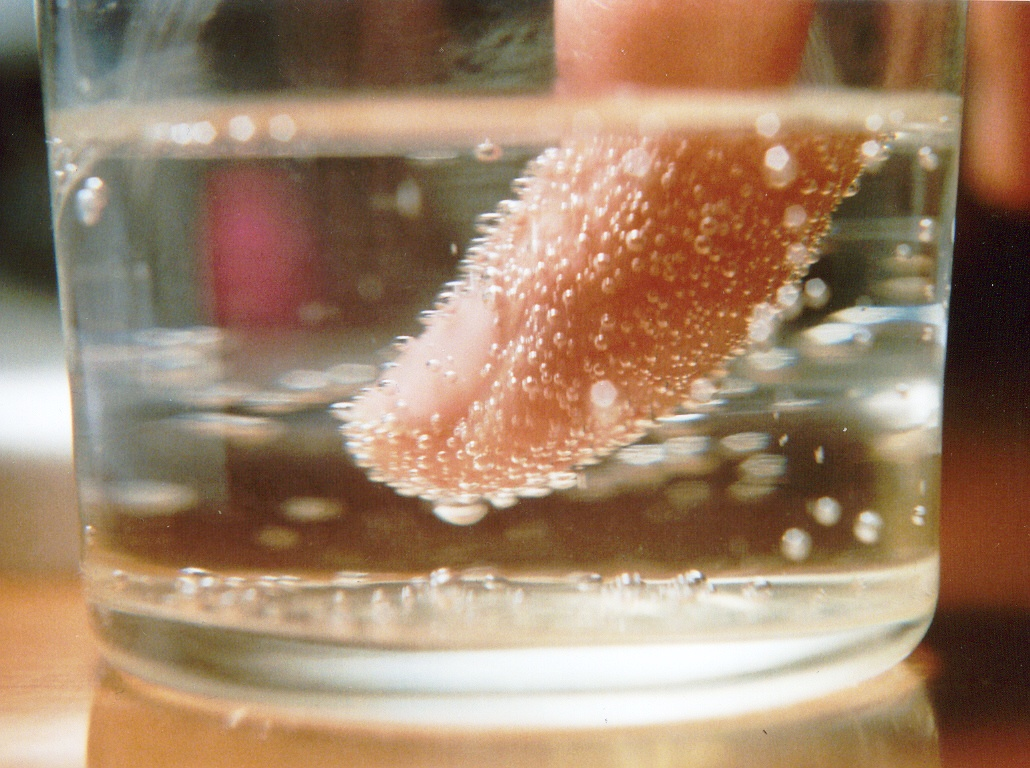
Placing an object (such as a person's index finger, shown here) in a carbonated beverage such as champagne provides nucleation sites, thus speeding the release of bubbles.

== See also ==
- Wine tasting
- Coravin
