= Patrick D'Silva =

Indian cell biologist, biochemist and associate professor

- Born: India
- Known for: Studies on neurodegenerative diseases and cancer biology
- Awards: 2014 N-BIOS Prize; 2016 CDRI Award
- Scientific career
- Fields: Cell biology; Biochemistry
- Workplaces: Indian Institute of Science

Patrick D'Silva is an Indian cell biologist, biochemist, and an associate professor at the Molecular Chaperone Lab of the Indian Institute of Science. He is known for his medical discoveries related to neurodegenerative diseases and cancer biology. The Department of Biotechnology of the Government of India awarded him the National Bioscience Award for Career Development, one of the highest Indian science awards, for his contributions to biosciences, in 2014.

== Professional profile ==
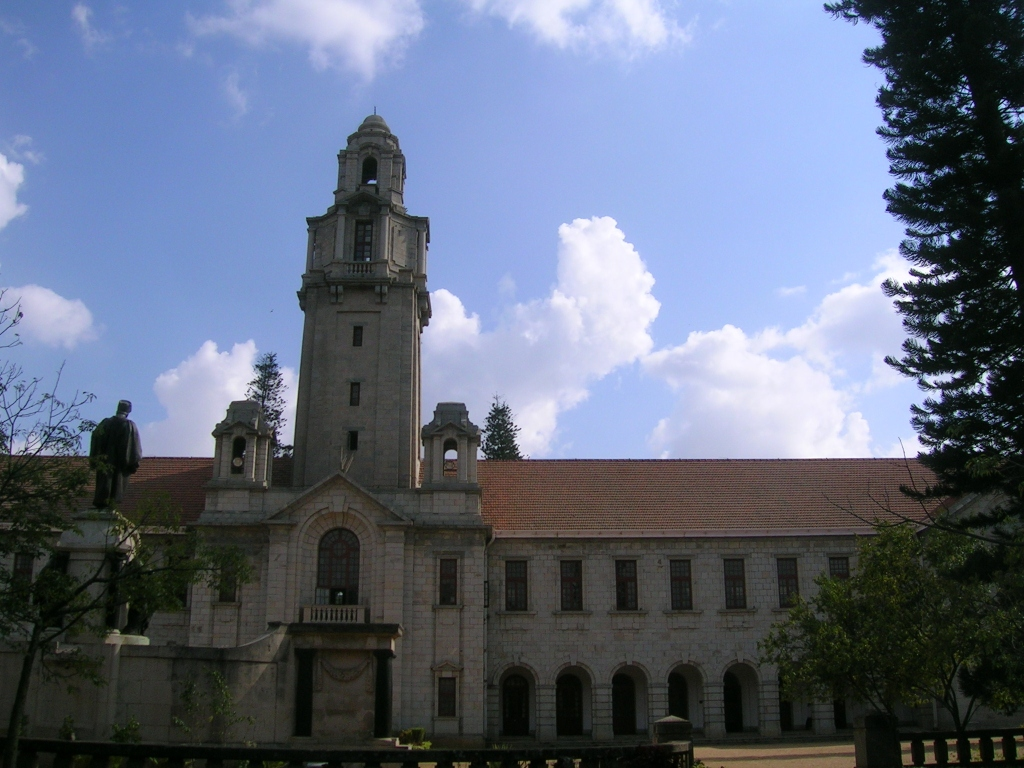
Indian Institute of Science

Sir William Richard Gowers Parkinson Disease sketch 1886

Patrick D'Silva serves as an associate professor at the Division of Biological Sciences of the Indian Institute of Science and heads the Molecular Chaperone Lab as its principal investigator. His research focus is on the cell biological aspects of neurodegenerative diseases such as Parkinson's disease and Alzheimer's disease as well as various cancers and his team is known to have made several breakthroughs in the treatment of such diseases. In 2015, D'Silva led a research which identified that Hsp31, a stress response chaperone, in Yeast provided abiotic stress tolerance to the fungus. On further studies, he found out that the chaperone acts as a detoxifier by removing a toxic metabolite named Methylglyoxal (MG) and regulates reactive oxygen species (ROS). This led to further investigations and DJ-1, a protein similar to Hsp31, helped to enhance natural detoxifiers such as glutathione (GSH) which in turn regulated the reactive oxygen species and this discovery promised to offer new ways in the management of some forms of Parkinson's disease.

Later, D'Silva and his team furthered their research and developed a metal oxide nanomaterial, which when introduced into humans, acted similar to three major cellular antioxidant enzymes which regulated the level of reactive oxygen species inside cells. This nanomaterial, made of vanadia, exhibited glutathione peroxidase enzyme activity, thus proving to be a nanozyme and it was the first time identification that all three major antioxidant enzymes in one nanozyme. This discovery is reported to have uses in drug development in cardiac disorders, and neurodegenrative diseases like Parkinson's and Alzheimer's disease. D'Silva's studies have been documented by way of a number of articles (Note: Please see Selected bibliography section) and ResearchGate, an online repository of scientific articles has listed 57 of them. He also hosts several post-doctoral and doctoral researchers at his laboratory.

== Awards and honors ==
The Department of Biotechnology (DBT) of the Government of India awarded him the National Bioscience Award for Career Development, one of the highest Indian science awards in 2014. In 2016, D'Silva received the CDRI Award for Excellence in Drug Research from the Central Drug Research Institute.

== Selected bibliography ==
- Singh, Namrata; Savanur, Mohammed Azharuddin; Srivastava, Shubhi; D'Silva, Patrick; Mugesh, Govindasamy (4 October 2017). "A Redox Modulatory Mn3O4 Nanozyme with Multi-Enzyme Activity Provides Efficient Cytoprotection to Human Cells in a Parkinson's Disease Model". Angewandte Chemie International Edition. 56 (45): 14267–14271. doi:10.1002/anie.201708573. PMID 28922532.
- Melvin, Prasad; Bankapalli, Kondalarao; D’Silva, Patrick; Shivaprasad, P. V. (1 July 2017). "Methylglyoxal detoxification by a DJ-1 family protein provides dual abiotic and biotic stress tolerance in transgenic plants". Plant Molecular Biology. 94 (4–5): 381–397. doi:10.1007/s11103-017-0613-9. PMID 28444544. S2CID 22522772.
- Vernekar, Amit A.; Sinha, Devanjan; Srivastava, Shubhi; Paramasivam, Prasath U.; D’Silva, Patrick; Mugesh, Govindasamy (21 November 2014). "An antioxidant nanozyme that uncovers the cytoprotective potential of vanadia nanowires". Nature Communications. 5: 5301. Bibcode:2014NatCo...5.5301V. doi:10.1038/ncomms6301. PMID 25412933.

== See also ==
- Govindasamy Mugesh
- Artificial enzyme
