= Polyphenol oxidase =

Enzyme involved in fruit browning

Catechol oxidase

Identifiers
- EC no.: 1.10.3.1
- Alt. names: Polyphenol oxidase

Databases
- BRENDA: enzyme data
- ExPASy: NiceZyme view
- KEGG: enzyme entry
- MetaCyc: metabolic pathway
- Rhea: reactions
- PDB structures: RCSB PDB PDBe PDBsum
Search
- PMC: articles
- PubMed: articles
- NCBI: proteins

Polyphenol oxidase (PPO; also polyphenol oxidase i, chloroplastic), an enzyme involved in fruit browning, is a tetramer that contains four atoms of copper per molecule.

PPO may accept monophenols and/or o-diphenols as substrates. The enzyme works by catalyzing the o-hydroxylation of monophenol molecules in which the benzene ring contains a single hydroxyl substituent to o-diphenols (phenol molecules containing two hydroxyl substituents at the 1, 2 positions, with no carbon between). It can also further catalyse the oxidation of o-diphenols to produce o-quinones. PPO catalyses the rapid polymerization of o-quinones to produce black, brown or red pigments (polyphenols) that cause fruit browning.

The amino acid tyrosine contains a single phenolic ring that may be oxidised by the action of PPOs to form o-quinone. Hence, PPOs may also be referred to as tyrosinases.

Common foods producing the enzyme include mushrooms (Agaricus bisporus), apples (Malus domestica), avocados (Persea americana), banana (Musa (genus)), and lettuce (Lactuca sativa).

== Structure and function ==
PPO is listed as a morpheein, a protein that can form two or more different homo-oligomers (morpheein forms), but must come apart and change shape to convert between forms. It exists as a monomer, trimer, tetramer, octamer or dodecamer, creating multiple functions.

In plants, PPO is a plastidic enzyme with unclear synthesis and function. In functional chloroplasts, it may be involved in oxygen chemistry like mediation of pseudocyclic photophosphorylation.

Enzyme nomenclature differentiates between monophenol oxidase enzymes (tyrosinases) and o-diphenol:oxygen oxidoreductase enzymes (catechol oxidases). The substrate preference of tyrosinases and catechol oxidases is controlled by the amino acids around the two copper ions in the active site.

== Distribution and applications ==
A mixture of monophenol oxidase and catechol oxidase enzymes is present in nearly all plant tissues, and can also be found in bacteria, animals, and fungi. In insects, cuticular polyphenol oxidases are present and their products are responsible for desiccation tolerance.

Grape reaction product (2-S glutathionyl caftaric acid) is an oxidation compound produced by action of PPO on caftaric acid and found in wine. This compound production is responsible for the lower level of browning in certain white wines.

Plants make use of polyphenol oxidase as one in a suite of chemical defences against parasites.

== Inhibitors ==
There are two types of inhibitor of PPO, those competitive to oxygen in the copper site of the enzyme and those competitive to phenolics. Tentoxin has also been used in recent research to eliminate the PPO activity from seedlings of higher plants. Tropolone is a grape polyphenol oxidase inhibitor. Another inhibitor of this enzyme is potassium metabisulfite. Banana root PPO activity is strongly inhibited by dithiothreitol and sodium metabisulfite, as is banana fruit PPO by similar sulfur-containing compounds including sodium dithionite and cysteine, in addition to ascorbic acid (vitamin C).

== Assays ==
Several assays were developed to monitor the activity of polyphenol oxidases and to evaluate the inhibition potency of polyphenol oxidase inhibitors. In particular, ultraviolet/visible (UV/Vis) spectrophotometry-based assays are widely applied. The most common UV/Vis spectrophotometry assay involves the monitoring of the formation of o-quinones, which are the products of polyphenol oxidase-catalysed reactions, or the consumption of the substrate. Alternative spectrophotometric method that involves the coupling of o-quinones with nucleophilic reagents such as 3-methyl-2-benzothiazolinonehydrazone hydrochloride (MBTH) was also used. Other techniques, such as activity staining assays with the use of polyacrylamide gel electrophoresis, tritium-based radioactive assays, oxygen consumption assay, and nuclear magnetic resonance (NMR)–based assay were also reported and used.

== Enzymatic browning ==
Polyphenol oxidase is an enzyme found throughout the plant and animal kingdoms, including most fruits and vegetables. PPO has importance to the food industry because it catalyzes enzymatic browning when tissue is damaged from bruising, compression or indentations, making the produce less marketable and causing economic loss. Enzymatic browning due to PPO can also lead to loss of nutritional content in fruits and vegetables, further lowering their value.

Because the substrates of these PPO reactions are located in the vacuoles of plant cells damaged mainly by improper harvesting, PPO initiates the chain of browning reactions. Exposure to oxygen when sliced or pureed also leads to enzymatic browning by PPO in fruits and vegetables. Examples in which the browning reaction catalyzed by PPO may be desirable include avocados, prunes, sultana grapes, black tea, and green coffee beans.

=== In mango ===
In mangoes, PPO catalyzed enzymatic browning is mainly caused by sap burn which leads to skin browning. Catechol oxidase–type PPO is located in the chloroplasts of mango skin cells and its phenolic substrates in the vacuoles. Sap burn is therefore the initiating event of PPO in mango skin, as it breaks down cell compartments. PPO is located in mango skin, sap and pulp, with highest activity levels in skin.

=== In avocado ===
PPO in avocados causes rapid browning upon exposure to oxygen, a multistep process involving oxidation reactions of both monophenols and polyphenols, resulting in o-quinone products subsequently converted irreversibly into brown polymeric pigments (melanins).

=== In apple ===
Present in the chloroplasts and mitochondria of all parts of an apple, PPO is the major enzyme responsible for enzymatic browning of apples. Due to an increase in consumer demand for pre-prepared fruits and vegetables, a solution for enzymatic browning has been a targeted area of research and new product development. As an example, pre-sliced apples are an appealing consumer product, but slicing apples induces PPO activity, leading to browning of the cut surfaces and lowering their esthetic quality. Browning also occurs in apple juices and purees when poorly handled or processed.

Arctic apples, an example of genetically modified fruit engineered to reduce PPO activity, are a suite of trademarked apples that contain a non-browning trait derived by gene silencing to suppress the expression of PPO, thus inhibiting fruit browning.

=== In apricot ===
Apricot as a climacteric fruit undergoes fast post-harvest maturation. The latent PPO form can spontaneously activate during the first weeks of storage, generating the active enzyme with a molecular weight of 38 kDa. Ascorbic acid/protease combinations constitute a promising practical anti-browning method as treated apricot purees preserved their color.

=== In potato ===
Found in high concentrations in potato tuber peel and 1–2 mm of the outer cortex tissue, PPO is used in the potato as a defense against insect predation, leading to enzymatic browning from tissue damage. Damage in the skin tissue of potato tuber causes a disruption of cell compartmentation, resulting in browning. The brown or black pigments are produced from the reaction of PPO quinone products with amino acid groups in the tuber. In potatoes, PPO genes are not only expressed in potato tubers, but also in leaves, petioles, flowers and roots.

=== In walnut ===
In walnut (Juglans regia), two different genes (jr PPO1 and jr PPO2) encoding polyphenol oxidases have been identified. The two isoenzymes prefer different substrates, as jr PPO1 shows a higher activity towards monophenols, whereas jr PPO2 is more active towards diphenols.

=== In black poplar ===
A monomeric catechol oxidase from Populus nigra converts caffeic acid to quinone and melanine at injured cells.

== Related enzymes ==
Prophenoloxidase is a modified form of the complement response found in some invertebrates, including insects, crabs and worms.

Hemocyanin is homologous to the phenol oxidases (e.g. tyrosinase) since both enzymes sharing type copper active site coordination. Hemocyanin also exhibits PPO activity, but with slowed kinetics from greater steric bulk at the active site. Partial denaturation actually improves hemocyanin's PPO activity by providing greater access to the active site.

Aureusidin synthase is homologous to plant polyphenol oxidase, but contains certain significant modifications.

Aurone synthase catalyzes the formation of aurones. Aurone synthase purified from Coreopsis grandiflora shows weak tyrosinase activity against isoliquiritigenin, but the enzyme does not react with the classic tyrosinase substrates l-tyrosine and tyramine and must therefore be classified as catechol oxidase.

Laccase, a multi-copper oxidase, is often considered a subclass of polyphenol oxidase. Laccase and polyphenol oxidase differ in the type of substrates that they catalyse. Catachol oxidase (a type of polyphenol oxidase) catalyses the oxidation of ortho-diphenols to ortho-quinones. Tyrosinase (another type of polyphenol oxidase), catalyses both the oxidation of monophenols to ortho-diphenols, and the subsequent oxidation of ortho-diphenols to ortho-quinones. Laccase, in contrast, catalyses the oxidation of para-diphenols to para-quinones.

== See also ==
- Catechol oxidase
- Tyrosinase
