= Artificial enzyme =

Synthetic organic molecule or ion that recreates one or more functions of an enzyme

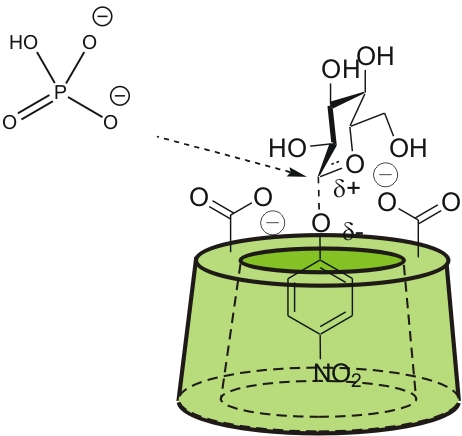
Schematic drawing of artificial phosphorylase

An artificial enzyme, also known as a synthetic enzyme or a synzyme, is a synthetic organic molecule or ion that recreates one or more functions of a natural enzyme. These molecules aim to achieve catalysis with rates and selectivity comparable to those of naturally occurring enzymes. A nanozyme is a sub-type of artificial enzyme which however is classified into the group of nanomaterials.

Current synzymes consist mainly of organic molecules tailored in such a way that they catalyse certain kinds of reactions. Like enzymes, they bind a transition state of a substrate in an active site, and like enzymes they generally obey Michaelis–Menten kinetics.

== History ==
Natural enzymes catalyze chemical reactions with high selectivity and efficiency. Catalysis occurs in the enzyme's active site, where substrates bind near functional groups, enabling proximity effects. Artificial enzymes mimic this by combining substrate-binding sites (e.g., cyclodextrins, crown ethers, or calixarenes) with catalytic groups in small molecules.

Advances include artificial enzymes based on amino acids or peptides, such as scaffolded histidine residues mimicking metalloproteins like hemocyanin, tyrosinase, and catechol oxidase. Computational design using tools like Rosetta has enabled de novo creation of artificial enzymes. In 2014, enzymes were created from non-natural molecules. A 2016 book chapter discussed future directions in artificial enzymes.

== Examples ==
If [Ru(NH_{3})_{5}]^{3+} is attached to certain histidine residues in a myoglobin protein, myoglobin is no longer a passive oxygen carrier, but gains enzymatic activity of an oxidase. Ascorbic acid is oxidised with molecular oxygen.

Cyclodextrins are cap structures with a hydrophilic exterior but a hydrophobic interior. If pyridoxal is anchored in the interior the cyclodextran shows transaminase activity.

== Nanozymes ==
Nanozymes are nanomaterials exhibiting enzyme-like properties, first coined in 2004. They have applications in biosensing, bioimaging, tumor therapy, and anti-biofouling. Unlike natural enzymes, nanozymes offer stability, multifunctionality, and scalability.

=== Development and key milestones ===
Early discoveries in the 1990s included fullerene derivatives mimicking superoxide dismutase (SOD). The 2000s saw the term "nanozyme" formalized and applications expand, such as nanoceria preventing retinal degeneration and peroxidase-like activity in ferromagnetic nanoparticles for immunoassays.

The 2010s brought numerous reviews and applications, including colorimetric assays, tumor visualization, and anti-biofouling. Key books and reviews emerged, summarizing progress.

In the 2020s, nanozymes advanced in therapeutic applications, such as single-atom nanozymes for sepsis and tumor therapy. Strategies like data-informed discovery and machine learning aided discovery, and applications in treating conditions like Parkinson's disease, inflammatory bowel disease, stroke and traumatic brain injury were reported. Nanozymes were recognized as one of IUPAC's Top Ten Emerging Technologies in Chemistry in 2022. Nanozyme is among the Top 10 Emerging Technologies of 2025 Summer Davos. A monograph entitled nanozymes was published in Chinese (《纳米酶》). Nanozyme-enhanced implants were developed.

== See also ==
- Abzyme: Antibodies can act as enzymes if they are selected against transition state analogues. Abzymes have a low K_{M}, meaning that they readily bind a target molecule, but have low V_{max} values, indicating a slow reaction rate.
- Biomimetics
- Bioorthogonal chemistry
- Catalysis
- Density functional theory
- Directed evolution
- Enzyme
- Molecular machine
- Molecularly imprinted polymer
- Nanochemistry
- Supramolecular chemistry
- Zeolite
