= Hemocyanin =

Copper metalloprotein

Hemocyanin, copper containing domain
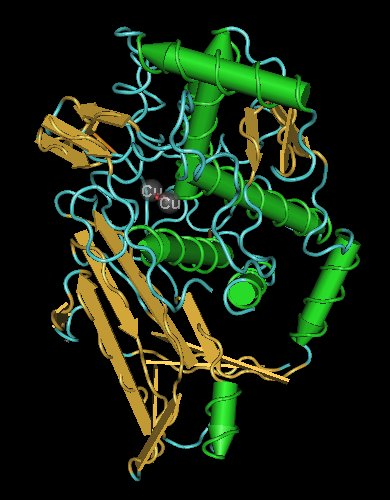
- Single oxygenated functional unit from the hemocyanin of an octopus

Identifiers
- Symbol: Hemocyanin_M
- Pfam: PF00372
- InterPro: IPR000896
- PROSITE: PDOC00184
- SCOP2: 1lla / SCOPe / SUPFAM
Available protein structures:
- PDB: 1oxy :110-373 1nol :110-373 1lla :110-373 1ll1 :110-373 1hc1A:136-393 1hcyD:136-393 1hc6B:136-393 1hc4C:136-393 1hc3C:136-393 1hc5C:136-393 1hc2C:136-393 IPR000896 PF00372 (ECOD; PDBsum)
- AlphaFold: IPR000896; PF00372

Hemocyanin, all-alpha domain
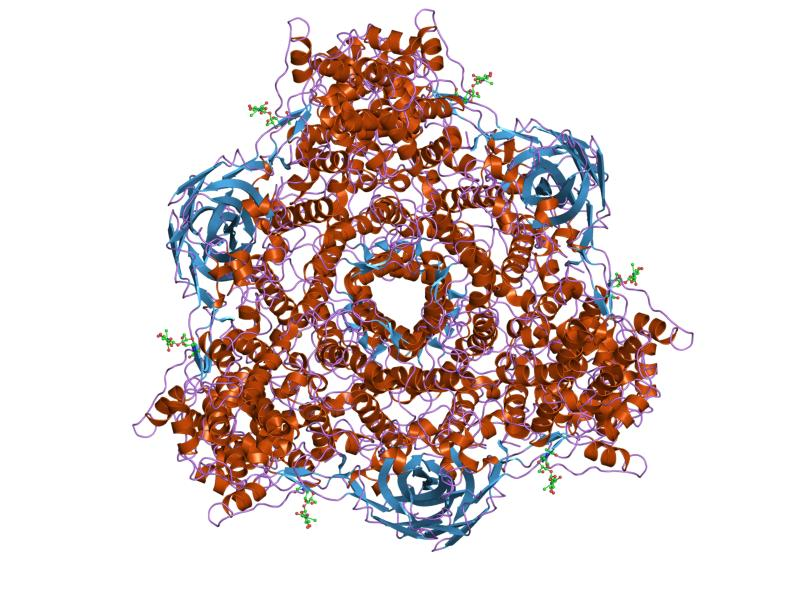
- Crystal structure of hexameric haemocyanin from Panulirus interruptus refined at 3.2 angstroms resolution

Identifiers
- Symbol: Hemocyanin_N
- Pfam: PF03722
- InterPro: IPR005204
- PROSITE: PDOC00184
- SCOP2: 1lla / SCOPe / SUPFAM
- OPM protein: 1HCY
Available protein structures:
- PDB: IPR005204 PF03722 (ECOD; PDBsum)
- AlphaFold: IPR005204; PF03722

Hemocyanin, ig-like domain
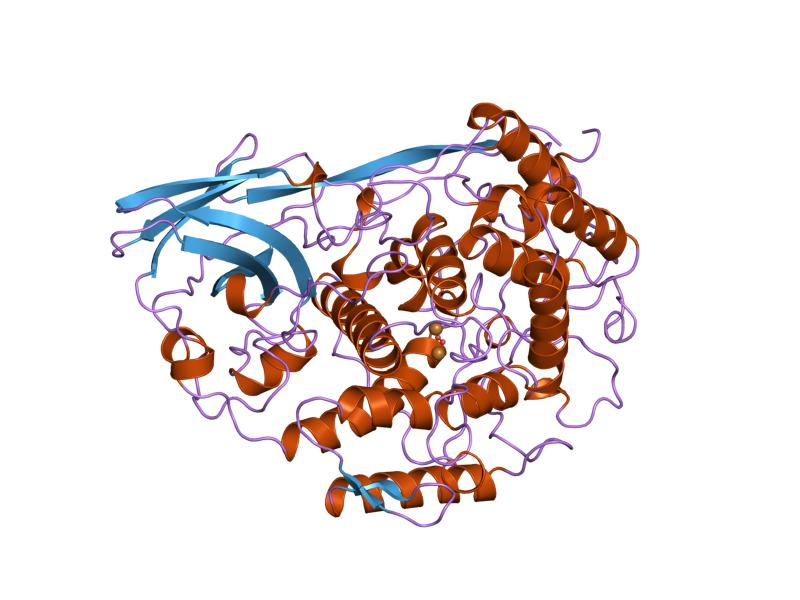
- crystallographic analysis of oxygenated and deoxygenated states of arthropod hemocyanin shows unusual differences

Identifiers
- Symbol: Hemocyanin_C
- Pfam: PF03723
- InterPro: IPR005203
- PROSITE: PDOC00184
- SCOP2: 1lla / SCOPe / SUPFAM
Available protein structures:
- PDB: IPR005203 PF03723 (ECOD; PDBsum)
- AlphaFold: IPR005203; PF03723

Hemocyanins (also spelled haemocyanins and abbreviated Hc) are proteins that transport oxygen throughout the bodies of some invertebrate animals. These metalloproteins contain two copper atoms that reversibly bind a single oxygen molecule (O_{2}). They are second only to hemoglobin in frequency of use as an oxygen transport molecule. Unlike the hemoglobin in red blood cells found in vertebrates, hemocyanins are not confined in blood cells, but are instead suspended directly in the hemolymph. Oxygenation causes a color change between the colorless Cu(I) deoxygenated form and the blue Cu(II) oxygenated form.

== Species distribution ==
Hemocyanin was first discovered in Octopus vulgaris by Leon Fredericq in 1878. The presence of copper in molluscs was detected even earlier by Bartolomeo Bizio in 1833. Hemocyanins are found in the Mollusca and Arthropoda, including cephalopods and crustaceans, and utilized by some land arthropods such as the tarantula Eurypelma californicum, the emperor scorpion, and the centipede Scutigera coleoptrata. Also, larval storage proteins in many insects appear to be derived from hemocyanins.

== The hemocyanin superfamily ==
The arthropod hemocyanin superfamily is composed of phenoloxidases, hexamerins, pseudohemocyanins or cryptocyanins, and (dipteran) hexamerin receptors.

Phenoloxidase are copper-containing tyrosinases. These proteins are involved in the process of sclerotization of arthropod cuticle, in wound healing, and humoral immune defense. Phenoloxidase is synthesized by zymogens and are activated by cleaving an N-terminal peptide.

Hexamerins are storage proteins commonly found in insects. These proteins are synthesized by the larval fat body and are associated with molting cycles or nutritional conditions.

Pseudohemocyanin and cryptocyanins genetic sequences are closely related to hemocyanins in crustaceans. These proteins have a similar structure and function, but lack the copper binding sites.

The evolutionary changes within the phylogeny of the hemocyanin superfamily are closely related to the emergence of these different proteins in various species. The proteins within this superfamily would not be well understood without the extensive studies of hemocyanin in arthropods.

== Structure and mechanism ==
Although the respiratory function of hemocyanin is similar to that of hemoglobin, there are a significant number of differences in its molecular structure and mechanism. Whereas hemoglobin carries its iron atoms in porphyrin rings (heme groups), the copper atoms of hemocyanin are bound as prosthetic groups coordinated by histidine residues. Each hemocyanin monomer holds a pair of copper(I) cations in place via interactions with the imidazole rings of six histidine residues. It has been noted that species using hemocyanin for oxygen transportation include crustaceans living in cold environments with low oxygen pressure. Under these circumstances hemoglobin oxygen transportation is less efficient than hemocyanin oxygen transportation. Nevertheless, there are also terrestrial arthropods using hemocyanin, notably spiders and scorpions, that live in warm climates. The molecule is conformationally stable and fully functioning at temperatures up to 90 degrees C.

Most hemocyanins bind with oxygen non-cooperatively and are roughly one-fourth as efficient as hemoglobin at transporting oxygen per amount of blood. Hemoglobin binds oxygen cooperatively due to steric conformation changes in the protein complex, which increases hemoglobin's affinity for oxygen when partially oxygenated. In some hemocyanins of horseshoe crabs and some other species of arthropods, cooperative binding is observed, with Hill coefficients of 1.6–3.0. Hill coefficients vary depending on species and laboratory measurement settings. Hemoglobin, for comparison, has a Hill coefficient of usually 2.8–3.0. In these cases of cooperative binding hemocyanin was arranged in protein sub-complexes of 6 subunits (hexamer) each with one oxygen binding site; binding of oxygen on one unit in the complex would increase the affinity of the neighboring units. Each hexamer complex was arranged together to form a larger complex of dozens of hexamers. In one study, cooperative binding was found to be dependent on hexamers being arranged together in the larger complex, suggesting cooperative binding between hexamers. Hemocyanin oxygen-binding profile is also affected by dissolved salt ion levels and pH.

Hemocyanin is made of many individual subunit proteins, each of which contains two copper atoms and can bind one oxygen molecule (O_{2}). Each subunit weighs about 75 kilodaltons (kDa). Subunits may be arranged in dimers or hexamers depending on species; the dimer or hexamer complex is likewise arranged in chains or clusters with weights exceeding 1500 kDa. The subunits are usually homogeneous, or heterogeneous with two variant subunit types. Because of the large size of hemocyanin, it is usually found free-floating in the blood, unlike hemoglobin.

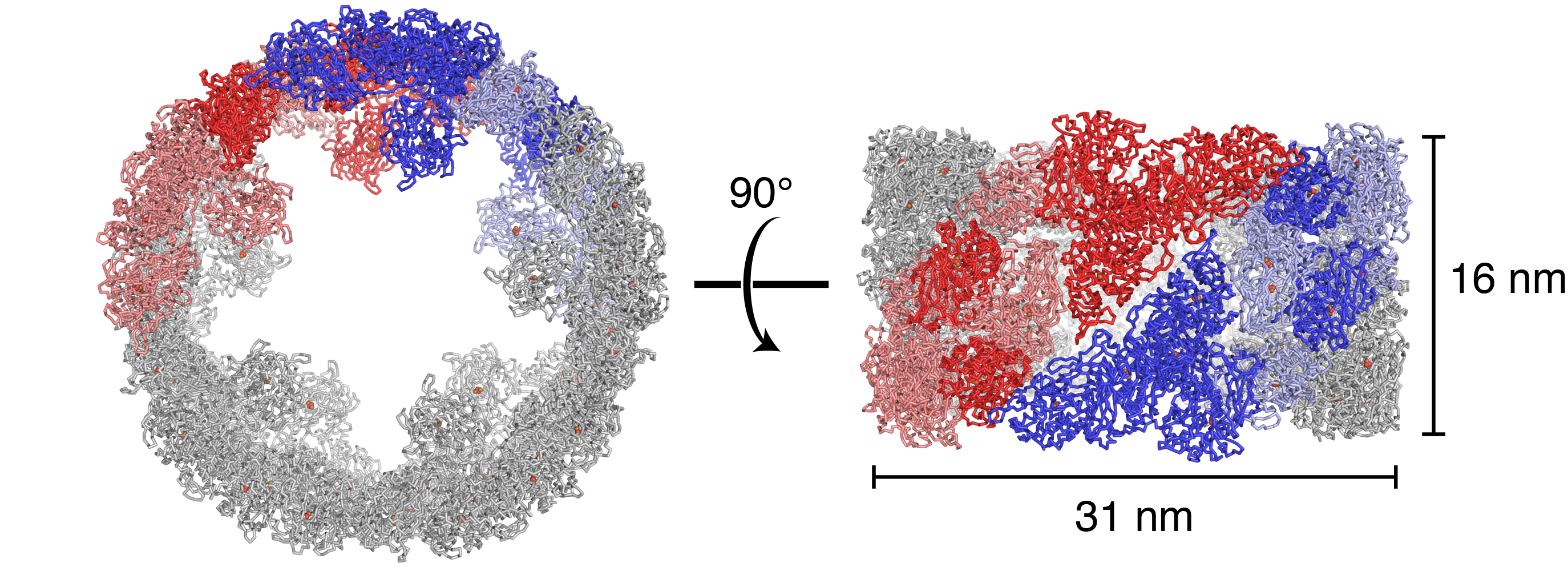
The 3.8 MDa structure of molluscan Japanese flying squid hemocyanin. It is a homodecamer of five dimers arranged into a 31 nm diameter cylinder. Each monomer has a string of eight individual subunits each with a Cu_{2}O_{2} binding site. PDB: 4YD9

Hexamers are characteristic of arthropod hemocyanins. A hemocyanin of the tarantula Eurypelma californicum is made up of 4 hexamers or 24 peptide chains. A hemocyanin from the house centipede Scutigera coleoptrata is made up of 6 hexamers or 36 chains. Horseshoe crabs have an 8-hexamer (i. e. 48-chain) hemocyanin. Simple hexamers are found in the spiny lobster Panulirus interruptus and the isopod Bathynomus giganteus. Peptide chains in crustaceans are about 660 amino acid residues long, and in chelicerates they are about 625. In the large complexes there is a variety of variant chains, all about the same length; pure components do not usually self-assemble.

== Catalytic activity ==
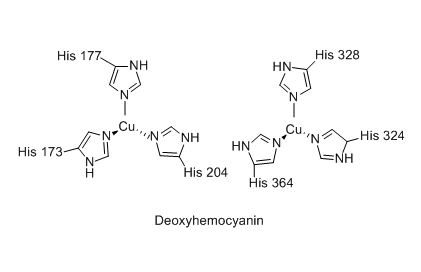
A hemocyanin active site in the absence of O_{2} (each Cu center is a cation, charges not shown).

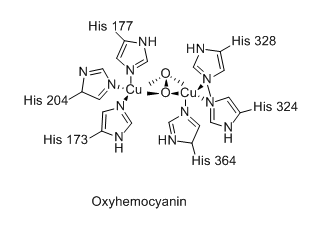
O_{2}-bound form of a hemocyanin active site (the Cu_{2} center is a dication, charge not shown).

Hemocyanin is homologous to the phenol oxidases (e.g. tyrosinase) since both proteins have histidine residues, called "type 3" copper-binding coordination centers, as do the enzymes tyrosinase and catechol oxidase. In both cases inactive precursors to the enzymes (also called zymogens or proenzymes) must be activated first. This is done by removing the amino acid that blocks the entrance channel to the active site when the proenzyme is not active. There are currently no other known modifications necessary to activate the proenzyme and enable catalytic activity. Conformational differences determine the type of catalytic activity that the hemocyanin is able to perform. Hemocyanin also exhibits phenol oxidase activity, but with slowed kinetics from greater steric bulk at the active site. Partial denaturation actually improves hemocyanin's phenol oxidase activity by providing greater access to the active site.

== Spectral properties ==
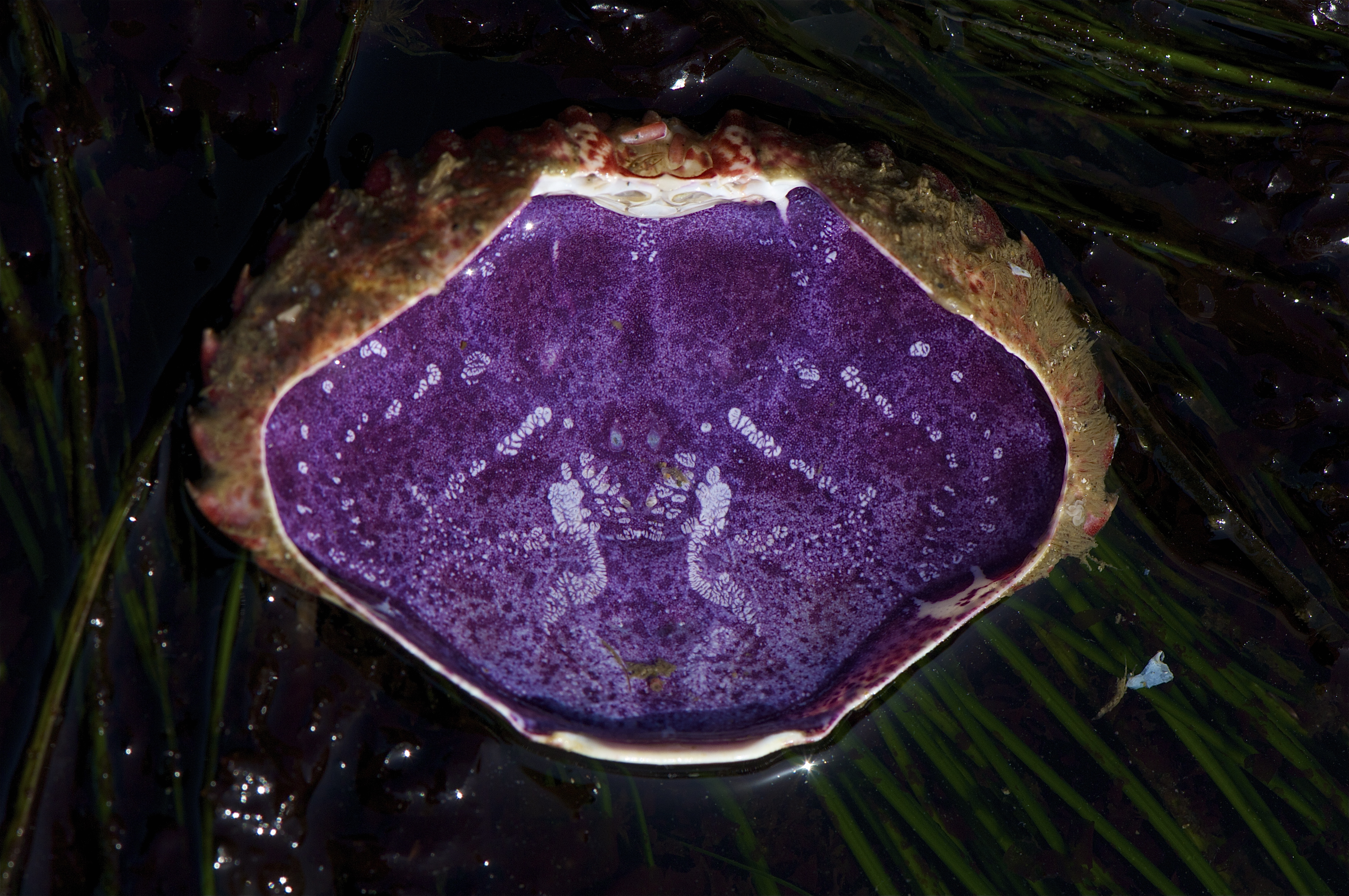
The underside of the carapace of a red rock crab (Cancer productus). The purple coloring is caused by hemocyanin.

Spectroscopy of oxyhemocyanin shows several salient features:

1. Resonance Raman spectroscopy shows that O_{2} is bound in a symmetric environment (ν(O-O) is not IR-allowed).
2. OxyHc is EPR-silent indicating the absence of unpaired electrons
3. Raman spectroscopy shows ν(O-O) of 755 cm^{−1}

Much work has been devoted to preparing synthetic analogues of the active site of hemocyanin. One such model, which features a pair of copper centers bridged side-on by peroxo ligand, shows ν(O-O) at 741 cm^{−1} and a UV-Vis spectrum with absorbances at 349 and 551 nm. Both of these measurements agree with the experimental observations for oxyHc. The Cu-Cu separation in the model complex is 3.56 Å, that of oxyhemocyanin is ca. 3.6 Å (deoxyHc: ca. 4.6 Å).

== Anticancer effects ==
The hemocyanin found in the blood of the Chilean abalone, Concholepas concholepas, has immunotherapeutic effects against bladder cancer in murine models. Mice treated with C. concholepas hemocyanin, before implantation of bladder tumor (MBT-2) cells, showed antitumor effects: prolonged survival, decreased tumor growth and incidence, and lack of toxic effects. This may have potential use in future immunotherapy for superficial bladder cancer.

Keyhole limpet hemocyanin (KLH) is an immune stimulant derived from circulating glycoproteins of the marine mollusk Megathura crenulata. KLH has been shown to be a significant treatment against the proliferations of breast cancer, pancreatic cancer, and prostate cancer cells when delivered in vitro. Keyhole limpet hemocyanin inhibits growth of human Barrett's esophageal cancer through both apoptotic and nonapoptotic mechanisms of cell death.

== Case studies: environmental impact on hemocyanin levels ==
A 2003 study of the effect of culture conditions of blood metabolites and hemocyanin of the white shrimp Litopenaeus vannamei found that the levels of hemocyanin, oxyhemocyanin in particular, are affected by the diet. The study compared oxyhemocyanin levels in the blood of white shrimp housed in an indoor pond with a commercial diet with that of white shrimp housed in an outdoor pond with a more readily available protein source (natural live food) as well. Oxyhemocyanin and blood glucose levels were higher in shrimp housed in outdoor ponds. It was also found that blood metabolite levels tended to be lower in low activity level species, such as crabs, lobsters, and the indoor shrimp when compared to the outdoor shrimp. This correlation is possibly indicative of the morphological and physiological evolution of crustaceans. The levels of these blood proteins and metabolites appear to be dependent on energetic demands and availability of those energy sources.

== See also ==
- Myoglobin
- Respiratory pigment
