= Food browning =

Chemical process

Enzymatic browning (oxidize): Fuji apple - 32 minutes in 16 seconds (video).

Browning is the processes of food turning brown due to the chemical reactions that take place within. The process of browning is one of the chemical reactions that take place in food chemistry and represents an interesting research topic regarding health, nutrition, and food technology. Though there are many different ways food chemically changes over time, browning in particular falls into two main categories: enzymatic versus non-enzymatic browning processes.

Browning has many important implications on the food industry relating to nutrition, technology, and economic cost. Researchers are especially interested in studying the control (inhibition) of browning and the different methods that can be employed to maximize this inhibition and ultimately prolong the shelf life of food.

== Enzymatic browning ==
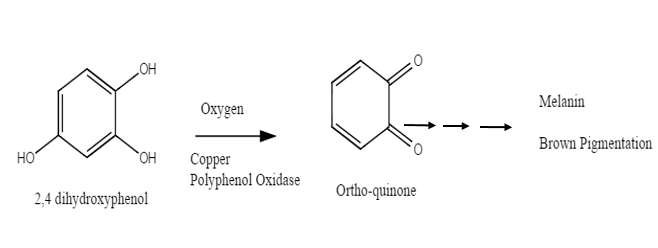
Example of a general reaction of polyphenols by polyphenol oxidase (PPO) that catalyzes enzymatic browning. The production of quinones undergoes more reactions which eventually form brown pigments on the surface of the food.

Enzymatic browning is one of the most important reactions that takes place in most fruits and vegetables as well as in seafood. These processes affect the taste, color, and value of such foods. Generally, it is a chemical reaction involving polyphenol oxidase (PPO), catechol oxidase, and other enzymes that create melanins and benzoquinone from natural phenols. Enzymatic browning (also called oxidation of foods) requires exposure to oxygen. It begins with the oxidation of phenols by polyphenol oxidase into quinones, whose strong electrophilic state causes high susceptibility to a nucleophilic attack from other proteins. These quinones are then polymerized in a series of reactions, eventually resulting in the formation of brown pigments (melanosis) on the surface of the food. The rate of enzymatic browning is reflected by the amount of active polyphenol oxidases present in the food. Hence, most research into methods of preventing enzymatic browning has been directed towards inhibiting polyphenol oxidase activity. However, not all browning of food produces negative effects.

Examples of beneficial enzymatic browning:

- Developing color and flavor in coffee, cocoa beans, and tea.
- Developing color and flavor in dried fruit such as figs and raisins.

Examples of non-beneficial enzymatic browning:

- Fresh fruit and vegetables, including apples, potatoes, bananas and avocados.
- Oxidation of polyphenols is the major cause of melanosis in crustaceans such as shrimp.

== Control of enzymatic browning ==
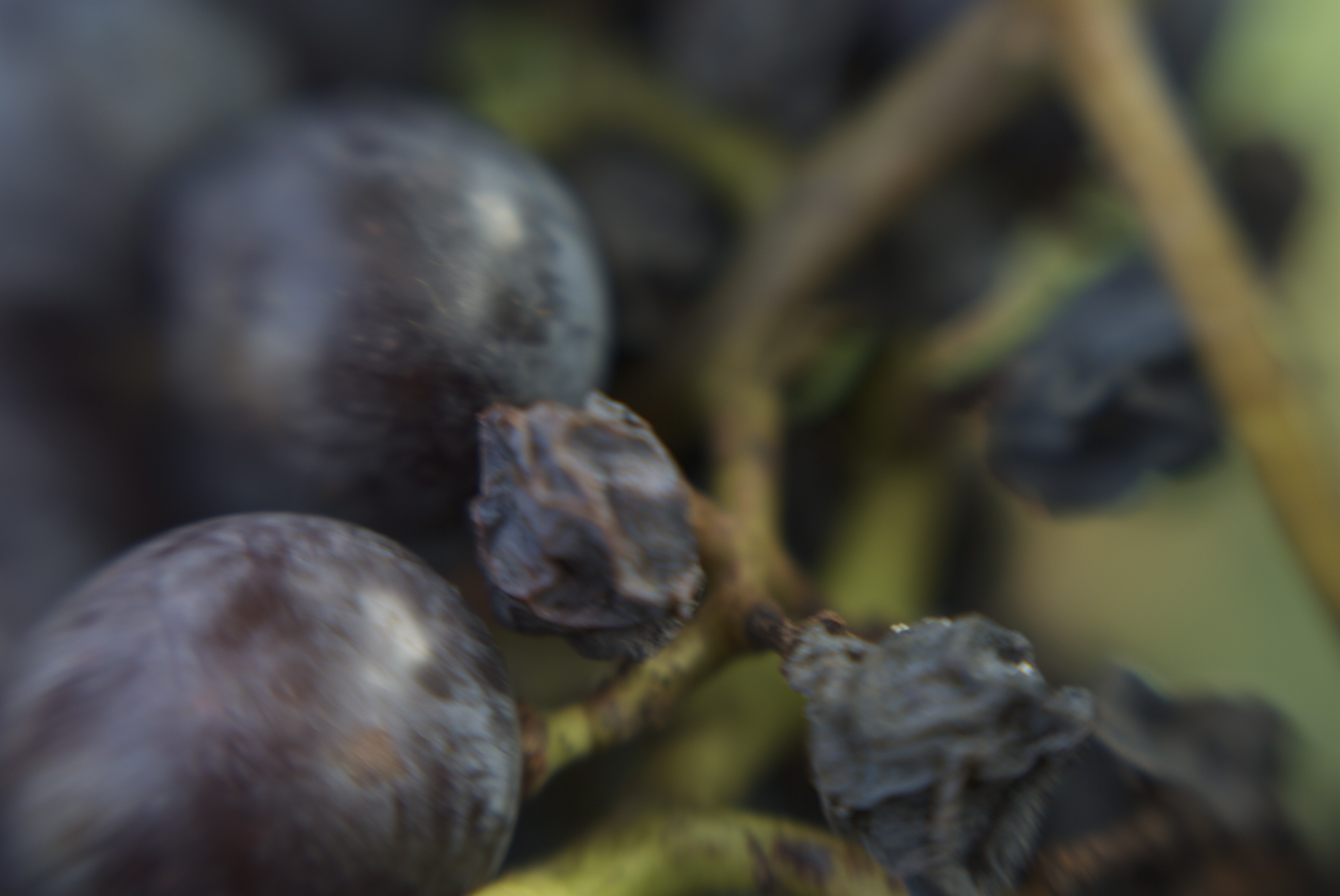
A desirable enzymatic browning reaction is involved in the process of grapes becoming raisins.

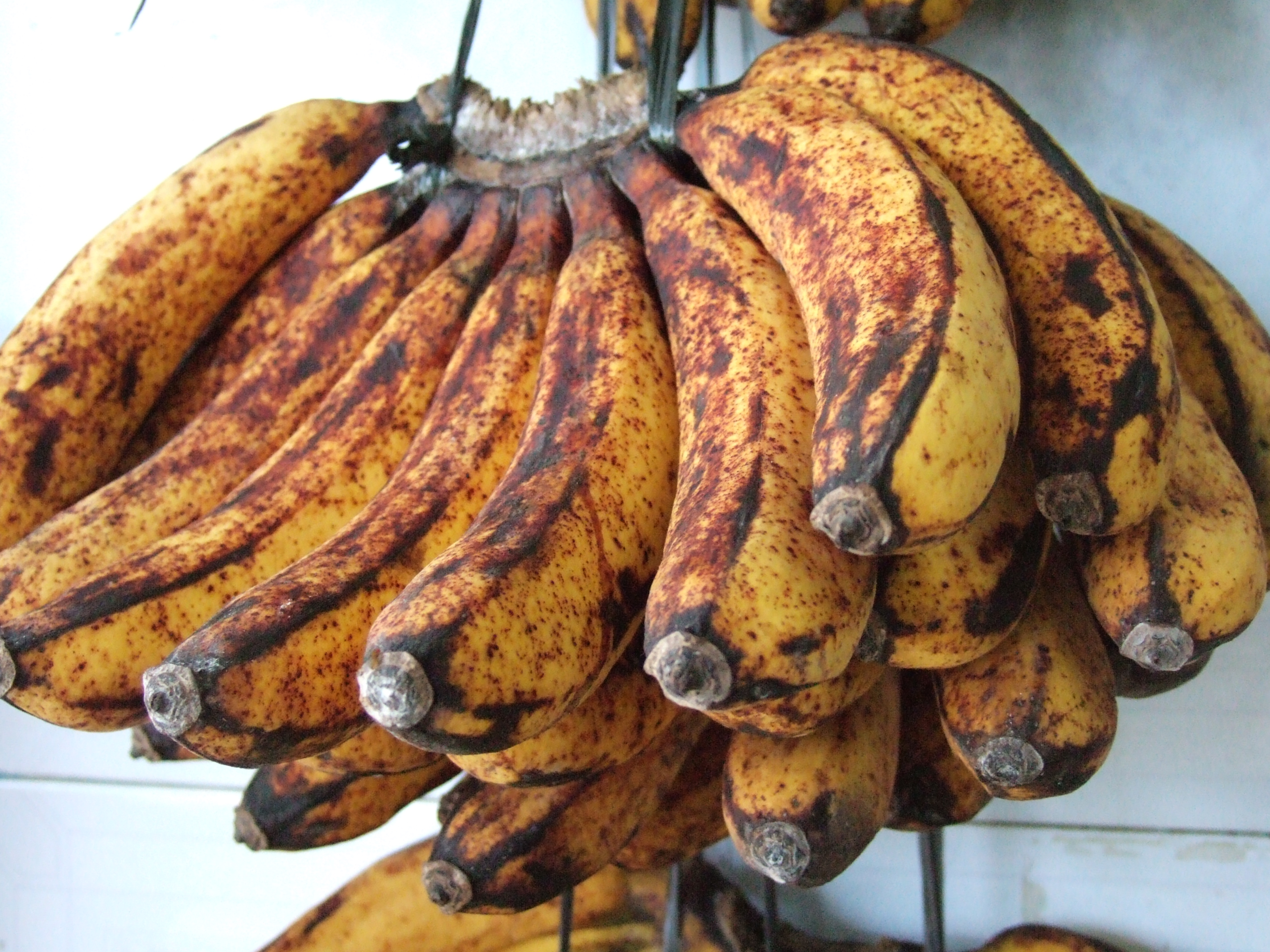
A non-desirable enzymatic browning reaction is involved in the formation of brown spots on the peel of bananas.

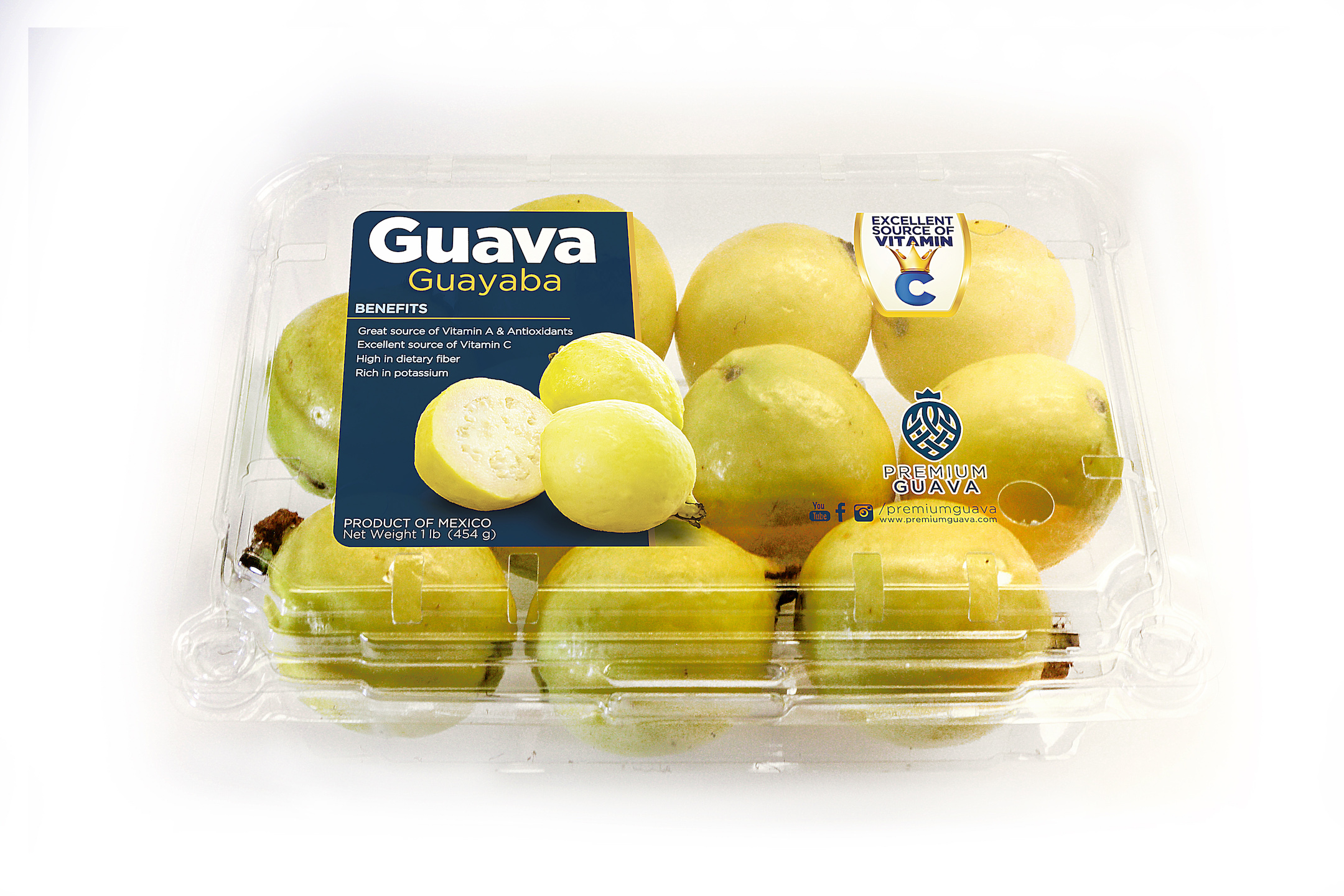
Irradiated guava

The control of enzymatic browning has always been a challenge for the food industry. A variety of approaches are used to prevent or slow down enzymatic browning of foods, each method aimed at targeting specific steps of the chemical reaction. The different types of enzymatic browning control can be classified into two large groups: physical and chemical. Usually, multiple methods are used. The use of sulfites (powerful anti-browning chemicals) have been reconsidered due to the potential hazards that it causes along with its activity. Much research has been conducted regarding the exact types of control mechanisms that take place when confronted with the enzymatic process. Besides prevention, control over browning also includes measures intended to recover the food color after its browning. For instance, ion exchange filtration or ultrafiltration can be used in winemaking to remove the brown color sediments in the solution.

=== Physical methods ===
- Heat treatment − Treating food with heat, such as blanching or roasting, de-naturates enzymes and destroys the reactants responsible for browning. Blanching is used, for example, in winemaking, tea processing, storing nuts and bacon, and preparing vegetables for freezing preservation. Meat is often partially browned under high heat before being incorporated into a larger preparation to be cooked at a lower temperature which produces less browning.
- Cold treatment − Refrigeration and freezing are the most common ways of storing food, preventing decay. The activity of browning enzymes, i.e., rate of reaction, drops in low temperatures. Thus, refrigeration helps to keep the initial look, color, and flavour of fresh vegetables and fruits. Refrigeration is also used during distribution and retailing of fruits and vegetables.
- Oxygen elimination − Presence of oxygen is crucial for enzymatic browning, therefore eliminating oxygen from the environment helps to slow down the browning reaction. Withdrawing air or replacing it with other gases (e.g., N_{2} or CO_{2}) during preservation, such as in vacuum-packaging or modified atmosphere packaging, wine or juice bottling, using impermeable films or edible coatings, dipping into salt or sugar solutions, keeps the food away from direct contact with oxygen. Impermeable films made of plastic or other materials prevent food being exposed to oxygen in the air and avoid moisture loss. There is an increasing activity in developing packaging materials impregnated with antioxidants, antimicrobial, and antifungal substances, such as butylated hydroxytoluene (BHT) and butylated hydroxyanisole (BHA), tocopherols, hinokitiol, lysozyme, nisin, natamycin, chitosan, and ε-polylysine. Edible coatings can be made of polysaccharides, proteins, lipids, vegetable skins, plants or other natural products.
- Irradiation − Food irradiation using UV-C, gamma rays, x-rays, and electron beams is another method to extend the food shelf life. Ionizing radiation inhibits the vitality of microorganisms responsible for food spoilage and delays the maturation and sprouting of preserving vegetables and fruits.

=== Chemical methods ===
- Acidification − Browning enzymes, as other enzymes, are active at a specific range of pH. For example, PPO shows optimal activity at pH 5-7 and is inhibited below pH 3. Acidifying agents and acidity regulators are widely used as food additives to maintain a desired pH in food products. Acidulants, such as citric acid, ascorbic acid, and glutathione, are used as anti-browning agents. Many of these agents also show other anti-browning effects, such as chelating and antioxidant activities.

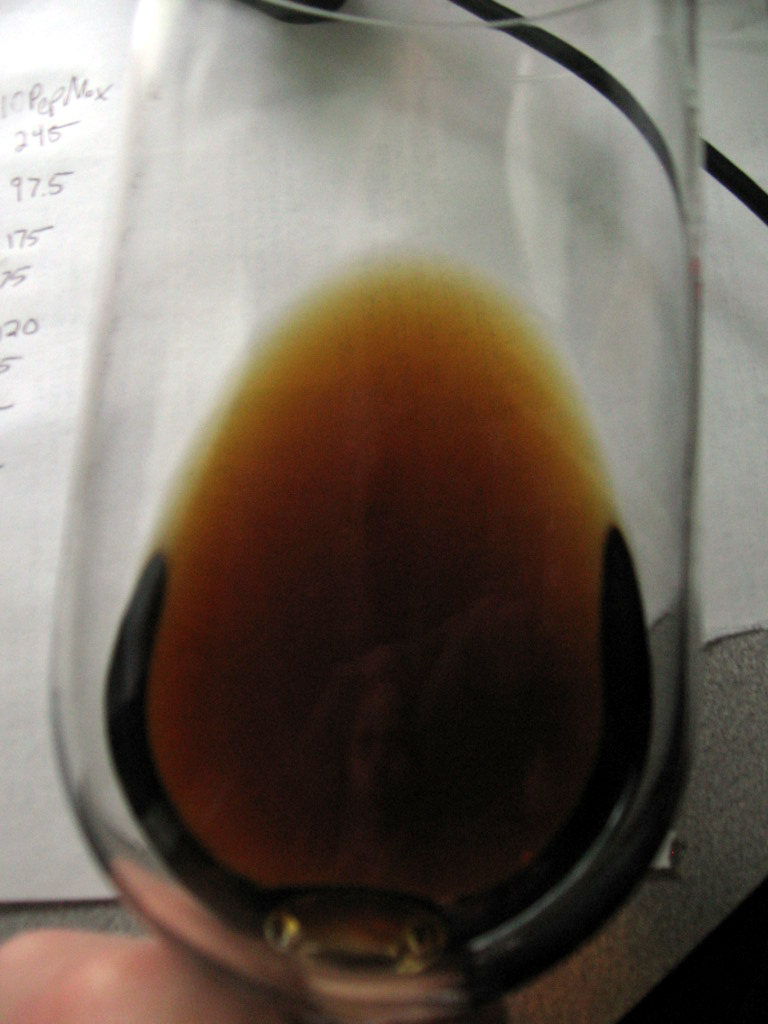
Aged white wine with brown color

- Antioxidants − Many antioxidants are used in food industry as food additives. These compounds react with oxygen and suppress the initiation of the browning process. Also, they interfere with intermediate products of the following reactions and inhibit melanin formation. Ascorbic acid, N-acetylcysteine, L-cysteine, 4-hexylresorcinol, erythorbic acid, cysteine hydrochloride, glutathione are examples of antioxidants that have been studied for their anti-browning properties.
- Chelating agents − Polyphenol oxidase requires copper as a cofactor for its functionality, thus copper-chelating agents inhibit the activity of this enzyme. Many agents possessing chelating activity have been studied and used in different fields of food industry, such as citric acid, sorbic acid, polyphosphates, hinokitiol, kojic acid, EDTA, porphyrins, polycarboxylic acids, different proteins. Some of these compounds also have other anti-browning effects, such as acidifying or antioxidant. Hinokitiol is used in coating materials for food packaging.

=== Other methods ===
- Natural agents − Different natural products and their extracts, such as onion, pineapple, lemon, and white wine, are known to inhibit or slow the browning of some products. Onion and its extract exhibit potent anti-browning properties by inhibiting the PPO activity. Pineapple juice have shown to possess anti-browning effect on apples and bananas. Lemon juice is used in making doughs to make the pastry products look brighter. This effect is possibly explained by the anti-browning properties of citric and ascorbic acids in the lemon juice.
- Genetic modification − Arctic apples have been genetically modified to silence the expression of PPO, thereby delaying the browning effect, and improving apple quality.

== Non-enzymatic browning ==
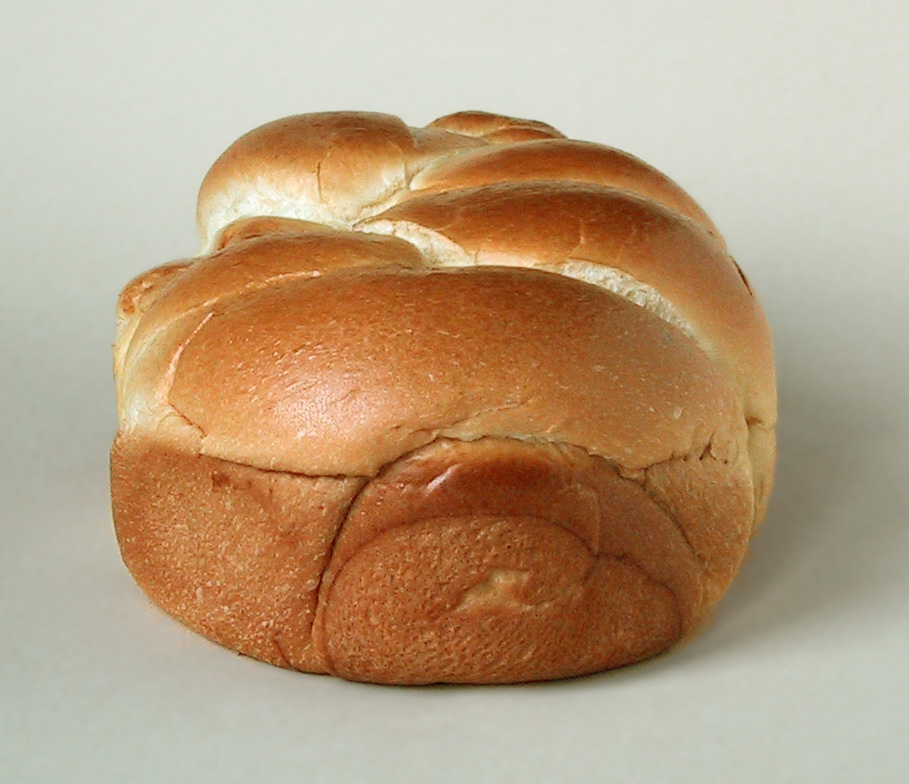
The crust of brioche bread, which is golden-brown due to the Maillard reaction

The second type of browning, non-enzymatic browning, is a process that also produces the brown pigmentation in foods but without the activity of enzymes. The two main forms of non-enzymatic browning are caramelization and the Maillard reaction. Both vary in the reaction rate as a function of water activity (in food chemistry, the standard state of water activity is most often defined as the partial vapor pressure of pure water at the same temperature).

Caramelization is a process involving the pyrolysis of sugar. It is used extensively in cooking for the desired nutty flavor and brown color. As the process occurs, volatile chemicals are released, producing the characteristic caramel flavor.

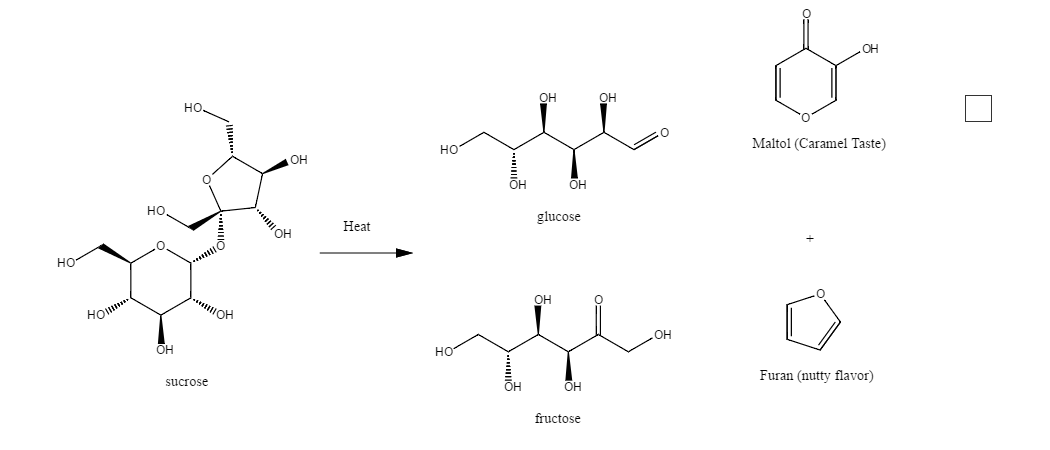
Example caramelization of table sugar (sucrose) caramelizing to a brown nutty flavor substance (furan and maltol)

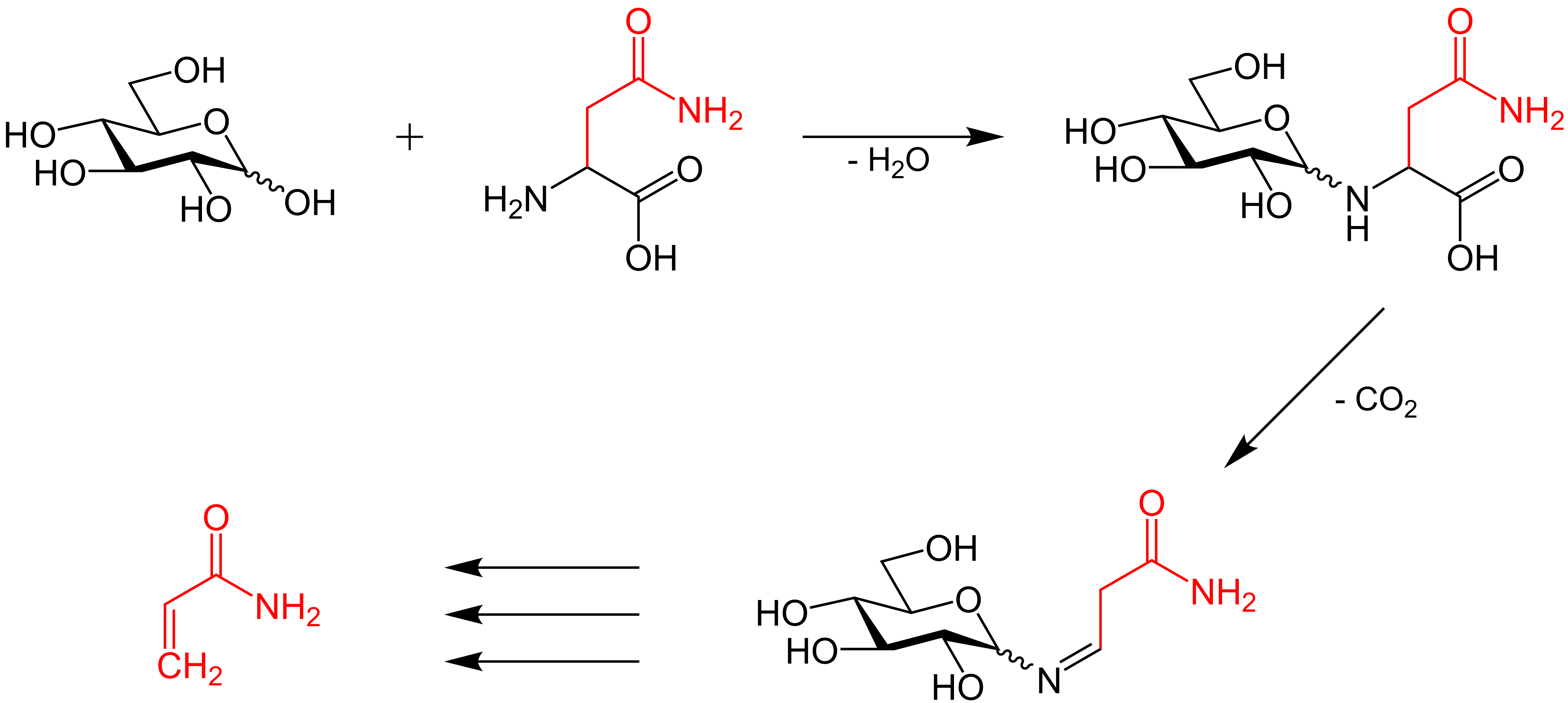
Overview of the mechanism of non-enzymatic Maillard reaction in foods. The Schiff base loses a CO_{2} molecule and adds to water. Notice the interaction between the amine group of the amino acid (asparagine here) and the carbonyl carbon of the sugar (glucose). The end product is acrylamide. For more information, visit Maillard reaction.

The other non-enzymatic reaction is the Maillard reaction, also responsible for developing flavors in food during the cooking process. Examples of foods that undergo Maillard reaction include breads, steaks, and potatoes. It is a chemical reaction that takes place between the amine group of a free amino acid and the carbonyl group of a reducing sugar, usually with the addition of heat. The sugar interacts with the amino acid, producing a variety of odors and flavors. The Maillard reaction is the basis for producing artificial flavors for processed foods in the flavoring industry since the type of amino acid involved determines the resulting flavor.

Melanoidins are brown, high molecular weight heterogeneous polymers that are formed when sugars and amino acids combine through the Maillard reaction at high temperatures and low water activity. Melanoidins are commonly present in foods that have undergone some form of non-enzymatic browning, such as barley malts (Vienna and Munich), bread crust, bakery products and coffee. They are also present in the wastewater of sugar refineries, necessitating treatment in order to avoid contamination around the outflow of these refineries.

== Browning of grapes during winemaking ==
Like most fruit, grapes vary in the number of phenolic compounds they have. This characteristic is used as a parameter in judging the quality of the wine. The general process of winemaking is initiated by the enzymatic oxidation of phenolic compounds by polyphenol oxidases. Contact between the phenolic compounds in the vacuole of the grape cell and the polyphenol oxidase enzyme (located in the cytoplasm) triggers the oxidation of the grape. Thus, the initial browning of grapes occurs as a result of "compartmentalization modification" in the cells of the grape.

== Implications in food industry and technology ==
Enzymatic browning affects the color, flavor, and nutritional value of foods, causing huge economic loss when not sold to consumers on time. It is estimated that more than 50% of produce is lost as a result of enzymatic browning. The increase in human population and consequential depletion in natural resources has prompted many biochemists and food engineers alike to find new or improved techniques to preserve food and for longer by using methods to inhibit the browning reaction. This effectively increases the shelf life of foods, solving this part of the waste problem. A better understanding of the enzymatic browning mechanisms, specifically, understanding the properties of the enzymes and substrates that are involved in the reaction may help food technologists to control certain stages in the mechanism and ultimately apply that knowledge to inhibit browning.

Apples are fruits commonly studied by researchers due to their high phenolic content, which make them highly susceptible to enzymatic browning. In accordance with other findings regarding apples and browning activity, a correlation has been found between higher phenolic quantities and increased enzymatic activity in apples. This provides a potential target and thus hope for food industries wishing to genetically modify foods to decrease polyphenol oxidase activity and thus decrease browning. An example of such accomplishments in food engineering is in the production of Arctic apples. These apples, engineered by Okanagan Specialty Fruits Inc, are a result of applying gene splicing, a laboratory technique that has allowed for the reduction in polyphenol oxidase.

Another type of issue that is closely studied is the browning of seafood. Seafood, in particular shrimp, is a staple consumed by people all over the world. The browning of shrimp, which is actually referred to as melanosis, creates a great concern for food handlers and consumers. Melanosis mainly occurs during postmortem handling and refrigerated storage. Recent studies have found a plant extract that acts as an anti-melatonin polyphenol oxidase inhibitor serves the same function as sulfites but without the health risks.

== See also ==
- Decomposition
- Gravy
- Water activity
