= Prophenoloxidase =

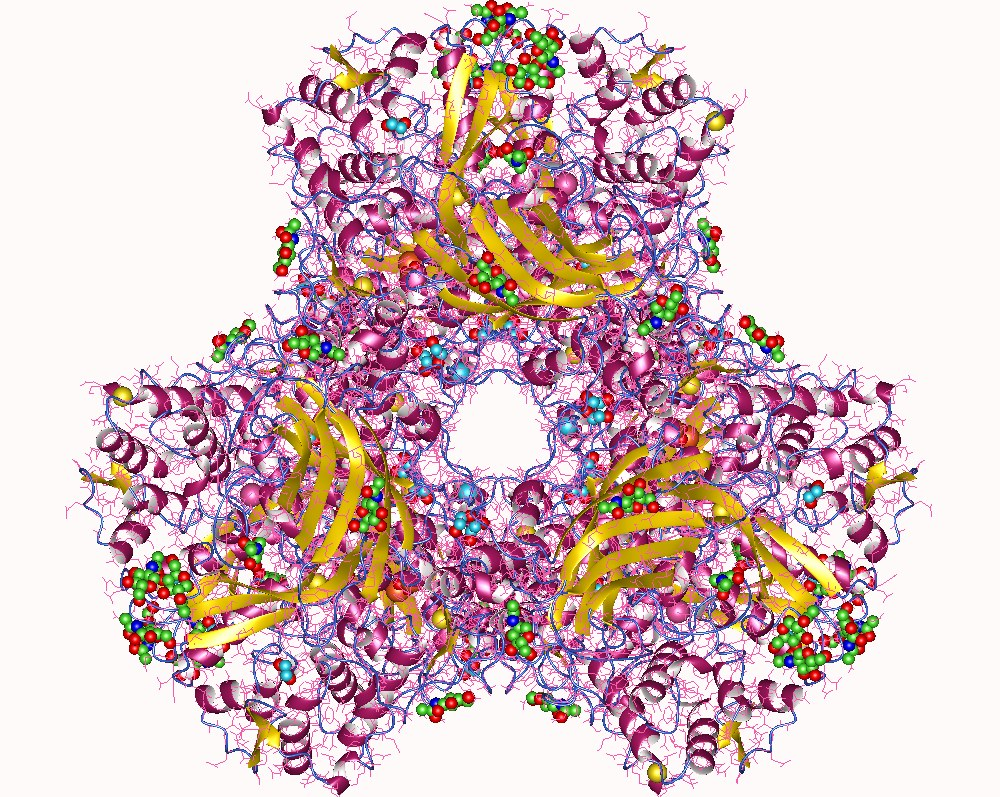
Prophenoloxidase b hexamer, Marsupenaeus japonicus.

Prophenoloxidase (proPO) is a modified form of the complement response found in some invertebrates, including insects, crabs and worms. It is a copper-containing metalloprotein.

A major innate defense system in invertebrates is the melanization of pathogens and damaged tissues. This important process is controlled by the enzyme phenoloxidase (PO). The conversion of prophenoloxidase to the active form of the enzyme can be brought about by minuscule amounts of molecules such as lipopolysaccharide, peptidoglycan and beta-1,3-glucans from microorganisms.

However, it still has many arguments in the innate immune function, especially in model invertebrate animal. The proPO homologous-protein in mammal also does not have any immune activity. Thus, it might be difficult to conclude its function in immunity.
