= Caramelization =

Process of browning of sugar

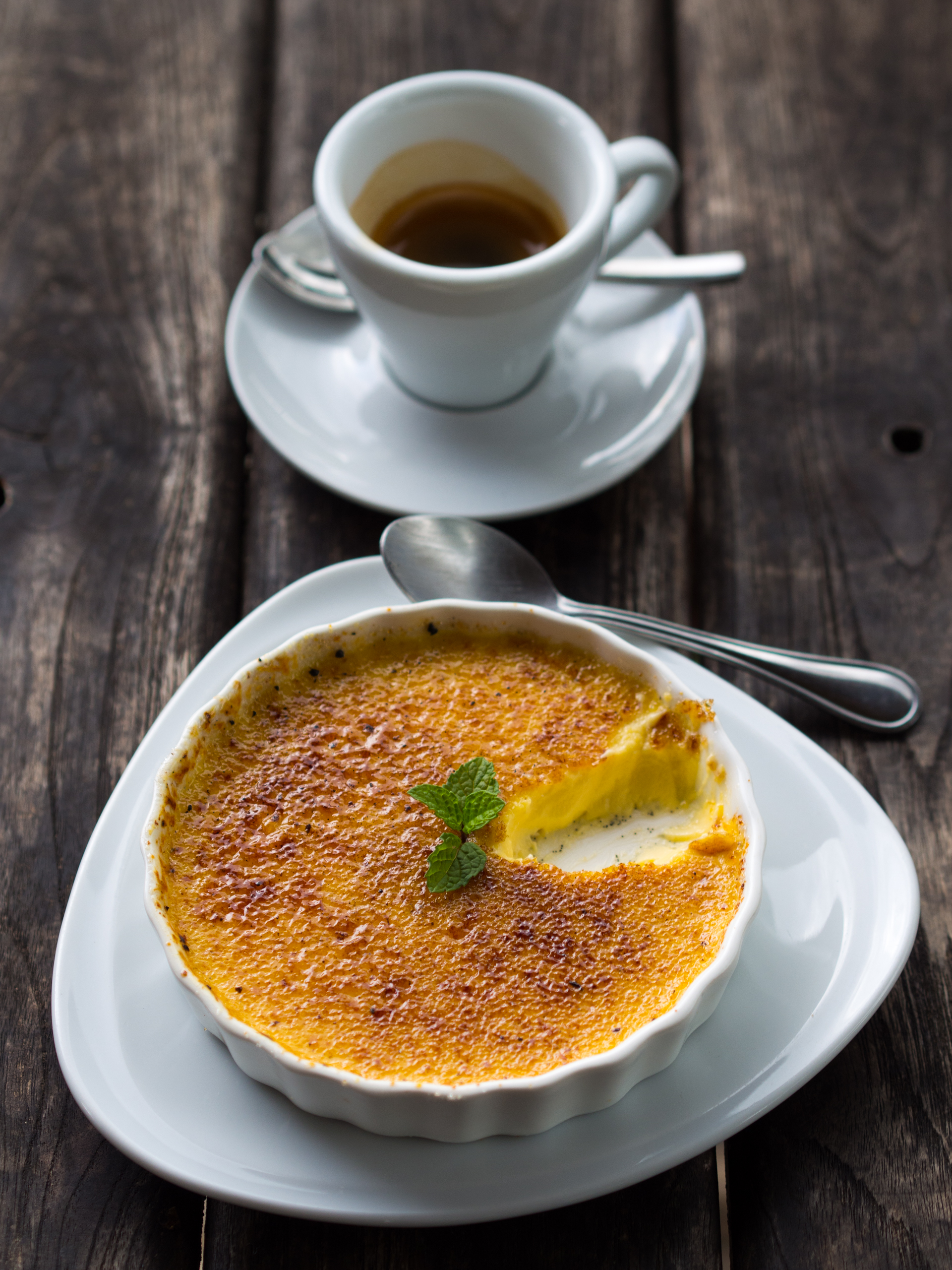
Caramelized crust on a crème brûlée

Caramelization is a process of browning of sugar used extensively in cooking for the resulting butter-like flavor and brown color. The brown colors are produced by three groups of polymers: caramelans (C_{24}H_{36}O_{18}), caramelens (C_{36}H_{50}O_{25}), and caramelins (C_{125}H_{188}O_{80}). As the process occurs, volatile chemicals such as diacetyl (known for its intense butter-like taste) are released, producing the characteristic caramel flavor.

Like the Maillard reaction, caramelization is a type of non-enzymatic browning. Unlike the Maillard reaction, caramelization is pyrolytic, as opposed to being a reaction with amino acids.

When caramelization involves the disaccharide sucrose, it is broken down into the monosaccharides fructose and glucose.

== Process ==
Caramelization is a complex, poorly understood process that produces hundreds of chemical products, and includes the following types of reactions:

- equilibration of anomeric and ring forms
- sucrose inversion to fructose and glucose
- condensation reactions
- intramolecular bonding
- isomerization of aldoses to ketoses
- dehydration reactions
- fragmentation reactions
- unsaturated polymer formation

== Effects ==
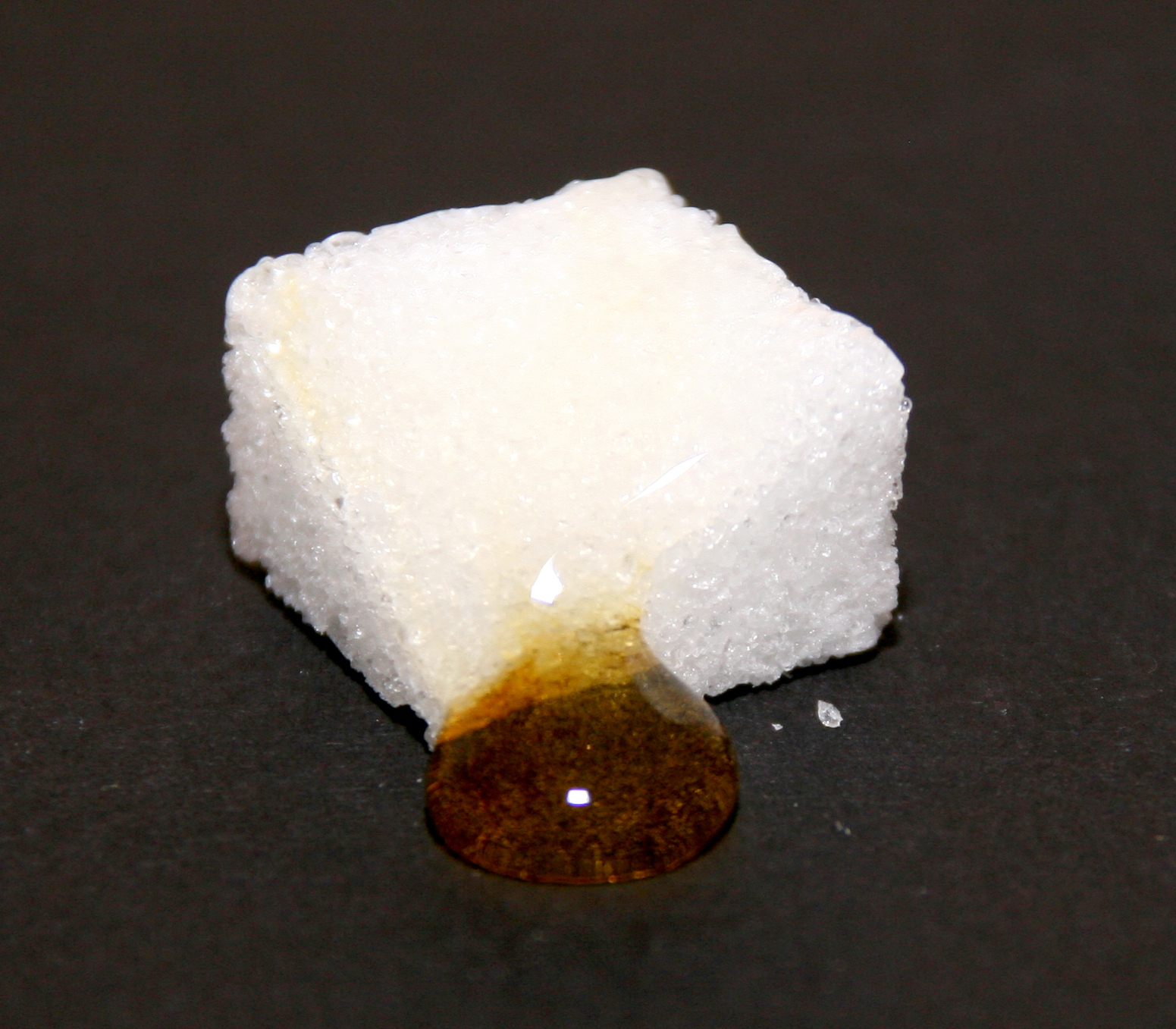
A partially caramelized lump of sugar

The process is temperature-dependent. Specific sugars each have their own point at which the reactions begin to proceed readily. Impurities in the sugar, such as the molasses remaining in brown sugar, greatly speed the reactions.

Caramelization temperatures
Sugar	Temperature
Fructose	105 °C (221 °F)
Galactose	160 °C (320 °F)
Glucose	150 °C (302 °F)
Sucrose	170 °C (338 °F)
Maltose	180 °C (360 °F)

Reactions are also sensitive to the chemical environment, and the reaction rate, or temperature at which reactions occur most readily, can be altered by controlling the level of acidity (pH). The rate of caramelization is generally lowest at near-neutral acidity (pH around 7), and accelerated under both acidic (especially pH below 3) and basic (especially pH above 9) conditions.

== Uses in food ==
- Caramel sauce, a sauce made with caramel
- Confiture de lait and dulce de leche, caramelized, sweetened milk
- Caramel candies
- Crème caramel, and the similar crème brûlée, a custard dish topped with sugar caramelized with a blowtorch
- Caramelized onions, which are used in dishes like French onion soup. Onions require 30 to 45 minutes of cooking to caramelize.
- Caramelized pears
- Cola, of which some brands use caramelized sugar in small amounts for color
- Latik, a sweet syrup made of sugar and coconut milk which is used in several Filipino desserts.
- Dodol, a type of toffee made with cane sugar, rice flour, and coconut milk originating from Indonesia.

== See also ==
- List of cooking techniques
