= Léon Fredericq =

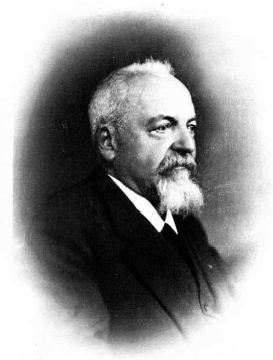

Léon Fredericq (24 August 1851 – 2 September 1935) was a Belgian physiologist. He conducted pioneering experiments on blood physiology, and discovered the copper-based hemocyanin of octopuses. He also examined gas-exchange, the working of the heart, and the transport of carbon dioxide and oxygen by blood. He served as a professor at the University of Liège from 1879.

== Life and work ==
Fredericq was born in Ghent where his father César Fredericq was a physician and his mother Mathilde Huet headed a boarding school for girls. He was educated in Ghent before joining the University of Ghent in 1868 to study science. He received a doctorate in 1871 and became a preparator in physiology at the faculty of medicine. He received an MD in 1875 and went to France studying under Louis-Antoine Ranvier, Georges Pouchet, Wilhelm Waldeyer, Ernst Tiegel, Felix Hoppe-Seyler and others. He also spent some time studying the nerve physiology of sea urchins at Roscoff under Henri de Lacaze-Duthiers. He examined blood coagulation in 1876 and then studied blood-gas analysis techniques under Paul Bert in Paris. He received a doctorate in physiology in 1878 for his work on blood coagulation and gases. He discovered hemocyanin in octopuses in 1878. In 1879 he studied nerve impulse transmission in lobsters and in the same year he succeeded Theodor Schwann as professor of physiology at the University of Liège. Fredericq conducted a number of studies, some tangential to his main field, driven by accidental discoveries. He tasted the blood of marine invertebrates and found them to be salty while bony fishes seemed to maintain a lower salt level which made him examine osmoregulation from 1901. He also examined thermoregulation and the relation to oxygen consumption. He introduced cross-circulation experiments with blood from the artery of one dog feeding into the arterial system of another. The air supply to one dog could then be altered to examine the effects of lung gas exchange in the other dog. Another area of research was on the mechanism of the heart.

Apart from work in physiology, he took an interest in art, travel, and natural history. He coined the term autotomy in 1883 based on his observations of invertebrates.

Fredericq married Bertha Spring, sister of the chemist Walthère Spring, in 1881. Their son Henri Fredericq (1887–1980) also became a physiologist who worked on nerve and muscle action. In 1929, the organizing committee of the 13th International Congress of Physiologists, held in Boston, invited him, along with Nobel Prize winner Ivan Pavlov, to participate in the sessions as guests of honor at the Congress, and in 1931 he was created baron by King Albert I. He received two nominations for the Nobel Prize in Physiology or Medicine in 1930.
