= Grape reaction product =

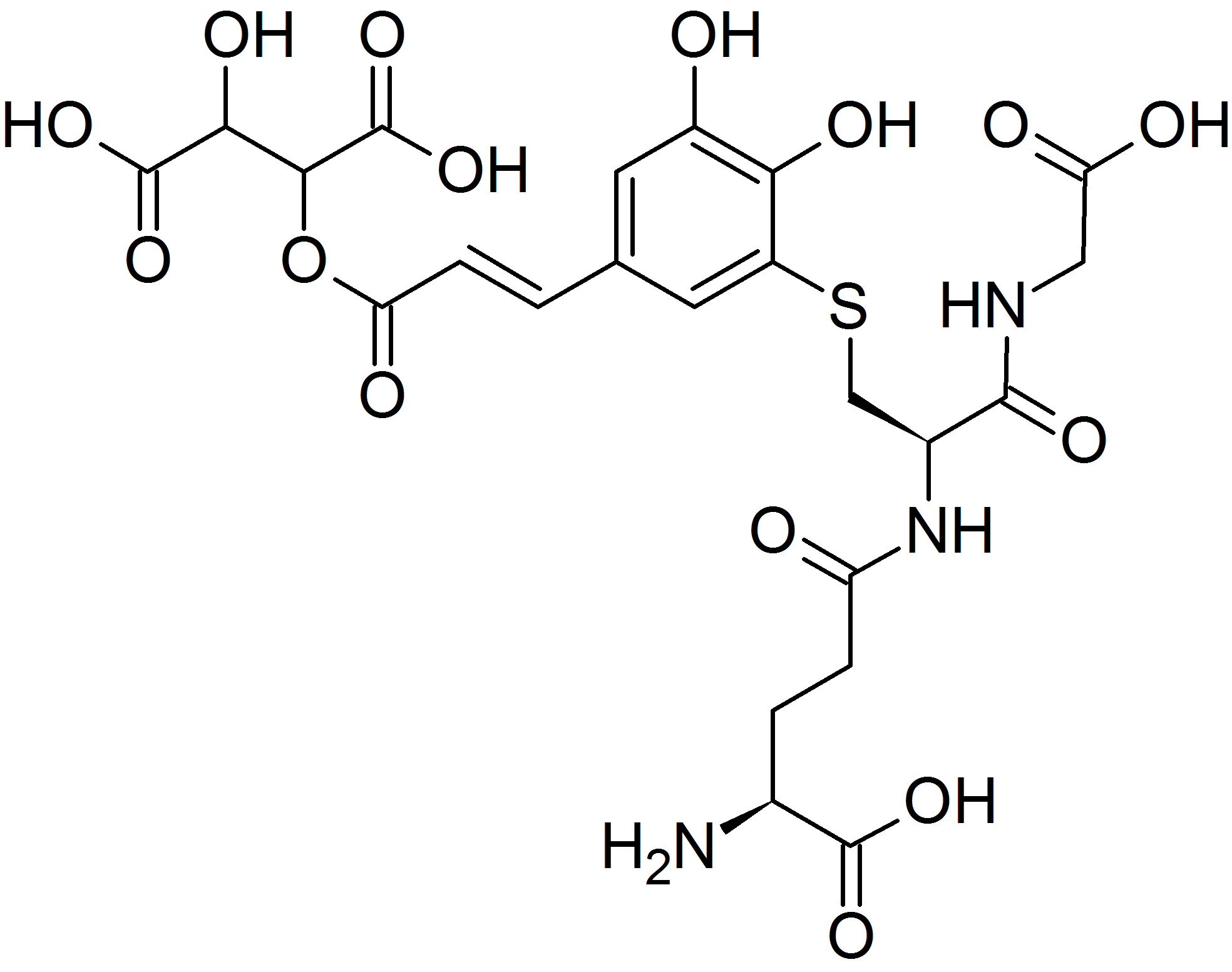
- Chemical structure of grape reaction product

Names
- IUPAC name 2-[(E)-3-[3-[2-[(4-amino-4-carboxybutanoyl)amino]-3-(carboxymethylamino)-3-oxopropyl]sulfanyl-4,5-dihydroxyphenyl]prop-2-enoyl]oxy-3-hydroxybutanedioic acid
- Other names GRP; GRP1; 2-S-Glutathionyl caftaric acid

Identifiers
3D model (JSmol)	Interactive image
ChEBI	CHEBI:147433
PubChem CID	71308212
- InChI: InChI=1S/C23H27N3O15S/c24-10(21(35)36)2-3-14(28)26-11(20(34)25-7-15(29)30)8-42-13-6-9(5-12(27)17(13)32)1-4-16(31)41-19(23(39)40)18(33)22(37)38/h1,4-6,10-11,18-19,27,32-33H,2-3,7-8,24H2,(H,25,34)(H,26,28)(H,29,30)(H,35,36)(H,37,38)(H,39,40)/b4-1+ Key: GYXGDEQYOIGEEQ-DAFODLJHSA-N
- SMILES: Oc1cc(cc(c1O)SCC(NC(=O)CCC(N)C(=O)O)C(=O)NCC(O)=O)\C=C\C(=O)OC(C(O)=O)C(O)C(O)=O

Properties
Chemical formula	C_{23}H_{27}N_{3}O_{15}S
Molar mass	617.54 g·mol^{−1}
- Except where otherwise noted, data are given for materials in their standard state (at 25 °C [77 °F], 100 kPa). verify (what is ?) Infobox references

The grape reaction product (GRP, GRP1 or 2-S-glutathionyl caftaric acid) is a phenolic compound explaining the disappearance of caftaric acid from grape must during processing. It is also found in aged red wines. Its enzymatic production by polyphenol oxidase is important in limiting the browning of musts, especially in white wine production. The product can be recreated in model solutions.

Determining its concentration in wine is possible by mass spectrometry.

S-Glutathionyl caftaric acid is itself oxidizable. It is not a substrate for grape polyphenol oxidase, but laccase from Botrytis cinerea can use it to form GRP2.

== Related molecules ==
Other related molecules are trans-caffeoyltartrate derivatives like GRP o-quinone and 2,5-di-S-glutathionyl cafteoyl tartrate (GRP2) or adducts with anthocyanidins.

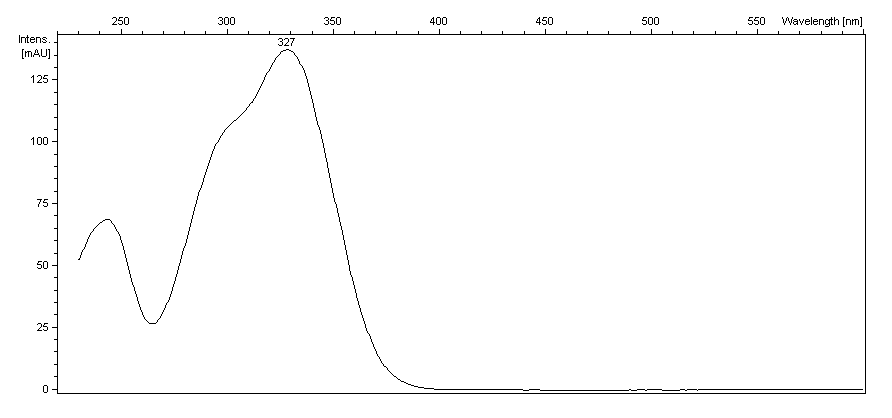
Caftaric acid UV visible spectrum

== See also ==
- Phenolic compounds in wine
