= Arctic Apples =

Apple cultivar

Arctic apple is the trademark for a group of patented apples that contain a nonbrowning trait (when the apples are subjected to mechanical damage, such as slicing or bruising, the apple flesh remains as its original color) introduced through biotechnology. They were developed through a process of genetic engineering by Okanagan Specialty Fruits Inc. Specifically, gene silencing reduces the expression of polyphenol oxidase (PPO), thus delaying the onset of browning. It is the first genetically engineered apple to be approved for commercial sale. The US Food and Drug Administration (FDA) in 2015, and the Canadian Food Inspection Agency, Government of Canada in 2017, determined that Arctic apples are as safe and nutritious as conventional apples.

== Nonbrowning method ==
Developing nonbrowning Arctic apples relies upon a technique called RNA interference (RNAi). This approach enables silencing of PPO expression to less than 10% of its normal expression, but does not change other aspects of the apple. The RNAi process is accomplished through the use of a transgene that uses gene sequences that control PPO production. Promoter and terminator gene sequences are used to support the implementation of PPO suppression genes, as is a marker gene which produces a protein (called NPTII) that makes the plant tissue resistant to the antibiotic kanamycin, allowing transformed plants to metabolize neomycin and kanamycin antibiotics. This step is used to confirm that silencing PPO was successful.

== Regulatory approval and safety ==
Okanagan Specialty Fruits received regulatory approval for two apple varieties in Canada from the Canadian Food Inspection Agency and Health Canada and in the US from the Animal and Plant Health Inspection Service (APHIS), part of the United States Department of Agriculture. Varieties that have received U.S. approval include Arctic Golden (called GD743) and Arctic Granny (GS784) in 2015, and Arctic Fuji (NF872) in 2016. Arctic Golden and Arctic Granny varieties were both approved in Canada in 2015. The Arctic Fuji (NF872) was approved in Canada in 2018. Approval of the apple was opposed by GE Free BC and the Canadian Biotechnology Action Network. Approval of the apples was opposed by some tree fruit associations, such as the BC Fruit Growers' Association and Northwest Horticultural Council (Washington State). Opposition of associations was based on concern about market backlash, not on safety of the product.

The US FDA stated that the safety evaluation of Arctic apples "ensures that food safety issues were resolved prior to commercial distribution", and the Government of Canada stated "that the genetically modified 'Arctic apple' is as safe for humans, livestock and the environment as conventional apples."

== Commercialization ==
As of late 2017, the Arctic Golden variety began retail sales as packaged, preservative-free apple slices. Packaging bears Arctic branding including their "snowflake" logo and a QR code that can be scanned with a smartphone to inform consumers about the safety and non-browning benefits via the company website.

As of 2020, there were 1,350 acres (550 ha) of Arctic apple orchards in Washington state, with 17 million lbs (7.7 million kg) harvested in 2021.

As of 2025, Arctic Apples have become popular in the United States, especially as part of school lunch programs. They are not yet available to Canadian consumers.
