= 4-Butylresorcinol =

Names
- Preferred IUPAC name 4-Butylbenzene-1,3-diol
- Other names Rucinol, 4-n-Butylresorcinol

Identifiers
CAS Number	18979-61-8
3D model (JSmol)	Interactive image
ChEBI	CHEBI:81689
ChEMBL	ChEMBL450195
ChemSpider	178414
ECHA InfoCard	100.126.948
EC Number	606-191-2
KEGG	C18343
PubChem CID	205912
UNII	2IK4UQ3ZGA
CompTox Dashboard (EPA)	DTXSID50172403
- InChI: InChI=1S/C10H14O2/c1-2-3-4-8-5-6-9(11)7-10(8)12/h5-7,11-12H,2-4H2,1H3 Key: CSHZYWUPJWVTMQ-UHFFFAOYSA-N
- SMILES: CCCCC1=C(C=C(C=C1)O)O

Properties
Chemical formula	C_{10}H_{14}O_{2}
Molar mass	166.220 g·mol^{−1}

Hazards
- GHS labelling
Pictograms	(GHS07: Exclamation mark) (GHS09: Environmental hazard)
Signal word	Warning
Hazard statements	H302, H315, H319, H400
Precautionary statements	P264, P270, P273, P280, P301+P312, P302+P352, P305+P351+P338, P321, P330, P332+P313, P337+P313, P362, P391, P501
- Lethal dose or concentration (LD, LC)
LD_{50} (median dose)	500mg/kg (rat)
- Safety data sheet (SDS)
- Except where otherwise noted, data are given for materials in their standard state (at 25 °C [77 °F], 100 kPa). Infobox references

4-Butylresorcinol, sometimes called 4-n-butylresorcinol, is a chemical used to treat hyperpigmentation of the epidermis. Hyperpigmentation is believed to be related to the enzyme tyrosinase which produces melanin. Among several chemicals known to inhibit tyrosinase production, such as hydroquinone, arbutin, and kojic acid, 4-butylresorcinol has been found to be the most powerful inhibitor by IC50, but the mode of inhibition is reversible. 4-Butylresorcinol can be used in the synthesis of tetrahydrocannabutol.

Tyrosinase inhibition assay in μmol/L
compound	in vitro IC50	in vivo
arbutin	> 5000	
hydroquinone	> 1000	< 40
kojic acid	500	
4-n-butylresorcinol	21	13.5
