= Tyrosinase =

Copper metalloprotein

TYR

Identifiers
- Aliases: TYR, ATN, CMM8, OCA1, OCA1A, OCAIA, SHEP3, tyrosinase, Tyrosinase
- External IDs: OMIM: 606933; MGI: 98880; GeneCards: TYR
Enzyme activity
EC #	BRENDA	ExPASy	KEGG	MetaCyc
1.14.18.1	↗	↗	↗	↗

Gene location (Human)
Chr.	Chromosome 11 (human)
Band	11q14.3	Start	89,177,875 bp
Band	11q14.3	End	89,295,759 bp

Gene location (Mouse)
Chr.	Chromosome 7 (mouse)
Band	7 D3|7 49.01 cM	Start	87,073,979 bp
Band	7 D3|7 49.01 cM	End	87,142,720 bp
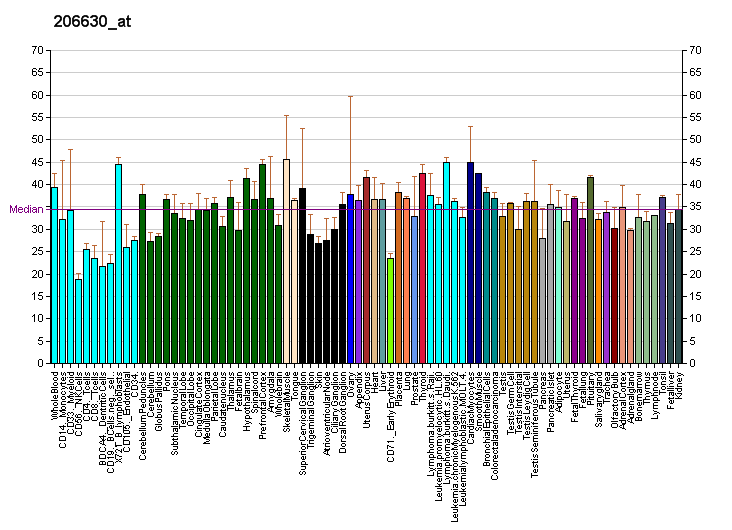
RNA expression pattern
Bgee	Human / Mouse (ortholog); Top expressed in: retinal pigment epithelium; testicle; skin of thigh; skin of abdomen; Achilles tendon; human penis; vulva; Descending thoracic aorta; ascending aorta; ganglionic eminence / Top expressed in: iris; hair follicle; stria vascularis; ciliary body; retinal pigment epithelium; lumbar subsegment of spinal cord; gastrula; cornea; epithelium of lens; utricle; More reference expression data
BioGPS	More reference expression data
Gene ontology
Molecular function	metal ion binding; copper ion binding; monooxygenase activity; protein homodimerization activity; oxidoreductase activity; protein heterodimerization activity; protein binding; Polyphenol oxidase; tyrosinase activity
Cellular component	cytoplasm; integral component of membrane; cytosol; nucleus; membrane; perinuclear region of cytoplasm; lysosome; melanosome membrane; Golgi-associated vesicle; melanosome; intracellular membrane-bounded organelle
Biological process	response to UV; response to cAMP; metabolism; melanin biosynthetic process from tyrosine; response to vitamin D; pigmentation; thymus development; eye pigment biosynthetic process; cell population proliferation; visual perception; melanin biosynthetic process
Sources:Amigo / QuickGO
Orthologs
Databases	NCBI: entry; OMA: entry
Species	Human	Mouse
Entrez	7299	22173
Ensembl	ENSG00000077498	ENSMUSG00000004651
UniProt	P14679	P11344
RefSeq (mRNA)	NM_000372	NM_011661; NM_001317397
RefSeq (protein)	NP_000363	NP_001304326; NP_035791
Location (UCSC)	Chr 11: 89.18 – 89.3 Mb	Chr 7: 87.07 – 87.14 Mb
PubMed search
- Wikidata
View/Edit Human	View/Edit Mouse

Tyrosinase is an enzyme that in humans is encoded by the gene TYR. It is an oxidase that is the rate-limiting enzyme for controlling the production of melanin. The enzyme is mainly involved in two distinct reactions of melanin synthesis otherwise known as the Raper–Mason pathway. Firstly, the hydroxylation of a monophenol and secondly, the conversion of an o-diphenol to the corresponding o-quinone. o-Quinone undergoes several reactions to eventually form melanin.

Tyrosinase is a copper-containing enzyme present in plant and animal tissues that catalyzes the production of melanin and other pigments from tyrosine by oxidation. It is found inside melanosomes which are synthesized in the skin melanocytes. In humans, the tyrosinase enzyme is encoded by the TYR gene.

== Catalyzed reaction ==
Tyrosinase carries out the oxidation of phenols such as tyrosine and dopamine using molecular oxygen (O_{2}). In the presence of catechol, benzoquinone is formed (see reaction below). Hydrogens removed from catechol combine with oxygen to form water.

The substrate specificity becomes dramatically restricted in mammalian tyrosinase which uses only L-form of tyrosine or DOPA as substrates, and has restricted requirement for L-DOPA as cofactor.

=== Active site ===
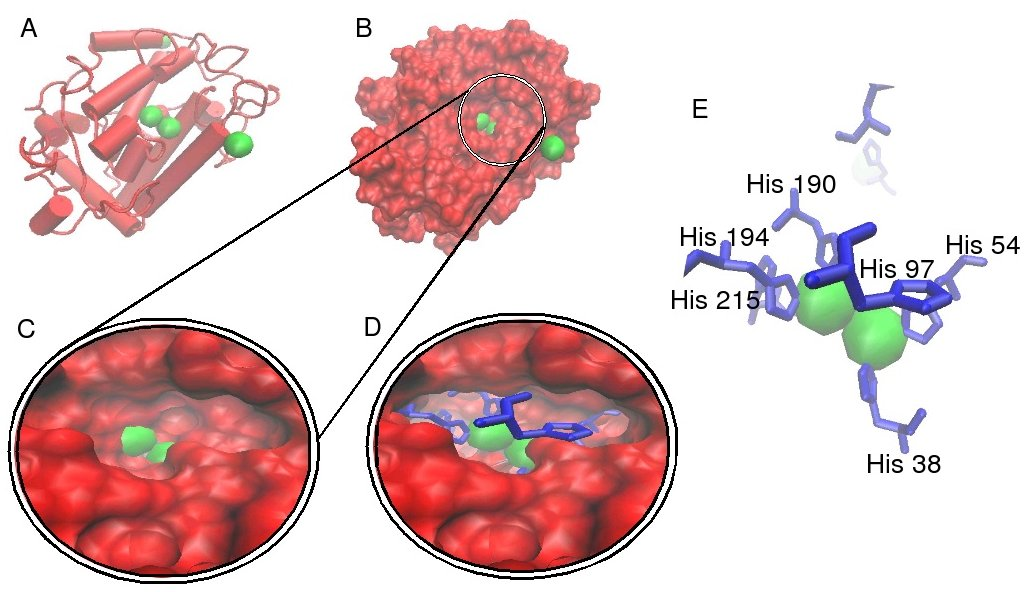
Crystallographic structure of a Streptomyces-derived tyrosinase in complex with a so-called "caddie protein". In all models, only the tyrosinase molecule is shown, copper atoms are shown in green and the molecular surface is shown in red. In models D and E, histidine amino acids are shown as a blue line representation. From model E, each copper atom within the active site is indeed complexed with three histidine residues, forming a type 3 copper center. From models C and D, the active site for this protein can be seen to sit within a pillus formed on the molecular surface of the molecule.

monophenol monooxygenase
- Catechol-Quinone

Identifiers
- EC no.: 1.14.18.1
- CAS no.: 9002-10-2

Databases
- BRENDA: enzyme data
- ExPASy: NiceZyme view
- KEGG: enzyme entry
- MetaCyc: metabolic pathway
- Rhea: reactions
- PDB structures: RCSB PDB PDBe PDBsum
- Gene Ontology: AmiGO / QuickGO
Search
- PMC: articles
- PubMed: articles
- NCBI: proteins

Tyrosinase
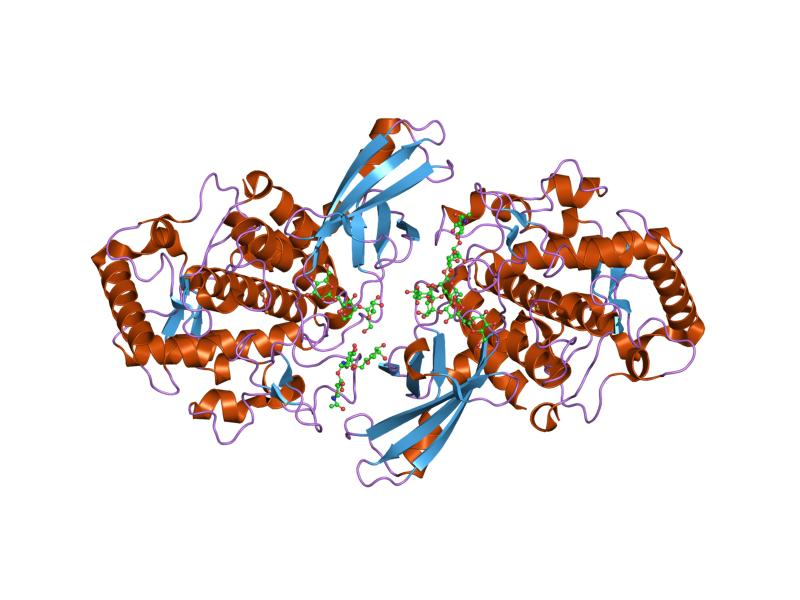
- Tridimensional structure of a functional unit from octopus hemocyanin

Identifiers
- Symbol: Tyrosinase
- Pfam: PF00264
- Pfam clan: CL0205
- InterPro: IPR002227
- PROSITE: PDOC00398
- SCOP2: 1hc2 / SCOPe / SUPFAM
Available protein structures:
- PDB: IPR002227 PF00264 (ECOD; PDBsum)
- AlphaFold: IPR002227; PF00264

Common central domain of tyrosinase

Identifiers
- Symbol: Tyrosinase
- Pfam: PF00264
- InterPro: IPR002227
- PROSITE: PDOC00398
- SCOP2: 1hc2 / SCOPe / SUPFAM
Available protein structures:
- PDB: IPR002227 PF00264 (ECOD; PDBsum)
- AlphaFold: IPR002227; PF00264

The two copper atoms within the active site of tyrosinase enzymes interact with molecular oxygen to form a highly reactive chemical intermediate that then oxidizes the substrate. The activity of tyrosinase is similar to catechol oxidase, a related class of copper oxidase. Tyrosinases and catechol oxidases are collectively termed polyphenol oxidases.

== Structure ==
Tyrosinases have been isolated and studied from a wide variety of plant, animal, and fungal species. Tyrosinases from different species are diverse in terms of their structural properties, tissue distribution, and cellular location. No common tyrosinase protein structure occurring across all species has been found. The enzymes found in plant, animal, and fungal tissue frequently differ with respect to their primary structure, size, glycosylation pattern, and activation characteristics. However, all tyrosinases have in common a binuclear, type 3 copper centre within their active sites. Here, two copper atoms are each coordinated with three histidine residues.

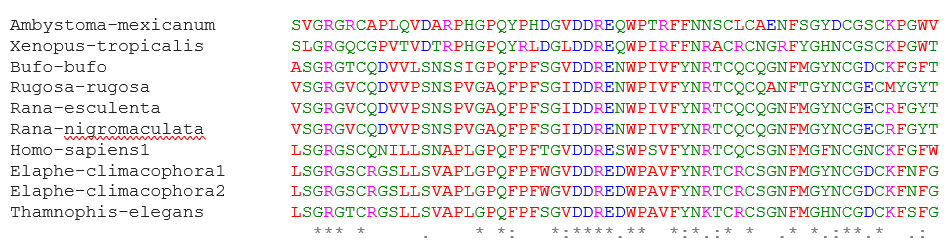
This is an alignment structure showing only the conserved region of protein nucleotide sequences of Frogs (Their NCBI GenBank accession number CAR95491, CAJ82935, BAA02077, BAV78831 and AAC17168), Snakes (Their NCBI GenBank accession numbers BBC55580, XP032076040 and BBC55647) and Human (GenBank accession number AAA61242) using Clustal Omega. (Note: (*) shows a conserved region,(.) shows more conserved and (:) shows less conserved.)

=== Plant ===
In vivo, plant PPOs are expressed as about 64–68 kDa proteins consisting of three domains: a chloroplastic transit peptide (containing a ~4-9 kDa thylakoid signal peptide), a catalytically active domain (~ 37–42 kDa) containing the dinuclear copper center, and a C-terminal domain (~15–19 kDa) shielding the active site.

=== Mammalian ===
Mammalian tyrosinase is a single membrane-spanning transmembrane protein. In humans, tyrosinase is sorted into melanosomes and the catalytically active domain of the protein resides within melanosomes. Only a small, enzymatically inessential part of the protein extends into the cytoplasm of the melanocyte.

As opposed to fungal tyrosinase, human tyrosinase is a membrane-bound glycoprotein and has 13% carbohydrate content.

The derived TYR allele (rs2733832) is associated with lighter skin pigmentation in human populations. It is most common in Europe, but is also found at lower, moderate frequencies in Central Asia, the Middle East, North Africa, and among the San and Mbuti Pygmies.

=== Bacterial ===
In peatlands, bacterial tyrosinases are proposed to act as key regulators of carbon storage by removing phenolic compounds, which inhibit the degradation of organic carbon.

=== Fungal ===
In the fungus Neurospora crassa, four different forms of tyrosinase were distinguished among different strains. In each strain only one structure-determining genetic region was found for the enzyme.

== Gene regulation ==
The gene for tyrosinase is regulated by the microphthalmia-associated transcription factor (MITF).

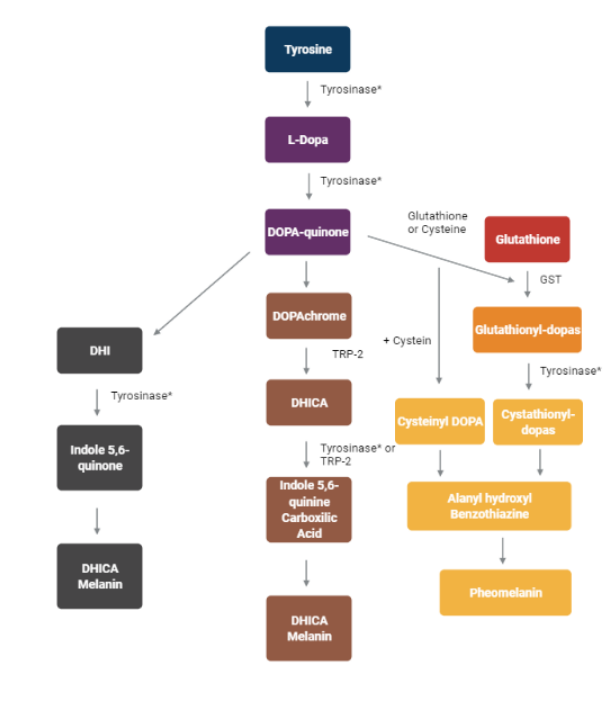
The Raper–Mason (melanogenesis) pathway, depicting the steps in melanin synthesis. DHI- 5,6 dihydroxyindole, DHICA - 5,6- dihydroxyphenylalanine, GGT- Gamma-glutamyl transpeptidase, GST- Glutathione-S-transferase; L-Dopa - Levo- Dopa, TRP-2- Tyrosinase- related protein 2

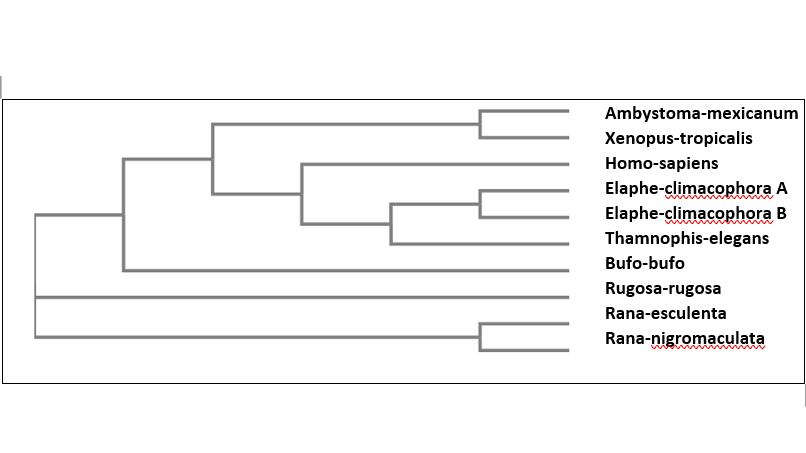
A representative phylogenetic tree cladogram of tyrosinase proteins. Tyrosinase sequences from ten vertebrates species( Genus: Ambystoma, Xenopus, Homo, Elaphe, Thamnophis, Bufo, Rugosa, and Rana) were analyzed. The multiple alignments are generated by the CLUSTAL W program( version 1.7)and the phylogenetic trees were constructed by the Neighbour-joining method without distance correction. So Ambystoma and Xenopus do not cluster with other amphibians. Branches and nodes are drawn according to identical patterns.

== Clinical significance ==
A mutation in the tyrosinase gene resulting in impaired tyrosinase production leads to type I oculocutaneous albinism, a hereditary disorder that affects one in every 20,000 people.

Tyrosinase activity is very important. If uncontrolled during the synthesis of melanin, it results in increased melanin synthesis. Decreasing tyrosinase activity has been targeted for the improvement or prevention of conditions related to the hyperpigmentation of the skin, such as melasma and age spots.

Several polyphenols, including flavonoids or stilbenoid, substrate analogues, free radical scavengers, and copper chelators, have been known to inhibit tyrosinase. Henceforth, the medical and cosmetic industries are focusing research on tyrosinase inhibitors to treat skin disorders.

== Inhibitors ==
Known Tyrosinase inhibitors are the following:

- Azelaic acid
- 4-Butylresorcinol
- Hydroquinone
- L-ascorbic acid - Vitamin C
- Tranexamic acid

== Genetics ==
While albinism is common, there have only been a few studies about the genetic mutations in the tyrosinase genes of animals. One of them was on Bubalus bubalis (water buffalo). The tyrosinase mRNA sequence of the wild-type B. bubalis is 1,958 base pairs (bp) with an open reading frame (ORF) of 1,593 bp long, which translates to 530 amino acids. Meanwhile, the tyrosinase gene of the albino B. bubalis (GenBank JN_887463) is truncated at position 477, caused by a point mutation in nucleotide 1431 which converts a Tryptophan (TGG) into a stop codon (TGA), resulting in a shorter and inactive tyrosinase gene. Other albinos have point mutations that appear to inactivate Tyrosinase without truncation (see table and figure for examples).

Species	Common name	Amino Acid mutation	GenBank	Uniprot ID
Bubalus bubalis	Water Buffalo	W477 -> Stop codon	JN_887462	J7FBF2
Pelophylax nigromaculatus	Pond Frog	Deletion of a K228		Q04604
Glandirana rugosa	Wrinkled Frog	G376 -> D376		A0A1I9FZH0
Fejervarya kawamurai	Rice Frog	G57 -> R57		A0A1E1G7U0

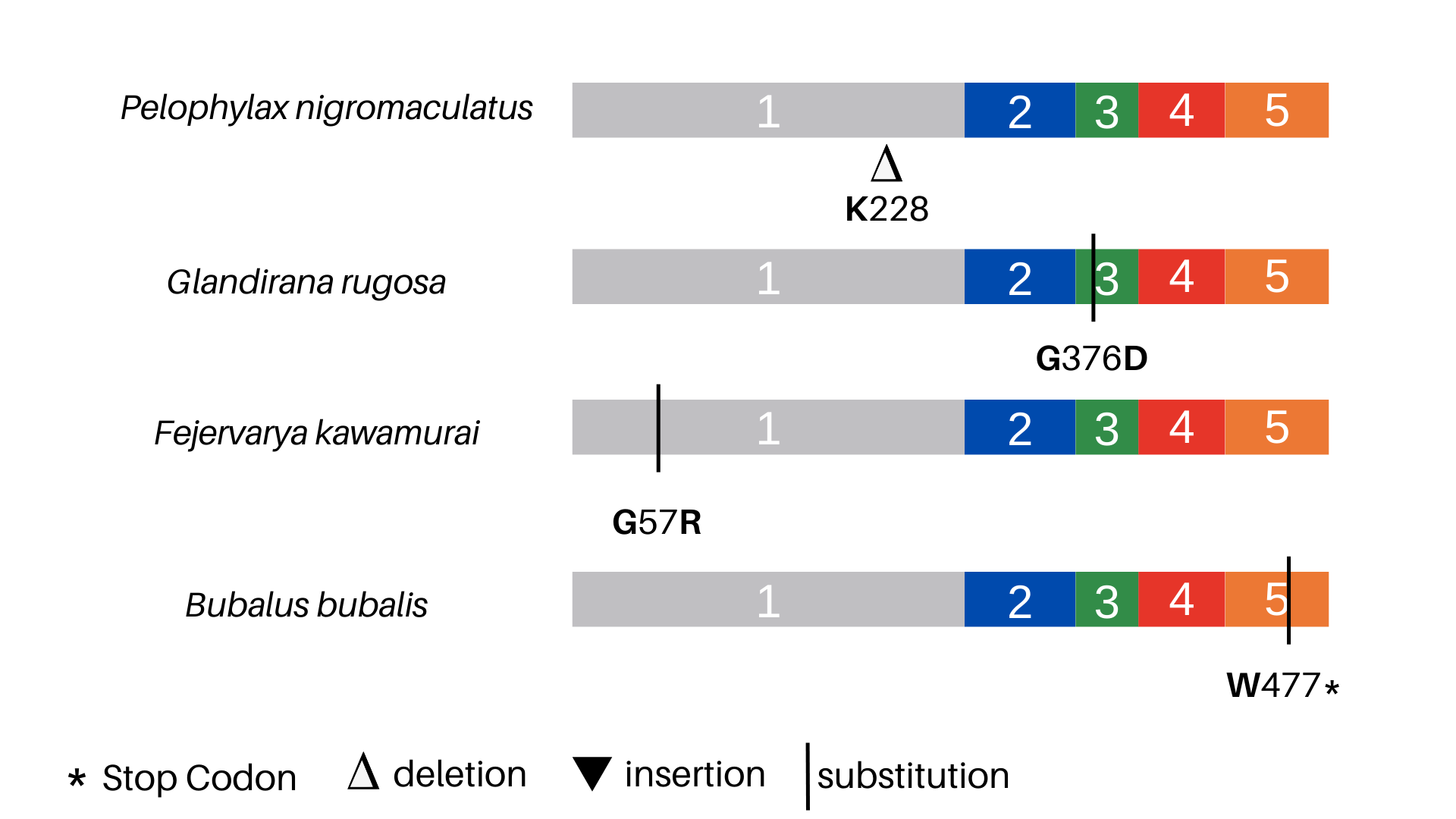
Mutations in the tyrosinase gene that have been shown to cause albinism in animals. Colored boxes indicate regions in the protein encoded by one of five exons (see figure of gene structure). Positions refer to amino acid positions in protein of each species. Modified after Miura et al.

Knowing that there are a few studies about the genomic data of the tyrosinase gene, there are only a handful of studies on the mutations in albino amphibians. Miura et al. (2018) investigates the amino acid mutations in the tyrosinase gene in three albino frogs: Pelophylax nigromaculatus (pond frog), Glandirana rugosa (wrinkled frog) and Fejervarya kawamurai (rice frog). In total, five different populations were studied of which three were P. nigromaculatus and one each of G. rugosa and F. kawamurai. In two of the three P. nigromaculatus populations, there was a frameshift mutation because of the insertion of a thymine within exons 1 and 3, and the third population lacked three nucleotides that encoded a Lysine in exon 1. The population of G. rugosa had a missense mutation where there was an amino acid substitution from a Glycine to Aspartic acid, and the mutation of F. kawamurai was also an amino acid substitution from Glycine to Arginine. The mutation for G. rugosa and F. kawamurai occurs in exons 1 and 3. The mutations of the third population of P. nigromaculatus, and the mutations of G. rugosa and F. kawamurai occurred in areas that are highly conserved among vertebrates which could result in a dysfunctional tyrosinase gene.

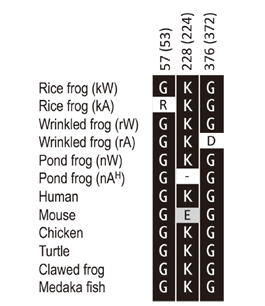
Substituted amino acids of tyrosinase in albino frogs and corresponding amino acids in other vertebrate species (Miura et al., 2018). kW refers to the rice frog kawamurai Wild type, kA: kawamurai Albino type, rW: rugosa Wild, rA: rugosa Albino, nW nigromaculatus Wild, nA^{H}: nigromaculatus Albino collected from Hiroshima. Numbers outside of the parenthesis refer to the amino acid position of the mutated species, and the number in the parenthesis refers to the associated amino acid position in the human sequence. (Miura et al. 2018)

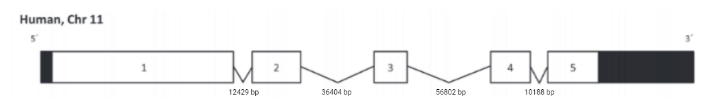
This is a schematic representation of the intron-exon organization of tyrosinase (TYP) gene in humans (ClinVar: NM_ 000372). Open and closed boxes represent protein-coding and untranslated regions of exons, respectively, with exons labeled by numbers. Intron sizes are indicated by small numbers (in bp).

== Evolution ==
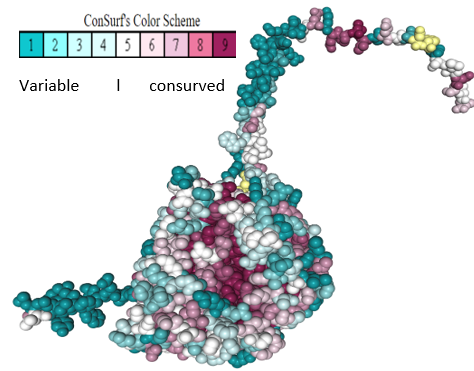
ConSurf uses a series of nine colors from turquoise through white through burgundy to represent conservation grades from variable through conserved, respectively. At right is an alternative color scheme inspired by the earlier (now obsolete) ProteinExplorer's MSA3D (in which grades 4, 5, and 6 use the same color).

Tyrosinase is a highly conserved protein in animals and apparently arose already in bacteria. The tyrosinase related protein (Tyrp1) and dopachrome tautomerase (Dtc), which encode for protein implicated in melanin synthesis which are the common regulatory elements of exon/intron structure. The development of the three types of vertebrate pigment cells, although different, thus converge at a certain point to allow the expression of members of the tyrosinase family, in order to produce melanin pigments. Tyrosinase family related genes plays an important role in the evolution, genetics, and developmental biology of pigment cells, as well as to approach human disorders associated with defects in their synthesis, regulation or function in vertebrates three types of melanin producing pigment cells are well known since embryonic origin i.e., from the neural crest, neural tube and pineal body. All of them have the capacity to produce melanin pigments. Their biosynthesis is governed by evolutionary conserved enzymes of the tyrosinase family( tyr, tyr1 and tyr2) also called DOPAchrome tautomerase (dct). Among them Tyr plays significance role in melanin production. However, sequenced genome from the different taxa for evolutionary analysis in the depth become more crucial in present study. Similarly, the type-3 copper protein family perform various biological function including pigment formation, innate immunity and oxygen transport. The combine genetic phylogenetic and structural analysis concluded that the original type-3 copper protein possessed a single peptide and grouped into α subclass. The ancestral protein gene underwent to two duplication i.e., first one prior to divergence of unknown eukaryotic lineage and second one before diversification. The prior duplication gave rise to cytosolic form(β) and latter duplication gave membrane bound form (Γ). The structural comparison concluded that active site of α and γ forms are covered by aliphatic amino acids and β form covered with aromatic residue. Thus, the evolution of these gene family is the lineage of multicellular eukaryotes due to loss of one or more of these three subclasses and lineage-specific expansion of one or both of the remaining subclasses. The genomic conserved nucleotide alignments of the tyrosinase among the vertebrate family like frogs, snakes and human suggests that it has evolved from one ancestral tyrosinase gene. The duplication and mutation of this gene is probably responsible for the emergence of a tyrosinase-related gene.

== Applications ==
=== In the food industry ===
In the food industry, tyrosinase inhibition is desired as tyrosinase catalyzes the oxidation of phenolic compounds found in fruits and vegetables into quinones, which gives an undesirable taste and color and also decreases the availability of certain essential amino acids as well as the digestibility of the products. As such, highly effective tyrosinase inhibitors are also needed in agriculture and the food industry. Well known tyrosinase inhibitors include kojic acid, tropolone, coumarins, vanillic acid, vanillin, and vanillic alcohol.

=== In the cosmetic industry ===
Lighter skin complexion has been associated with youth and beauty across various Asian cultures. Recent research by cosmetic companies has been focused on the development of novel whitening agents that selectively suppress tyrosinase activity to reduce hyperpigmentation while avoiding cytotoxicity of healthy melanocytes. Traditional pharmacological agents such as corticosteroids, hydroquinone, and amino numeric chloride lighten skin through the inhibition of melanocyte maturation. However, these agents are associated with adverse effects. Cosmetic companies have been focused on developing novel whitening agents that selectively suppress the activity of tyrosinase to reduce hyperpigmentation while avoiding melanocyte cytotoxicity as tyrosinase is the rate-limiting step of the melanogenesis pathway.

=== In insects ===
Tyrosinase has a wide range of functions in insects, including wound healing, sclerotization, melanin synthesis and parasite encapsulation. As a result, it is an important enzyme as it is the defensive mechanism of insects. Some insecticides are aimed to inhibit tyrosinase.

=== In mussel-glue inspired polymers ===
Tyrosinase activated polymerization of peptides, containing cysteine and tyrosine residues, lead to mussel-glue inspired polymers. The tyrosine residues are enzymatically oxidized to dopaquinones, to which thiols of cysteine could link by an intermolecular Michael-addition. The resulting polymers adsorb strongly to various surfaces with high adhesion energies.
