= Vineyard =

Plantation of grape-bearing vines

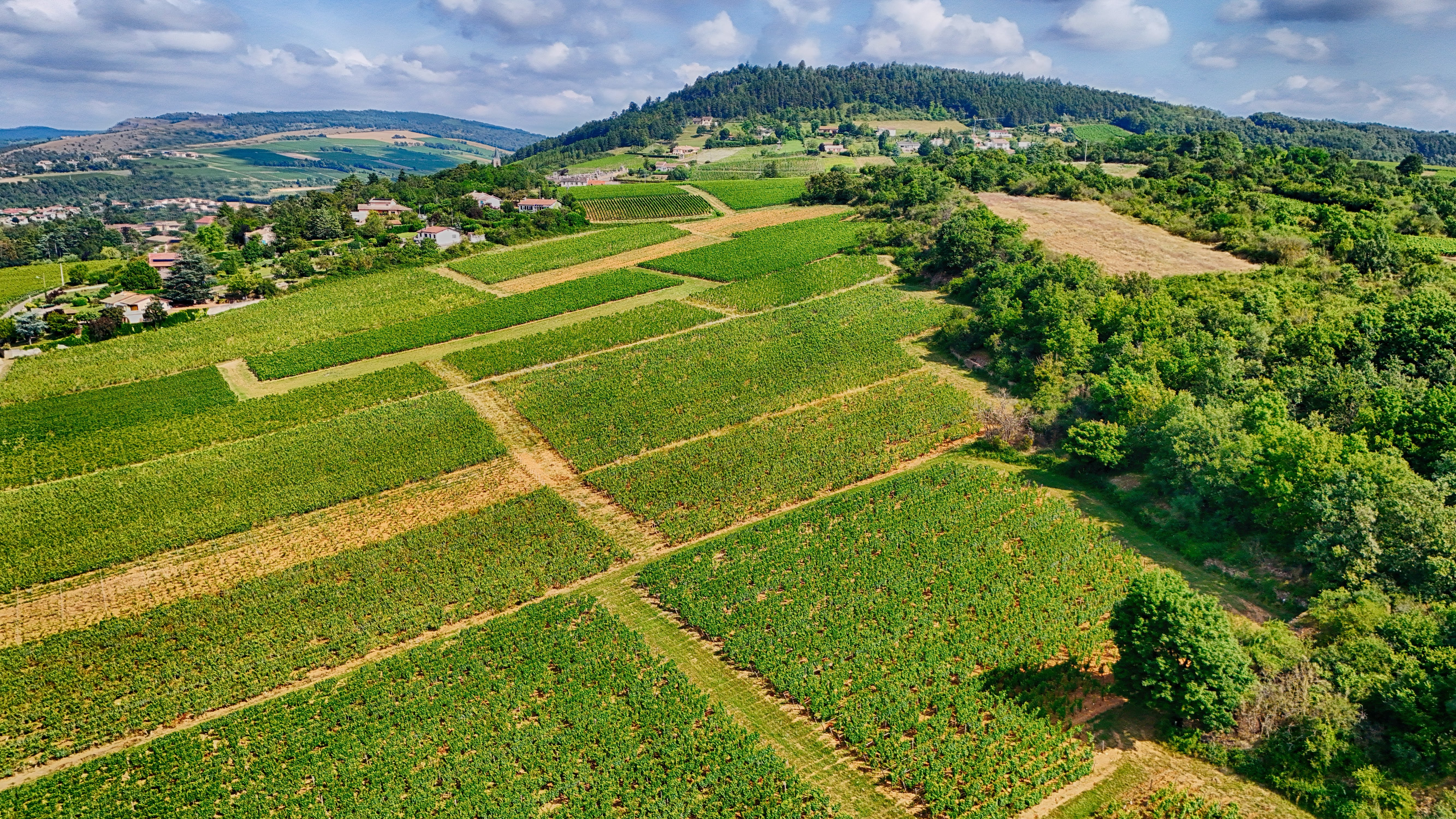
Aerial view of a vineyard in Burgundy in France

Aerial view of vineyards in autumn in the Alsace wine region of France

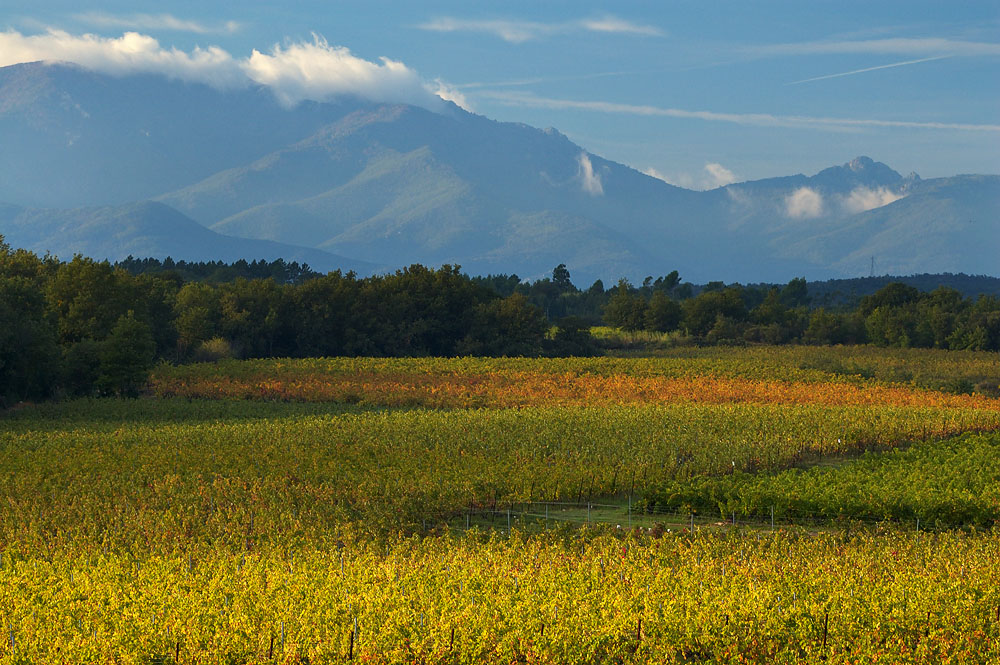
The extensive vineyards of the Languedoc-Roussillon region, southern France

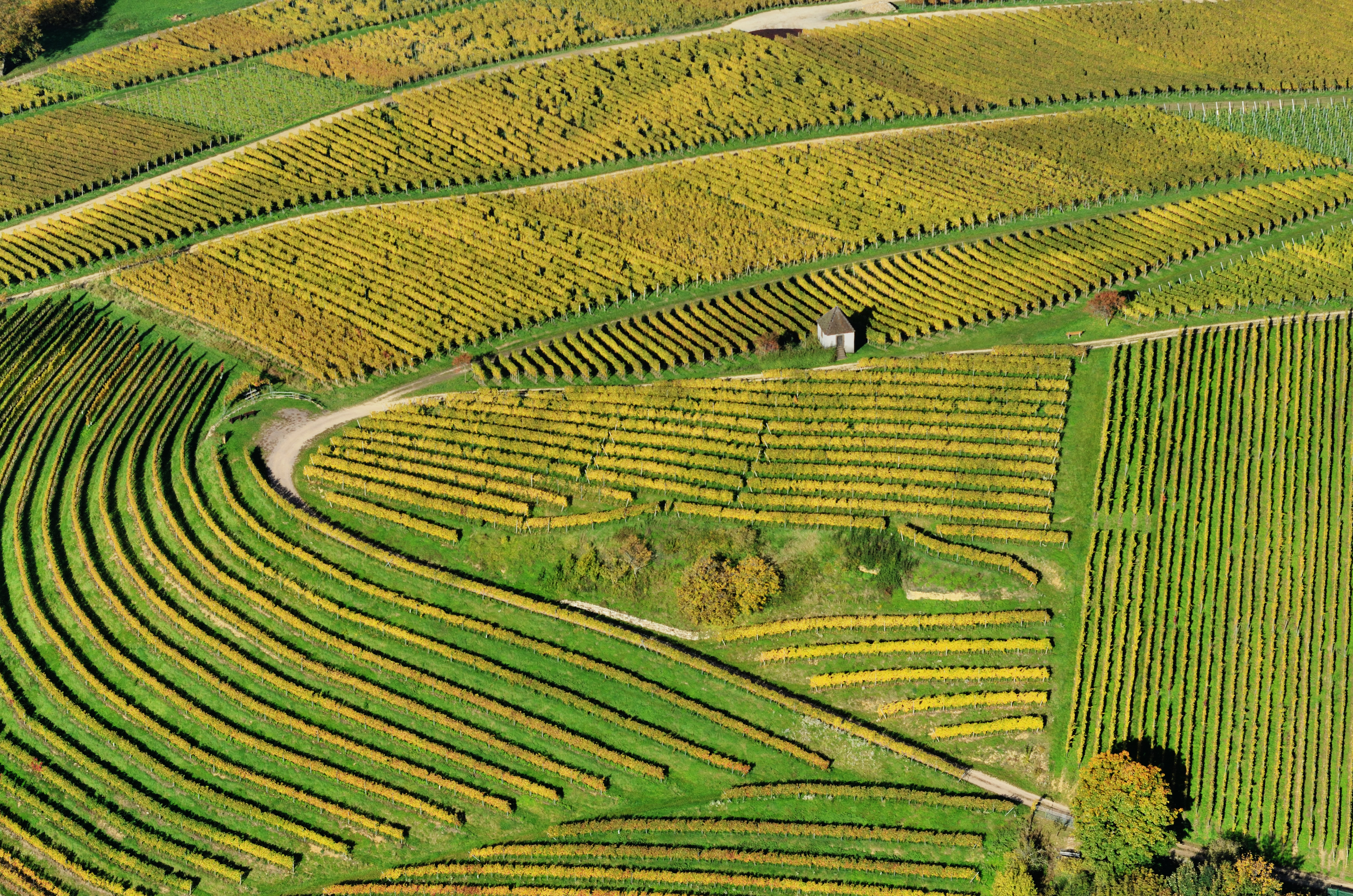
Aerial view of vineyards in Markgräflerland, Baden, Germany

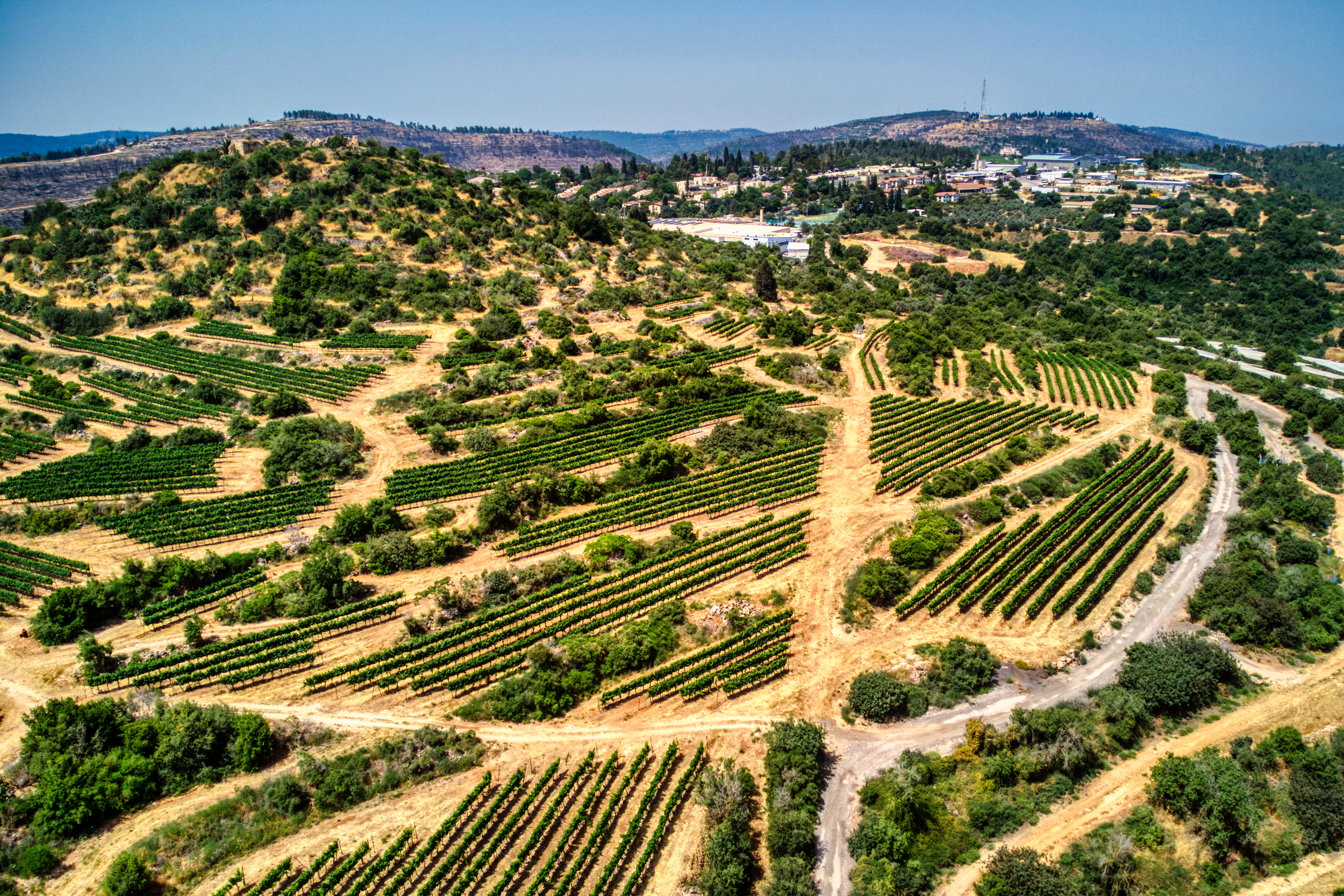
Vineyards in the Judaean Mountains near Jerusalem

A vineyard (/ˈvɪn.jərd/ VIN-yərd, UK also /ˈvɪn.jɑːrd/ VIN-yard) is a plantation of grape-bearing vines. Many vineyards exist for winemaking; others for the production of raisins, table grapes, and non-alcoholic grape juice. The science, practice and study of vineyard production is known as viticulture. Vineyards are often characterised by their terroir, a French term loosely translating as "a sense of place" that refers to the specific geographical and geological characteristics of grapevine plantations, which may be imparted to the wine itself.

== History ==
The earliest evidence of wine production dates from between 6000 and 5000 BC. Wine making technology improved considerably with the ancient Greeks, but it was not until the end of the Roman Empire that cultivation techniques as we know them were common throughout Europe.

In medieval Europe the Catholic Church was a staunch supporter of wine, which was necessary for the celebration of the Mass. During the lengthy instability of the Middle Ages, the monasteries maintained and developed viticultural practices, having the resources, security, stability and interest in improving the quality of their vines. They owned and tended the best vineyards in Europe, and vinum theologium was considered superior to all others.

European vineyards were planted with a wide variety of the Vitis vinifera grape. In the late 19th century, the entire species was nearly destroyed in an event known as the Great French Wine Blight, in which the grape pest phylloxera, an insect related to aphids, was accidentally introduced to Europe from North America. Native American grapevines include varieties of Vitis labrusca, which is resistant to the insect. Vitis vinifera varieties were saved by being grafted onto rootstocks of Native American varieties, although there is still no remedy for phylloxera, which remains a danger to any vineyard not planted with grafted rootstock.

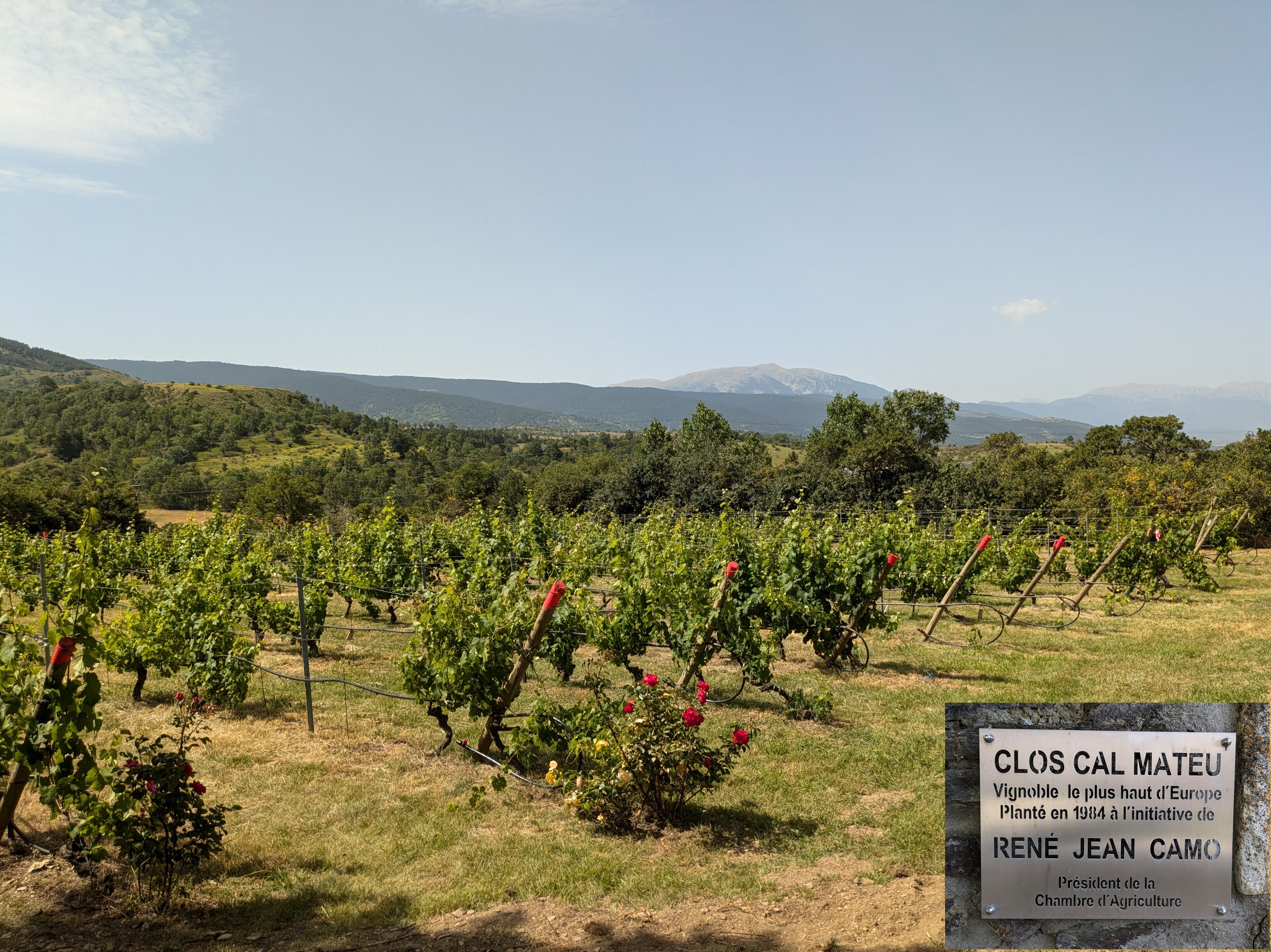
Vineyard at an altitude of 1300 metres in Cerdanya, France.

== Modern practices ==
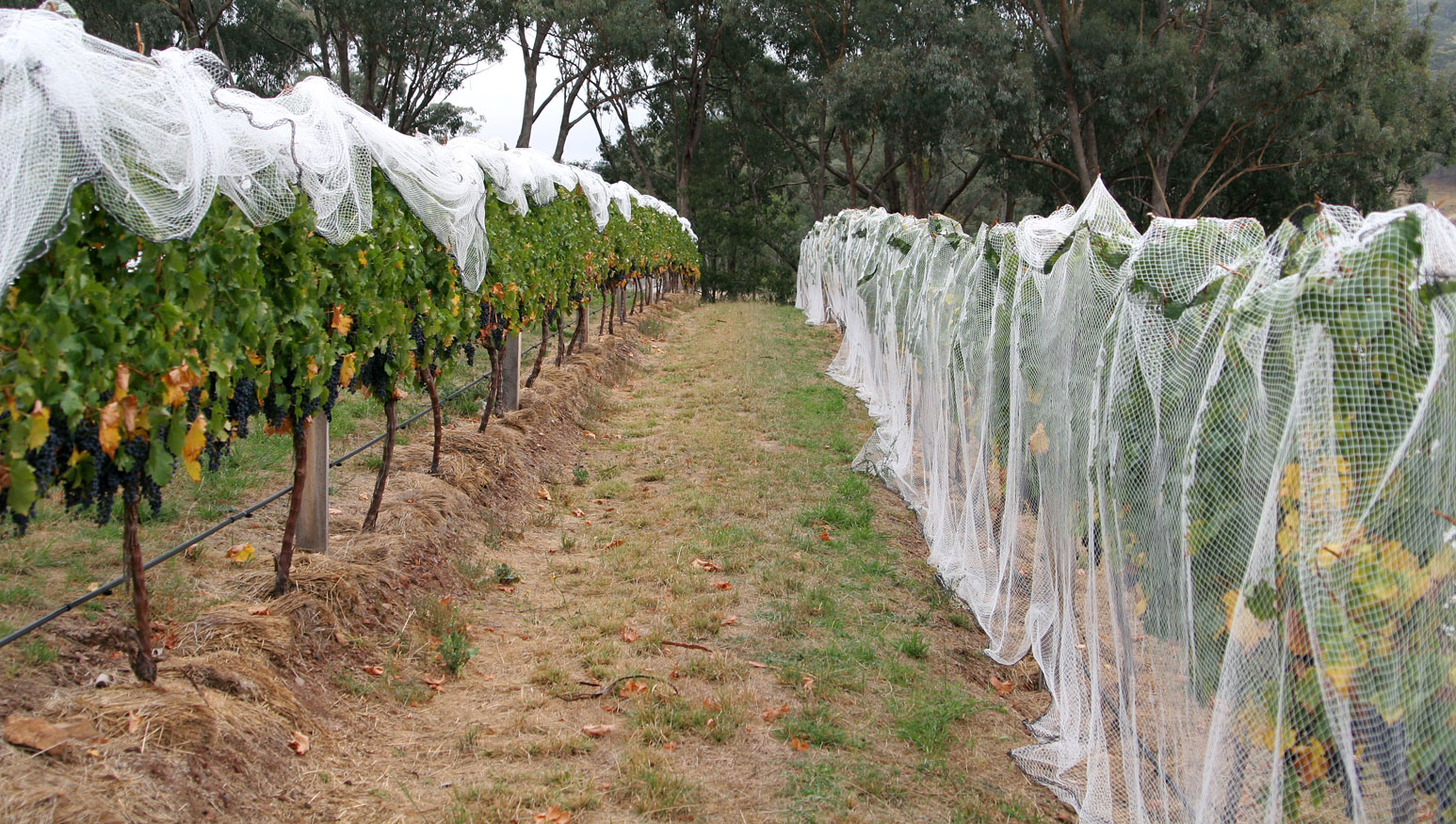
A vineyard with bird-netting

The quest for vineyard efficiency has produced a bewildering range of systems and techniques in recent years. Due to the often much more fertile New World growing conditions, attention has focussed heavily on managing the vine's more vigorous growth. Innovation in palissage (training of the vine, usually along a trellis, and often referred to as "canopy management") and pruning and thinning methods (which aim to optimize the Leaf Area/Fruit (LA/F) ratio relative to a vineyard's microclimate) have largely replaced more general, traditional concepts like "yield per unit area" in favor of "maximizing yield of desired quality". Many of these new techniques have since been adopted in place of traditional practice in the more progressive of the so-called "Old World" vineyards.

Other recent practices include spraying water on vines to protect them from sub-zero temperatures, new grafting techniques, soil slotting, and mechanical harvesting. Such technique have made possible the development of wine industries in New World countries such as Canada. Today there is increasing interest in developing organic, ecologically sensitive and sustainable vineyards. Biodynamic wine has become increasingly popular in viticulture. The use of drip irrigation in recent years has expanded vineyards into areas which were previously unplantable.

For well over half a century, New York's Cornell University, the University of California, Davis, and California State University, Fresno, among others, have been conducting scientific experiments to improve viticulture and educate practitioners. The research includes developing improved grape varieties and investigating pest control. The International Grape Genome Program is a multi-national effort to discover a genetic means to improving quality, increasing yield and providing a "natural" resistance to pests.

The implementation of mechanical harvesting is often stimulated by changes in labor laws, labor shortages, and bureaucratic complications. It can be expensive to hire labor for short periods of time, which does not square well with the need to reduce production costs and harvest quickly, often at night. However, very small vineyards, incompatible widths between rows of grape vines and steep terrain hinder the employment of machine harvesting even more than the resistance of traditional views which reject such harvesting.

== Current trends ==
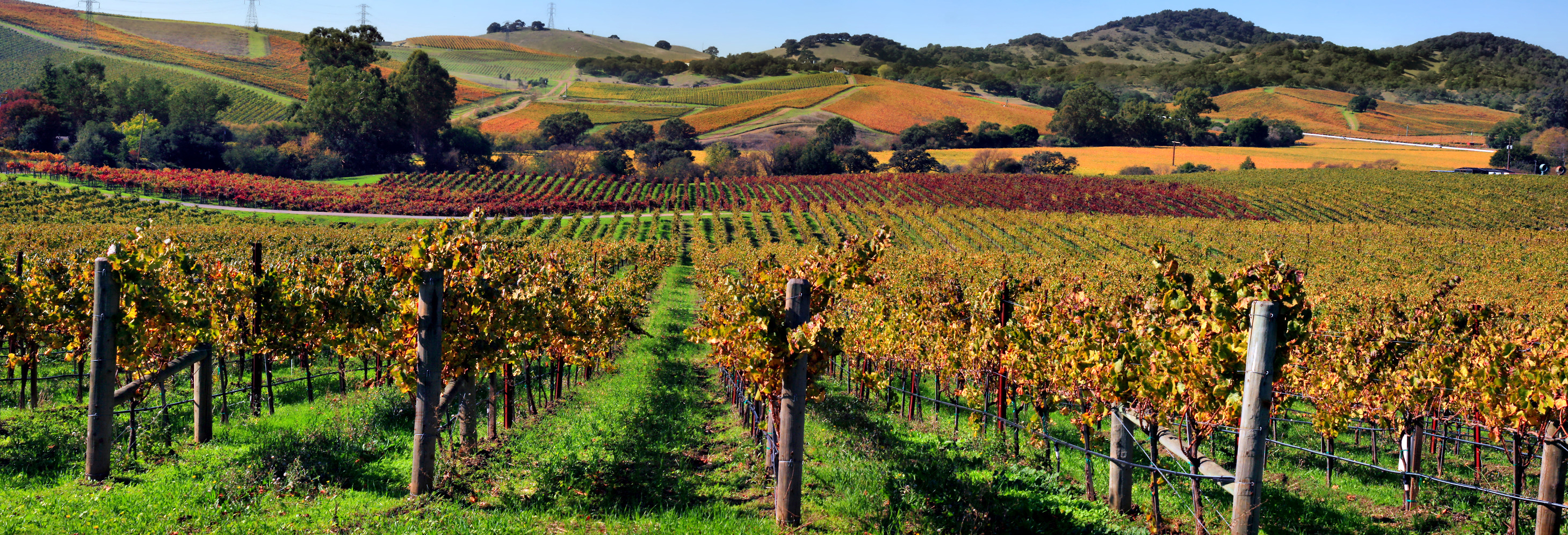
A vineyard in Napa Valley, California

Vineyard and deck on the North Fork of Long Island

Numbers of New World vineyard plantings have been increasing almost as fast as European vineyards are being uprooted. Between 1990 and 2003, the number of U.S. vineyards increased from 1,180 to 3,860 km^{2} or 292,000 to 954,000 acres, while Australian vineyard numbers more than doubled from 590 to 1,440 km^{2} (146,000 to 356,000 acres) and Chilean vineyards grew from 654 to 1,679 km^{2} (161,500 to 415,000 acres). The size of individual vineyards in the New World is significant. Europe's 1.6 million vineyards are an average of 0.2 km^{2} (49 acres) each, while the average Australian vineyard is 0.5 km^{2} (120 acres), providing considerable economies of scale. Exports to Europe from New World growers increased by 54% in the six years up to 2006.

There have also been significant changes in the kinds of grapes that are grown. For example, in Chile, large areas of low-quality grapes have been replaced with such grapes as Chardonnay and Cabernet Sauvignon.

In Argentina, due to an economic down-turn, acreage of Malbec was significantly reduced in the 1980s, but in the 1990s, during the quality revolution incited by Malbec Pioneer Nicolás Catena Zapata, growers started planting more Malbec, most notably in higher altitudes where cooler temperatures and more intense sunlight yield more concentrated yet smoother and more complex malbecs. Grape changes are often in response to changing consumer demand but sometimes result from vine pull schemes designed to promote vineyard change. Alternatively, the development of "T" budding now permits the grafting of a different grape variety onto existing rootstock in the vineyard, making it possible to switch varieties within a two-year period.

Local legislation often dictates which varieties are selected, how they are grown, whether vineyards can be irrigated and exactly when grapes can be harvested, all of which in serves to reinforce tradition. Changes in the law can also change which grapes are planted. For example, during Prohibition in the U.S. (1920–1933), vineyards in California expanded sevenfold to meet the increasing demand for home brewing. However, they were largely planted in varieties with tough skins that could be transported across the country to home wine-makers and the resulting wine was of a low quality.

According to the International Organisation of Vine and Wine, in April 2015, China (799,000 hectares or 1,970,000 acres) overtook France (792,000 hectares or 1,960,000 acres) in terms of land devoted to vineyards, in second place behind Spain (1,000,200 hectares or 2,472,000 acres), the world's largest producer.

== Terroir ==
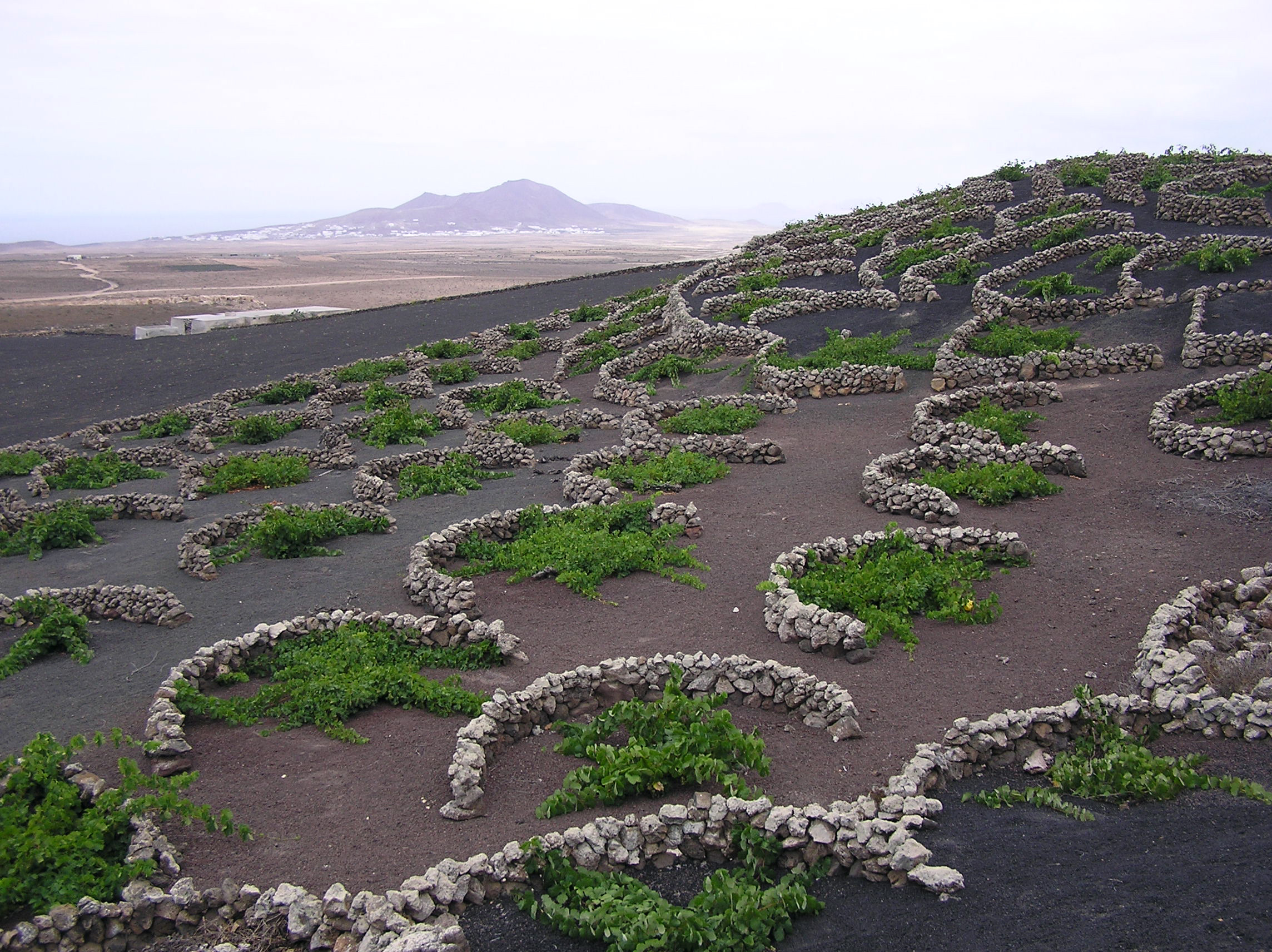
Malvasia grape vines growing in topsoil covered in lapilli, at La Geria, Lanzarote, Canary Islands. The low, curved walls protect the vines from the constant, drying wind.

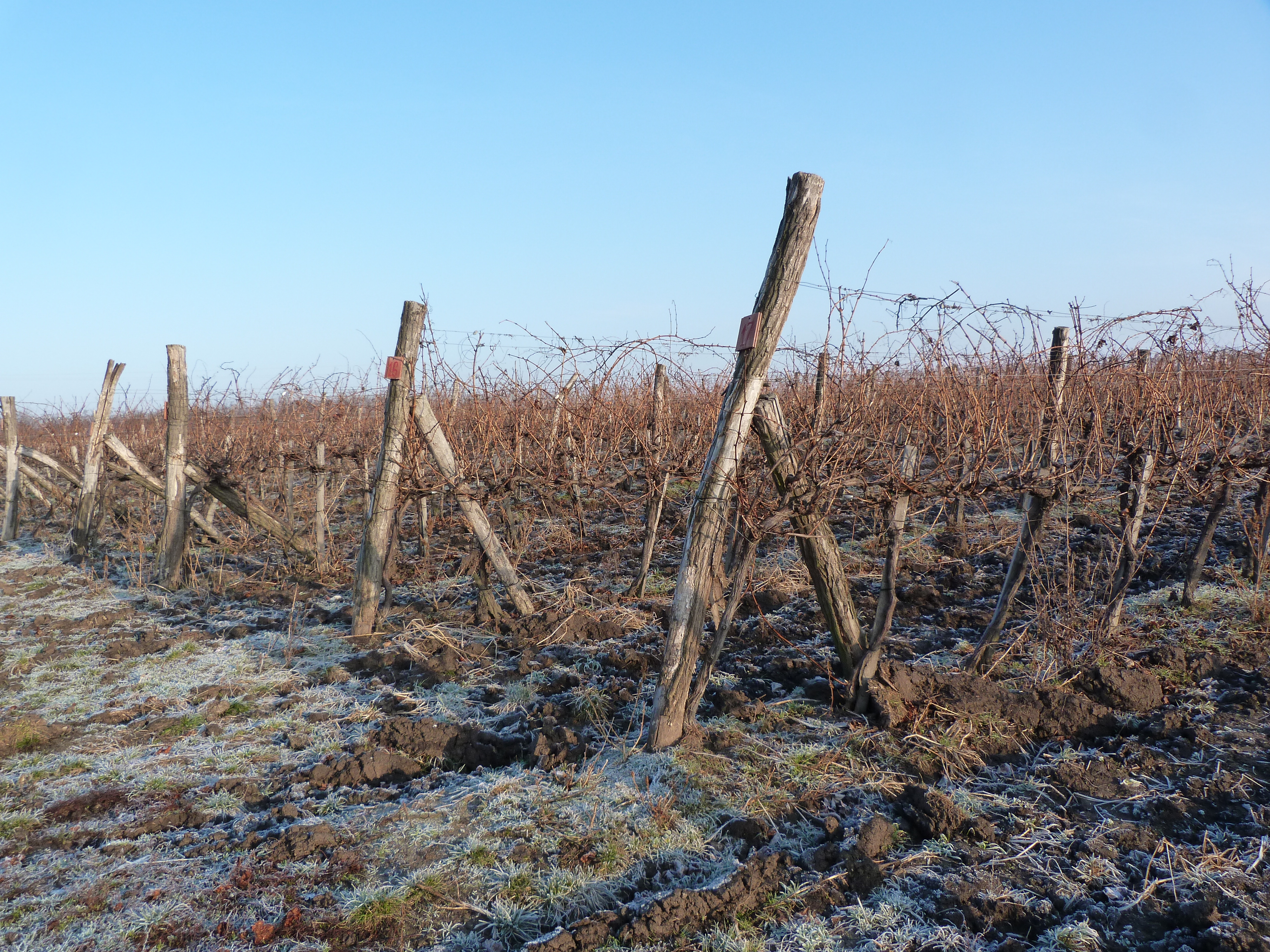
Wine estate in Hungary

Terroir refers to the combination of natural factors associated with any particular vineyard. These factors include things such as soil, underlying rock, altitude, slope of hill or terrain, orientation toward the sun, and microclimate (typical rain, winds, humidity, temperature variations, etc.). No two vineyards have exactly the same terroir, although any difference in the resulting wine may be virtually undetectable.

Vineyards are often located on hillsides and planted in soil that is of only marginal value to other plants. A common saying is that "the worse the soil, the better the wine." Planting on hillsides, especially those facing north (in the southern hemisphere) or south (in the northern hemisphere), is most often in an attempt to maximize the amount of sunlight that falls on the vineyard. For this reason, some of the best wines come from vineyards planted on quite steep hills, conditions which would make most other agricultural products uneconomic. The stereotypical vineyard site for wine grapes (in the Northern hemisphere) is a hillside in a dry climate with a southern exposure, good drainage to reduce unnecessary water uptake, and balanced pruning to force the vine to put more of its energy into the fruit, rather than foliage.

The focus on topography, climate and soil is a predominantly French tradition, however, wildfires in California and Australia have also influenced the creation and maintenance of vineyard plantations and grapes in areas at risk of wildfire damage.

== Vignette ==
A vignette is a 500-square-metre vineyard which is part of a larger consolidated vineyard. Investors purchase a piece of land within a vineyard, and outsource the grape maintenance and production operations to an outside grape grower or wine producers. Because they are contracting under a co-operative structure, they benefit from economies of scale and hence cheaper labour and operational costs.

== See also ==
- Vineyard designated wine
