= P-Coumaroylated anthocyanin =

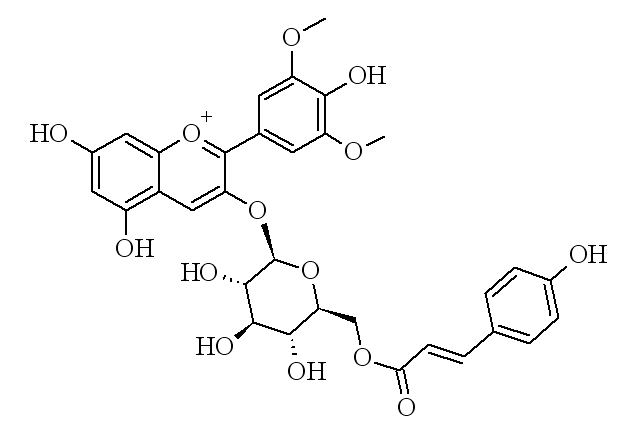
Malvidin-3-O-(6-p-coumaroyl)glucoside

p-Coumaroylated anthocyanins are a type of anthocyanins with a p-coumaric acid unit linked with a sugar to an anthocyanidin aglycone. 3-(6-p-Coumaroyl)glucosides are found in grape and wine. Cyanidin-3-O-(di-p-coumarylglucoside)-5-glucoside is found in dark opal basil. Red leaves of Perilla frutescens also accumulate cyanidin 3-(6-O-p-coumaroyl-β-D-glucoside)-5-(6-O-malonyl-β-D-glucoside).

Delphinidin 3-(6-p-coumaroyl)glucoside is formed by the enzyme anthocyanin 3-O-glucoside 6″-O-hydroxycinnamoyltransferase from delphinidin 3-O-glucoside and p-coumaroyl-CoA in the anthocyanin biosynthesis pathway.

Red-berries vines of the Pinot varieties are known to not synthesize acetylated or para-coumaroylated anthocyanins, as other grape varietals do, only glucosylated anthocyanins.

Anthocyanin 5-aromatic acyltransferase is an enzyme that uses hydroxycinnamoyl-CoA and anthocyanidin-3,5-diglucoside to produce CoA and anthocyanidin 3-glucoside-5-hydroxycinnamoylglucoside. This enzyme can be found in Gentiana triflora.

== See also ==
- Phenolic content in wine
