= Anthocyanidin 3-O-glucosyltransferase =

Class of enzymes

Identifiers
- EC no.: 2.4.1.115
- CAS no.: 65607-32-1

Databases
- IntEnz: IntEnz view
- BRENDA: BRENDA entry
- ExPASy: NiceZyme view
- KEGG: KEGG entry
- MetaCyc: metabolic pathway
- PRIAM: profile
- PDB structures: RCSB PDB PDBe PDBsum
- Gene Ontology: AmiGO / QuickGO
Search
- PMC: articles
- PubMed: articles
- NCBI: proteins

Anthocyanidin 3-O-glucosyltransferase (EC 2.4.1.115) is an enzyme that catalyzes the general chemical reaction

UDP-D-glucose + an anthocyanidin $\rightleftharpoons$ UDP + an anthocyanidin-3-O-beta-D-glucoside

The two substrates of this enzyme are UDP-D-glucose and an anthocyanidin. Its products are uridine diphosphate (UDP) and the corresponding anthocyanidin-3-O-beta-D-glucoside. For example, the enzyme converts delphinidin to myrtillin by adding the glucose unit to the hydroxyl group at the 3-position of the starting material. The enzyme has been characterised from Silene dioica and Vitis vinifera.

delphinidin
+ UDP-glucose
UDP
myrtillin

This enzyme belongs to the family of glycosyltransferases, specifically the hexosyltransferases. The systematic name of this enzyme class is UDP-D-glucose:anthocyanidin 3-O-beta-D-glucosyltransferase. Other names in common use include uridine diphosphoglucose-anthocyanidin 3-O-glucosyltransferase, UDP-glucose:anthocyanidin/flavonol 3-O-glucosyltransferase, UDP-glucose:cyanidin-3-O-glucosyltransferase, UDP-glucose:anthocyanidin 3-O-D-glucosyltransferase, and 3-GT. This enzyme participates in flavonoid biosynthesis.
