= Malvidin-3-O-(6-p-coumaroyl)glucoside =

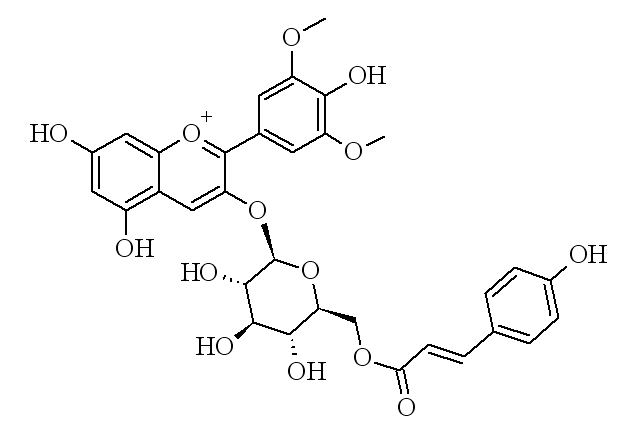

Names
- IUPAC name 4′,5,7-Trihydroxy-3-{6-O-[(2E)-3-(4-hydroxyphenyl)prop-2-enoyl]-β-D-glucopyranosyloxy}-3′,5′-dimethoxyflavylium
- Systematic IUPAC name (4^{2}R,4^{3}S,4^{4}R,4^{5}R,4^{6}S,8E)-1^{4},2^{5},2^{7},4^{3},4^{4},4^{5},10^{4}-Heptahydroxy-1^{3},1^{5}-dimethoxy-7-oxo-2^{1}λ^{4}-3,6-dioxa-2(2,3)-[1]benzopyrana-4(2,6)-oxana-1,10(1)-dibenzenadecaphan-8-en-2^{1}-ylium
- Other names Malvidin 3-O-(6″-p-coumaroyl)glucoside

Identifiers
3D model (JSmol)	Interactive image
ChEBI	CHEBI:192433
ChemSpider	30779237
PubChem CID	71308234
- InChI: InChI=1S/C32H30O14/c1-41-22-9-16(10-23(42-2)27(22)37)31-24(13-19-20(35)11-18(34)12-21(19)44-31)45-32-30(40)29(39)28(38)25(46-32)14-43-26(36)8-5-15-3-6-17(33)7-4-15/h3-13,25,28-30,32,38-40H,14H2,1-2H3,(H3-,33,34,35,36,37)/p+1/t25-,28-,29+,30-,32-/m1/s1 Key: HXQOVGDXCHFLOP-KWNZYCHBSA-O
- SMILES: O[C@@H]4[C@@H](O)[C@H](O)[C@@H](OC2=CC=1C(O)=CC(O)=CC=1[O+]=C2C3=CC(OC)=C(O)C(=C3)OC)O[C@H]4COC(=O)/C=C/C5=CC=C(O)C=C5

Properties
Chemical formula	C_{32}H_{31}O_{14}^{+}
Molar mass	639.58 g/mol
- Except where otherwise noted, data are given for materials in their standard state (at 25 °C [77 °F], 100 kPa). Infobox references

Malvidin-3-O-(6-p-coumaroyl)glucoside is a p-coumaroylated anthocyanin found in grape and wine. There are two forms with the cis and trans isomers of p-coumaric acid. It is a cation.

== See also ==
- Phenolic content in wine
