= Delphinidin-3-O-(6-p-coumaroyl)glucoside =

Names
- IUPAC name 3′,4′,5,5′,7-Pentahydroxy-3-{6-O-[3-(4-hydroxyphenyl)prop-2-enoyl]-β-D-galactopyranosyloxy}flavylium
- Systematic IUPAC name (4^{2}S,4^{3}R,4^{4}S,4^{5}S,4^{6}R,8E)-1^{3},1^{4},1^{5},2^{5},2^{7},4^{3},4^{4},4^{5},10^{4}-Nonahydroxy-7-oxo-3,6-dioxa-2^{1}λ^{4}-2(2,3)-[1]benzopyrana-4(2,6)-oxana-1,10(1)-dibenzenadecaphan-8-en-2^{1}-ylium
- Other names Delphinidin-3-O-p-coumaroyl glucoside

Identifiers
CAS Number	339080-03-4
3D model (JSmol)	Interactive image
ChEBI	CHEBI:75677
ChemSpider	26559505
KEGG	C16370
PubChem CID	15922818
CompTox Dashboard (EPA)	DTXSID801030109
- InChI: InChI=1S/C30H26O14/c31-15-4-1-13(2-5-15)3-6-24(36)41-12-23-26(38)27(39)28(40)30(44-23)43-22-11-17-18(33)9-16(32)10-21(17)42-29(22)14-7-19(34)25(37)20(35)8-14/h1-11,23,26-28,30,38-40H,12H2,(H5-,31,32,33,34,35,36,37)/p+1/t23-,26-,27+,28-,30-/m1/s1 Key: DHTPVCYNNWQRMN-LHRGPQAGSA-O; InChI=1/C30H26O14/c31-15-4-1-13(2-5-15)3-6-24(36)41-12-23-26(38)27(39)28(40)30(44-23)43-22-11-17-18(33)9-16(32)10-21(17)42-29(22)14-7-19(34)25(37)20(35)8-14/h1-11,23,26-28,30,38-40H,12H2,(H5-,31,32,33,34,35,36,37)/p+1/t23-,26-,27+,28-,30-/m1/s1 Key: DHTPVCYNNWQRMN-LEURJHHLBH
- SMILES: c1cc(ccc1/C=C/C(=O)OC[C@@H]2[C@H]([C@@H]([C@H]([C@@H](O2)Oc3cc4c(cc(cc4[o+]c3c5cc(c(c(c5)O)O)O)O)O)O)O)O)O

Properties
Chemical formula	C_{30}H_{27}O^{+}_{14}
Molar mass	611.52 g/mol
- Except where otherwise noted, data are given for materials in their standard state (at 25 °C [77 °F], 100 kPa). Infobox references

Delphinidin 3-O-(6-p-coumaroyl)glucoside is a p-coumaroylated anthocyanin. It can be found in some red Vitis vinifera grape cultivars (like Graciano) and in red wine.

== Biosynthesis ==
The glucoside is formed by the enzyme anthocyanin 3-O-glucoside 6″-O-hydroxycinnamoyltransferase, first characterised from Perilla frutescens, which combines myrtillin and coumaroyl-CoA as part of the anthocyanin biosynthesis pathway.

myrtillin
+ coumaroyl-CoA
delphinidin-3-O-(6-p-coumaroyl)glucoside
+ coenzyme A

== See also ==
- Phenolic compounds in wine
