= International Grape Genome Program =

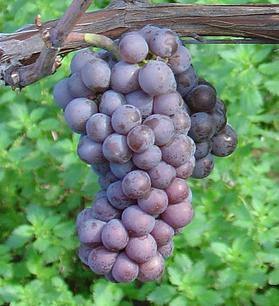
The IGGP's main goals are to improve control, yield and quality in wine grape production via genetic modification.

The International Grape Genomics Program (IGGP) is a collaborative genome project dedicated to determining the genome sequence of the grapevine Vitis vinifera. It is a multinational project involving research centers in Australia, Canada, Chile, France, Germany, Italy, South Africa, Spain, and the United States.

The project was established on the premise that whereas the Vitis family provides the world's most economically important fruit, its biology is still poorly understood. Many centuries of viticulture have provided many well-informed wine-producing centres throughout the world, yet exactly how a grapevine plant responds and interacts with the physical environment and deals with abiotic stresses, pests and diseases is currently unknown.

Agricultural technology surrounding Vitis has been traditionally based upon specific genotypes, which in the main have relied on "vegetative multiplication" and control of growing conditions to improve quality and yield. While advances in quality have certainly been achieved, it has involved increased costs and is in danger of incurring unsustainable environmental overheads. The argument is that the relatively unknown biology of Vitis is capable of delivering desired viticultural improvements without the associated ongoing costs, and establishing its genome sequence will examine the role individual genes play in viticulture, improving grape characteristics and quality in a predictable way.

== Initial discoveries ==
As of March 2007, the project has mapped over half of the grapevine genome. In the course of their research, the Cooperative Research Centre for Viticulture (CRCV), based at the CSIRO Plant Industry Horticulture Unit in Adelaide, Australia (one of the IGGP collaborating centres) discovered that white grapes only exist today as a result of a rare genetic mutation which took place thousands of years ago. White grapes are believed to have arisen due to the extremely rare and independent mutation of two similar and adjacent regulatory genes, VvMYBA1 and VvMYBA2, in a red grape parent.

Most grapevine cultivars can be divided into two groups – red and white – based on the presence or absence of anthocyanin in the skin of the fruit, which the geneticists discovered to be controlled by these two genes. Although either can dictate colour, the VvMYBA1 gene, which activates the anthocyanin biosynthesis necessary to produce red grapes, was shown not to be transcribed in white grape berries. The white berry allele of VvMYBA2 was inactivated by two mutations, one leading to an amino acid substitution and the other to a frameshift mutation. Tests showed that either mutation removes the ability of the regulator to switch on anthocyanin biosynthesis, and when both are switched off it results in a white cultivar. Sequence analyses of the VvMYBA2 gene confirmed that all of the 55 white cultivars tested contained the white berry allele, but not red berry alleles – and all displayed exactly the same double mutation, pointing to a single, common ancestor. Assuming this to be true of all white cultivars, without this single parent vine there would be no white grapes today. White wine residues discovered in ancient Egyptian pottery remains suggest that this mutation occurred at least three thousand years ago, although in lieu of testing against a known white grape genome, the possibility remains that the mutation could have occurred more recently.

A similar dual mutation occurred during the last decade. Viticultor Jesús Galilea Esteban, of the vineyard Murillo de Rio Leza in Rioja, Spain, noticed a white grape mutation in some Tempranillo grapevines growing on his estate. After the white vine was propagated and the mutation did not revert, the new varietal was granted outline permission to apply for approved grape status by the Rioja D.O. and the first hectare of white Tempranillo was planted in the region in the year 2000. Both white and red vines share identical leaves, clusters and berry shape, as well as the short ripening cycles and sensitivity to pests and diseases typical of the red Tempranillo. The mutation is thought to have occurred as a result of environmental factors.

== See also ==
- Genomics
- White Tempranillo
