= Tempranillo blanco =

Variety of grape

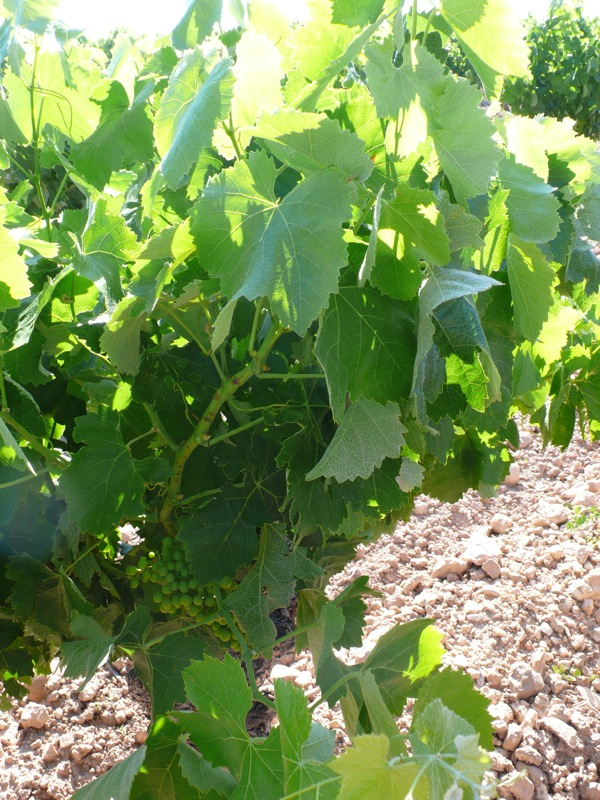
Tempranillo blanco vine with grape clusters pre-veraison.

Tempranillo blanco is a white Spanish wine grape variety that is grown in the Rioja Denominación de Origen (DOC). It is a mutation of the red Tempranillo grape variety that is planted in Rioja. The white grape variety was discovered in a Tempranillo vineyard in the Rioja region by a wine grower in the late 20th century. In 2007, the Consejo Regulador of Rioja officially sanctioned the use of Tempranillo blanco in the DOC wines of Rioja.

== History ==
Tempranillo blanco was discovered in 1988 by a wine grower in a Tempranillo vineyard near Murillo de Río Leza in the La Rioja province of northern Spain. While Tempranillo is a dark-skin variety used to produce red wine, the grower discovered that one of his vines had undergone a mutation that produced yellow-green clusters after veraison.

In the 21st century, the University of La Rioja and the Agricultural Research and Development Centre (CIDA) worked with local wineries (such as Viña Ijalba) to help revive and establish native grape varieties such as Tempranillo.

== Use in Rioja ==
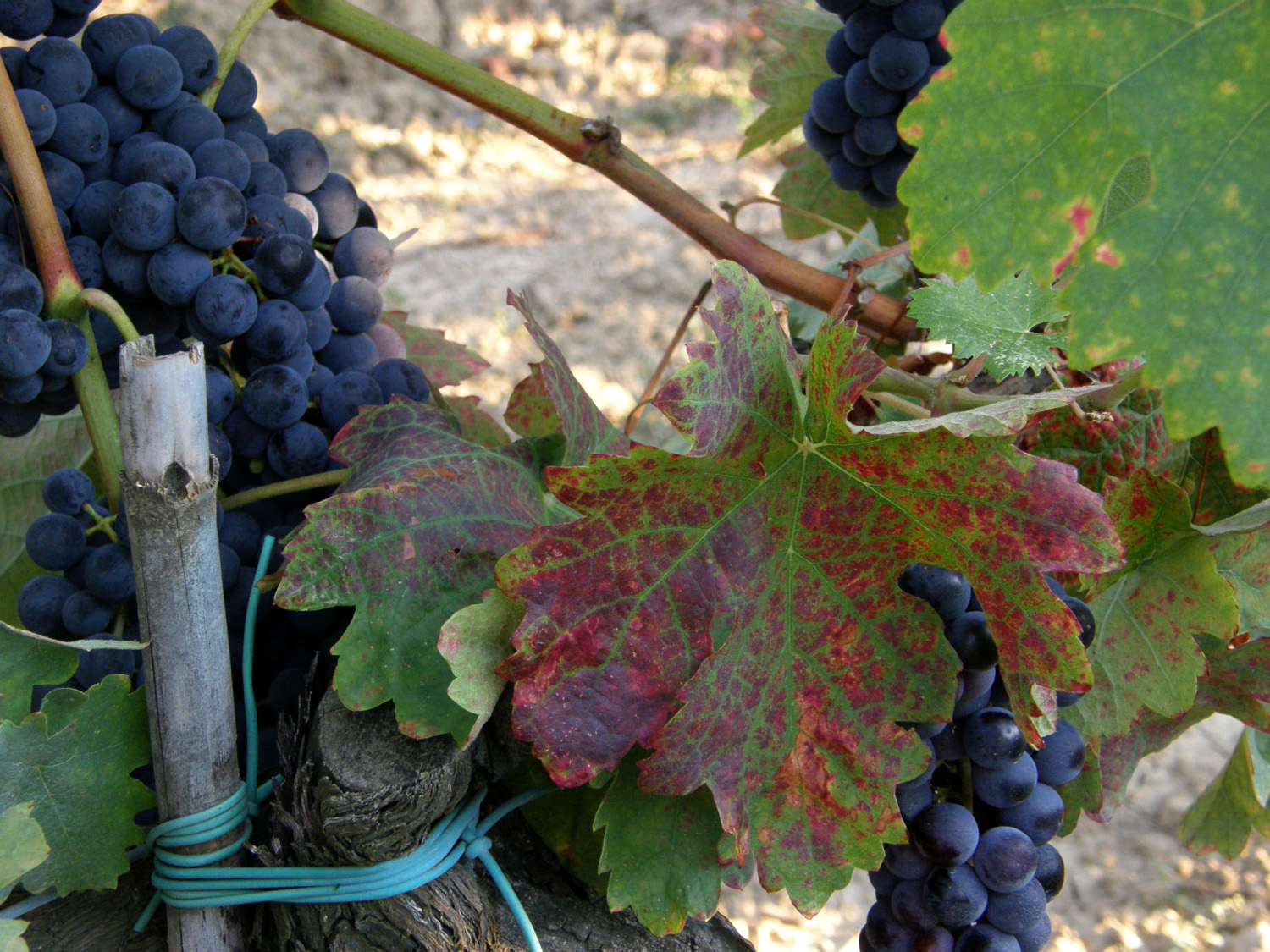
Tempranillo (pictured) is widely grown in Rioja and usually produces darkly colored grapes that are used to make red wine. Tempranillo blanco is a white mutation of this variety.

Currently Tempranillo blanco is found only in the Rioja wine region of Spain. In 2007, the Spanish Institute for Foreign Trade working with the Consejo Regulador of the Rioja region came to an agreement that would allow the planting and use of Tempranillo blanco in white Rioja wines produced under the DOC labels. Tempranillo blanco was one of three native white varieties added to permitted list of Rioja grapes--Maturana Blanca and Turruntés being the others. Additionally, Maturana Tinta, Maturano, Monastel, Chardonnay, Sauvignon Blanc and Verdejo were added with Tempranillo blanco in the first major change of the Rioja wine laws involving grape varieties since the wine region was officially established in 1925.

Under the DOC rules, in order to have new plantings of Tempranillo blanco vineyards must pull up or uproot a previous planting of another variety. Wineries are able to use Tempranillo blanco in blends or as a varietal bottling.

== Viticulture and winemaking ==
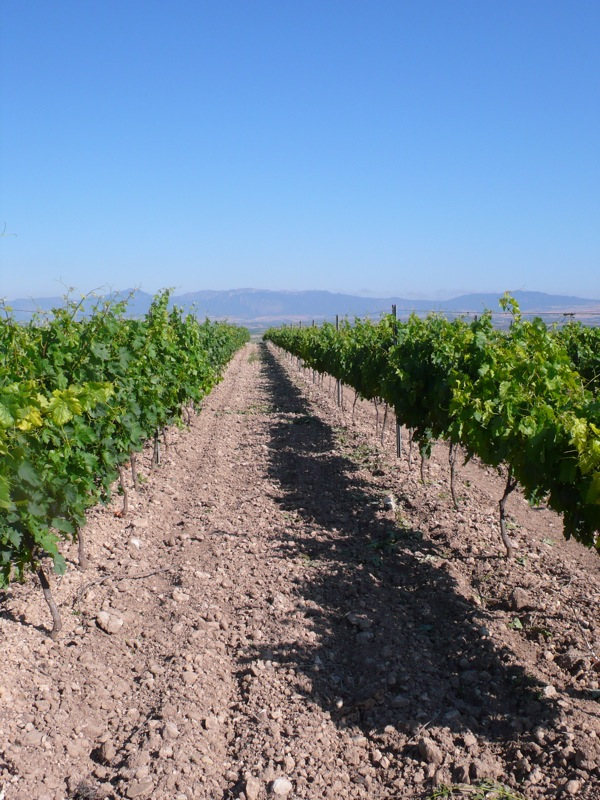
An experimental vineyard with Tempranillo blanco plantings in the Rioja.

Tempranillo blanco produces medium-sized clusters with loose, average size berries that are yellow-green in color. The variety buds late but goes through veraison and ripens early. At harvest the grapes usually have a high malic acid and high levels of aromatic phenolic compounds such as terpenes that contribute floral, tropical and citrus notes to the wine.

As a new variety, growers and winemakers are still learning about Tempranillo blanco and the types of wines it can produce. Winemaker Juan Carlos Sancha of Viña Ijalba, which has 1.5 hectares of the grape planted, describes Tempranillo blanco as having "...fantastic acidity and aromas, and will combine well with Viura."

== Synonyms ==
Among the various synonyms that Tempranillo blanco has been known under include: Albana, Cencibel de la Mancha, Forenses, Temprana, Tempranilla and Tempranillo de la Rioja.
