= Anthocyanin 3-O-glucoside 6''-O-hydroxycinnamoyltransferase =

Class of enzymes

Anthocyanin 3-O-glucoside 6-O-hydroxycinnamoyltransferase

Identifiers
- EC no.: 2.3.1.215

Databases
- IntEnz: IntEnz view
- BRENDA: BRENDA entry
- ExPASy: NiceZyme view
- KEGG: KEGG entry
- MetaCyc: metabolic pathway
- PRIAM: profile
- PDB structures: RCSB PDB PDBe PDBsum
Search
- PMC: articles
- PubMed: articles
- NCBI: proteins

Anthocyanin 3-O-glucoside 6″-O-hydroxycinnamoyltransferase is an enzyme isolated from Perilla frutescens that forms delphinidin-3-O-(6-p-coumaroyl)glucoside from myrtillin and p-coumaroyl-CoA:

myrtillin
+ coumaroyl-CoA
delphinidin-3-O-(6-p-coumaroyl)glucoside
+ coenzyme A

It is an enzyme in the anthocyanin biosynthesis pathway.
