= Myrtillin =

Names
- IUPAC name (2S,3R,4S,5S,6R)-2-[5,7-dihydroxy-2-(3,4,5-trihydroxyphenyl)chromenylium-3-yl]oxy-6-(hydroxymethyl)oxane-3,4,5-triol chloride
- Other names: Mirtillin; Myrtillin chloride; Delphinidin 3-glucoside; Delphinidol 3-glucoside; Delphinidin 3-O-glucoside; Delphinidin 3-monoglucoside; Delphinidine 3-monoglucoside; Delphinidin-3-glucoside chloride; Delphinidin 3-O-β-D-glucoside

Identifiers
CAS Number	6906-38-3
3D model (JSmol)	Interactive image
ChEBI	CHEBI:31463
ChemSpider	391783
KEGG	C12138
PubChem CID	165558
UNII	474A9U89JS
CompTox Dashboard (EPA)	DTXSID901028800
- InChI: InChI=1S/C21H20O12/c22-6-15-17(28)18(29)19(30)21(33-15)32-14-5-9-10(24)3-8(23)4-13(9)31-20(14)7-1-11(25)16(27)12(26)2-7/h1-5,15,17-19,21-22,28-30H,6H2,(H4-,23,24,25,26,27)/p+1/t15-,17-,18+,19-,21-/m1/s1 Key: XENHPQQLDPAYIJ-PEVLUNPASA-O
- SMILES: C1=C(C=C(C(=C1O)O)O)C2=C(C=C3C(=CC(=CC3=[O+]2)O)O)OC4C(C(C(C(O4)CO)O)O)O.[Cl-]

Properties
Chemical formula	C_{21}H_{21}ClO_{12} C_{21}H_{21}O_{12}^{+}, Cl^{−}
Molar mass	500.83 g/mol (chloride); 465.38 g/mol
- Except where otherwise noted, data are given for materials in their standard state (at 25 °C [77 °F], 100 kPa). Infobox references

Myrtillin is an anthocyanin. It is the 3-glucoside of delphinidin. It can be found in plants, most abundantly in black beans, blackcurrant, blueberry, huckleberry, bilberry leaves and in various myrtles, roselle plants, and Centella asiatica plant. It is also present in yeast and oatmeal. The sumac fruit's pericarp owes its dark red colour to anthocyanin pigments, of which chrysanthemin, myrtillin and delphinidin have been identified.

The various colors, such as red, mauve, purple, violet, and blue in Hydrangea macrophylla are developed from myrtillin complexes with metal ions called metalloanthocyanins.

== Biosynthesis and metabolism ==
Anthocyanidin 3-O-glucosyltransferase converts delphinidin to myrtillin in plants including Silene dioica and Vitis vinifera. The glucose unit is transferred from UDP-glucose, giving uridine diphosphate (UDP) as a byproduct.

delphinidin
+ UDP-glucose
UDP
myrtillin

The enzyme anthocyanin 3-O-glucoside 6''-O-hydroxycinnamoyltransferase from Perilla frutescens produces delphinidin 3-(6-p-coumaroyl)glucoside from myrtillin and p-coumaroyl-CoA in the anthocyanin biosynthesis pathway.

myrtillin + coumaroyl-CoA
delphinidin-3-O-(6-p-coumaroyl)glucoside
+ coenzyme A
