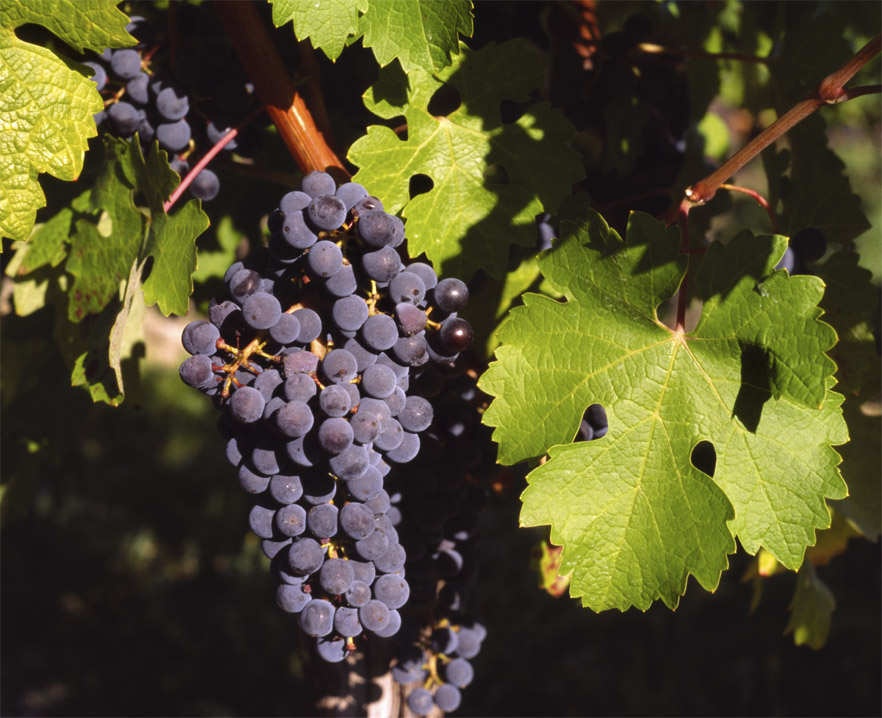

Conservation status
- Least Concern (IUCN 3.1)

Scientific classification
- Kingdom: Plantae
- Clade: Tracheophytes
- Clade: Angiosperms
- Clade: Eudicots
- Clade: Rosids
- Order: Vitales
- Family: Vitaceae
- Genus: Vitis
- Species: V. vinifera

Binomial name
- Vitis vinifera L.

= Vitis vinifera =

Species of flowering plant in the grape vine family

Vitis vinifera, the common grape vine, is a species of flowering plant, native to the Mediterranean region, Central Europe, and southwestern Asia, from Morocco and Portugal north to southern Germany and east to northern Iran. As of 2012, there were between 5,000 and 10,000 varieties of Vitis vinifera grapes though only a few are of commercial significance for wine and table grape production.

The wild grape is sometimes classified as Vitis vinifera var. sylvestris (in some classifications considered Vitis sylvestris), with Vitis vinifera var. vinifera restricted to cultivated forms. Domesticated vines have hermaphrodite flowers, but V. vinifera var. sylvestris is dioecious (male and female flowers on separate plants) and pollination is required for fruit to develop.

Grapes can be eaten fresh or dried to produce raisins, sultanas, and currants. Grape leaves are used in the cuisine of many cultures. The fresh grapes can also be processed into juice that is fermented to make wine and vinegar. Cultivars of Vitis vinifera form the basis of the majority of wines produced around the world. All of the familiar wine varieties belong to Vitis vinifera, which is cultivated on every continent except for Antarctica, and in all the major wine regions of the world.

== History ==
=== Prehistory ===
Changes in pip (seed) shape (narrower in domesticated forms) and distribution suggest that domestication occurred about 4100–3000 BC, in southwest Asia, South Caucasus (Armenia and Georgia), or the Western Black Sea shore region (Bulgaria, Romania). The earliest evidence of domesticated grapes has been found at Gadachrili Gora, near the village of Imiri, Marneuli Municipality, in southeastern Georgia; carbon-dating points to the date of about 6000 BC. The oldest winery in the world (dating to 4100 BC) was found in the Areni-1 cave, which lies in Areni, Armenia. Grape pips dating back to the 5th–4th millennium BC were also found in Shulaveri; others dating back to the 4th millennium BC were also found in Khizanaant Gora. Wild grapes were harvested by neolithic foragers and early farmers. For thousands of years, the fruit has been harvested for both medicinal and nutritional value; its history is intimately entwined with the history of wine.

=== Antiquity ===
Cultivation of the domesticated grape spread to other parts of the Old World in pre-historic or early historic times. The first written accounts of grapes and wine can be found in the Epic of Gilgamesh, an ancient Sumerian text from the 3rd millennium BC. Numerous hieroglyphic references from ancient Egypt also exist, according to which wine was reserved exclusively for priests, state functionaries and the pharaoh.

The grapevine is referenced 55 times in the Hebrew Bible (Old Testament), along with grapes and wine, which are also frequently mentioned (55 and 19, respectively). The Bible lists the grapevine as one of the Seven Species of the Land of Israel, and frequently uses it as a symbol of the Israelites as the chosen people. A detailed description of vineyard maintenance is provided in the Book of Isaiah (5:1–7).

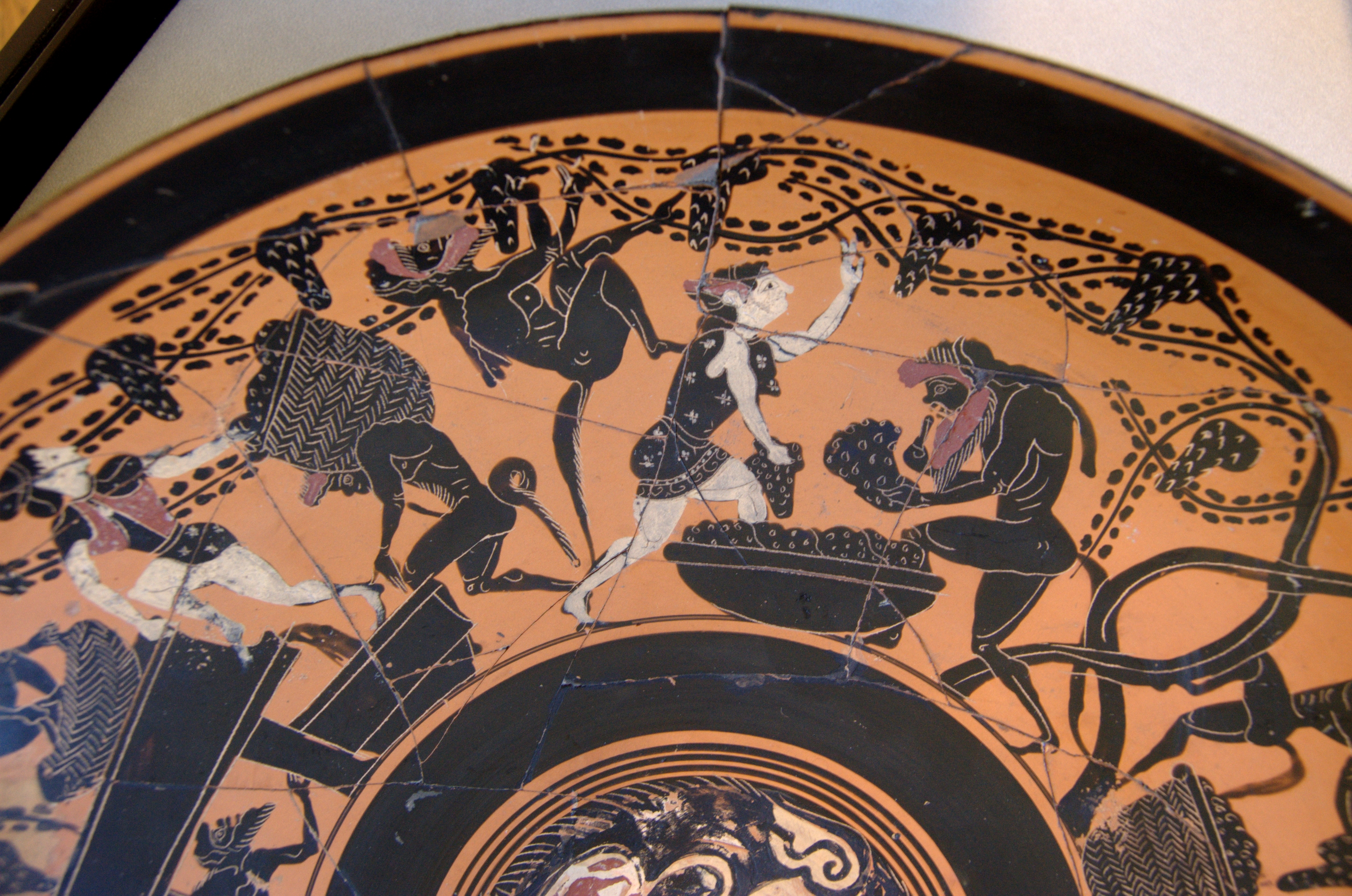
Grape harvest on Etruscan terracotta from the 6th century BC

Hesiod in his Works and Days gives detailed descriptions of grape harvests and wine making techniques, and Homer also makes many references. Greek colonists then introduced these practices in their colonies, especially in southern Italy (Magna Graecia), which was even known as Enotria due to its propitious climate.

The Etruscans improved wine making techniques and developed an export trade even beyond the Mediterranean basin. The ancient Romans further developed the techniques learnt from the Etruscans, as shown by numerous works of literature containing information that remains valid: De Agri Cultura (around 160 BC) by Cato the Elder, De re rustica by Marcus Terentius Varro, the Georgics by Virgil and De re rustica by Columella.

During the 3rd and 4th centuries AD, the long crisis of the Roman Empire generated instability in the countryside which led to a reduction of viticulture in general, which was mainly sustained only close to towns and cities and along coastlines.

=== Medieval era ===
Between the 5th and 10th centuries, viticulture in Europe was sustained almost exclusively by the different religious orders in monasteries. The Benedictines and others extended the grape growing limit northwards and also planted new vineyards at higher altitudes than was customary before. Apart from 'ecclesiastical' viticulture, there also developed, especially in France, a 'noble' viticulture, practiced by the aristocracy as a symbol of prestige. Grape growing was a significant economic activity in the Middle east up to the 7th century, when the expansion of Islam caused it to decline.

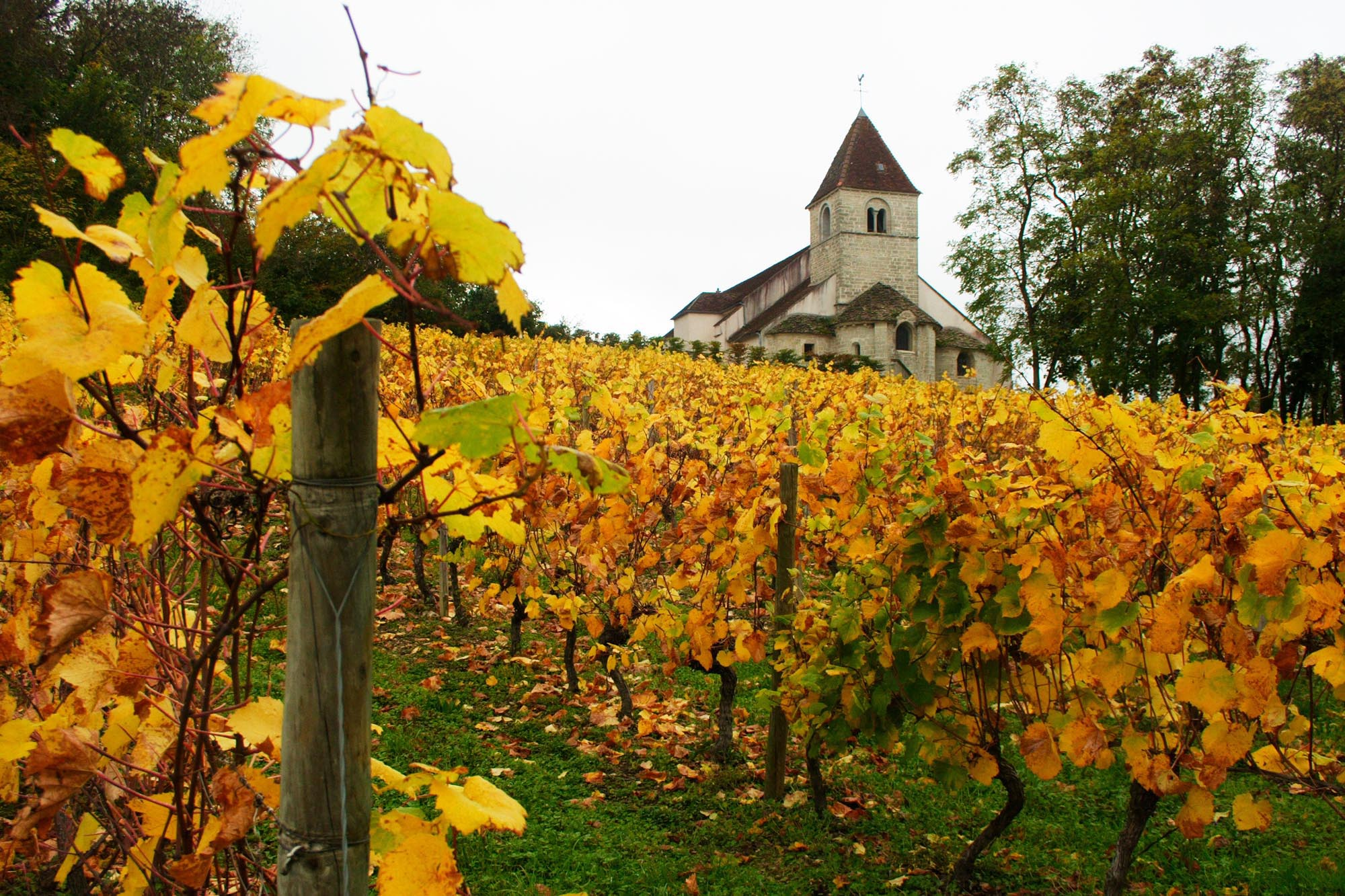
Vineyard in Burgundy

=== Early modern period ===
Between the Low Middle Ages and the Renaissance, viticulture began to flourish again. Demographic pressure, population concentration in towns and cities, and the increased spending power of artisans and merchants gave rise to increased investment in viticulture, which became economically feasible once more. Much was written during the Renaissance on grape growing and wine production, favouring a more scientific approach. This literature can be considered the origin of modern ampelography.

Grapes followed European colonies around the world, coming to North America around the 17th century, and to Africa, South America and Australia. In North America it formed hybrids with native species from the genus Vitis; some of these were intentional hybrids created to combat phylloxera, an insect pest which affected the European grapevine to a much greater extent than North American ones and in fact managed to devastate European wine production in a matter of years. Later, North American rootstocks became widely used to graft V. vinifera cultivars so as to withstand the presence of phylloxera.

=== Contemporary period ===
Genomic information
- NCBI ID: 29760
- Ploidy: diploid
- Genome size: about 500 Mb
- Number of chromosomes: 19 pairs
- Year of completion: 2008
- Sequenced organelle: plastid

In the second half of the 20th century there was a shift in attitude in viticulture from traditional techniques to the scientific method based on fields such as microbiology, chemistry and ampelography. This change came about also due to changes in economic and cultural aspects and in the way of life and in the consumption habits of wide sectors of the population starting to demand quality products.

In 2007, Vitis vinifera was the fourth angiosperm species whose genome was completely sequenced. These data contributed significantly to understanding the evolution of plants and also how the aromatic characteristics of wine are determined in part by the plant's genes. This work was a collaboration between Italian researchers (Consorzio Interuniversitario Nazionale per la Biologia Molecolare delle Piante, Istituto di Genomica Applicata) and French researchers (Genoscope and Institut National de la Recherche Agronomique).

Also in 2007, scientists from Australia's Commonwealth Scientific and Industrial Research Organisation (CSIRO), working in the Cooperative Research Centre for Viticulture, reported that their "research suggests that extremely rare and independent mutations in two genes [VvMYBA1 and VvMYBA2 of red grapes] produced a single white grapevine that was the parent of almost all of the world's white grape varieties. If only one gene had been mutated, most grapes would still be red and we would not have the more than 3000 white grape cultivars available today."

== Description ==
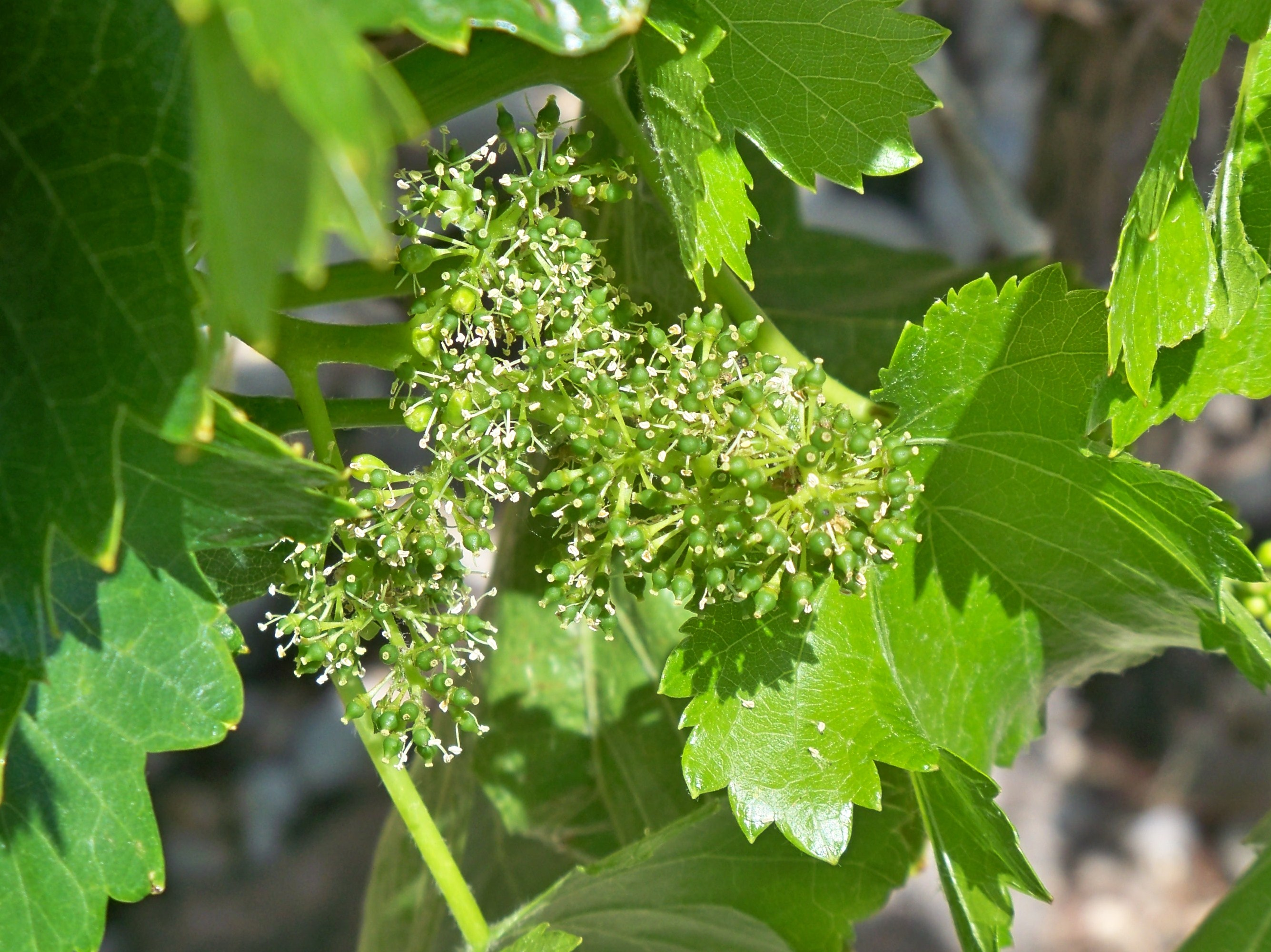
Leaves and inflorescences

A Vitis vinifera plant is a liana growing 12–15 m (40–50 ft) tall at a fast rate. Having a flaky bark, its leaves are alternate, palmately lobed, deciduous, with three to five pointed lobes, coarsely prickly-toothed leaf margins and a heart-shaped foot, 5–20 cm (2–8 in) long and broad. They are glossy dark green on top, light green below, usually hairless.

The vine attaches to supports by tendrils. The stems, called twigs, grow from their tip, the cauline apex. A branch consists of several internodes separated by knots, which grow the leaves, flowers, tendrils and between-core and where to train future buds. During their hardening, the twigs become woody branches that can reach a great length. Its roots usually sink to a depth of 2–5 m (7–16 ft) and sometimes up to 12–15 m (39–49 ft) or even more.

The species typically occurs in humid forests and streamsides.

=== Inflorescences ===
Their flowers, small and greenish to white, are grouped in inflorescences and their fruits, of different shapes depending on the subspecies, are berries grouped in clusters. The calyx is single-leaf with five short, deciduous teeth. The corolla consists of five petals, fused at the top and base, and then falls off in its entirety. Opposite the petals there are five stamens interspersed with glands. The upper ovary bears a very short style with a button-shaped stigma. The wild vine is a dioecious plant, the male and female flowers arise on different plants, but the cultivated forms are hermaphroditic, allowing self-pollination.

The fruit is a berry, known as a grape that is ovoid or globular, dark blue or greenish, usually two-locular with five seeds; in the wild species it is 6 mm (1/4 in) diameter and ripens dark purple to blackish with a pale wax bloom; in cultivated plants it is usually much larger, up to 3 cm (1 1/4 in) long, and can be green, red, or purple (black).

== Distribution ==
V. vinifera accounts for the majority of world wine production; all of the most familiar grape varieties used for wine production belong to V. vinifera.

In Europe, Vitis vinifera is concentrated in the central and southern regions; in Asia, in the western regions such as Anatolia, the Caucasus, the Middle East, and in China; in Africa, along the northern Mediterranean coast and in South Africa; in North America, in California and also other areas like Michigan, New Mexico, New York, Oregon, Virginia, Washington state, British Columbia, Baja California , Ontario and Québec; in South America in Chile, Argentina, Uruguay, Peru and Brazil; and in Oceania in Australia and New Zealand.

== Cultivation ==
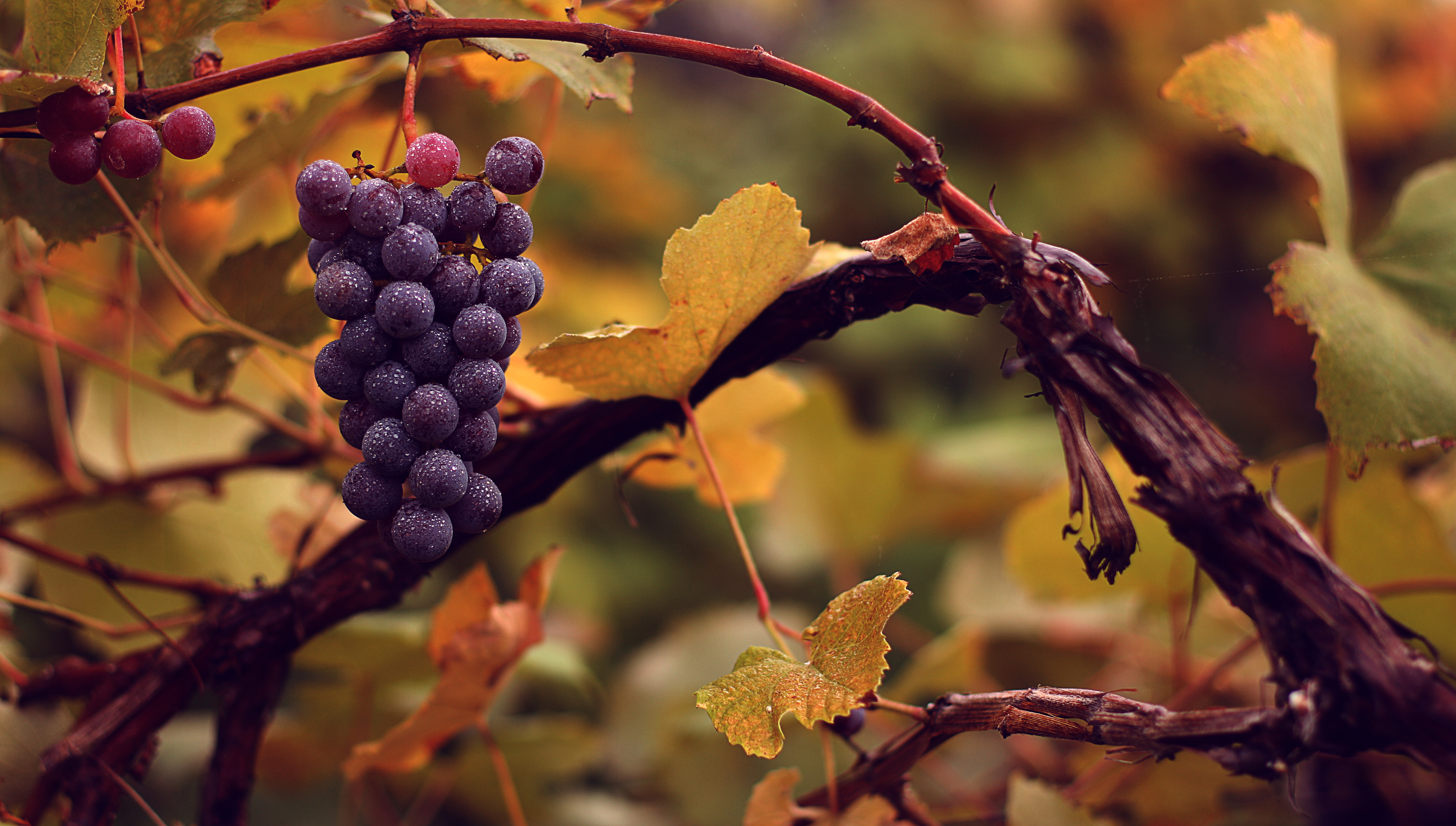
A cultivated Common Grape Vine, Vitis vinifera subsp. vinifera

Use of grapes is known to date back to Neolithic times, following the discovery in 1996 of 7,000-year-old wine storage jars in present-day northern Iran. Further evidence shows the Mesopotamians and Ancient Egyptians had vine plantations and winemaking skills. Greek philosophers praised the healing powers of grapes both whole and in the form of wine. Vitis vinifera cultivation and winemaking in China began during the Han dynasty in the 2nd century with the importation of the species from Ta-Yuan (Syr Darya river valley, Uzbekistan). However, wild vine "mountain grapes" like Vitis thunbergii were being used for wine making before that time. In traditional medicine of India Vitis vinifera is used in prescriptions for cough, respiratory tract catarrh, subacute cases of enlarged liver and spleen, as well as in alcohol-based tonics (Aasavs).

In the Mediterranean Basin, leaves and young stems are traditionally used to feed sheep and goats after grapevine pruning.

Using the sap of grapevines, European folk healers sought to cure skin and eye diseases. Other historical uses include the leaves being used to stop bleeding, pain and inflammation of hemorrhoids. Unripe grapes were used for treating sore throats, and raisins were given as treatments for consumption (tuberculosis), constipation and thirst. Ripe grapes were used for the treatment of cancer, cholera, smallpox, nausea, skin and eye infections as well as kidney and liver diseases.

Seedless grape varieties were developed to appeal to consumers, but researchers are now discovering that many of the healthful properties of grapes may actually come from the seeds themselves, thanks to their enriched phytochemical content.

Grapevine leaves are filled with minced meat (such as lamb, pork or beef), rice and onions in the making of Balkan traditional dolma.

A popular cultivar in Australia, Vitis 'Ornamental Grape', derived from Vitis vinifera × rupestris, is used in gardens for its impressive foliage that turn brilliant red, scarlet, purple and/or orange in autumn. Originally bred in France, it thrives in a range of climates from hot and dry, to cool moist and subtropical, with different soil types benefitting the plant.

=== Climate change ===
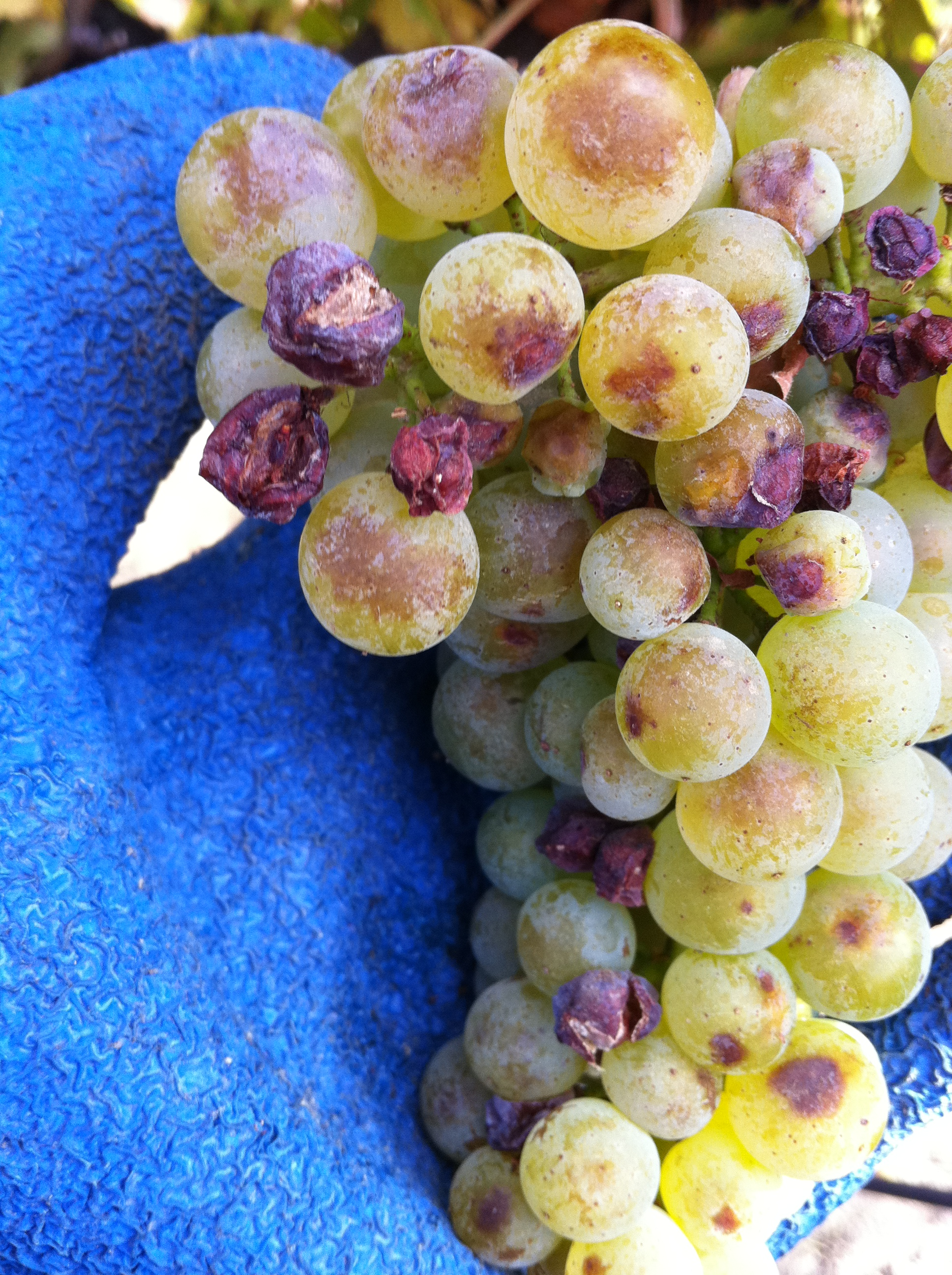
Chardonnay grapes which had been damaged by heat from sunburn

Grapevines are very responsive to their surrounding environment with a seasonal variation in yield of 32.5%. Climate is one of the key controlling factors in grape and wine production, affecting the suitability of certain grape varieties to a particular region as well as the type and quality of the wine produced. Wine composition is largely dependent on the mesoclimate and the microclimate and this means that for high quality wines to be produced, a climate-soil-variety equilibrium has to be maintained. The interaction between climate-soil-variety will in some cases come under threat from the effects of climate change. Identification of genes underlying phenological variation in grape may help to maintain consistent yield of particular varieties in future climatic conditions.

Of all environmental factors, temperature seems to have the most profound effect on viticulture as the temperature during the winter dormancy affects the budding for the following growing season. Prolonged high temperature can have a negative impact on the quality of the grapes as well as the wine as it affects the development of grape components that give colour, aroma, accumulation of sugar, the loss of acids through respiration as well as the presence of other flavour compounds that give grapes their distinctive traits. Sustained intermediate temperatures and minimal day-to-day variability during the growth and ripening periods are favourable. Grapevine annual growth cycles begin in spring with bud break initiated by consistent day time temperatures of 10 degrees Celsius. The unpredictable nature of climate change may also bring occurrences of frosts which may occur outside of the usual winter periods. Frosts cause lower yields and effects grape quality due to reduction of bud fruitfulness and therefore grapevine production benefits from frost free periods.

Organic acids are essential in wine quality. The phenolic compounds such as anthocyanins and tannins help give the wine its colour, bitterness, astringency and anti-oxidant capacity. Research has shown that grapevines exposed to temperature consistently around 30 degrees Celsius had significantly lower concentrations of anthocyanins compared to grapevines exposed to temperatures consistently around 20 degrees Celsius. Temperatures around or exceeding 35 degrees Celsius are found to stall anthocyanin production as well as degrade the anthocyanins that are produced. Furthermore, anthocyanins were found to be positively correlated to temperatures between 16–22 degrees Celsius from veraison (change of colour of the berries) to harvest. Tannins give wine astringency and a "drying in the mouth" taste and also bind onto anthocyanin to give more stable molecules which are important in giving long term colour in aged red wines. As the presence of phenolic compounds in wine are affected heavily by temperature, an increase in average temperatures will affect their presence in wine regions and will therefore affect grape quality.

Altered precipitation patterns are also anticipated (both annually and seasonally) with rainfall occurrences varying in amount and frequency. Increases in the amount of rainfall have will likely cause an increase in soil erosion; while occasional lack of rainfall, in times when it usually occurs, may result in drought conditions causing stress on grapevines. Rainfall is critical at the beginning of the growing season for the budburst and inflorescence development while consistent dry periods are important for the flowering and ripening periods.

Increased CO_{2} levels will likely have an effect on the photosynthetic activity in grapevines as photosynthesis is stimulated by a rise in CO_{2} and has been known to also lead to an increase leaf area and vegetative dry weight. Raised atmospheric CO_{2} is also believed to result in partial stomatal closure which indirectly leads to increased leaf temperatures. A rise in leaf temperatures may alter ribulose 1,5-bisphosphate carboxylase/oxygenase (RuBisCo) relationship with carbon dioxide and oxygen which will also affect the plants' photosynthesis capabilities. Raised atmospheric carbon dioxide is also known to decrease the stomatal density of some grapevine varieties.

==== Cultivation variations ====
The gradually increasing temperatures will lead to a shift in suitable growing regions. It is estimated that the northern boundary of European viticulture will shift north 10 to 30 kilometres (6.2 to 18.6 mi) per decade up to 2020 with a doubling of this rate predicted between 2020 and 2050. This has positive and negative effects, as it opens doors to new cultivars being grown in certain regions but a loss of suitability of other cultivars and may also risk production quality and quantity in general.

==== Adapting wine production ====
Systems have been developed to manipulate the temperatures of vines. These include a chamber free system where air can be heated or cooled and then blown across grape bunches to get a 10 °C (18 °F) differential. Mini chambers combined with shade cloth and reflective foils have also been used to manipulate the temperature and irradiance. Using polyethylene sleeves to cover cordons and canes were also found to increase maximum temperature by 5–8 °C (9.0–14.4 °F) and decrease minimum temperature by 1–2 °C (1.8–3.6 °F).

== Genome ==
There is great interest in the genetic diversity of the Vitis vinifera as it is the world's most important perennial horticultural crop, with an estimated value of approximately US$60 billion with more than 6000 cultivated forms. The species has a relatively small genomes of about 500 Mb, similar to species such as poplar (465 Mbp), Medicago (500 Mbp), and rice (430 Mbp). However, sequencing and assembly of their genomes is particularly challenging due to their high heterozygosity, that is, differences between sister chromosomes (Vitis sp. has 19 chromosome pairs).

There is considerable variation among grape genomes. For instance, the genome of the Vitis vinifera cultivar Mgaloblishvili is much larger than that of V. vinifera ssp. vinifera, with a genome size of 986 Mbp, encoding 58,912 predicted protein-coding genes. For comparison, the human genome only encodes about 20,000 protein-coding genes.

== Chemistry ==
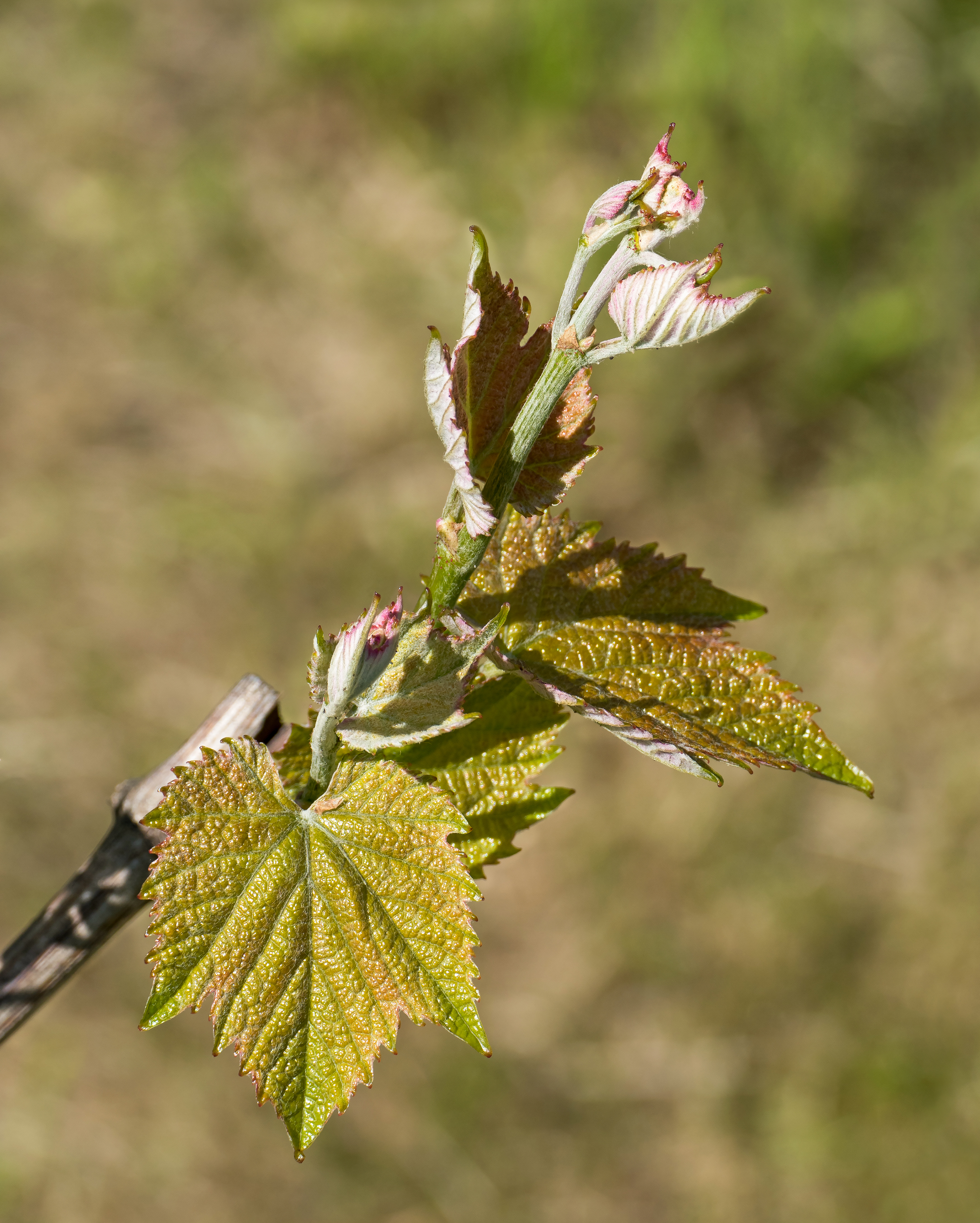
Young grapevine buds and leaves

=== Phenolics ===
V. vinifera contains many phenolic compounds. Anthocyanins can be found in the skin of the berries, hydroxycinnamic acids in the pulp and condensed tannins of the proanthocyanidins type in the seeds. Stilbenoids can be found in the skin and in wood.

==== Stilbenoids ====
Trans-resveratrol is a phytoalexin produced against the growth of fungal pathogens such as Botrytis cinerea and delta-viniferin is another grapevine phytoalexin produced following fungal infection by Plasmopara viticola.

- Astringin

==== Anthocyanins ====
Vitis vinifera red cultivars are rich in anthocyanins that impart their colour to the berries (generally in the skin). The 5 most basic anthocyanins found in grape are:

- Cyanidin-3-O-glucoside
- Delphinidin-3-O-glucoside
- Malvidin-3-O-glucoside
- Petunidin-3-O-glucoside
- Peonidin-3-O-glucoside

Cultivars like Graciano may also contain :

acetylated anthocyanins

- Cyanidin-3-(6-acetyl)-glucoside
- Delphinidin-3-(6-acetyl)-glucoside
- Malvidin-3-(6-acetyl)-glucoside
- Petunidin-3-(6-acetyl)-glucoside
- Peonidin-3-(6-acetyl)-glucoside

coumaroylated anthocyanins

- Cyanidin-3-(6-p-coumaroyl)-glucoside
- Delphinidin-3-(6-p-coumaroyl)-glucoside
- Malvidin-3-(6-p-coumaroyl)-glucoside cis
- Malvidin-3-(6-p-coumaroyl)-glucoside trans
- Petunidin-3-(6-p-coumaroyl)-glucoside
- Peonidin-3-(6-p-coumaroyl)-glucoside

caffeoylated anthocyanins

- Malvidin-3-(6-p-caffeoyl)-glucoside
- Peonidin-3-(6-p-caffeoyl)-glucoside

=== Other chemicals ===
Monoterpenes are present in grape, above all acyclic linalool, geraniol, nerol, citronellol, homotrienol and monocyclic α-terpineol, mostly occurring as glycosides. Carotenoids accumulate in ripening grape berries. Oxidation of carotenoids produces volatile fragments, C13-norisoprenoids. These are strongly odoriferous compounds, such as β-ionone (aroma of viola), damascenone (aroma of exotic fruits), β-damascone (aroma of rose) and β-ionol (aroma of flowers and fruits). Melatonin, an alkaloid, has been identified in grape. In addition, seeds are rich in unsaturated fatty acids, which helps lower levels of total cholesterol and LDL cholesterol in the blood.

== See also ==
- List of grape varieties
- Cru (wine)
- International Grape Genome Program
- List of sequenced plant genomes
- List of sequenced plastomes
- Areni-1 winery
- Vineyard pests
