= Kaempferol =

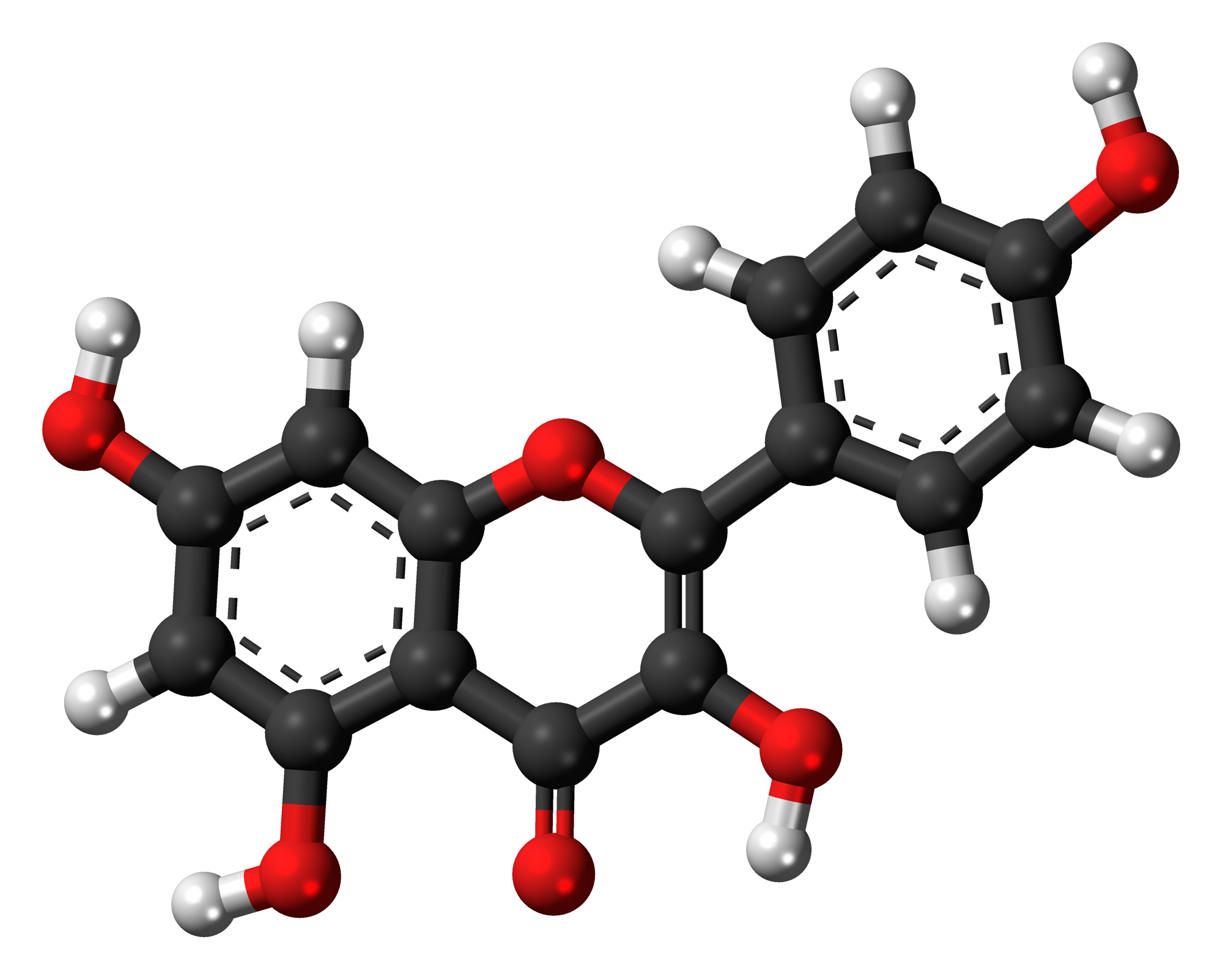

Names
- IUPAC name 3,4′,5,7-Tetrahydroxyflavone
- Systematic IUPAC name 3,5,7-Trihydroxy-2-(4-hydroxyphenyl)-4H-1-benzopyran-4-one
- Other names Kaempherol; Robigenin; Pelargidenolon; Rhamnolutein; Rhamnolutin; Populnetin; Trifolitin; Kempferol; Swartziol

Identifiers
CAS Number	520-18-3
3D model (JSmol)	Interactive image
ChEBI	CHEBI:28499
ChEMBL	ChEMBL150
ChemSpider	4444395
DrugBank	DB01852
ECHA InfoCard	100.007.535
EC Number	208-287-6
KEGG	C05903
PubChem CID	5280863
UNII	731P2LE49E
CompTox Dashboard (EPA)	DTXSID7020768
- InChI: InChI=1S/C15H10O6/c16-8-3-1-7(2-4-8)15-14(20)13(19)12-10(18)5-9(17)6-11(12)21-15/h1-6,16-18,20H Key: IYRMWMYZSQPJKC-UHFFFAOYSA-N
- SMILES: O=c1c(O)c(-c2ccc(O)cc2)oc2cc(O)cc(O)c12

Properties
Chemical formula	C_{15}H_{10}O_{6}
Molar mass	286.23 g/mol
Density	1.688 g/mL
Melting point	276–278 °C
- Except where otherwise noted, data are given for materials in their standard state (at 25 °C [77 °F], 100 kPa). verify (what is ?) Infobox references

Kaempferol (3,4′,5,7-tetrahydroxyflavone) is a natural flavonol, a type of flavonoid, found in a variety of plants and plant-derived foods, including kale, beans, tea, spinach, and broccoli. It is also found in propolis extracts. Kaempferol is a yellow crystalline solid with a melting point of 276–278 °C (529–532 °F). It is slightly soluble in water and highly soluble in hot ethanol, ethers, and DMSO. Kaempferol is named for 17th-century German naturalist Engelbert Kaempfer.

== Natural occurrence ==
Kaempferol is a secondary metabolite found in many plants, plant-derived foods, and traditional medicines. Its flavor is considered bitter.

=== In plants and food ===
Kaempferol is common in Pteridophyta, Pinophyta, and Angiospermae. Within Pteridophyta and Pinophyta, kaempferol has been found in diverse families. Kaempferol has also been identified in Dicotyledons and Monocotyledons of Angiosperms. The total average intake of flavonols and flavones in a normal diet is estimated as 23 mg/day, to which kaempferol contributes approximately 17%. Common foods that contain kaempferol include: apples, grapes, tomatoes, green tea, potatoes, onions, broccoli, Brussels sprouts, squash, cucumbers, lettuce, green beans, peaches, blackberries, raspberries, and spinach. Plants that are known to contain kaempferol include Aloe vera, Coccinia grandis, Cuscuta chinensis, Euphorbia pekinensis, Glycine max, Hypericum perforatum, Pinus sylvestris, Moringa oleifera, Rosmarinus officinalis, Sambucus nigra, Toona sinensis, and Ilex. It also is present in endive. In plants, kaempferol is very often glycosylated; the following table lists the summed contents of all kaempferol glycosides found in each source, expressed as a weight of the actual kaempferol moiety (i.e. the amount of kaempferol that would remain following hydrolysis). It does not imply that any of these sources actually contain kaempferol itself.

Foods	Kaempferol (mg/100 g)
capers, raw	259
saffron	205
capers, canned	131
arugula, raw	59
kale, raw	47
mustard greens, raw	38
ginger	34
common bean, raw	26
chinese cabbage, raw	23
dill, fresh	13
garden cress, raw	13
chive, raw	10
dock, raw	10
endive, raw	10
collard, raw	9
broccoli, raw	8
fennel leaves	7
goji berry, dried	6
drumstick leaves, raw	6
chard, raw	4

== Biosynthesis ==
The biosynthesis of kaempferol occurs in four major steps:

- Phenylalanine is converted into 4-coumaroyl-CoA
- 4-Coumaroyl-CoA combines with three molecules of malonyl-CoA to form naringenin chalcone (tetrahydroxychalcone) through the action of the enzyme chalcone synthase
- Naringenin chalcone is converted to naringenin and then a hydroxyl group is added to form dihydrokaempferol
- Dihydrokaempferol has a double bond introduced into it to form kaempferol

The amino acid phenylalanine is formed from the Shikimate pathway, which is the pathway that plants use in order to make aromatic amino acids. This pathway is located in the plant plastid, and is the entry to the biosynthesis of phenylpropanoids.

The phenylpropanoid pathway is the pathway that converts phenylalanine into tetrahydroxychalcone. Flavonols, including kaempferol, are products of this pathway.
