= Prunin =

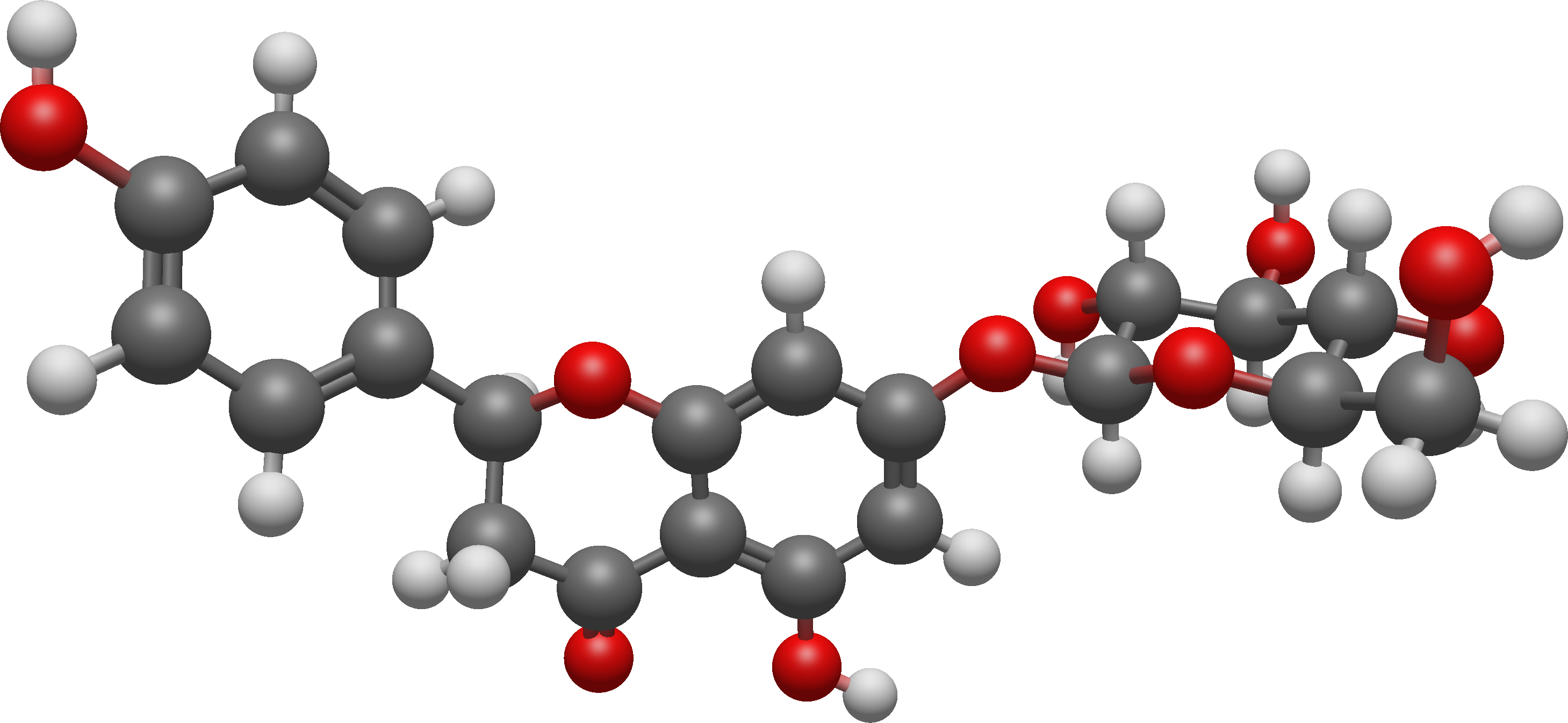

Names
- IUPAC name (2S)-7-(β-D-Glucopyranosyloxy)-4′,5-dihydroxyflavan-4-one
- Systematic IUPAC name (2S)-5-Hydroxy-2-(4-hydroxyphenyl)-7-{[(2S,3R,4S,5S,6R)-3,4,5-trihydroxy-6-(hydroxymethyl)oxan-2-yl]oxy}-2,3-dihydro-4H-1-benzopyran-4-one
- Other names Naringenin-7-O-glucoside

Identifiers
CAS Number	529-55-5
3D model (JSmol)	Interactive image
ChEBI	CHEBI:28327
ChemSpider	83766
ECHA InfoCard	100.007.696
KEGG	C09099
PubChem CID	92794
UNII	LSB8HDX4E5
CompTox Dashboard (EPA)	DTXSID40967365
- InChI: InChI=1S/C21H22O10/c22-8-16-18(26)19(27)20(28)21(31-16)29-11-5-12(24)17-13(25)7-14(30-15(17)6-11)9-1-3-10(23)4-2-9/h1-6,14,16,18-24,26-28H,7-8H2/t14-,16+,18+,19-,20+,21+/m0/s1 Key: DLIKSSGEMUFQOK-SFTVRKLSSA-N; InChI=1/C21H22O10/c22-8-16-18(26)19(27)20(28)21(31-16)29-11-5-12(24)17-13(25)7-14(30-15(17)6-11)9-1-3-10(23)4-2-9/h1-6,14,16,18-24,26-28H,7-8H2/t14-,16+,18+,19-,20+,21+/m0/s1 Key: DLIKSSGEMUFQOK-SFTVRKLSBO
- SMILES: C1[C@H](OC2=CC(=CC(=C2C1=O)O)O[C@H]3[C@@H]([C@H]([C@@H]([C@H](O3)CO)O)O)O)C4=CC=C(C=C4)O

Properties
Chemical formula	C_{21}H_{22}O_{10}
Molar mass	434.397 g·mol^{−1}
- Except where otherwise noted, data are given for materials in their standard state (at 25 °C [77 °F], 100 kPa). Infobox references

Prunin is a flavanone glycoside found in immature citrus fruits and in tomatoes. Its aglycone form is called naringenin.

== Biosynthesis ==
Flavonoid biosynthesis in plants uses a phenylpropanoid metabolic pathway in which the amino acid phenylalanine is converted to 4-coumaroyl-CoA. This is combined with three units of malonyl-CoA to yield a group of compounds called chalcones, which contain two phenyl rings. In the main pathway, the enzymes chalcone synthase and chalcone isomerase produce (S)-naringenin which is the immediate precursor for prunin.

Flavanone 7-O-beta-glucosyltransferase uses UDP-glucose to transfer a sugar group to one of the phenolic hydroxyl groups of (S)-naringenin.

naringenin
+ UDP-glucose
prunin
+ UDP

In some citrus fruits, the product prunin is converted to naringin, a compound which is responsible for the bitter taste of grapefruit.

prunin
+ UDP-rhamnose
naringin
+ UDP

Flavanone 7-O-glucoside 2"-O-beta-L-rhamnosyltransferase uses UDP-rhamnose to add the second sugar component.

== Metabolism in the human gut ==
Glucosidase breaks dietary prunin back into glucose and naringenin.
