= Xanthohumol =

- Chemical structure of xanthohumol

Names
- Preferred IUPAC name (E)-1-[2,4-dihydroxy-6-methoxy-3-(3-methylbut-2-enyl)phenyl]-3-(4-hydroxyphenyl)prop-2-en-1-one

Identifiers
CAS Number	6754-58-1
3D model (JSmol)	Interactive image
ChEBI	CHEBI:66331
ChEMBL	ChEMBL253896
ChemSpider	555077
ECHA InfoCard	100.123.285
PubChem CID	639665
RTECS number	UD5574117
UNII	T4467YT1NT
CompTox Dashboard (EPA)	DTXSID00893171
- InChI: InChI=1S/C21H22O5/c1-13(2)4-10-16-18(24)12-19(26-3)20(21(16)25)17(23)11-7-14-5-8-15(22)9-6-14/h4-9,11-12,22,24-25H,10H2,1-3H3/b11-7+ Key: ORXQGKIUCDPEAJ-YRNVUSSQSA-N
- SMILES: O=C(c1c(OC)cc(O)c(c1O)C/C=C(\C)C)\C=C\c2ccc(O)cc2

Properties
Chemical formula	C_{21}H_{22}O_{5}
Molar mass	354.402 g·mol^{−1}
Density	1.24 g/cm^{3}
Melting point	157–159 °C (315–318 °F; 430–432 K)
- Except where otherwise noted, data are given for materials in their standard state (at 25 °C [77 °F], 100 kPa). verify (what is ?) Infobox references

Xanthohumol is a natural product found in the female inflorescences of Humulus lupulus, also known as hops. This compound is also found in beer and belongs to a class of compounds that contribute to the bitterness and flavor of hops. Xanthohumol is a prenylated chalconoid, biosynthesized by a type III polyketide synthase (PKS) and subsequent modifying enzymes.

== Biosynthesis ==
Xanthohumol is a prenylated chalconoid derived from a plant type III PKS, and is synthesized in the glandular trichromes of hop cones. L-Phenylalanine serves as the starting material, which is converted to cinnamic acid by the PLP-dependent phenylalanine ammonia lyase. Cinnamic acid is oxidized by cinnamate-4-hydroxylase and loaded onto coenzyme A (CoA) by 4-coumarate CoA ligase to yield 4-hydroxy-cinnamoyl CoA, the starter unit for PKS extension. This molecule is extended three times with malonyl CoA, cyclized through a Claisen condensation, and aromatized through tautomerization to form naringenin chalcone (chalconaringenin). This intermediate has the potential to form a variety of different products depending on the enzymes that modify the core structure. In the case of xanthohumol, a prenyltransferase called Humulus lupulus prenyltransferase 1 (HlPT-1) attaches a molecule of dimethylallyl pyrophosphate from the DXP pathway. HlPT-1 has a broad substrate specificity and also participates in making other prenylated flavonoids in the hop plant. Finally, an O-methyltransferase methylates a phenol substituent using S-adenosyl methionine. Total syntheses of xanthohumol and derivatives have been achieved, though extraction from hops remains a primary source.

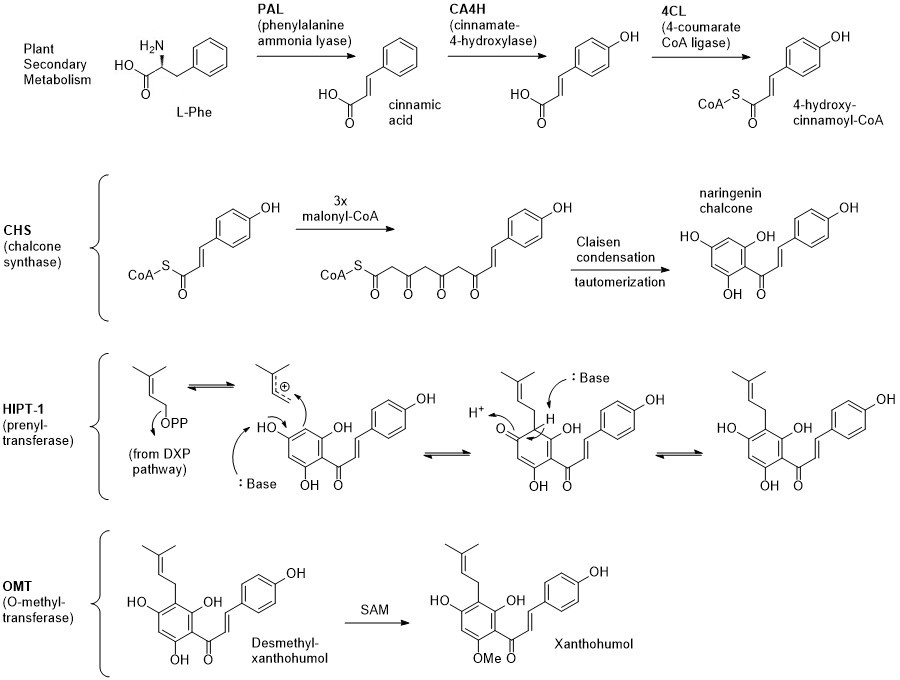
The biosynthesis of Xanthohumol utilizes building blocks from plant secondary metabolism, and is catalyzed by a type III PKS and accessory modifying enzymes.

== Beer ==
In commercial beers, the concentration of xanthohumol ranges from about 2 μg/L – 1.2 mg/L. During the brewing process, xanthohumol and other prenylated flavonoids are lost as they are converted to the corresponding flavanones. Different hop varieties and different beers contain varying quantities of xanthohumol.

== Research ==
Xanthohumol is under basic research for its potential biological properties. Xanthohumol can be extracted with pressurized hot water. Xanthohumol may have potential as a killer of bladder cancer.

== See also ==
- Isobavachalcone, a closely related prenylated chalconoid
- Isoxanthohumol, the corresponding prenylated flavanone
- 8-Prenylnaringenin, a related prenylflavanoid with estrogenic activity
- Alpha acids, a class of bitter compounds in hops
- Myrcene, humulene, and caryophyllene, essential oils in hops
