= Tricin =

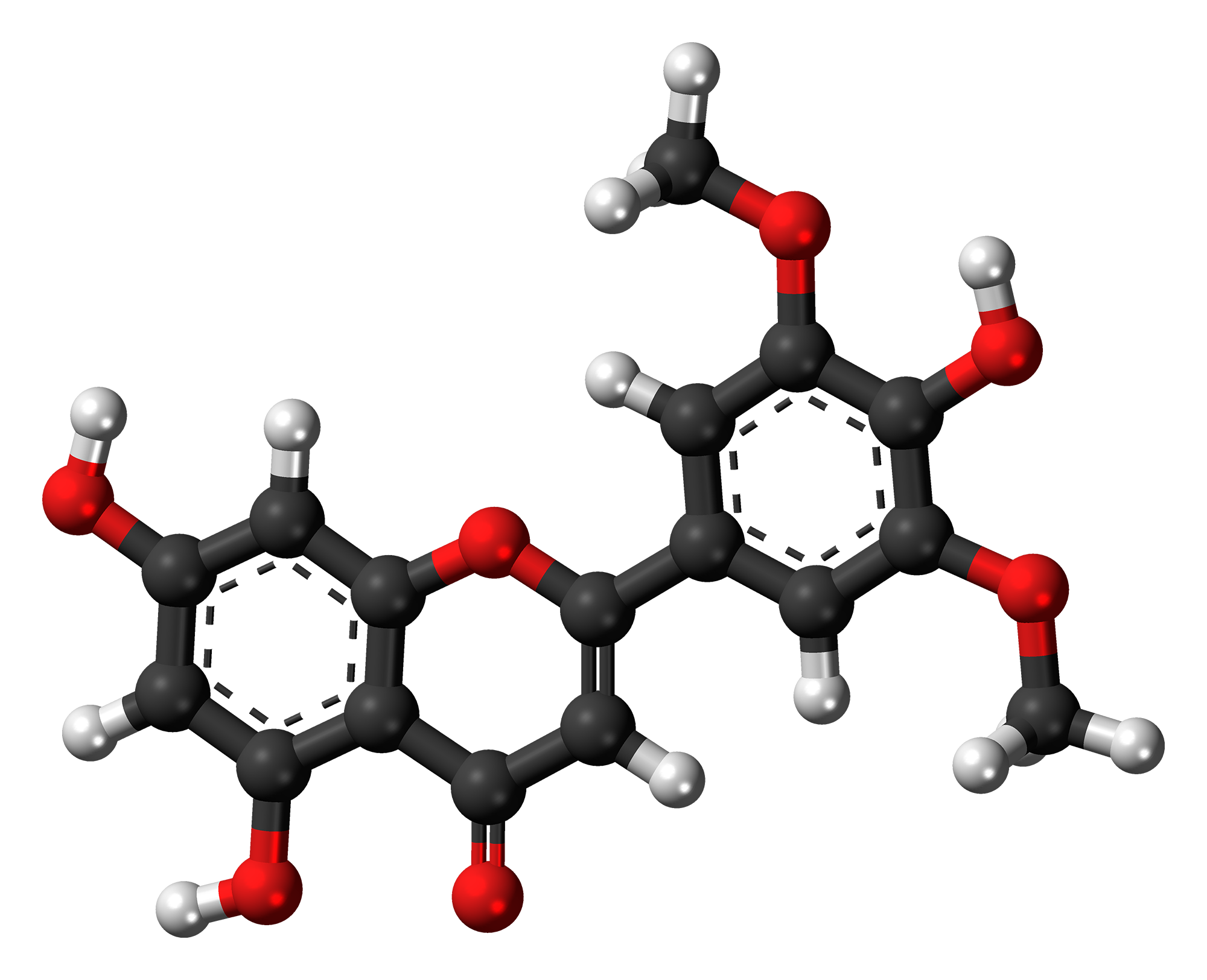

Names
- IUPAC name 4′,5,7-Trihydroxy-3′,5′-dimethoxyflavone
- Systematic IUPAC name 5,7-Dihydroxy-2-(4-hydroxy-3,5-dimethoxyphenyl)-4H-1-benzopyran-4-one
- Other names Tricetin 3′,5′-dimethyl ether

Identifiers
CAS Number	520-32-1
3D model (JSmol)	Interactive image
ChEBI	CHEBI:59979
ChEMBL	ChEMBL454320
ChemSpider	4445019
KEGG	C10193
PubChem CID	5281702
UNII	D51JZL38TQ
CompTox Dashboard (EPA)	DTXSID20199965
- InChI: InChI=1S/C17H14O7/c1-22-14-3-8(4-15(23-2)17(14)21)12-7-11(20)16-10(19)5-9(18)6-13(16)24-12/h3-7,18-19,21H,1-2H3 Key: HRGUSFBJBOKSML-UHFFFAOYSA-N
- SMILES: COC1=CC(=CC(=C1O)OC)C2=CC(=O)C3=C(C=C(C=C3O2)O)O

Properties
Chemical formula	C_{17}H_{14}O_{7}
Molar mass	330.29 g/mol
- Except where otherwise noted, data are given for materials in their standard state (at 25 °C [77 °F], 100 kPa). verify (what is ?) Infobox references

Tricin is a chemical compound. It is an O-methylated flavone, a type of flavonoid. It can be found in rice bran and sugarcane.

== Glycosides ==
- Tricin 4'-glucoside (Tricin-4'-O-beta-D-glucopyranaoside, CAS number 71855-50-0)
- Tricin 5-glucoside (Tricin 5-O-beta-D-glucopyranoside, CAS number 32769-00-9)
- Tricin 7-O-glucoside (Tricin 7-O-beta-D-glucopyranoside, CAS number 32769-01-0)

== Biosynthesis ==
The biosynthesis of flavones has not yet been elucidated in full; however, most of the mechanistic and enzymatic steps have been discovered and studied. In biosynthesizing tricin, there is first stepwise addition of malonyl-CoA via the polyketide pathway and p-coumaroyl-CoA via the phenylpropanoid pathway. These additions are mediated by the sequential action of chalcone synthase and chalcone isomerase to yield naringenin chalcone and the flavanone, naringenin, respectively. CYP93G1 of the CYP450 superfamily in rice then desaturates naringenin into apigenin. After this step, it is proposed that flavonoid 3',5'-hydroxylase (F3',5'H) changes apigenin into tricetin. Upon formation of tricetin, 3'-O-methyltransferase and 5'-O-methyltransferase add methoxy groups to tricetin to form tricin.

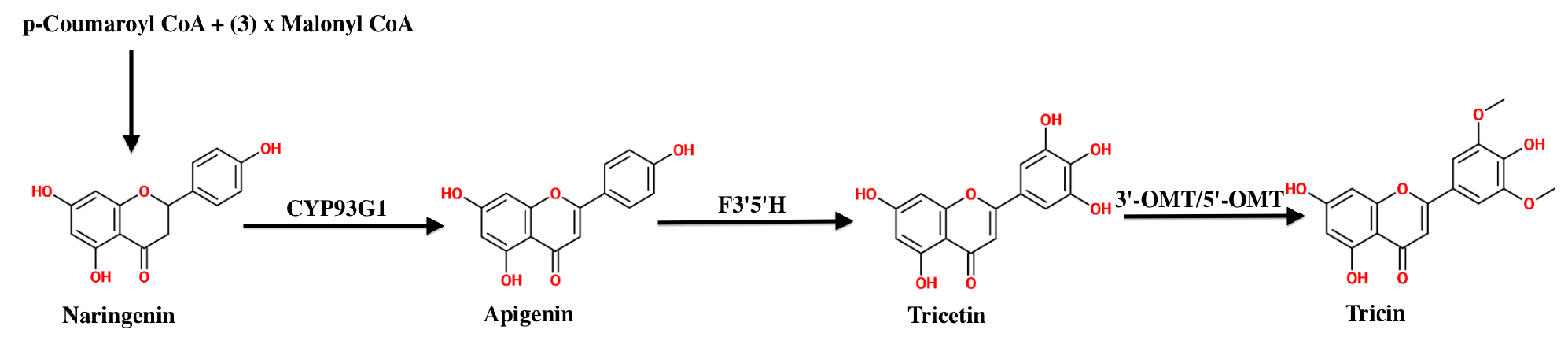
p-Coumaroyl-CoA and malonyl-Coa units are synthesized together to form naringenin. The biosynthetic pathway then follows to form tricin.

== Other compounds formed from tricin ==
Three flavonolignans derived from tricin have been isolated from oats Avena sativa.
