= Anthochlor pigments =

Group of plant metabolites

Anthochlor pigments (ἄνθος anthos = flower; χλωρός chlōrós = yellowish) are a group of secondary plant metabolites and with carotenoids and some flavonoids produce yellow flower colour. Both, chalcones and aurones are known as anthochlor pigments. Anthochlor pigments serve as UV nectar guides in some plants. Important anthochlor pigments accumulating plants are from the genus Coreopsis, Snapdragon (Antirrhinum majus) or Bidens ferulifolia.

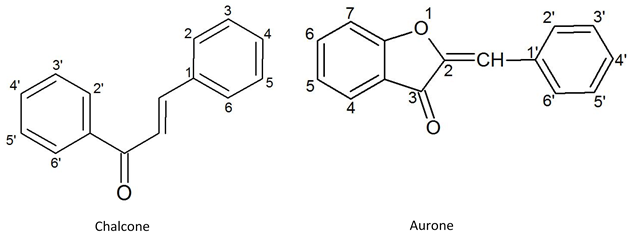
Basic structure of chalcones and aurones.

== History ==
Botanists began early to deal with the distribution of yellow flower colouration pigments, especially with carotenoids and yellow flavonoids. The first reference of yellow pigments with properties resembling those of anthochlor pigments is mentioned by Fremy and Cloez in 1854. However, there are only a few and often contrary references pertaining to anthochlor pigments in the literature, which is perhaps down to the fact that "…the anthochlor [pigment] occurs only rarely in the plant kingdom and we [the botanists] are used to attributing yellow colouration of blossoms somewhat indiscriminately to carotenoids".

== Classification ==
Though anthochlors are frequently ranked among flavonoids, their structure cannot be derived from the flavonoid skeleton. Some plants (especially Asteraceae) accumulate two types of anthochlor pigments. On the one hand, the hydroxytypes of chalcones and aurones, on the other hand the deoxy-types of chalcones and their corresponding aurones. Both types differ only in the presence of an hydroxyl group in the 6' position of the B-ring (chalcones) or the 4 position of the A-ring (aurones), respectively. Hydroxychalcones are intermediates of the subsequent biosynthesis of flavonoids and quickly isomerize to flavanones either chemically or enzymatically. Thus, hydroxychalcones cannot be accumulated in plants.

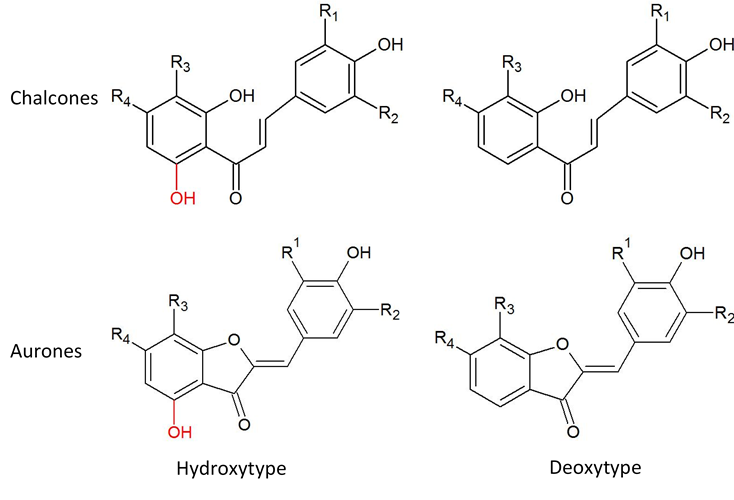
Different anthochlor pigment types.

Different anthochlor pigments and their classes and types
Name	Class	Type	R1	R2	R3	R4
Isoliquiritigenin	Chalcone	Deoxy	H	H	H	OH
Isoliquiritigenin 4'-O-β-d-Glucoside	Chalcone	Deoxy	H	H	H	OGlc
Butein	Chalcone	Deoxy	H	OH	H	OH
Butein 4'-O-β-d-Glucoside	Chalcone	Deoxy	OH	H	H	OGlc
Robtein	Chalcone	Hydroxy	OH	OH	H	OH
Robtein 4'-O-β-d-Glucoside	Chalcone	Hydroxy	OH	OH	OH	OGlc
Okanin	Chalcone	Hydroxy	OH	H	OH	OH
Marein (Okanin 4'-O-β-d-Glucoside)	Chalcone	Hydroxy	OH	H	OH	OGlc
Sulfuretin	Aurone	Deoxy	OH	H	H	OH
Sulfuretin 6-O-β-d-Glucoside	Aurone	Deoxy	OH	H	H	OGlc
Maritimetin	Aurone	Deoxy	OH	H	OH	OH
Maritimein (Maritimetin 6-O-β-d-Glucoside)	Aurone	Deoxy	OH	H	OH	OGlc
3',4',5',6-Tetrahydroxyaurone	Aurone	Hydroxy	OH	OGlc	H	OH
3',4',5',6-Tetrahydroxyaurone 6-O-β-d-Glucoside	Aurone	Hydroxy	OH	OGlc	H	OH

== Biosynthesis ==
The formation of anthochlor pigments is based on the biosynthesis pathway common to all flavonoids. The key to the process is the enzyme chalcone synthase (CHS), which catalyzes the formation of a hydroxyl chalcone from three molecules of malonyl-CoA and one molecule cinnamoyl-CoA. Functioning as intermediates of the subsequent biosynthesis of flavonoids, hydroxyl chalcones are not chemically stable and quickly isomerize to flavanones. However, some plants are capable of accumulating hydroxyaurones, formed by the enzyme aurone synthase (AUS).

In the presence of the enzyme chalcone reductase (CHR) and NADPH as a co-factor, the oxygen function of the polyketide intermediate is reduced and eliminated as water prior to cyclization, resulting in the formation of 6'-deoxychalcones. In contrast to hydroxychalcones, deoxychalcones are chemically stable and therefore can be accumulated in plants.

Parallel to the monooxygenase flavonoid 3'-hydroxylase, the enzyme chalcone 3-hydroxylase catalyzes the hydroxylation at the C3-position of the A-ring of chalcones. This additional hydroxyl group causes a shift of light absorption and leads to a slightly different yellow tone when the chalcone is accumulated in plants.

Likewise hydroxychalcones, deoxychalcones can be converted to the corresponding aurones, catalyzed by the enzyme aurone synthase (AUS).

Subsequent processes can include methylation, glycosylation and acetylation.

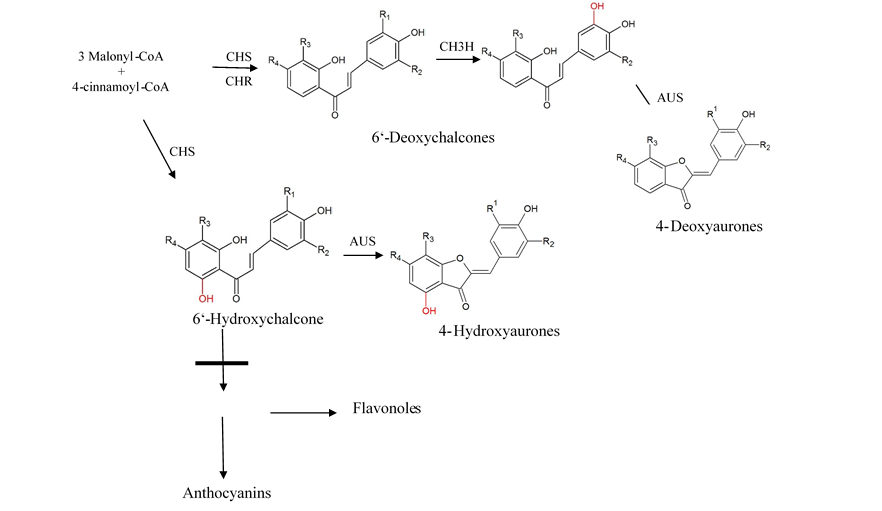
General biosnythesis pathway of anthochlor pigments.

== Ecological relevance ==
Yellow flower colouration appeared as an adaption to the colour sense of insects in order to attract those as pollinators. Many Asteraceae accumulate carotenoids as well as anthochlor pigments [7]. In Bidens ferulifolia (Jacq.) carotenoids are spread evenly across the petals whereas anthochlor pigments are accumulated at the petal base. Whilst the flowers appear monochromatic yellow to humans, the petals appear two-coloured to UV-sensitive insects, because of the different UV absorption of carotenoids and anthochlor pigments. Plants use this phenomenon for guiding pollinators to the petal center [Fig. 4].

Apart from providing yellow flower colouration, anthochlor pigments play an indispensable role in the floral immune system and plant health.

== Verification ==
Exposing anthochlors to ammonia or alkaline vapour of cigarettes results in a colour shift from yellow to orange. This is an easy approach to detecting anthochlor pigments. This is due to the pH dependent transition of the undissociated phenol groups to phenolates, which results in a bathochromatic shift of approximately 100 nm from the violet to the blue range of the spectrum. The corresponding shift of the reflected wavelengths is perceived as a colour switch to the human eye

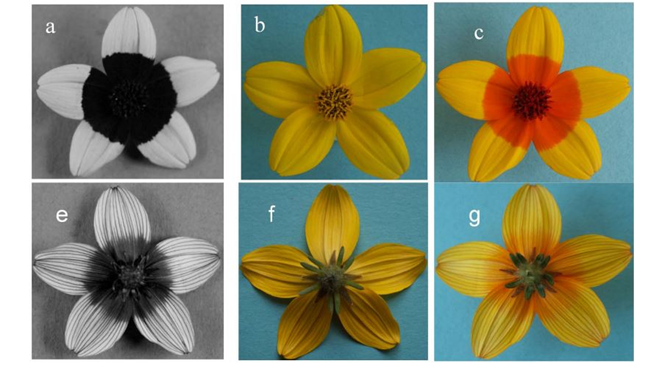
Honey guides of Bidens ferulifolia: UV-photography of the front (a) and back (e); daylight photography before (b + f) and after (c + g) ammonia staining.

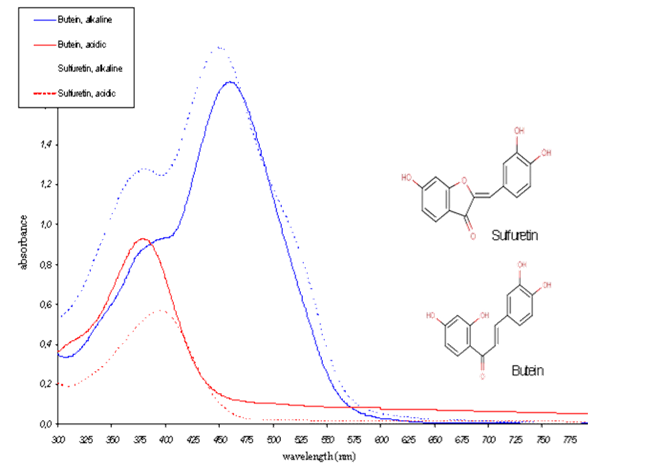
Spectrophotometry: Changes of light absorbance of the chalcone butein and the aurone sulfurin in dependence of pH.
