= C21H20O11 =

The molecular formula C_{21}H_{20}O_{11} (molar mass: 448.38 g/mol, exact mass: 448.100561 u) may refer to:

- Astragalin, a flavonol
- Cynaroside, a flavone
- Kaempferol 7-O-glucoside, a flavonol
- Isoorientin, a flavone
- Maritimein, an aurone
- Orientin, a flavone
- Quercitrin, a flavonol
- Rhodionin, a flavonol rhamnoside
- Trifolin, a flavanol galactoside
