= Tricin synthase =

Identifiers
- EC no.: 2.1.1.175

Databases
- IntEnz: IntEnz view
- BRENDA: BRENDA entry
- ExPASy: NiceZyme view
- KEGG: KEGG entry
- MetaCyc: metabolic pathway
- PRIAM: profile
- PDB structures: RCSB PDB PDBe PDBsum
Search
- PMC: articles
- PubMed: articles
- NCBI: proteins

Tricin synthase (EC 2.1.1.175, ROMT-17, ROMT-15, HvOMT1, ZmOMT1) is an enzyme with systematic name S-adenosyl-L-methionine:tricetin 3',5'-O-dimethyltransferase. This enzyme catalyses the following overall chemical reaction

tricetin
+ 2 SAM
tricin
+ 2 SAH

The enzyme adds two methyl groups, in sequence, to the flavone tricetin. The first goes on one of the ortho positions in the ring which has three phenolic oxygens, followed by the other, to give tricin. The methyl groups come from the cofactor, S-adenosyl methionine (SAM), which becomes S-adenosyl-L-homocysteine (SAH). The enzyme was characterised from Oryza sativa (ROMT-15 and ROMT-17).

== See also ==
- Tricetin 3',4',5'-O-trimethyltransferase, an enzyme from common wheat which converts tricetin sequentially to its tri-ether.
