= 4'-O-glucoside =

4'-O-glucoside may refer to:

- Hydrangenol 4'-O-glucoside, an isocoumarin glucoside
- Okanin 4'-O-glucoside or marein, a chalconoid glucoside
- Quercetin 4'-O-glucoside or spiraeoside, a flavonol glucoside

== See also ==
- O-glucoside
