= Okanin =

- Chemical structure of okanin

Names
- Preferred IUPAC name 2′,3,3′,4,4′-Pentahydroxychalcone
- Other names 3-(3,4-dihydroxyphenyl)-1-(2,3,4-trihydroxyphenyl)prop-2-en-1-one

Identifiers
CAS Number	484-76-4
3D model (JSmol)	Interactive image
ChEBI	CHEBI:7734
ChemSpider	4444680
PubChem CID	5281294
UNII	8R55YLB39F
- InChI: InChI=1S/C15H12O6/c16-10(9-3-6-12(18)15(21)14(9)20)4-1-8-2-5-11(17)13(19)7-8/h1-7,17-21H/b4-1+ Key: GSBNFGRTUCCBTK-DAFODLJHSA-N; InChI=1/C15H12O6/c16-10(9-3-6-12(18)15(21)14(9)20)4-1-8-2-5-11(17)13(19)7-8/h1-7,17-21H/b4-1+ Key: GSBNFGRTUCCBTK-DAFODLJHBD
- SMILES: C1=CC(=C(C=C1C=CC(=O)C2=C(C(=C(C=C2)O)O)O)O)O

Properties
Chemical formula	C_{15}H_{12}O_{6}
Molar mass	288.25 g/mol
- Except where otherwise noted, data are given for materials in their standard state (at 25 °C [77 °F], 100 kPa). verify (what is ?) Infobox references

Okanin is a chalconoid. It can be found in the plant Bidens pilosa (Picao preto).

== Glycosides / Acetylations ==
Marein is the 4'-O-glucoside of okanin.

Methylated okanin derivatives can be isolated from Bidens torta. Those include okanin 3,4,3′,4′-tetramethyl ether, okanin 3,4,3′-trimethyl ether 4′-glucoside, okanin 4-methyl ether 4′-glucoside and okanin 4-methyl ether 4′-glucoside monoacetate. Okanin 3,4-dimethyl ether 4′-glucoside can also be isolated.
