= Maritimein =

Names
- IUPAC name 6-(β-D-Glucopyranosyloxy)-3′,4′,7-trihydroxyaurone
- Systematic IUPAC name (2Z)-2-[(3,4-Dihydroxyphenyl)methylidene]-7-hydroxy-6-{[(2S,3R,4S,5S,6R)-3,4,5-trihydroxy-6-(hydroxymethyl)oxan-2-yl]oxy}-1-benzofuran-3(2H)-one
- Other names Maritimetin-6-O-glucoside; 3′,4′,6,7-Tetrahydroxy-6-O-glucosylaurone; 6-O-β-D-Glucopyranosyl-3′,4′,6,7-tetrahydroxyaurone

Identifiers
CAS Number	490-54-0
3D model (JSmol)	Interactive image
ChemSpider	4952802
ECHA InfoCard	100.007.012
EC Number	207-712-2
PubChem CID	6450184
UNII	4PTU0WDQ7M
CompTox Dashboard (EPA)	DTXSID901029272
- InChI: InChI=1S/C21H20O11/c22-7-14-16(26)18(28)19(29)21(32-14)31-12-4-2-9-15(25)13(30-20(9)17(12)27)6-8-1-3-10(23)11(24)5-8/h1-6,14,16,18-19,21-24,26-29H,7H2/b13-6-/t14-,16-,18+,19-,21-/m1/s1 Key: SYRURBPRFQUYQS-RHEJLWEFSA-N; InChI=1/C21H20O11/c22-7-14-16(26)18(28)19(29)21(32-14)31-12-4-2-9-15(25)13(30-20(9)17(12)27)6-8-1-3-10(23)11(24)5-8/h1-6,14,16,18-19,21-24,26-29H,7H2/b13-6-/t14-,16-,18+,19-,21-/m1/s1 Key: SYRURBPRFQUYQS-RHEJLWEFBR
- SMILES: C1=CC(=C(C=C1/C=C\2/C(=O)C3=C(O2)C(=C(C=C3)O[C@H]4[C@@H]([C@H]([C@@H]([C@H](O4)CO)O)O)O)O)O)O

Properties
Chemical formula	C_{21}H_{20}O_{11}
Molar mass	448.380 g·mol^{−1}
- Except where otherwise noted, data are given for materials in their standard state (at 25 °C [77 °F], 100 kPa). verify (what is ?) Infobox references

Maritimein is an aurone, a type of natural phenol. It is the 6-glucoside of maritimetin. It can be found in Coreopsis maritima. It is an anthochlor pigment, a kind of yellow pigment.
