= Marein =

Names
- IUPAC name 4′-(β-D-Glucopyranosyloxy)-2′,3,3′,4-tetrahydroxychalcone
- Systematic IUPAC name 2′,3,3′,4-Tetrahydroxy-4′-{[(2S,3R,4S,5S,6R)-3,4,5-trihydroxy-6-(hydroxymethyl)oxan-2-yl]oxy}chalcone
- Other names Okanin-4'-O-glucoside

Identifiers
CAS Number	535-96-6 =; 197164-34-4 (non-specific)
3D model (JSmol)	Interactive image
ChEBI	CHEBI:179868
ChEMBL	ChEMBL490510
ChemSpider	4945457
ECHA InfoCard	100.007.841
EC Number	208-623-1
PubChem CID	6441269
UNII	CY787E65J4
CompTox Dashboard (EPA)	DTXSID601029273
- InChI: InChI=1S/C21H22O11/c22-8-15-18(28)19(29)20(30)21(32-15)31-14-6-3-10(16(26)17(14)27)11(23)4-1-9-2-5-12(24)13(25)7-9/h1-7,15,18-22,24-30H,8H2/b4-1+/t15-,18-,19+,20-,21-/m1/s1 Key: XGEYXJDOVMEJNG-HTFDPZBKSA-N
- SMILES: C1=CC(=C(C=C1C=CC(=O)C2=C(C(=C(C=C2)OC3C(C(C(C(O3)CO)O)O)O)O)O)O)O

Properties
Chemical formula	C_{21}H_{22}O_{11}
Molar mass	450.39 g/mol
- Except where otherwise noted, data are given for materials in their standard state (at 25 °C [77 °F], 100 kPa). verify (what is ?) Infobox references

Marein is a chalconoid, a type of natural phenol. It is the 4'-O-glucoside of okanin. It can be found in Coreopsis maritima. It is an anthochlor pigment, a kind of yellow pigment.
