= Flavanone 7-O-glucoside 2"-O-beta-L-rhamnosyltransferase =

Class of enzymes

Identifiers
- EC no.: 2.4.1.236

Databases
- IntEnz: IntEnz view
- BRENDA: BRENDA entry
- ExPASy: NiceZyme view
- KEGG: KEGG entry
- MetaCyc: metabolic pathway
- PRIAM: profile
- PDB structures: RCSB PDB PDBe PDBsum
Search
- PMC: articles
- PubMed: articles
- NCBI: proteins

Flavanone 7-O-glucoside 2"-O-beta-L-rhamnosyltransferase (EC 2.4.1.236) is an enzyme that catalyzes the chemical reaction

prunin
+ UDP-rhamnose
naringin
+ UDP

The two substrates of this enzyme are the flavanone glucoside, prunin, and UDP-rhamnose. Its products are naringin and uridine diphosphate (UDP).

This enzyme belongs to the family of glycosyltransferases, specifically the hexosyltransferases. The systematic name of this enzyme class is UDP-L-rhamnose:flavanone-7-O-glucoside 2''-O-beta-L-rhamnosyltransferase. Other names in common use include UDP-rhamnose:flavanone-7-O-glucoside-2"-O-rhamnosyltransferase, and 1->2 UDP-rhamnosyltransferase. Other flavanone 7-O-glucosides can be substrates, including those from hesperetin or based on the flavones luteolin and apigenin.
