= FOMT =

FOMT may refer to:

- Harvest_Moon:_Friends_of_Mineral_Town, a video game
- Tricetin 3',4',5'-O-trimethyltransferase, an enzyme
