= Isobavachalcone =

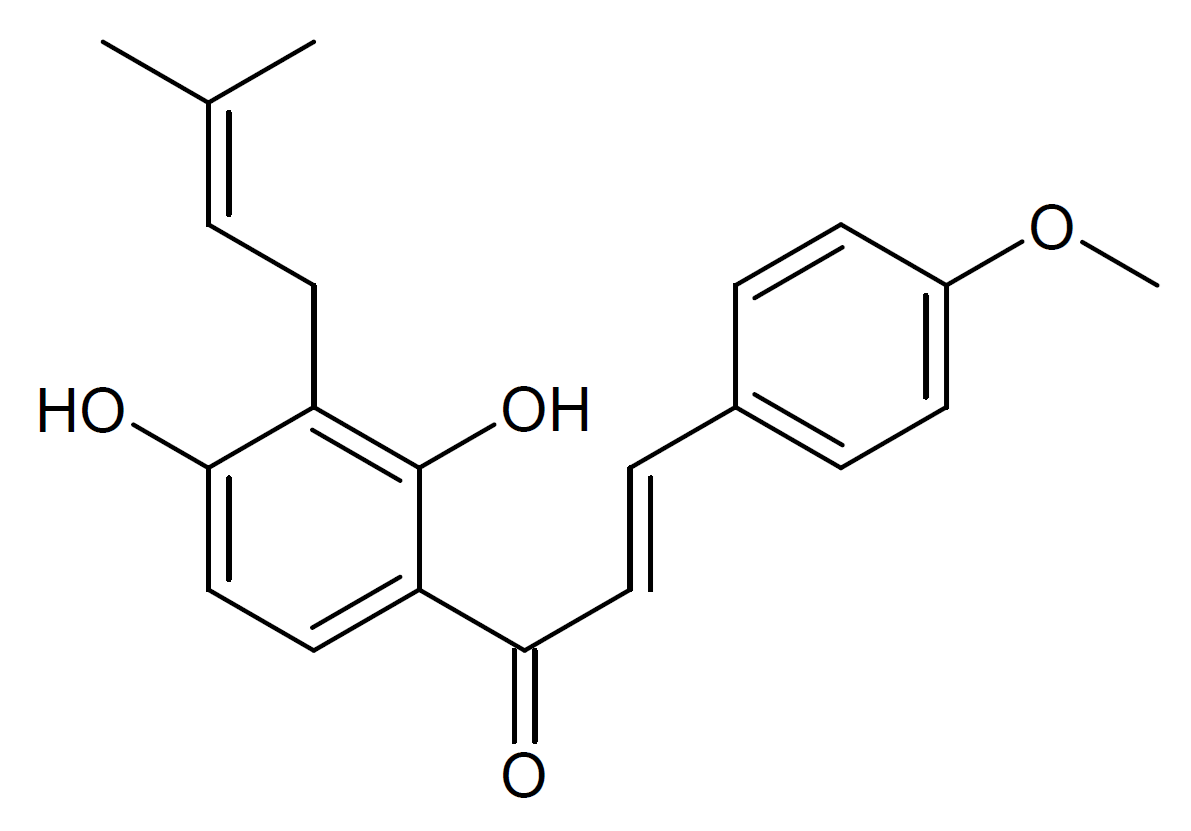

Identifiers
- IUPAC name: (E)-1-[2,4-dihydroxy-3-(3-methylbut-2-enyl)phenyl]-3-(4-hydroxyphenyl)prop-2-en-1-one
- CAS Number: 20784-50-3
- PubChem CID: 5281255
- ChemSpider: 4444667
- UNII: ZWO2SC993A
- KEGG: C08648
- ChEBI: CHEBI:28106
- ChEMBL: ChEMBL253467
- CompTox Dashboard (EPA): DTXSID601317123

Chemical and physical data
- Formula: C_{20}H_{20}O_{4}
- Molar mass: 324.376 g·mol^{−1}
- 3D model (JSmol): Interactive image
- SMILES: CC(=CCC1=C(C=CC(=C1O)C(=O)/C=C/C2=CC=C(C=C2)O)O)C
- InChI: InChI=1S/C20H20O4/c1-13(2)3-9-16-19(23)12-10-17(20(16)24)18(22)11-6-14-4-7-15(21)8-5-14/h3-8,10-12,21,23-24H,9H2,1-2H3/b11-6+; Key:DUWPGRAKHMEPCM-IZZDOVSWSA-N

Isobavachalcone is a natural product from the prenylated chalconoid family.

It can be isolated from numerous medicinal plant species including Psoralea corylifolia, Fructus psoraleae, and Angelica keiskei. It has antiiflammatory, antiviral and anti-cancer properties in vitro and plants containing isobavachalcone are used in Chinese herbal medicine for the treatment of osteoporosis and other aging-related diseases.

== See also ==
- Licoflavone C
- Xanthohumol
