= Flavanone 7-O-beta-glucosyltransferase =

Class of enzymes

Identifiers
- EC no.: 2.4.1.185
- CAS no.: 125752-73-0

Databases
- IntEnz: IntEnz view
- BRENDA: BRENDA entry
- ExPASy: NiceZyme view
- KEGG: KEGG entry
- MetaCyc: metabolic pathway
- PRIAM: profile
- PDB structures: RCSB PDB PDBe PDBsum
- Gene Ontology: AmiGO / QuickGO
Search
- PMC: articles
- PubMed: articles
- NCBI: proteins

Flavanone 7-O-beta-glucosyltransferase (EC 2.4.1.185) is an enzyme that catalyzes the chemical reaction

UDP-glucose + a flavanone $\rightleftharpoons$ UDP + a flavanone 7-O-beta-D-glucoside

The two substrates of this enzyme are UDP-glucose and a flavanone. Its products are UDP and the corresponding flavanone 7-O-beta-D-glucoside.

This enzyme belongs to the family of glycosyltransferases, specifically the hexosyltransferases. The systematic name of this enzyme class is UDP-glucose:flavanone 7-O-beta-D-glucosyltransferase. Other names in common use include uridine diphosphoglucose-flavanone 7-O-glucosyltransferase, naringenin 7-O-glucosyltransferase, and hesperetin 7-O-glucosyl-transferase.

An example of this reaction in flavonoid biosynthesis is the conversion of naringenin to prunin:

naringenin
+ UDP-glucose
prunin
+ UDP

In some citrus fruits, the product prunin is converted to naringin, a compound which is responsible for the bitter taste of grapefruit.
