= Aureusidin synthase =

Class of enzymes

Identifiers
- EC no.: 1.21.3.6
- CAS no.: 320784-48-3

Databases
- IntEnz: IntEnz view
- BRENDA: BRENDA entry
- ExPASy: NiceZyme view
- KEGG: KEGG entry
- MetaCyc: metabolic pathway
- PRIAM: profile
- PDB structures: RCSB PDB PDBe PDBsum
Search
- PMC: articles
- PubMed: articles
- NCBI: proteins

Aureusidin synthase (EC 1.21.3.6, AmAS1) is an enzyme with systematic name 2',4,4',6'-tetrahydroxychalcone 4'-O-beta-D-glucoside:oxygen oxidoreductase.

Aureusidin synthase has two main enzymatic tasks: hydroxylation at the 3-position on the B-ring of chalcones, and the oxidative cyclization of chalcones to form aurones. The chalcones modified are typically glucosylated 2',4,4',6'-tetrahydroxychalcone (THC) and 2',3,4,4',6'-pentahydroxychalcone (PHC). These aurones, particularly auresidin, form pigments for coloration in flowers. These pigments may have been developed to attract and guide bees for pollination, but they also provide protection from viruses, pests and fungus.

== Enzyme structure ==
Aureusidin synthase is a 39 kDa monomeric glycoprotein containing binuclear copper. The addition of phenylthiourea, which competitively binds to binuclear copper, inhibits the enzyme's productivity overall. Because of this, it is likely that the active site contains the binuclear copper.

Aureusidin synthase is homologous to plant polyphenol oxidase (PPO), but contains certain significant modifications. While PPO has a highly conserved N-terminal amino acid sequence in order to facilitate transport to the plastid lumen, aureusidin synthase lacks this sequence and thus is not localized to the plasmid. Much like PPOs, aureusidin synthase is likely first synthesized as a larger ~60 kDa protein and then undergoes proteolytic cleavage to remove transport groups.

== Enzyme mechanism ==
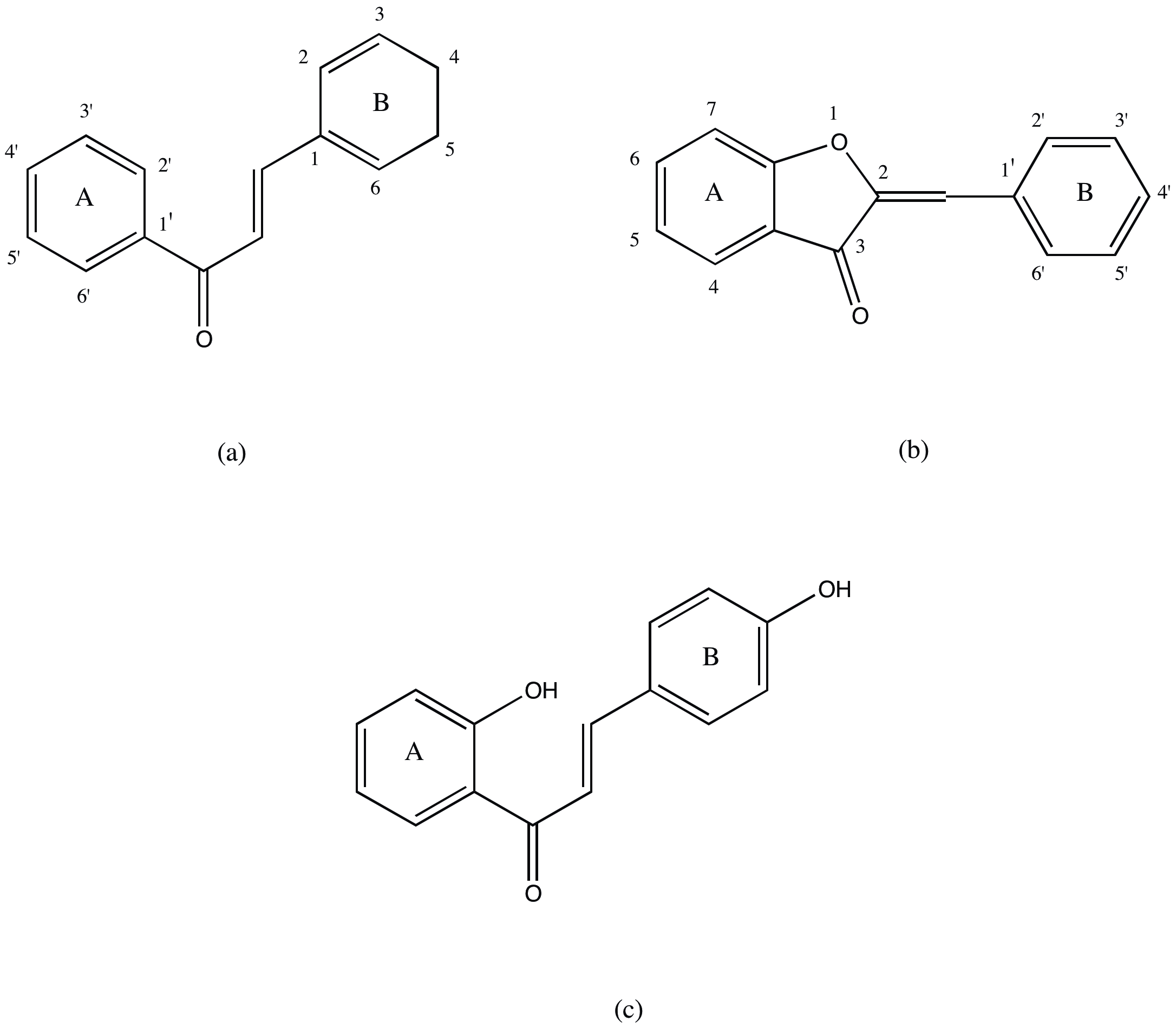
Fig. 1: (a) Generalized form of a chalcone. (b) Generalized form of an aurone. (c) Chalcone with the necessary modifications (2'- and 4-hydroxylation) to be processed by aureusidin synthase.

Aureusidin synthase catalyzes the creation of aurones from chalcones through hydroxylation and oxidative cyclization. This class of reactions includes:

(1) 2',4,4',6'-tetrahydroxychalcone 4'-O-beta-D-glucoside + O_{2} $\rightleftharpoons$ aureusidin 6-O-beta-D-glucoside + H_{2}O
(2) 2',3,4,4',6'-pentahydroxychalcone 4'-O-beta-D-glucoside + 1/2 O_{2} $\rightleftharpoons$ aureusidin 6-O-beta-D-glucoside + H_{2}O
(3) 2',3,4,4',6'-pentahydroxychalcone 4'-O-beta-D-glucoside + O_{2} $\rightleftharpoons$ bracteatin 6-O-beta-D-glucoside + H_{2}O

While the protein is named for the yellow aureusidin pigment it often produces, it may produce a number of similar aurones including sulfuretin, bracteatin, and 3',4',5',6-tetrahydroxyaurone. In order to modify the chalcone to an aurone, the chalcone must undergo an oxidative cyclization to form a five-member heterocycle fused to the a-ring of the aurone. This step may not proceed unless the 3-position on the chalcone's B-ring is oxygenated. From this and the protein's homology with PPO, the current proposed mechanism for aureusidin synthase is shown in Fig. 2. The first step in the process results in a hydroxylation in the 3 position (for THC) and an oxidation to a diketone ring. This mechanism is generally assumed to be the same as that of tyrosinase. This assumption is based on the homology of the two structures and similar functionality. This product then undergoes an oxidative cyclization and then an isomerization to give the final product, but it is possible that these steps take place outside the enzyme. This mechanism can only produce aurones with 3',4'-dihydroxy or 3',4',5'-trihydroxy functionalization, but there have been aurones reported with one or no hydroxyl groups on the B-ring. It is unclear whether this aurone formation is due to an alternative mechanism or another protein.

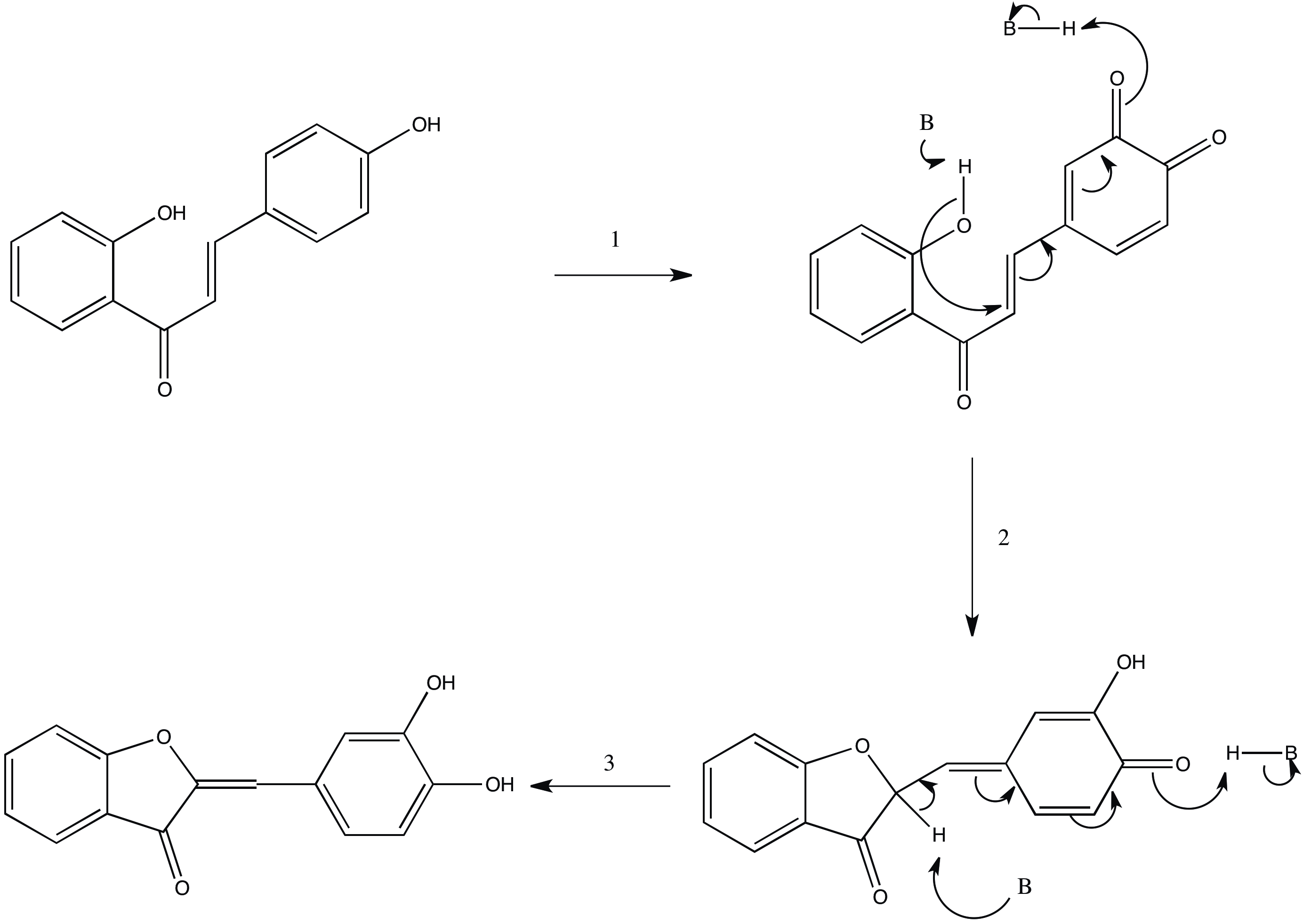
Fig 2: Generalized mechanism of aureusidin synthase. B denotes a base. In step 1, the 3 position is hydroxylated if necessary and both hydroxyl groups on the B-ring are oxidized. The second step is an oxidative cyclization, and step 3 is an isomerization.

== Biological function ==
Aureusidin is a plant flavonoid that provides yellow coloration in several plants, including snapdragons and cosmos. It also provides various protective benefits from disease and parasites. Auresidin synthase is active only in the vacuole, and it is transported directly from the endoplasmic reticulum to the vacuole via Golgi body. In vitro studies have shown that aurone synthesis proceeds much more quickly when the chalcone is first glucosylated, and in vivo studies have shown that yellow coloration is not expressed without the coexpression of the UDP glucuronosyltransferase UGT88D3 to first glucosylate the chalcone. This glucosylation aids in aurone production by metabolically channelling the modified chalcones to the vacuole.

== Industrial relevance ==
The genetic modification of flowering plants to express colors not possible by natural breeding has been one of the main goals of the floricultural industry. Aureusidin synthase has been introduced into plants with naturally blue flowers to form new transgenic yellow flowers in Torenia species. This is accomplished by coexpressing Aureusidin synthase and UDP-glucose:chalcone 4'-O-glucosyltransferase in flowers and using RNA interference to block the expression of natural pigment production.

In addition to its importance to the floricultural industry, aureusidin synthase is a relatively new target for biomedical research. Aurones have been found to have antioxidant, antibacterial, and anticancer effects. Aureusidin synthase is of particular attractiveness in creating genetically modified plants that may confer medicinal properties, and the creation of transgenic lettuce and tobacco leaves with improved antioxidant properties has already been demonstrated.
