= 8-dimethylallylnaringenin 2'-hydroxylase =

Class of enzymes

Identifiers
- EC no.: 1.14.13.103

Databases
- IntEnz: IntEnz view
- BRENDA: BRENDA entry
- ExPASy: NiceZyme view
- KEGG: KEGG entry
- MetaCyc: metabolic pathway
- PRIAM: profile
- PDB structures: RCSB PDB PDBe PDBsum
Search
- PMC: articles
- PubMed: articles
- NCBI: proteins

In enzymology, a 8-dimethylallylnaringenin 2'-hydroxylase (EC 1.14.13.103) is an enzyme that catalyzes the chemical reaction

sophoraflavanone B + NADPH + H^{+} + O_{2} $\rightleftharpoons$ leachianone G + NADP^{+} + H_{2}O

The 4 substrates of this enzyme are sophoraflavanone B, NADPH, H^{+}, and O_{2}, whereas its 3 products are leachianone G, NADP^{+}, and H_{2}O.

This enzyme belongs to the family of oxidoreductases, specifically those acting on paired donors, with O2 as oxidant and incorporation or reduction of oxygen. The oxygen incorporated need not be derived from O2 with NADH or NADPH as one donor, and incorporation of one atom o oxygen into the other donor. The systematic name of this enzyme class is sophoraflavanone-B,NADPH:oxygen oxidoreductase (2'-hydroxylating). This enzyme is also called 8-DMAN 2'-hydroxylase.
