= Tricetin 3',4',5'-O-trimethyltransferase =

Class of enzymes

Identifiers
- EC no.: 2.1.1.169

Databases
- IntEnz: IntEnz view
- BRENDA: BRENDA entry
- ExPASy: NiceZyme view
- KEGG: KEGG entry
- MetaCyc: metabolic pathway
- PRIAM: profile
- PDB structures: RCSB PDB PDBe PDBsum
Search
- PMC: articles
- PubMed: articles
- NCBI: proteins

Tricetin 3',4',5'-O-trimethyltransferase (EC 2.1.1.169, FOMT, TaOMT1, TaCOMT1, TaOMT2) is an enzyme with systematic name S-adenosyl-L-methionine:tricetin 3',4',5'-O-trimethyltransferase. This enzyme catalyses the following overall chemical reaction

tricetin
+ 3 SAM
3',4',5'-O-trimethyltricetin
+ 3 SAH

The enzyme adds three methyl groups, in sequence, to the flavone tricetin. The first goes on one of the ortho positions in the ring which has three phenolic oxygens, followed by the other ortho group (giving tricin) and finally the para one. The methyl groups come from the cofactor, S-adenosyl methionine (SAM), which becomes S-adenosyl-L-homocysteine (SAH). The enzyme was characterised from common wheat.

== See also ==
- Tricin synthase which catalyses the same methylation reactions to tricin but not the third step
