= Aureusidin =

Names
- IUPAC name 3′,4,4′,6-Tetrahydroxyaurone
- Systematic IUPAC name (2Z)-2-[(3,4-Dihydroxyphenyl)methylidene]-4,6-dihydroxy-1-benzofuran-3(2H)-one
- Other names (Z)-2-(3,4-Dihydroxybenzylidene)-4,6-dihydroxybenzofuran-3(2H)-one

Identifiers
CAS Number	38216-54-5 =
3D model (JSmol)	Interactive image
ChEBI	CHEBI:18149
ChEMBL	ChEMBL593229
ChemSpider	4444632
PubChem CID	5281220
UNII	U8B4XHN2DX
CompTox Dashboard (EPA)	DTXSID201028835
- InChI: InChI=1S/C15H10O6/c16-8-5-11(19)14-12(6-8)21-13(15(14)20)4-7-1-2-9(17)10(18)3-7/h1-6,16-19H/b13-4- Key: WBEFUVAYFSOUEA-PQMHYQBVSA-N; InChI=1/C15H10O6/c16-8-5-11(19)14-12(6-8)21-13(15(14)20)4-7-1-2-9(17)10(18)3-7/h1-6,16-19H/b13-4- Key: WBEFUVAYFSOUEA-PQMHYQBVBG
- SMILES: C1=CC(=C(C=C1C=C2C(=O)C3=C(C=C(C=C3O2)O)O)O)O

Properties
Chemical formula	C_{15}H_{10}O_{6}
Molar mass	286.239 g·mol^{−1}
- Except where otherwise noted, data are given for materials in their standard state (at 25 °C [77 °F], 100 kPa). verify (what is ?) Infobox references

Aureusidin is an aurone.

== Metabolism ==
Aureusidin synthase is an enzyme found in Antirrhinum majus (Garden snapdragon).
