= Naringenin 8-dimethylallyltransferase =

Class of enzymes

Identifiers
- EC no.: 2.5.1.70

Databases
- IntEnz: IntEnz view
- BRENDA: BRENDA entry
- ExPASy: NiceZyme view
- KEGG: KEGG entry
- MetaCyc: metabolic pathway
- PRIAM: profile
- PDB structures: RCSB PDB PDBe PDBsum
Search
- PMC: articles
- PubMed: articles
- NCBI: proteins

Naringenin 8-dimethylallyltransferase (EC 2.5.1.70) is an enzyme characterised from Sophora flavescens that catalyzes a chemical reaction that converts naringenin to its 8-prenyl derivative by adding the 5-carbon unit from dimethylallyl pyrophosphate. This gives 8-prenylnaringenin (also called sophoraflavanone B), with pyrophosphate (PP_{i}) as a byproduct:

Dimethylallyl pyrophosphate
+
Naringenin
PP_{i}
8-Prenylnaringenin

Sophoraflavanone G

This enzyme is a transferase, specifically those transferring aryl or alkyl groups other than methyl groups. The systematic name of this enzyme class is dimethylallyl-diphosphate:naringenin 8-dimethylallyltransferase. It is also called N8DT and is part of the biosynthesis pathway to sophoraflavanone G.
