= Tricetin =

Names
- IUPAC name 3′,4′,5,5′,7-Pentahydroxyflavone
- Systematic IUPAC name 5,7-Dihydroxy-2-(3,4,5-trihydroxyphenyl)-4H-1-benzopyran-4-one

Identifiers
CAS Number	520-31-0
3D model (JSmol)	Interactive image
ChemSpider	4445018
ECHA InfoCard	100.237.320
PubChem CID	5281701
UNII	5627PY99ZO
CompTox Dashboard (EPA)	DTXSID60199964
- InChI: InChI=1S/C15H10O7/c16-7-3-8(17)14-9(18)5-12(22-13(14)4-7)6-1-10(19)15(21)11(20)2-6/h1-5,16-17,19-21H Key: ARSRJFRKVXALTF-UHFFFAOYSA-N
- SMILES: C1=C(C=C(C(=C1O)O)O)C2=CC(=O)C3=C(C=C(C=C3O2)O)O

Properties
Chemical formula	C_{15}H_{10}O_{7}
Molar mass	302.23 g/mol
- Except where otherwise noted, data are given for materials in their standard state (at 25 °C [77 °F], 100 kPa). Infobox references

Tricetin is a flavone, a type of flavonoid. It is a rare aglycone found in the pollen of members of the Myrtaceae, subfamily Leptospermoideae, such as Eucalyptus globulus. This compound shows anticancer effects on human breast adenocarcinoma MCF-7 cells. Moreover. a potent anti-inflammatory effect of tricetin has also been demonstrated in a model of acute pancreatitis. This observation was explained by the compound's radical scavenging effects, its inhibitory effect on the DNA damage sensor enzyme poly (ADP-ribose) polymerase-1 (PARP1) and PARP1-mediated cell death and suppression of inflammatory gene expression.

== See also ==
- Tricin synthase produces tricin or tricetin 3′,5′-dimethyl ether
- Tricetin 3′,4′,5′-O-trimethyltransferase
