= Licoflavone C =

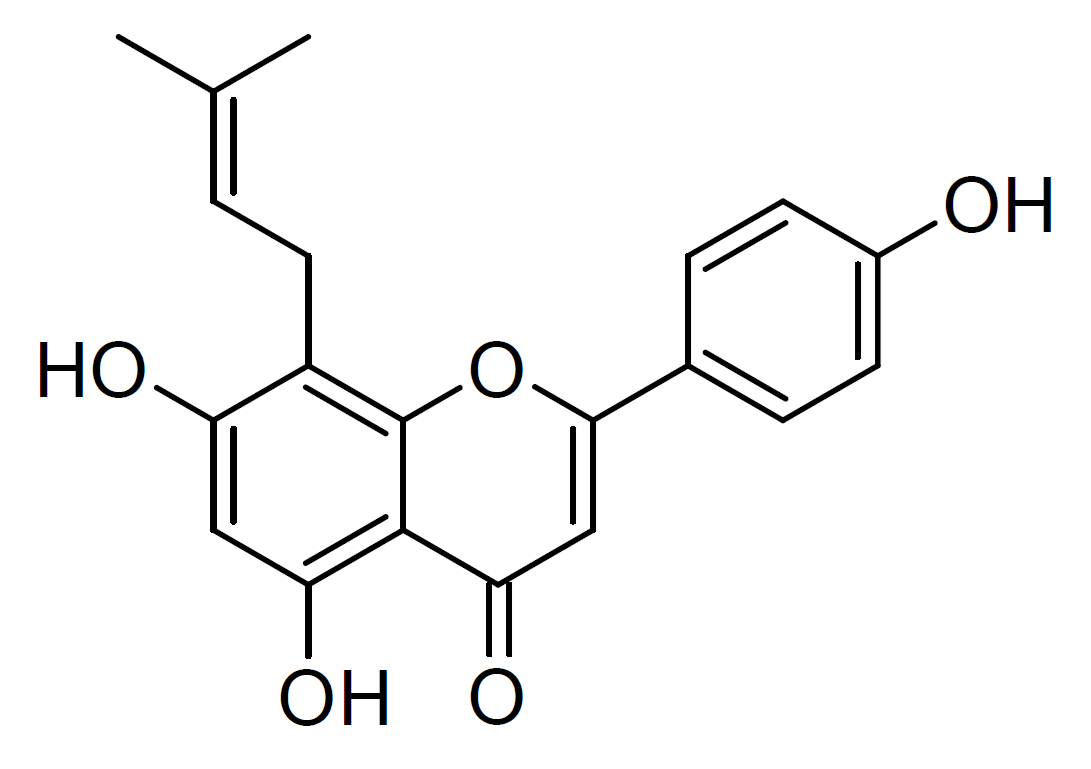

Identifiers
- IUPAC name: 5,7-dihydroxy-2-(4-hydroxyphenyl)-8-(3-methylbut-2-enyl)chromen-4-one
- CAS Number: 72357-31-4
- PubChem CID: 10246505
- ChemSpider: 8421992
- UNII: 0DQ85982ZY
- ChEMBL: ChEMBL371562
- CompTox Dashboard (EPA): DTXSID90904164

Chemical and physical data
- Formula: C_{20}H_{18}O_{5}
- Molar mass: 338.359 g·mol^{−1}
- 3D model (JSmol): Interactive image
- SMILES: CC(=CCC1=C2C(=C(C=C1O)O)C(=O)C=C(O2)C3=CC=C(C=C3)O)C
- InChI: InChI=1S/C20H18O5/c1-11(2)3-8-14-15(22)9-16(23)19-17(24)10-18(25-20(14)19)12-4-6-13(21)7-5-12/h3-7,9-10,21-23H,8H2,1-2H3; Key:MEHHCBRCXIDGKZ-UHFFFAOYSA-N

Licoflavone C is a natural product isolated from numerous plant species including Glycyrrhiza inflata, Morus alba, and Artocarpus communis. It has antiiflammatory, antiviral and anti-cancer properties in vitro and is of interest in herbal medicine.

== See also ==
- 8-Prenylnaringenin
- Apigenin
- Isobavachalcone
- Isoxanthohumol
- Sophoraflavanone G
