= Leptosidin =

Names
- IUPAC name 3′,4′,6-Trihydroxy-7-methoxyaurone
- Systematic IUPAC name (2Z)-2-[(3,4-Dihydroxyphenyl)methylidene]-6-hydroxy-7-methoxy-1-benzofuran-3(2H)-one

Identifiers
| CAS Number | 486-24-8 |
| 3D model (JSmol) | Interactive image |
| ChemSpider | 4444669 |
| KEGG | C08651 |
| PubChem CID | 5281257 |
| UNII | VE67J9PR82 |
| CompTox Dashboard (EPA) | DTXSID501028834 |
- InChI: InChI=1S/C16H12O6/c1-21-16-11(18)5-3-9-14(20)13(22-15(9)16)7-8-2-4-10(17)12(19)6-8/h2-7,17-19H,1H3/b13-7- Key: PFRGTMTYWMVLMU-QPEQYQDCSA-N; InChI=1/C16H12O6/c1-21-16-11(18)5-3-9-14(20)13(22-15(9)16)7-8-2-4-10(17)12(19)6-8/h2-7,17-19H,1H3/b13-7- Key: PFRGTMTYWMVLMU-QPEQYQDCBV
- SMILES: COc(c(O)3)c(o1)c(cc3)c(=O)c(=Cc(c2)cc(O)c(O)c2)1

Properties
| Chemical formula | C_{16}H_{12}O_{6} |
| Molar mass | 300.266 g·mol^{−1} |
- Except where otherwise noted, data are given for materials in their standard state (at 25 °C [77 °F], 100 kPa). verify (what is ?) Infobox references

Leptosidin was the first aurone to be isolated in Coreopsis grandiflora by Geissman T.A. and Heaton C.D. in 1943. Leptosidin blocks the active residues of PRKACA.
