= Isoxanthohumol =

Names
- IUPAC name 7-hydroxy-2-(4-hydroxyphenyl)-5-methoxy-8-(3-methylbut-2-enyl)-2,3-dihydrochromen-4-one

Identifiers
CAS Number	70872-29-6
3D model (JSmol)	Interactive image
ChEMBL	ChEMBL492828
ChemSpider	8104156
KEGG	C22606
PubChem CID	513197
UNII	X4YHZ98N7Q
- InChI: InChI=1S/C21H22O5/c1-12(2)4-9-15-16(23)10-19(25-3)20-17(24)11-18(26-21(15)20)13-5-7-14(22)8-6-13/h4-8,10,18,22-23H,9,11H2,1-3H3/t18-/m0/s1 Key: YKGCBLWILMDSAV-SFHVURJKSA-N; InChI=1/C21H22O5/c1-12(2)4-9-15-16(23)10-19(25-3)20-17(24)11-18(26-21(15)20)13-5-7-14(22)8-6-13/h4-8,10,18,22-23H,9,11H2,1-3H3/t18-/m0/s1 Key: YKGCBLWILMDSAV-SFHVURJKBQ
- SMILES: O=C2c3c(O[C@H](c1ccc(O)cc1)C2)c(c(O)cc3OC)C\C=C(/C)C

Properties
Chemical formula	C_{21}H_{22}O_{5}
Molar mass	354.402 g·mol^{−1}
- Except where otherwise noted, data are given for materials in their standard state (at 25 °C [77 °F], 100 kPa). Infobox references

Isoxanthohumol is a prenylflavonoid, and it is a phytoestrogen. It is abbreviated as IX or IXN.

8-Prenylnaringenin can be produced from isoxanthohumol by flora in the human intestine, and by fungi in cell cultures.

This prenylflavonoid is found in hops and beer. It has limited estrogenic activity. At the concentration found in beer, it is unlikely to have an estrogenic effect in breast tissue.

Derivatives of isoxanthohumol are: 7,4′-Di-O-methylisoxanthohumol; 7-O-methylisoxanthohumol; 7-O-n-pentylisoxanthohumol; 7,4′-di-O-n-pentyl-8-isoxanthohumol; 7,4′-Di-O-allylisoxanthohumol; 7,4′-Di-O-acetylisoxanthohumol; and 7,4′-Di-O-palmitoylisoxanthohumol.

== See also ==
- Licoflavone C
- Xanthohumol, the corresponding prenylated chalcone
