= Naringin =

- Naringin

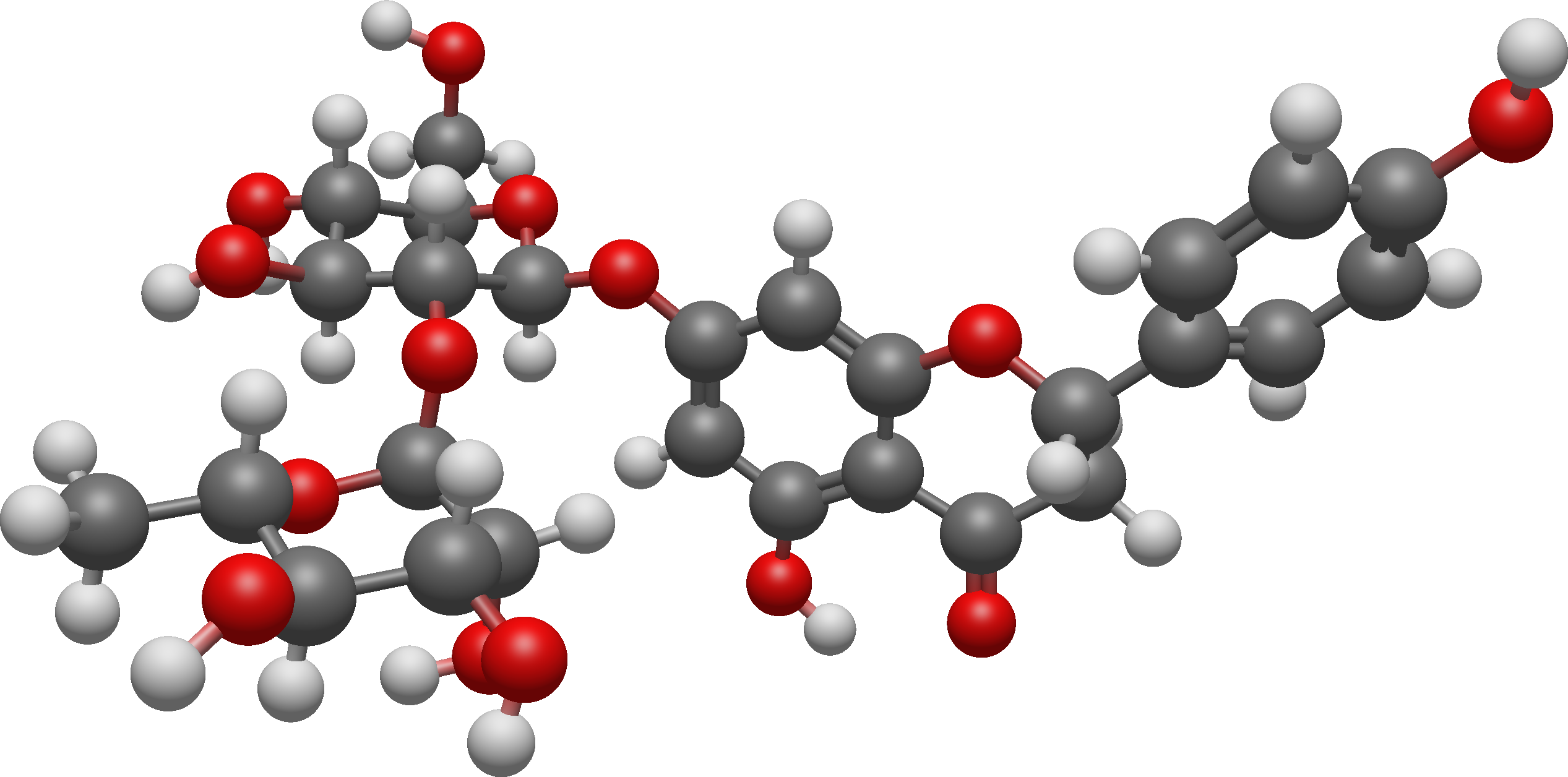
- Naringin 3D

Names
- IUPAC name (2S)-4′,5-Dihydroxy-7-[α-L-rhamnopyranosyl-(1→2)-β-D-glucopyranosyloxy]flavan-4-one
- Systematic IUPAC name (2S)-7-{[(2S,3R,4S,5S,6R)-4,5-Dihydroxy-6-(hydroxymethyl)-3-{[(2S,3R,4R,5R,6S)-3,4,5-trihydroxy-6-methyloxan-2-yl]oxy}oxan-2-yl]oxy}-5-hydroxy-2-(4-hydroxyphenyl)-2,3-dihydro-4H-1-benzopyran-4-one
- Other names Naringin; Naringoside; 4′,5,7-Trihydroxyflavanone-7-rhamnoglucoside; Naringenin 7-O-neohesperidoside

Identifiers
CAS Number	10236-47-2
3D model (JSmol)	Interactive image
ChEBI	CHEBI:28819
ChEMBL	ChEMBL451512
ChemSpider	4447695
ECHA InfoCard	100.030.502
IUPHAR/BPS	4738
KEGG	C09789
PubChem CID	442428
UNII	N7TD9J649B
CompTox Dashboard (EPA)	DTXSID6022478
- InChI: InChI=1S/C27H32O14/c1-10-20(32)22(34)24(36)26(37-10)41-25-23(35)21(33)18(9-28)40-27(25)38-13-6-14(30)19-15(31)8-16(39-17(19)7-13)11-2-4-12(29)5-3-11/h2-7,10,16,18,20-30,32-36H,8-9H2,1H3/t10-,16+,18-,20+,21-,22+,23+,24-,25-,26-,27-/m1/s1 Key: DFPMSGMNTNDNHN-CSIAVLANSA-N; InChI=1/C27H32O14/c1-10-20(32)22(34)24(36)26(37-10)41-25-23(35)21(33)18(9-28)40-27(25)38-13-6-14(30)19-15(31)8-16(39-17(19)7-13)11-2-4-12(29)5-3-11/h2-7,10,16,18,20-30,32-36H,8-9H2,1H3/t10-,16+,18-,20+,21-,22+,23+,24-,25-,26-,27-/m1/s1 Key: DFPMSGMNTNDNHN-CSIAVLANBN
- SMILES: O=C4c5c(O)cc(O[C@@H]2O[C@H](CO)[C@@H](O)[C@H](O)[C@H]2O[C@H]1O[C@@H]([C@H](O)[C@H](O)[C@H]1O)C)cc5O[C@H](c3ccc(O)cc3)C4

Properties
Chemical formula	C_{27}H_{32}O_{14}
Molar mass	580.54 g/mol
Melting point	166 °C (331 °F; 439 K)
- Except where otherwise noted, data are given for materials in their standard state (at 25 °C [77 °F], 100 kPa). verify (what is ?) Infobox references

Naringin is a flavanone-7-O-glycoside between the flavanone naringenin and the disaccharide neohesperidose. The flavonoid naringin occurs naturally in citrus fruits, especially in grapefruit, where naringin is responsible for the fruit's bitter taste. In commercial grapefruit juice production, the enzyme naringinase can be used to remove the bitterness (debittering) created by naringin. In humans naringin is metabolized to the aglycone naringenin (not bitter) by naringinase present in the gut.

== Structure ==
Naringin belongs to the flavonoid family which are characterised by the presence of 15 carbon atoms in three rings: two benzene rings are connected by a three-carbon chain. Naringin contains the basic flavonoid structure along with one rhamnose and one glucose unit attached to the phenol, naringenin. The steric hindrance provided by the two sugar units makes naringin less potent as an antioxidant than this aglycone.

== Biosynthesis ==
Flavonoid biosynthesis in plants uses a phenylpropanoid metabolic pathway in which the amino acid phenylalanine is converted to 4-coumaroyl-CoA. This is combined with three units of malonyl-CoA to yield a group of compounds called chalcones, which contain two phenyl rings. In the main pathway, the enzymes chalcone synthase and chalcone isomerase produce (S)-naringenin.

naringenin
prunin
naringin

Sugar units are incorporated by transferase enzymes that use UDP-glucose (giving prunin) followed by UDP-rhamnose to yield naringin.

== Metabolism ==
In humans, naringinase is found in the liver and rapidly metabolizes naringin back to its biosynthetic precursor naringenin. This happens in two steps: first, naringin is hydrolyzed by α-L-rhamnosidase activity of naringinase to rhamnose and prunin. The prunin formed is then hydrolyzed by β-D-glucosidase activity of naringinase into naringenin and glucose. Naringinase is an enzyme that has a wide occurrence in nature and can be found in plants, yeasts, and fungi. It is commercially attractive due to its debittering properties.

== Toxicity ==
The typical concentration of naringin in grapefruit juice is around 400 mg/L. The reported LD50 of naringin in rodents in 2000 mg/kg.

Naringin inhibits some drug-metabolizing cytochrome P450 enzymes, including CYP3A4 and CYP1A2, which may result in drug-drug interactions. Ingestion of naringin and related flavonoids can also affect the intestinal absorption of certain drugs, leading to either an increase or decrease in circulating drug levels. To avoid interference with drug absorption and metabolism, the consumption of citrus (especially grapefruit) and other juices with medications is advised against.

However, in vitro studies have also shown that naringin in grapefruit is not what causes the inhibitory effects associated with grapefruit juice. Naringin solution when compared to grapefruit solution produced much less inhibition of CYP3A4. Furthermore, bitter orange juice, which contains considerably less naringin content than grapefruit juice, was found to produce the same level of inhibition of CYP3A4 as grapefruit juice. This would suggest that an inhibitor other than naringin, such as furanocoumarin, which is also found in Seville oranges, may be at work. At the same time, naringenin is known to be a more potent inhibitor of CYP3A4/5 than naringin and in vitro studies have been unable to effectively convert naringin into naringenin. This leaves open the possibility that in vivo, naringin converted into naringenin by naringinase is what causes the inhibitory effect on CYP3A4. Due to the contradictory results of the effect of naringin it is hard to tell whether it is naringin itself or other components of grapefruit juice that cause drug-drug interaction and lead to its toxicity.

== Uses ==
=== Commercial ===
When naringin is treated with potassium hydroxide or another strong base, and then catalytically hydrogenated, it becomes a naringin dihydrochalcone, a compound roughly 300–1800 times sweeter than sugar at threshold concentrations.
