= Plant secondary metabolism =

Non-essential metabolic compounds and processes within plants

In biochemistry, plant secondary metabolism produces a large number of specialized compounds (estimated 200,000) that do not aid in the growth and development of plants but are required for the plant to survive in its environment. Secondary metabolism is connected to primary metabolism by using building blocks and biosynthetic enzymes derived from primary metabolism. Primary metabolism governs all basic physiological processes that allow a plant to grow and set seeds, by translating the genetic code into proteins, carbohydrates, and amino acids. Specialized compounds from secondary metabolism are essential for communicating with other organisms in mutualistic (e.g. attraction of beneficial organisms such as pollinators) or antagonistic interactions (e.g. deterrent against herbivores and pathogens). They further assist in coping with abiotic stress such as increased UV-radiation. The broad functional spectrum of specialized metabolism is still not fully understood. In any case, a good balance between products of primary and secondary metabolism is best for a plant’s optimal growth and development as well as for its effective coping with often changing environmental conditions.

Well known specialized compounds include alkaloids, polyphenols including flavonoids, and terpenoids. Humans use many of these compounds for culinary, medicinal and nutraceutical purposes.

== History ==
Research into secondary plant metabolism primarily took off in the later half of the 19th century, however, there was still much confusion over what the exact function and usefulness of these compounds were. All that was known was that secondary plant metabolites were "by-products" of the primary metabolism and were not crucial to the plant's survival. Early research only succeeded as far as categorizing the secondary plant metabolites but did not give real insight into the actual function of the secondary plant metabolites. The study of plant metabolites is thought to have started in the early 1800s when Friedrich Willhelm Serturner isolated morphine from opium poppy, and after that new discoveries were made rapidly. In the early half of the 1900s, the main research around secondary plant metabolism was dedicated to the formation of secondary metabolites in plants, and this research was compounded by the use of tracer techniques which made deducing metabolic pathways much easier. However, there was still not much research being conducted into the functions of secondary plant metabolites until around the 1980s. Before then, secondary plant metabolites were thought of as simply waste products.

In the 1970s, however, new research showed that secondary plant metabolites play an indispensable role in the survival of the plant in its environment. One of the most ground breaking ideas of this time argued that plant secondary metabolites evolved in relation to environmental conditions, and this indicated the high gene plasticity of secondary metabolites, but this theory was ignored for about half a century before gaining acceptance. Recently, the research around secondary plant metabolites is focused around the gene level and the genetic diversity of plant metabolites. Biologists are now trying to trace back genes to their origin and re-construct evolutionary pathways.

== Primary vs. secondary plant metabolism ==
Primary metabolism in a plant comprises all metabolic pathways that are essential to the plant's survival. Primary metabolites are compounds that are directly involved in the growth and development of a plant whereas secondary metabolites are compounds produced in other metabolic pathways that, although important, are not essential to the functioning of the plant. However, secondary plant metabolites are useful in the long term, often for defense purposes, and give plants characteristics such as color. Secondary plant metabolites are also used in signalling and regulation of primary metabolic pathways. Plant hormones, which are secondary metabolites, are often used to regulate the metabolic activity within cells and oversee the overall development of the plant. As mentioned above in the History tab, secondary plant metabolites help the plant maintain an intricate balance with the environment, often adapting to match the environmental needs. Plant metabolites that color the plant are a good example of this, as the coloring of a plant can attract pollinators and also defend against attack by animals.

== Secondary metabolites ==
There is no fixed, commonly agreed upon system for classifying secondary metabolites. Based on their biosynthetic origins, plant secondary metabolites can be divided into three major groups:

1. Flavonoids and allied phenolic and polyphenolic compounds,
2. Terpenoids, and
3. Nitrogen-containing alkaloids and sulphur-containing compounds.

Other researchers have classified secondary metabolites into following, more specific types

Class	Type	Number of known metabolites	Examples
Alkaloids	Nitrogen-containing	21000	Cocaine, psilocin, caffeine, nicotine, morphine, berberine, vincristine, reserpine, galantamine, atropine, vincamine, quinidine, ephedrine, quinine
Non-protein amino acids (NPAAs)	Nitrogen-containing	700	NPAAs are produced by specific plant families such as Leguminosae, Cucurbitaceae, Sapindaceae, Aceraceae and Hippocastanaceae. Examples: Azatyrosine, Canavanine
Amines	Nitrogen-containing	100	
Cyanogenic glycosides	Nitrogen-containing	60	Amygdalin, dhurrin, linamarin, lotaustralin, prunasin
Glucosinolates	Nitrogen-containing	100	
Alkamides	Nitrogen-containing	150	
Lectins, peptides and polypeptides	Nitrogen-containing	2000	Concanavalin A
Terpenes	Without nitrogen	>15,000	Azadirachtin, artemisinin, tetrahydrocannabinol
Steroids and saponins	Without nitrogen	NA	These are terpenoids with a particular ring structure. Cycloartenol
Flavonoids and tannins	Without nitrogen	5000	Luteolin, tannic acid
Phenylpropanoids, lignins, coumarins and lignans	Without nitrogen	2000	Resveratrol
Polyacetylenes, fatty acids and waxes	Without nitrogen	1500	
Polyketides	Without nitrogen	750	
Carbohydrates and organic acids	Without nitrogen	200	

Some of the secondary metabolites are discussed below:

=== Atropine ===
Atropine is a tropane alkaloid. Alkaloids contain nitrogens, frequently in a ring structure, and are derived from amino acids. Tropane is an organic compound containing nitrogen and it is from tropane that atropine is derived. Atropine is synthesized by a reaction between tropine and tropate, catalyzed by atropinase. Both of the substrates involved in this reaction are derived from amino acids, tropine from pyridine (through several steps) and tropate directly from phenylalanine. Within Atropa belladonna atropine synthesis has been found to take place primarily in the root of the plant. The concentration of synthetic sites within the plant is indicative of the nature of secondary metabolites. Typically, secondary metabolites are not necessary for normal functioning of cells within the organism meaning the synthetic sites are not required throughout the organism. As atropine is not a primary metabolite, it does not interact specifically with any part of the organism, allowing it to travel throughout the plant.

=== Flavonoids ===
Flavonoids are also known as Vitamin P or citrin. These metabolites are mostly used in plants to produce yellow and other pigments which play a big role in coloring the plants. In addition, Flavonoids are readily ingested by humans and they seem to display important anti-inflammatory, anti-allergic and anti-cancer activities. Flavonoids are also found to be powerful anti-oxidants and researchers are looking into their ability to prevent cancer and cardiovascular diseases. Flavonoids help prevent cancer by inducing certain mechanisms that may help to kill cancer cells, and researches believe that when the body processes extra flavonoid compounds, it triggers specific enzymes that fight carcinogens. Good dietary sources of Flavonoids are all citrus fruits, which contain the specific flavanoids hesperidins, quercitrin, and rutin, berries, tea, dark chocolate and red wine and many of the health benefits attributed to these foods come from the Flavonoids they contain. Flavonoids are synthesized by the phenylpropanoid metabolic pathway where the amino acid phenylalanine is used to produce 4-coumaryol-CoA, and this is then combined with malonyl-CoA to produce chalcones which are backbones of Flavonoids Chalcones are aromatic ketones with two phenyl rings that are important in many biological compounds. The closure of chalcones causes the formation of the flavonoid structure. Flavonoids are also closely related to flavones which are actually a sub class of flavonoids, and are the yellow pigments in plants. In addition to flavones, 11 other subclasses of Flavonoids including, isoflavones, flavans, flavanones, flavanols, flavanolols, anthocyanidins, catechins (including proanthocyanidins), leukoanthocyanidins, dihydrochalcones, and aurones.

=== Cyanogenic glycoside ===
To get a better understanding of how secondary metabolites play a big role in plant defense mechanisms we can focus on the recognizable defense-related secondary metabolites, cyanogenic glycosides. The compounds of these secondary metabolites (As seen in Figure 1) are found in over 2000 plant species. Its structure allows the release of cyanide, a poison produced by certain bacteria, fungi, and algae that is found in numerous plants. Animals and humans possess the ability to detoxify cyanide from their systems naturally. Therefore, cyanogenic glycosides can be used for positive benefits in animal systems always. For example, the larvae of the southern armyworm consumes plants that contain this certain metabolite and have shown a better growth rate with this metabolite in their diet, as opposed to other secondary metabolite-containing plants. Although this example shows cyanogenic glycosides being beneficial to the larvae many still argue that this metabolite can do harm. To help in determining whether cyanogenic glycosides are harmful or helpful researchers look closer at its biosynthetic pathway (Figure 2). Past research suggests that cyanogenic glucosides stored in the seed of the plant are metabolized during germination to release nitrogen for seedling to grow. With this, it can be inferred that cyanogenic glycosides play various roles in plant metabolism. Though subject to change with future research, there is no evidence showing that cyanogenic glycosides are responsible for infections in plants.

=== Phytic acid ===
Phytic acid is the main method of phosphorus storage in plant seeds, but is not readily absorbed by many animals (only absorbed by ruminants). Not only is phytic acid a phosphorus storage unit, but it also is a source of energy and cations, a natural antioxidant for plants, and can be a source of myoinositol which is one of the preliminary pieces for cell walls.

Phytic acid is also known to bond with many different minerals, and by doing so prevents those minerals from being absorbed; making phytic acid an anti-nutrient. There is a lot of concern with phytic acids in nuts and seeds because of its anti-nutrient characteristics. In preparing foods with high phytic acid concentrations, it is recommended they be soaked in after being ground to increase the surface area. Soaking allows the seed to undergo germination which increases the availability of vitamins and nutrient, while reducing phytic acid and protease inhibitors, ultimately increasing the nutritional value. Cooking can also reduce the amount of phytic acid in food but soaking is much more effective.

Phytic acid is an antioxidant found in plant cells that most likely serves the purpose of preservation. This preservation is removed when soaked, reducing the phytic acid and allowing the germination and growth of the seed. When added to foods it can help prevent discoloration by inhibiting lipid peroxidation. There is also some belief that the chelating of phytic acid may have potential use in the treatment of cancer.

=== Gossypol ===
Gossypol is a yellow pigment and is found in cotton plants. It occurs mainly in the root and/or seeds of species of cotton. Gossypol can have various chemical structures. It can exist in three forms: gossypol, gossypol acetic acid, and gossypol formic acid. All of these forms have very similar biological properties. Gossypol is a type of aldehyde, meaning that it has a formyl group. The formation of gossypol occurs through an isoprenoid pathway. Isoprenoid pathways are common among secondary metabolites. Gossypol's main function in the cotton plant is to act as an enzyme inhibitor. An example of gossypol's enzyme inhibition is its ability to inhibit nicotinamide adenine dinucleotide-linked enzymes of Trypanosoma cruzi. Trypanosoma cruzi is a parasite which causes Chaga's disease.

For some time it was believed that gossypol was merely a waste product produced during the processing of cottonseed products. Extensive studies have shown that gossypol has other functions. Many of the more popular studies on gossypol discuss how it can act as a male contraceptive. Gossypol has also been linked to causing hypokalemic paralysis. Hypokalemic paralysis is a disease characterized by muscle weakness or paralysis with a matching fall in potassium levels in the blood. Hypokalemic paralysis associated with gossypol in-take usually occurs in March, when vegetables are in short supply, and in September, when people are sweating a lot. This side effect of gossypol in-take is very rare however. Gossypol induced hypokalemic paralysis is easily treatable with potassium repletion.

=== Phytoestrogens ===
Plants synthesize certain compounds not naturally produced by humans but which can play vital roles in human health. One such group of metabolites is phytoestrogens, found in nuts, oilseeds, soy, and other foods. Phytoestrogens are chemicals which act like the hormone estrogen. Estrogen is important for women's bone and heart health, but high amounts of it has been linked to breast cancer. In the plant, the phytoestrogens are involved in the defense system against fungi. Phytoestrogens can do two different things in a human body. At low doses it mimics estrogen, but at high doses it actually blocks the body's natural estrogen. The estrogen receptors in the body which are stimulated by estrogen will acknowledge the phytoestrogen, thus the body may reduce its own production of the hormone. This has a negative result, because there are various abilities of the phytoestrogen which estrogen does not do. Its effects the communication pathways between cells and has effects on other parts of the body where estrogen normally does not play a role.

=== Carotenoids ===
Carotenoids are organic pigments found in the chloroplasts and chromoplasts of plants. They are also found in some organisms such as algae, fungi, some bacteria, and certain species of aphids. There are over 600 known carotenoids. They are split into two classes, xanthophylls and carotenes. Xanthophylls are carotenoids with molecules containing oxygen, such as lutein and zeaxanthin. Carotenes are carotenoids with molecules that are unoxygenated, such as α-carotene, β-carotene and lycopene. In plants, carotenoids can occur in roots, stems, leaves, flowers, and fruits. Carotenoids have two important functions in plants. First, they can contribute to photosynthesis. They do this by transferring some of the light energy they absorb to chlorophylls, which then uses this energy for photosynthesis. Second, they can protect plants which are over-exposed to sunlight. They do this by harmlessly dissipating excess light energy which they absorb as heat. In the absence of carotenoids, this excess light energy could destroy proteins, membranes, and other molecules. Some plant physiologists believe that carotenoids may have an additional function as regulators of certain developmental responses in plants. Tetraterpenes are synthesized from DOXP precursors in plants and some bacteria. Carotenoids involved in photosynthesis are formed in chloroplasts; Others are formed in plastids. Carotenoids formed in fungi are presumably formed from mevalonic acid precursors. Carotenoids are formed by a head-to-head condensation of geranylgeranyl pyrophosphate or diphosphate (GGPP) and there is no NADPH requirement.
