= Naringenin =

Main polyphenol in grapefruit

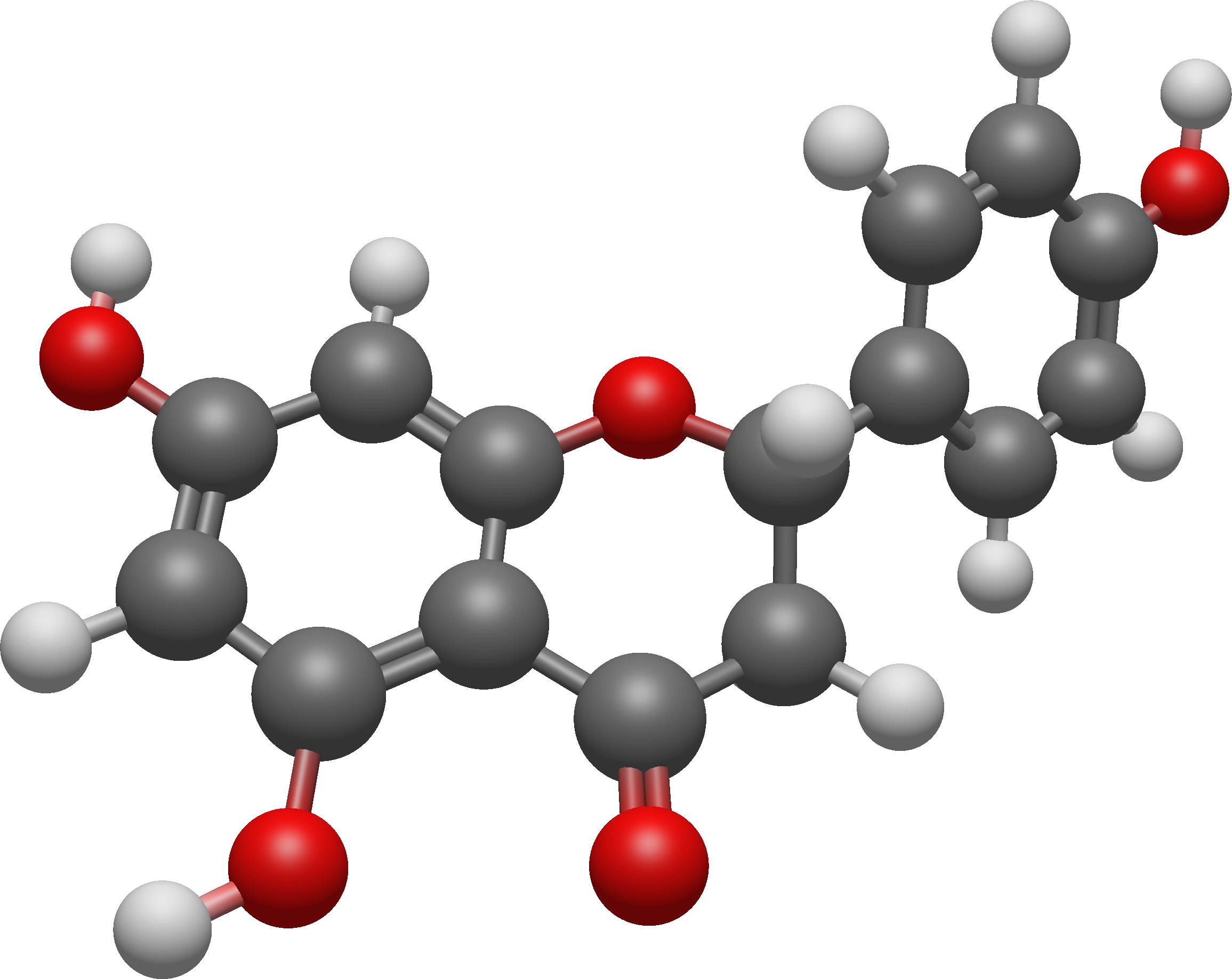

Names
- IUPAC name (2S)-4′,5,7-Trihydroxyflavan-4-one
- Systematic IUPAC name (2S)-5,7-Dihydroxy-2-(4-hydroxyphenyl)-2,3-dihydro-4H-1-benzopyran-4-one
- Other names Naringetol; Salipurol; Salipurpol

Identifiers
CAS Number	480-41-1
3D model (JSmol)	Interactive image
ChEBI	CHEBI:50202
ChEMBL	ChEMBL9352
ChemSpider	388383
DrugBank	DB03467
ECHA InfoCard	100.006.865
KEGG	C00509
PubChem CID	439246
UNII	HN5425SBF2
CompTox Dashboard (EPA)	DTXSID1022392
- InChI: InChI=1S/C15H12O5/c16-9-3-1-8(2-4-9)13-7-12(19)15-11(18)5-10(17)6-14(15)20-13/h1-6,13,16-18H,7H2/t13-/m0/s1 Key: FTVWIRXFELQLPI-ZDUSSCGKSA-N
- SMILES: O=C2c3c(O[C@H](c1ccc(O)cc1)C2)cc(O)cc3O

Properties
Chemical formula	C_{15}H_{12}O_{5}
Molar mass	272.256 g·mol^{−1}
Melting point	251 °C (484 °F; 524 K)
Solubility in water	475 mg/L
- Except where otherwise noted, data are given for materials in their standard state (at 25 °C [77 °F], 100 kPa). Infobox references

Naringenin is a flavanone from the flavonoid group of polyphenols. It is commonly found in citrus fruits, especially as the predominant flavonone in grapefruit.

The fate and biological functions of naringenin in vivo are unknown, remaining under preliminary research, as of 2024. High consumption of dietary naringenin is generally regarded as safe, mainly due to its low bioavailability. Taking dietary supplements or consuming grapefruit excessively may impair the action of anticoagulants and increase the toxicity of various prescription drugs.

Similar to furanocoumarins present in citrus fruits, naringenin may evoke CYP3A4 suppression in the liver and intestines, possibly resulting in adverse interactions with common medications.

== Structure ==
Naringenin has the skeleton structure of a flavanone with three hydroxy groups at the 4′, 5, and 7 carbons. It may be found both in the aglycol form, naringenin, or in its glycosidic form, naringin, which has the addition of the disaccharide neohesperidose attached via a glycosidic linkage at carbon 7.

Like the majority of flavanones, naringenin has a single chiral center at carbon 2, although the optical purity is variable. Racemization of (S)-(−)-naringenin has been shown to occur fairly quickly.

== Sources and bioavailability ==
Naringenin and its glycoside has been found in a variety of herbs and fruits, including grapefruit, oranges, and lemons, sour orange, sour cherries, tomatoes, cocoa, Greek oregano, water mint, as well as in beans. Ratios of naringenin to naringin vary among sources, as do enantiomeric ratios.

The naringenin-7-glucoside form seems less bioavailable than the aglycol form.

Grapefruit juice can provide much higher plasma concentrations of naringenin than orange juice.

Naringenin can be absorbed from cooked tomato paste. There are 3.8 mg of naringenin in 150 grams of tomato paste.

== Biosynthesis and metabolism ==
Flavonoid biosynthesis in plants uses a phenylpropanoid metabolic pathway in which the amino acid phenylalanine is converted to 4-coumaroyl-CoA. This is combined with malonyl-CoA to yield a group of compounds called chalcones, which contain two phenyl rings. In the case of naringenin, the precursor is naringenin chalcone produced by the enzyme chalcone synthase. This can cyclise spontaneously but would provide racemic material. The enzyme chalcone isomerase constrains the reaction to give only the (S) isomer of the flavanone.

naringenin chalcone
naringenin

The enzyme naringenin 8-dimethylallyltransferase uses dimethylallyl diphosphate and (2S)-naringenin to produce diphosphate and 8-prenylnaringenin. Cunninghamella elegans, a fungal model organism of the mammalian metabolism, can be used to study the naringenin sulfation.

In plants, the biosynthetic pathway to anthocyanins continues when the enzyme flavanone 3-dioxygenase inserts a hydroxyl group into the dihydropyran ring:

naringenin
+ α-ketoglutaric acid
O_{2}
CO_{2}
aromadendrin
+ succinic acid

This alpha-ketoglutarate-dependent hydroxylase requires α-ketoglutaric acid, which is converted to succinic acid as a by-product. Aromadendrin is a precursor to many other derivatives.

In some citrus fruits, naringenin is converted to prunin, the precursor to naringin, a compound which is responsible for the bitter taste of grapefruit.

naringenin
+ UDP-glucose
prunin
+ UDP

Enzymes with this activity include flavanone 7-O-beta-glucosyltransferase, which uses UDP-glucose to transfer the sugar component.

Flavanones like naringenin can undergo a rearrangement reaction which converts them first to the unstable hydroxlated isoflavanone, which loses water to give an isoflavone. The enzymes involved are isoflavonoid synthase and 2-hydroxyisoflavanone dehydratase.

naringenin
Synthase
2,4',5,7-tetrahydroxyisoflavanone
Dehydratase
H_{2}O
genistein

== Metabolic fate after dietary intake ==
Naringenin can be produced from dietary naringin by the hydrolytic action of the liver enzyme naringinase. The fate and biological roles of naringenin are difficult to study because naringenin is rapidly metabolized in the intestine and liver, and its metabolites are destined for excretion. The biological activities of naringenin metabolites are unknown, and likely to be different in structure and function from those of the parent compound.
