= Chalcone =

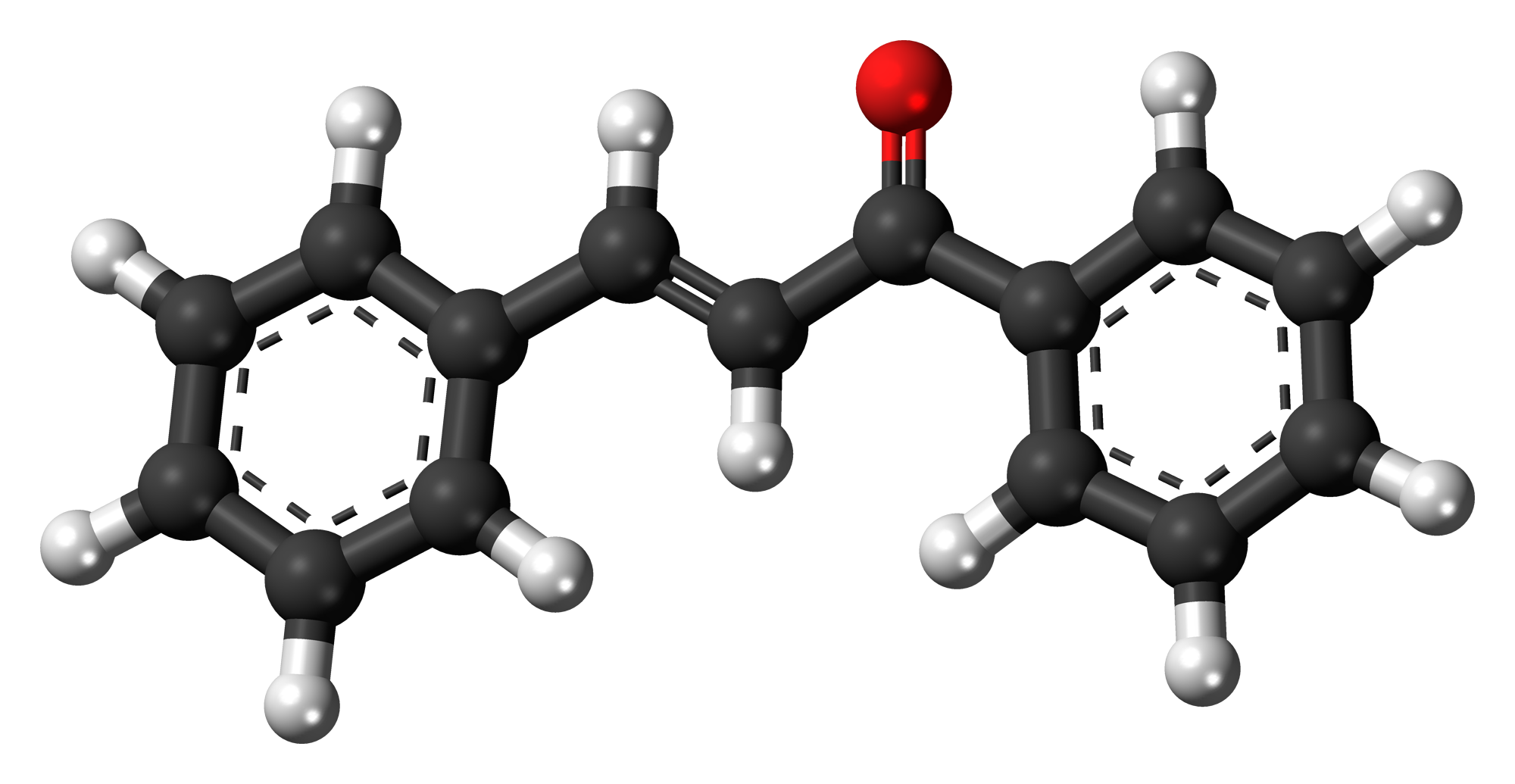

Names
- Preferred IUPAC name Chalcone
- Systematic IUPAC name (2E)-1,3-Diphenylprop-2-en-1-one
- Other names Chalkone; Benzylideneacetophenone; Phenyl styryl ketone benzalacetophenone β-phenylacrylophenone γ-oxo-α,γ-diphenyl-α-propylene α-phenyl-β-benzoylethylene.

Identifiers
CAS Number	94-41-7; 614-47-1 ((E)-Chalcone)
3D model (JSmol)	Interactive image
ChEBI	CHEBI:27618
ChemSpider	6921
ECHA InfoCard	100.002.119
PubChem CID	637760
UNII	5S5A2Q39HX
CompTox Dashboard (EPA)	DTXSID20873536
- InChI: InChI=1S/C15H12O/c16-15(14-9-5-2-6-10-14)12-11-13-7-3-1-4-8-13/h1-12H Key: DQFBYFPFKXHELB-UHFFFAOYSA-N; InChI=1/C15H12O/c16-15(14-9-5-2-6-10-14)12-11-13-7-3-1-4-8-13/h1-12H Key: DQFBYFPFKXHELB-UHFFFAOYAP
- SMILES: O=C(C=Cc1ccccc1)c2ccccc2

Properties
Chemical formula	C_{15}H_{12}O
Molar mass	208.260 g·mol^{−1}
Appearance	pale yellow solid
Density	1.071 g/cm^{3}
Melting point	55 to 57 °C (131 to 135 °F; 328 to 330 K)
Boiling point	345 to 348 °C (653 to 658 °F; 618 to 621 K)
Magnetic susceptibility (χ)	−125.7·10^{−6} cm^{3}/mol
- Except where otherwise noted, data are given for materials in their standard state (at 25 °C [77 °F], 100 kPa). verify (what is ?) Infobox references

Chalcone is the organic compound C_{6}H_{5}C(O)CH=CHC_{6}H_{5}. It is an α,β-unsaturated ketone. A variety of important biological compounds are known collectively as chalcones or chalconoids. They are widely known bioactive substances, fluorescent materials, and chemical intermediates.

== Chemical properties ==
Chalcones have two absorption maxima at 280 nm and 340 nm.

== Biosynthesis ==
Chalcones and chalconoids are synthesized in plants as secondary metabolites. The enzyme chalcone synthase, a type III polyketide synthase, is responsible for the biosynthesis of these compounds. The enzyme is found in all "higher" (vascular) and several "lower" (non-vascular) plants.

== Laboratory synthesis ==
Chalcone is usually prepared by an aldol condensation between benzaldehyde and acetophenone.

This reaction, which can be carried out without any solvent, is so reliable that it is often given as an example of green chemistry in undergraduate education.

== Potential pharmacology ==
Chalcones and their derivatives demonstrate a wide range of biological activities including anti-inflammation. Some 2′-amino chalcones have been studied as potential antitumor agents. Chalcones are of interest in medicinal chemistry and have been described as a privileged scaffold.

== Uses ==
=== Medicinal uses ===
In medicinal chemistry, chalcones have been used as:

- antioxidants
- anticancer agents
- antidiabetic drugs
- antiviral drugs
- antimalarial drugs

=== Industrial uses ===
In chemical industries, they are employed as:

- liquid crystals
- fluorescent chemical scaffolds
- metal sensors
- corrosion inhibitors
- plant hormones

=== Uses in organic chemistry ===
Chalcones have been used as intermediates in heterocyclic synthesis, especially in the synthesis of pyrazoles and aurones.

In the Johnson–Corey–Chaykovsky reaction, chalcone reacts with dimethylsulfoxonium methylide to give 1-phenyl-2-benzoylcyclopropane [15295-43-9] [1145-91-1] in 95% yield. A Leuckart reaction or ammonium acetate in the presence of sodium cyanoborohydride would be predicted to give Phenyl(2-phenylcyclopropyl)methanamine [1559116-96-9]. Alternatively if a reductive amination of the ketone with methylamine is performed one would instead get the secondary amine N-Me [1559367-56-4].

Corey's tranylcypromine

These compounds have the same trans-stereochemistry as was observed for tranylcypromine although their exact mode of pharmacology is still lacking. Lastly, it was discovered that if a hydrazine is prepared from the ketone (ala pheniprazine) one gets a compound that is called [Phenyl-(2-phenylcyclopropyl)methyl]hydrazine (PC105199424).

== See also ==
- Juliá–Colonna epoxidation
