= Naringenin chalcone =

Names
- Preferred IUPAC name 2′,4,4′,6′-Tetrahydroxychalcone
- Other names Chalconaringenin; Chalcononaringenin; Isosalipurpol

Identifiers
CAS Number	25515-46-2; 73692-50-9 (non-specific)
3D model (JSmol)	Interactive image
ChEBI	CHEBI:15413
ChemSpider	4444447
KEGG	C06561
PubChem CID	5280960
UNII	YCF6Z24AS2
CompTox Dashboard (EPA)	DTXSID101043553
- InChI: InChI=1S/C15H12O5/c16-10-4-1-9(2-5-10)3-6-12(18)15-13(19)7-11(17)8-14(15)20/h1-8,16-17,19-20H/b6-3+ Key: YQHMWTPYORBCMF-ZZXKWVIFSA-N
- SMILES: C1=CC(=CC=C1/C=C/C(=O)C2=C(C=C(C=C2O)O)O)O

Properties
Chemical formula	C_{15}H_{12}O_{5}
Molar mass	272.256 g·mol^{−1}
- Except where otherwise noted, data are given for materials in their standard state (at 25 °C [77 °F], 100 kPa). Infobox references

Naringenin chalcone is a common chalconoid (or chalcone, not to be confused with the compound chalcone). It is synthesized from 4-coumaroyl-CoA and malonyl-CoA by chalcone synthase (CHS), a key enzyme in the phenylpropanoid pathway. Naringenin chalcone can spontaneously cyclize to naringenin (a flavanone). In plant cells, this process is catalyzed by chalcone isomerase.

== Biosynthesis and metabolism ==
Flavonoid biosynthesis in plants uses a phenylpropanoid metabolic pathway in which the amino acid phenylalanine is converted to 4-coumaroyl-CoA. This is combined with three units of malonyl-CoA to yield a group of compounds called chalconoids, which contain two phenyl rings. Naringenin chalcone is produced directly in this pathway by the enzyme chalcone synthase.

It can cyclise spontaneously to naringenin but would provide racemic material. The enzyme chalcone isomerase constrains the reaction to give only the (S) isomer of the flavanone.

naringenin chalcone
naringenin

Naringenin is then further transformed into naringin and other plant metabolites including anthocyanins.
