= 8-Prenylnaringenin =

Names
- IUPAC name (2S)-4′,5,7-Trihydroxy-8-(3-methylbut-2-en-1-yl)flavan-4-one
- Systematic IUPAC name (2S)-5,7-Dihydroxy-2-(4-hydroxyphenyl)-8-(3-methylbut-2-en-1-yl)-2,3-dihydro-4H-1-benzopyran-4-one
- Other names Hopein; Flavaprenin; Sophoraflavanone B

Identifiers
CAS Number	53846-50-7
3D model (JSmol)	Interactive image
ChEBI	CHEBI:50207
ChemSpider	421848
KEGG	C18023
PubChem CID	480764
UNII	5L872SZR8X
CompTox Dashboard (EPA)	DTXSID60333083
- InChI: InChI=1S/C20H20O5/c1-11(2)3-8-14-15(22)9-16(23)19-17(24)10-18(25-20(14)19)12-4-6-13(21)7-5-12/h3-7,9,18,21-23H,8,10H2,1-2H3/t18-/m0/s1 Key: LPEPZZAVFJPLNZ-SFHVURJKSA-N; InChI=1/C20H20O5/c1-11(2)3-8-14-15(22)9-16(23)19-17(24)10-18(25-20(14)19)12-4-6-13(21)7-5-12/h3-7,9,18,21-23H,8,10H2,1-2H3/t18-/m0/s1 Key: LPEPZZAVFJPLNZ-SFHVURJKBX
- SMILES: CC(=CCC1=C2C(=C(C=C1O)O)C(=O)C[C@H](O2)C3=CC=C(C=C3)O)C

Properties
Chemical formula	C_{20}H_{20}O_{5}
Molar mass	340.375 g·mol^{−1}
- Except where otherwise noted, data are given for materials in their standard state (at 25 °C [77 °F], 100 kPa). Infobox references

8-Prenylnaringenin (8-PN; also known as flavaprenin, (S)-8-dimethylallylnaringenin, hopein, or sophoraflavanone B) is a prenylflavonoid phytoestrogen. It is reported to be the most estrogenic phytoestrogen known. The compound is equipotent at the two forms of estrogen receptors, ERα and ERβ, and it acts as a full agonist of ERα. Its effects are similar to those of estradiol, but it is considerably less potent in comparison.

8-PN is found in hops (Humulus lupulus) and in beer, and is responsible for the estrogenic effects of the former. It can be produced from isoxanthohumol in fungal cells cultures, and by flora in the human intestine.

== Properties ==
=== Estrogenic ===
8-PN was shown to preserve bone density and has been demonstrated to reduce hot flashes. 8-PN also induces the secretion of prolactin, and increases other estrogenic responses. The compound binds to and activates ERα more times than it does to ERβ.

This prenylflavanoid has drawn interest in the study of hormone replacement therapy, and it is comparable to some selective estrogen-receptor modulators.

In an in vivo study, 8-PN has activated proliferation of mammary cells. At the concentration found in beer, it is unlikely to have an estrogenic effect in breast tissue. Similar to other estrogens, 8-PN induces the expression of the progesterone receptor in various tissues.

Luteinizing hormone (LH) and follicle stimulating hormone (FSH) are suppressed by 8-PN, indicating that it possesses antigonadotropic properties. 8-PN adversely affects male sperm. The role 8-PN plays in fertility requires further research.

=== Other ===
In an in vitro study, 8-PN and synthetic derivatives demonstrated anticancer properties. More recently, a radioligand binding study showed enhancements in GABA_{A} receptor activity by 8-PN

Prenylflavonoids from hops, including 8-PN, are ingredients in some breast enlargement supplements, though there is no evidence of its effectiveness for this purpose.

== Chemistry ==
The enzyme naringenin 8-dimethylallyltransferase uses dimethylallyl diphosphate and (−)-(2S)-naringenin to produce diphosphate and sophoraflavanone B (8-prenylnaringenin).

The enzyme 8-dimethylallylnaringenin 2'-hydroxylase uses sophoraflavanone B (8-prenylnaringenin), NADPH, H^{+} and O_{2} to produce leachianone G, NADP^{+} and H_{2}O.

Synthesized derivatives of 8-PN are: 7,4′-di-O-methyl-8-prenylnaringenin; 7-O-pentyl-8-prenylnaringenin; 7,4′-Di-O-allyl-8-prenylnaringenin; 7,4′-Di-O-acetyl-8-prenylnaringenin; and 7,4′-Di-O-palmitoyl-8-prenylnaringenin.

8-Neopentylnaringenin and 8-n-heptylnaringenin are synthetic derivatives of 8-PN.

== Etymology ==
There is another compound, 8-isopentenylnaringenin, also known as sophoraflavanone B, from Sophora flavescens, that could properly be called 8-prenylnaringenin by scientific naming convention.

== See also ==
- Isoxanthohumol
- Licoflavone C
