= Aurone =

- Aurone Z configuration

Names
- Preferred IUPAC name 2-Benzylidene-1-benzofuran-3(2H)-one
- Other names 2-Benzylidenebenzofuran-3(2H)-one; 2-Benzylidene-1-benzofuran-3-one

Identifiers
CAS Number	582-04-7; 75318-34-2 (E); 37542-14-6 (Z)
3D model (JSmol)	Interactive image
ChemSpider	533325
PubChem CID	613552
UNII	P3PDY72JP9
CompTox Dashboard (EPA)	DTXSID70424870
- InChI: InChI=1S/C15H10O2/c16-15-12-8-4-5-9-13(12)17-14(15)10-11-6-2-1-3-7-11/h1-10H Key: OMUOMODZGKSORV-UHFFFAOYSA-N; InChI=1/C15H10O2/c16-15-12-8-4-5-9-13(12)17-14(15)10-11-6-2-1-3-7-11/h1-10H Key: OMUOMODZGKSORV-UHFFFAOYAF
- SMILES: C1=CC=C(C=C1)C=C2C(=O)C3=CC=CC=C3O2

Properties
Chemical formula	C_{15}H_{10}O_{2}
Molar mass	222.243 g·mol^{−1}
- Except where otherwise noted, data are given for materials in their standard state (at 25 °C [77 °F], 100 kPa). verify (what is ?) Infobox references

An aurone is a heterocyclic chemical compound, which is a type of flavonoid. There are two isomers of the molecule, with (E)- and (Z)-configurations. The molecule contains a benzofuran element associated with a benzylidene linked in position 2. In aurone, a chalcone-like group is closed into a 5-membered ring instead of the 6-membered ring more typical of flavonoids.

== Aurone derivatives ==
Skeletal structure of an (Z)-aurone with numbering scheme used for nomenclature of derivatives

Aurone forms the core for a family of derivatives which are known collectively as aurones. Aurones are plant flavonoids that provide yellow color to the flowers of some popular ornamental plants, such as snapdragon and cosmos. Aurones including 4'-chloro-2-hydroxyaurone (C_{15}H_{11}O_{3}Cl) and 4'-chloroaurone (C_{15}H_{9}O_{2}Cl) can also be found in the brown alga Spatoglossum variabile.

Most aurones are in a (Z)-configuration, which is the more stable configuration according to Austin Model 1 computation. But there are also some in the (E)-configurations such as (E)-3'-O-β-d-glucopyranosyl-4,5,6,4'-tetrahydroxy-7,2'-dimethoxyaurone, found in Gomphrena agrestis.

== Biosynthesis ==
Aurones are biosynthesized starting from coumaryl-CoA. Aureusidin synthase catalyzes the creation of aurones from chalcones through hydroxylation and oxidative cyclization.

== Applications ==
Some aurone derivatives possess antifungal properties and analogy with flavonoids suggests that aurones could have other biological properties.

== Related compound examples ==
- Aureusidin
- Hispidol (6,4'-dihydroxyaurone)
- Leptosidin
- Sulfuretin (6,3',4'-trihydroxyaurone)
- 4,5,6-Trihydroxyaurone
