= Chalcone isomerase =

Enzyme responsible for some flavanones

Identifiers
- EC no.: 5.5.1.6
- CAS no.: 9073-57-8

Databases
- BRENDA: enzyme data
- ExPASy: NiceZyme view
- KEGG: enzyme entry
- MetaCyc: metabolic pathway
- Rhea: reactions
- PDB structures: RCSB PDB PDBe PDBsum
- Gene Ontology: AmiGO / QuickGO
Search
- PMC: articles
- PubMed: articles
- NCBI: proteins

Chalcone isomerase
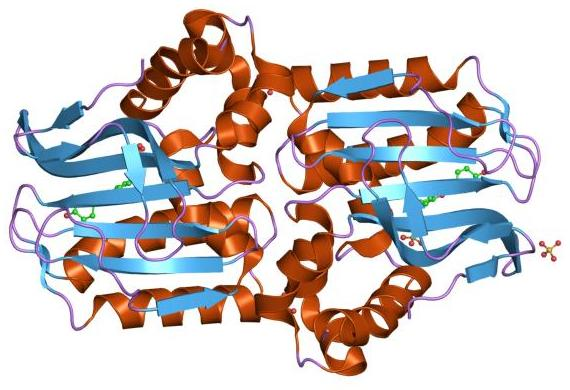
- chalcone isomerase complexed with 4'-hydroxyflavanone

Identifiers
- Symbol: Chalcone
- Pfam: PF02431
- InterPro: IPR003466
- SCOP2: 1eyp / SCOPe / SUPFAM
Available protein structures:
- PDB: IPR003466 PF02431 (ECOD; PDBsum)
- AlphaFold: IPR003466; PF02431

Chalcone isomerase (EC 5.5.1.6) is an enzyme that catalyzes the general chemical reaction

a chalcone $\rightleftharpoons$ a flavanone

In the biosynthesis of anthocyanins in plants, an important example of this reaction converts the chalcone produced by chalcone synthase to naringenin:

naringenin chalcone
naringenin

This reaction can occur spontaneously but provides racemic material. The enzyme constrains the reaction to give only the (S) isomer of the flavanone.

This enzyme belongs to the family of isomerases, specifically the class of intramolecular lyases. The systematic name of this enzyme class is flavanone lyase (decyclizing). This enzyme is also called chalcone-flavanone isomerase. This enzyme participates in flavonoid biosynthesis.

The Petunia hybrida (Petunia) genome contains two genes coding for very similar enzymes, ChiA and ChiB, but only the first seems to encode a functional chalcone isomerase.

== Structural studies ==
As of late 2007, 7 structures have been solved for this class of enzymes, with PDB accession codes PDB: 1EYP, PDB: 1EYQ, PDB: 1FM7, PDB: 1FM8, PDB: 1JEP, PDB: 1JX0, and PDB: 1JX1.

Chalcone isomerase has a core 2-layer alpha/beta structure consisting of beta(3)-alpha(2)-beta-alpha(2)-beta(3).
