= Chalcone synthase =

Class of enzymes

Chalcone and stilbene synthases, C-terminal domain

Identifiers
- Symbol: Chal_sti_synt_C
- Pfam: PF02797
- Pfam clan: CL0046
- InterPro: IPR012328
Available protein structures:
- PDB: IPR012328 PF02797 (ECOD; PDBsum)
- AlphaFold: IPR012328; PF02797

Chalcone Synthase (Naringenin Chalcone Synthase)
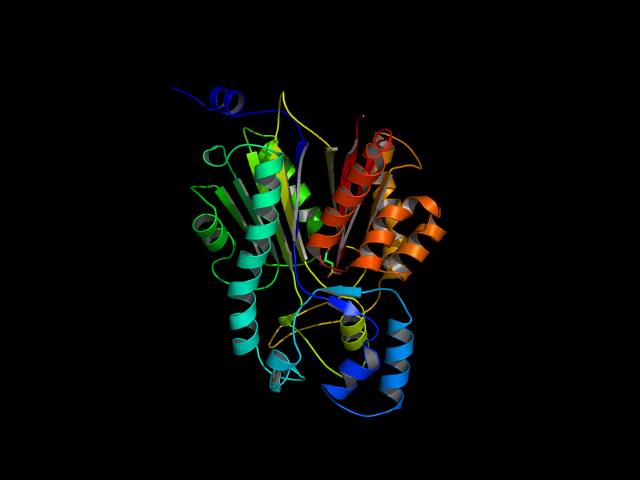
- The structure of CHS from Medicago sativa.

Identifiers
- EC no.: 2.3.1.74
- CAS no.: 56803-04-4

Databases
- IntEnz: IntEnz view
- BRENDA: BRENDA entry
- ExPASy: NiceZyme view
- KEGG: KEGG entry
- MetaCyc: metabolic pathway
- PRIAM: profile
- PDB structures: RCSB PDB PDBe PDBsum
- Gene Ontology: AmiGO / QuickGO
Search
- PMC: articles
- PubMed: articles
- NCBI: proteins

Chalcone synthase or naringenin-chalcone synthase (CHS) is an enzyme ubiquitous to higher plants and belongs to a family of polyketide synthase enzymes (PKS) known as type III PKS. Type III PKSs are associated with the production of chalcones, a class of organic compounds found mainly in plants as natural defense mechanisms and as synthetic intermediates. CHS was the first type III PKS to be discovered. It is the first committed enzyme in flavonoid biosynthesis. The enzyme catalyzes the conversion of 4-coumaroyl-CoA and malonyl-CoA to naringenin chalcone.

== Function ==
CHS catalysis serves as the initial step for flavonoid biosynthesis. Flavonoids are important plant secondary metabolites that serve various functions in higher plants. These include pigmentation, UV protection, fertility, antifungal defense and the recruitment of nitrogen-fixing bacteria. CHS is believed to act as a central hub for the enzymes involved in the flavonoid pathway. Studies have shown that these enzymes interact via protein-protein interactions. Through FLIM FRET, it was shown that CHS interacts with chalcone isomerase (CHI), a consecutive step enzyme, as well as other non-consecutive step enzymes flavanone 3-hydroxylase (F3H), dihydroflavonol 4-reductase (DFR), and flavonol synthase I.

Naringenin-chalcone synthase uses malonyl-CoA and 4-coumaroyl-CoA to produce CoA, naringenin chalcone, and CO_{2}.

== Reaction ==
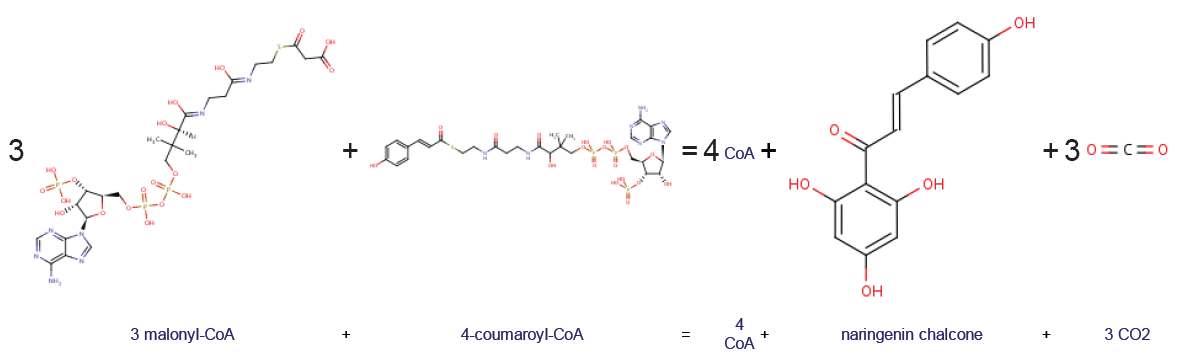
Reaction Stoichiometry, Chalcone Synthase

4-coumaroyl-CoA and three units of malonyl-CoA are converted into three molecules of carbon dioxide, four molecules of coenzyme A and one unit of naringenin chalcone.

== Structure ==
=== Subunits ===
CHS exists as a homodimeric protein with each monomer approximately 42-45 kDa in size. Each monomer possesses a β-keto synthase (KS) activity that catalyzes the sequential head to tail incorporation of two-carbon acetate units into a growing polyketide chain. CHS contains a five layer αβαβα core, a location of the active site and dimerization interface that is highly similar to thiolase-fold containing enzymes. The dimerization interface contains both hydrophobic and hydrophilic residues and is generally flat except for a pair of N-terminal helices that lay entwined across the top. Although the helices are not involved in reaction, they may contain intracellular localization signals as in yeast thiolase. They may also undergo a conformational change to participate in the formation of transient multi-protein complexes with other enzymes in the various pathways diverging from the general phenylpropanoid biosynthetic pathway.

=== Localization ===
The enzyme is localized in the cytosol, associating with the endoplasmic reticulum membrane. In another study, it was shown that CHS and CHI co-localize at the nucleus as well.

=== Active site ===
There are two distinct bi-lobed active site cavities located at the bottom edge of each monomer’s αβαβα core. Identical six-residue loops, which meet at the dimer interface, separate the two active sites from each other. The loops being with Thr132 in the active site and ends with a cis-peptide bond to Pro138. A Met137 residue plugs a hole in the other monomer’s active site. Therefore, the active site is buried except for a 16 Å CoA-binding tunnel that connects the catalytic surface to the outer surrounding milieu. The width of the tunnel is too narrow for the aromatic substrates and products that must pass through it, implying that there must be some dynamic mobility within and around the tunnel when placed in solution.

The active site contains a conserved catalytic triad of Cys164, His303 and Asn336. These residues aid in multiple decarboxylation and condensation reactions, with Cys164 acting as the active site nucleophile. Phe215 and Phe265 are two other important amino acids that act as “gatekeepers” to block the lower protein of the opening between the CoA-binding tunnel and the active site cavity. This limits the access of water to the active site while accommodating substrates and intermediates of varying shapes and sizes. Phe215 also orients the substrates at the active site during elongation of the polyketide intermediate.

== Mechanism ==
The first step involves a transfer of a coumaroyl moiety from a 4-coumaroyl-CoA starter molecule to Cys164. Next, a series of condensation reactions of three acetate units from malonyl-CoA occurs, each proceeding through an acetyl-CoA carbanion derived from malonyl-CoA decarboxylation. This extends the polyketide intermediate. After the generation of a thioester-linked tetraketide, a regiospecific C1, C6 Claisen condensation occurs, forming a new ring system to generate naringenin chalcone.

== Regulation ==
=== Metabolic ===
CHS is noncompetitively inhibited by flavanoid pathway products such as naringenin and chalcone naringenin. Despite lack of direct evidence in vivo, flavonoids are believed to accumulate in the cytosol to a level that blocks CHS activity to avoid toxic levels in plants.

=== Transcriptional ===
CHS is constitutively expressed in plants but can also be subject to induced expression through light/ UV light and well as in response to pathogens, elicitors and wounding. The CHS promoter contains a G-box motif with a sequence of CACGTG. This has been shown to play a role in response to light. Other light sensitive domains include Box I, Box II, Box III, Box IV or three copies of H-box (CCTACC).

The chalcone synthase gene of Petunia plants is famous for being the first gene in which the phenomenon of RNA interference was observed; researchers intending to upregulate the production of pigments in light pink or violet flowers introduced a transgene for chalcone synthase, expecting that both the native gene and the transgene would express the enzyme and result in a more deeply colored flower phenotype. Instead the transgenic plants had mottled white flowers, indicating that the introduction of the transgene had downregulated or silenced chalcone synthase expression. Further investigation of the phenomenon indicated that the downregulation was due to post-transcriptional inhibition of the chalcone synthase gene expression via an increased rate of messenger RNA degradation.

== Disease relevance ==
CHS, as the first committed step in the flavonoid pathway, facilitate production of flavanoids, isoflavonoid-type phytoalexins and other metabolites to protect the plant from stress. CHS expression is also involved in the salicyclic acid defense pathway. Being aromatic compounds, flavonoids strongly absorb UV light through a photoreceptor-mediated mechanism which effectively protects the plants from DNA damage. CHS is involved in a broader, more general phenylpropanoid pathway which serve as precursors to a range of plant metabolites important to human health such as antioxidants, anti-inflammatory agents, antiallergens, and even antioncogenic products.

== Evolution ==
CHS belongs to a broader class of enzymes known as type III PKSs. Being the first enzyme of its type to be discovered, all other members are often labeled as “CHS-like.” Most or all of the divergent CHS-like enzymes characterized have arisen from extensive duplication and subsequent genetic variation of the chs gene. Duplication provides CHS activity with functional redundancy, allowing the chs gene to mutate without endangering flavonoid biosynthesis. These divergent enzymes differ from CHS in their preference for starter molecules, the number of acetyl additions (often through malonyl-CoA) and even in the mechanism of ring formation used to cyclize identical polyketide intermediates.

The enzyme function of CHS and CHS-like enzymes function very similarly to fatty acid biosynthesis, but without the involvement of acyl-carrier proteins (ACP). Structural evidence suggests that these enzymes emerged by gain of function from ketoacyl synthase (KAS) III, an early stage enzyme of type II fatty acid biosynthesis.

Although higher plant chalcone synthases have been extensively studied, little information is available on the enzymes from bryophytes (primitive plants). Cloning of CHS from the moss Physcomitrella patens revealed an important transition from the chalcone synthases present in microorganisms to those present in higher plants.

== Literature ==
- Ayabe S, Udagawa A, Furuya T (1988). "NAD(P)H-dependent 6'-deoxychalcone synthase activity in Glycyrrhiza echinata cells induced by yeast extract". Arch. Biochem. Biophys. 261 (2): 458–62. doi:10.1016/0003-9861(88)90362-1. PMID 3355160.
- Heller W, Hahlbrock K (1980). "Highly purified "flavanone synthase" from parsley catalyzes the formation of naringenin chalcone". Arch. Biochem. Biophys. 200 (2): 617–9. doi:10.1016/0003-9861(80)90395-1. PMID 7436427.
