= Chalconoid =

Natural phenols related to chalcone

Chalcone, the structural backbone of chalconoids

Chalconoids (Greek: χαλκός khalkós, "copper", due to its color), also known as chalcones, are natural phenols derived from chalcone. They form the central core for a variety of important biological compounds.

Chalconoids have demonstrated the ability to block voltage-dependent potassium channels. Chalcones are also natural aromatase inhibitors.

Chalcones are aromatic ketones with two phenyl rings that are also intermediates in the synthesis of many biological compounds. The closure of hydroxy chalcones causes the formation of the flavonoid structure. Flavonoids are substances in the plant's secondary metabolism with an array of biological activities.

Chalconoids are also intermediating in the Auwers synthesis of flavones.

The formation of dihydrochalcones removes the conjugation between the two ring systems (via the ketone) when the double bond is abolished. This causes the visible color of the chalcones to disappear in their dihydrochalcone derivatives.

== Biosynthesis and metabolism ==
Chalcone synthase is an enzyme responsible for the production of chalconoids in plants. Chalcone isomerase is responsible for their conversion into flavanones and other flavonoids. Naringenin-chalcone synthase uses malonyl-CoA and 4-coumaroyl-CoA to produce CoA, naringenin chalcone, and CO_{2}. In aurones, the chalcone-like structure closes into a 5-atom ring instead of the more typical 6-atom ring (C ring).

== Related compounds ==
- Dihydrochalcones
