= C16H12O5 =

The molecular formula C_{16}H_{12}O_{5} (molar mass : 284.27 g/mol; exact mass : 284.068473) may refer to:

- Acacetin, a flavone
- Biochanin A, an isoflavone
- Calycosin, an isoflavone
- Genkwanin, a flavone
- Glycitein, an isoflavone
- 6-Methylapigenin
- 5-O-Methylgenistein, an isoflavone
- Oroxylin-A, a flavone
- Parietin, a cortical pigment of lichens
- Prunetin, an isoflavone
- Retusin (isoflavone)
- Sappanone A, a homoisiflavanone
- Wogonin, a flavone
- 4',7-Dihydroxy-6-methoxyflavone, a flavone
