= Isoflavonoid biosynthesis =

The biosynthesis of isoflavonoids involves several enzymes; These are:

Liquiritigenin,NADPH:oxygen oxidoreductase (hydroxylating, aryl migration), also known as Isoflavonoid synthase, is an enzyme that uses liquiritigenin (a flavanone), O_{2}, NADPH and H_{+} to produce 2,7,4'-trihydroxyisoflavanone (an isoflavonoid), H_{2}O and NADP^{+}.

- Biochanin-A reductase
- Flavone synthase
- 2'-hydroxydaidzein reductase
- 2-hydroxyisoflavanone dehydratase
- 2-hydroxyisoflavanone synthase
- Isoflavone 4'-O-methyltransferase
- Isoflavone 7-O-methyltransferase
- Isoflavone 2'-hydroxylase
- Isoflavone 3'-hydroxylase
- Isoflavone-7-O-beta-glucoside 6"-O-malonyltransferase
- Isoflavone 7-O-glucosyltransferase
- 4'-methoxyisoflavone 2'-hydroxylase

== Pterocarpans biosynthesis ==
- 3,9-dihydroxypterocarpan 6a-monooxygenase
- Glyceollin synthase
- Pterocarpin synthase

== See also ==
- Flavonoid biosynthesis
