= Pueraria mirifica =

Scientific classification
- Kingdom: Plantae
- Clade: Tracheophytes
- Clade: Angiosperms
- Clade: Eudicots
- Clade: Rosids
- Order: Fabales
- Family: Fabaceae
- Subfamily: Faboideae
- Genus: Pueraria
- Species: P. mirifica

Binomial name
- Pueraria mirifica Airy Shaw & Suvatab.

Synonyms
- Pueraria candollei var. mirifica (Airy Shaw & Suvat.) Niyomdham

Species of legume

Pueraria mirifica, also known as กวาวเครือ kwao krua (among other names), is a plant found in northern and northeastern Thailand and Myanmar.

In Thailand, the plant is known as "kwao krua kao", the 'kao' meaning white which distinguishes Pueraria mirifica from other plants with tuberous roots also sharing the 'kwao krua' designation, such as Butea superba, commonly called kwao krua deng (red) and the 'black' and 'dull grey' kwao krua plants. The species was definitively identified as Pueraria mirifica in 1952.

Dried and powdered, the tuberous root of Pueraria mirifica has a history of domestic consumption in Thailand in traditional medicine.

== History ==
Evidence of the use of Pueraria mirifica can be identified as early as the 13th century written on palm leaves, and translated into English and published in 1931, with the instructions:

To take the tuberous root of Pueraria with big leaves, pound and blend with cow's milk. The benefits of this medicine is to support memory, talk big, and be able to remember three books of the astrology, make the skin smooth like six year old kid, live more than 1,000 years and parasite diseases are not able to be of trouble.

== Etymology ==
The plant's specific name is derived from Latin mirificus 'wonderful', 'miraculous'.

== Uses ==
Some herbal supplements claim various health benefits of the extracts of Pueraria mirifica, although the claims are unsubstantiated and not backed by rigorous clinical evidence. A 2024 evidence map identified four randomized controlled trials of Pueraria mirifica, delivered orally or as a vaginal gel, for symptoms of genitourinary syndrome of menopause, with the authors noting that adequately powered, longer-duration placebo-controlled trials are needed to assess durability of benefits and safety.

== Chemical constituents ==
Pueraria mirifica contains various phytoestrogens, including deoxymiroestrol, daidzin, daidzein, genistin, genistein, coumestrol, kwakhurin, and mirificine, β-sitosterol, stigmasterol, campesterol, and mirificoumestan. There is contradictory evidence for the presence of miroestrol. Pueraria contains the cytotoxic non-phytoestrogen spinasterol.

== Adverse effects ==
The safety of using P. mirifica extracts has not been adequately demonstrated, particularly for endocrine and reproductive functions, with adverse effects possibly affecting people having elevated blood lipids, asthma, diabetes mellitus,epilepsy or systemic lupus erythematosus. Women under 18 years old, those using birth control or prescription estrogen, and pregnant or nursing mothers should not use pueraria products.

== National regulations ==
Due to inadequate evidence of safety and uncertainty about doses, several countries recommend against the use of pueraria products, have issued risk warnings, or have restricted their use in manufactured foods. Because pueraria extract does not have novel food approval in the European Union, it was banned as a food ingredient in Finland in 2009.
