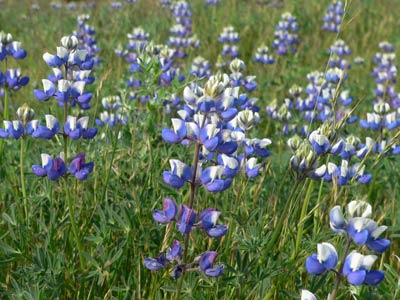

Scientific classification
- Kingdom: Plantae
- Clade: Tracheophytes
- Clade: Angiosperms
- Clade: Eudicots
- Clade: Rosids
- Order: Fabales
- Family: Fabaceae
- Subfamily: Faboideae
- Genus: Lupinus
- Subgenus: Lupinus subg. Platycarpos
- Species: L. nanus

Binomial name
- Lupinus nanus Douglas ex Benth.

= Lupinus nanus =

Species of legume

Lupinus nanus, the sky lupine, field lupine, dwarf lupin, ocean-blue lupine or Douglas' annual lupine, is a species of lupine native to the western United States. It is found natively in California, Nevada, and on Steens Mountain in eastern Oregon. It tends to grow on slopes and in open or disturbed areas below 1300 meters.

It grows 6 to 20 inches (15 to 51 cm) tall with blue flowers containing white or yellow spots. It is an annual plant that blooms in the months of March, April and May.

It contains anagyrine and is considered toxic if directly ingested. Among the biologically active chemicals found in the plant are genistein, 2'-hydroxygenistein, luteone and wighteone.

== Variation ==
Lupinus nanus has a large genetic variability. There are three accepted subspecies of Lupinus nanus:

- Lupinus nanus subsp. latifolius (Benth. ex Torr.) D.B. Dunn – Sky lupine
- Lupinus nanus subsp. menkerae (C.P.Sm.) D.B. Dunn (commonly called Menker's lupine)
- Lupinus nanus subsp. nanus Douglas ex Benth. – Sky lupine

Lupinus nanus is often found in mixed populations with Lupinus bicolor, Lupinus pachylobus, Lupinus micranthus, and Lupinus vallicola (some of these species are not currently recognized as distinct taxa in the Jepson Manual). In addition to the subspecies above, varieties include

- Lupinus nanus var. apricus (Greene) C.P.Sm.
- Lupinus nanus var. carnosulus (Greene) C.P.Sm.
- Lupinus nanus var. maritimus Hoover
- Lupinus nanus var. perlasius C.P.Sm.
- Lupinus nanus var. vallicola (A. Heller) C.P.Sm.
