= Isoflavone 7-O-glucosyltransferase =

Class of enzymes

isoflavone 7-O-glucosyltransferase

Identifiers
- EC no.: 2.4.1.170
- CAS no.: 97089-62-8

Databases
- IntEnz: IntEnz view
- BRENDA: BRENDA entry
- ExPASy: NiceZyme view
- KEGG: KEGG entry
- MetaCyc: metabolic pathway
- PRIAM: profile
- PDB structures: RCSB PDB PDBe PDBsum
- Gene Ontology: AmiGO / QuickGO
Search
- PMC: articles
- PubMed: articles
- NCBI: proteins

Isoflavone 7-O-glucosyltransferase (EC 2.4.1.170) is an enzyme that catalyzes several related chemical reaction that convert a phenolic hydroxy group in isoflavones to their glycosyl derivative.

UDP-glucose + an isoflavone $\rightleftharpoons$ UDP + an isoflavone 7-O-beta-D-glucoside

The substrates of this enzyme are an isoflavone and UDP-glucose. These produce the corresponding isoflavone 7-O-beta-D-glucoside and the by-product uridine diphosphate (UDP). For example, daidzein is converted to daidzin.

daidzein
+ UDP-glucose
UDP
daidzin

This enzyme belongs to the family of glycosyltransferases, specifically the hexosyltransferases. The systematic name of this enzyme class is UDP-glucose:isoflavone 7-O-beta-D-glucosyltransferase. Other names in common use include uridine diphosphoglucose-isoflavone 7-O-glucosyltransferase, UDPglucose-favonoid 7-O-glucosyltransferase, and UDPglucose:isoflavone 7-O-glucosyltransferase. This enzyme participates in isoflavonoid biosynthesis.
