= Isoflavonoid synthase =

Class of enzymes

Identifiers
- EC no.: 1.14.14.87

Databases
- IntEnz: IntEnz view
- BRENDA: BRENDA entry
- ExPASy: NiceZyme view
- KEGG: KEGG entry
- MetaCyc: metabolic pathway
- PRIAM: profile
- PDB structures: RCSB PDB PDBe PDBsum
Search
- PMC: articles
- PubMed: articles
- NCBI: proteins

2-hydroxyisoflavanone synthase (EC 1.14.14.87, CYT93C, IFS, isoflavonoid synthase) is an enzyme with systematic name liquiritigenin,NADPH:oxygen oxidoreductase (hydroxylating, aryl migration). It catalyses a rearrangement reaction which converts flavonoids into isoflavones, for example:

liquiritigenin
+ NADPH + H^{+}
O_{2}
H_{2}O
2,4',7-trihydroxyisoflavanone
+ NADP^{+}

The product 2,4',7-trihydroxyisoflavanone is unstable and loses water, either spontaneously or by the action of 2-hydroxyisoflavanone dehydratase, giving daidzein.

2,4',7-trihydroxyisoflavanone
H_{2}O
daidzein

The enzyme can also act on naringenin, leading to the isoflavone genistein.{

naringenin
2,4',5,7-tetrahydroxyisoflavanone
genistein

Isoflavonoid synthase is a cytochrome P450 protein containing heme. It requires a partner cytochrome P450 reductase for functional expression. This uses nicotinamide adenine dinucleotide phosphate (NADPH).
