= Medicarpin =

- Chemical structure of medicarpin

Names
- IUPAC name 9-Methoxy-6a,11a-dihydro-6H-[1]benzofuro[3,2-c]chromen-3-ol
- Other names 3-Hydroxy-9-methoxypterocarpan

Identifiers
CAS Number	32383-76-9
3D model (JSmol)	Interactive image
ChEBI	CHEBI:100
ChEMBL	ChEMBL238823
ChemSpider	298082
KEGG	C10503
PubChem CID	623060
UNII	6TX086I6IG
- InChI: InChI=1S/C16H14O4/c1-18-10-3-5-11-13-8-19-14-6-9(17)2-4-12(14)16(13)20-15(11)7-10/h2-7,13,16-17H,8H2,1H3/t13-,16-/m0/s1 Key: NSRJSISNDPOJOP-BBRMVZONSA-N; InChI=1/C16H14O4/c1-18-10-3-5-11-13-8-19-14-6-9(17)2-4-12(14)16(13)20-15(11)7-10/h2-7,13,16-17H,8H2,1H3/t13-,16-/m0/s1 Key: NSRJSISNDPOJOP-BBRMVZONBK
- SMILES: COC1=CC2=C(C=C1)[C@@H]3COC4=C([C@@H]3O2)C=CC(=C4)O

Properties
Chemical formula	C_{16}H_{14}O_{4}
Molar mass	270.27 g/mol
- Except where otherwise noted, data are given for materials in their standard state (at 25 °C [77 °F], 100 kPa). verify (what is ?) Infobox references

Medicarpin is a pterocarpan, a derivative of isoflavonoids.

== Natural occurrences ==
Medicarpin is found in Medicago truncatula and Swartzia madagascariensis. It can also be found in Maackia amurensis cell cultures.

The root nodule formation by Sinorhizobium meliloti is apparently dependent on the flavonoids pathway.

== Metabolism ==
Pterocarpin synthase has 3 substrates : medicarpin, NADP^{+} and H_{2}O, and 3 products : vestitone, NADPH and H^{+}.

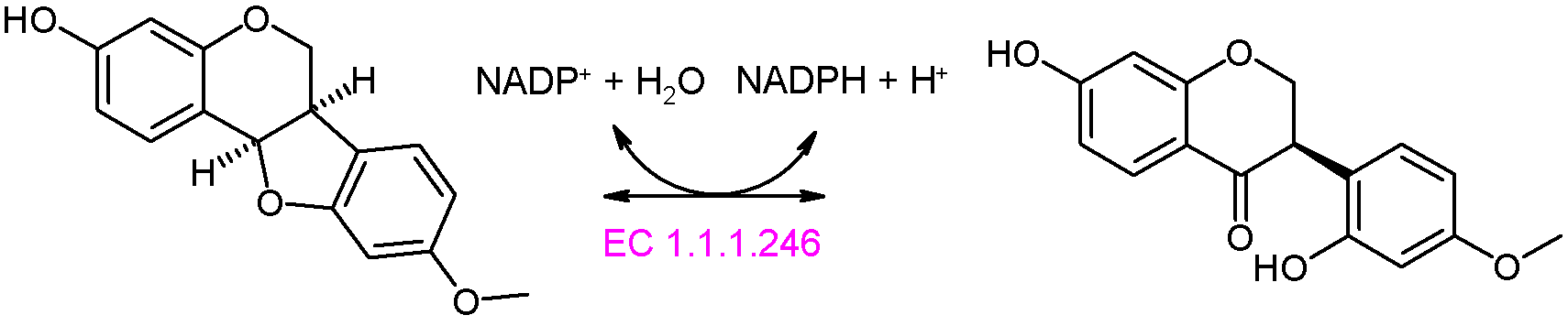
Pterocarpin synthase reaction
