= Isoflavone 7-O-methyltransferase =

Identifiers
- EC no.: 2.1.1.150
- CAS no.: 136111-54-1

Databases
- IntEnz: IntEnz view
- BRENDA: BRENDA entry
- ExPASy: NiceZyme view
- KEGG: KEGG entry
- MetaCyc: metabolic pathway
- PRIAM: profile
- PDB structures: RCSB PDB PDBe PDBsum
Search
- PMC: articles
- PubMed: articles
- NCBI: proteins

Isoflavone 7-O-methyltransferase (EC 2.1.1.150) is an enzyme that catalyzes a general chemical reaction which converts 7-hydroxyisoflavones to their 7-methoxy derivatives.

For example, genistein is converted to prunetin:

genistein
+ SAM
prunetin
+ SAH

The methylation reaction requires the cofactor, S-adenosyl methionine (SAM), to provide the methyl group, leaving the byproduct S-adenosyl-L-homocysteine (SAH). The enzyme was characterised from alfalfa. It is also capable of methylating daidzein and these reactions are often induced by attack by a pathogen, with the plant responding to an elicitor by biosynthesis of a phytoalexin.

This enzyme belongs to the family of transferases, specifically those transferring one-carbon group methyltransferases. The systematic name of this enzyme class is S-adenosyl-L-methionine:hydroxyisoflavone 7-O-methyltransferase.
