= Glycitin =

Names
- IUPAC name 7-(β-D-Glucopyranosyloxy)-4′-hydroxy-6-methoxyisoflavone
- Systematic IUPAC name 3-(4-Hydroxyphenyl)-6-methoxy-7-{[(2S,3R,4S,5S,6R)-3,4,5-trihydroxy-6-(hydroxymethyl)oxan-2-yl]oxy}-4H-1-benzopyran-4-one
- Other names Glycitein 7-O-glucoside

Identifiers
CAS Number	40246-10-4
3D model (JSmol)	Interactive image
ChEBI	CHEBI:80373
ChemSpider	163248
KEGG	C16195
PubChem CID	187808
UNII	G2S44P62XC
CompTox Dashboard (EPA)	DTXSID80193227
- InChI: InChI=1S/C22H22O10/c1-29-15-6-12-14(30-9-13(18(12)25)10-2-4-11(24)5-3-10)7-16(15)31-22-21(28)20(27)19(26)17(8-23)32-22/h2-7,9,17,19-24,26-28H,8H2,1H3/t17-,19-,20+,21-,22-/m1/s1 Key: OZBAVEKZGSOMOJ-MIUGBVLSSA-N
- SMILES: COC1=C(C=C2C(=C1)C(=O)C(=CO2)C3=CC=C(C=C3)O)O[C@H]4[C@@H]([C@H]([C@@H]([C@H](O4)CO)O)O)O

Properties
Chemical formula	C_{22}H_{22}O_{10}
Molar mass	446.408 g·mol^{−1}
- Except where otherwise noted, data are given for materials in their standard state (at 25 °C [77 °F], 100 kPa). Infobox references

Glycitin (glycitein 7-O-glucoside) is an isoflavone found in soy, and remains to various degrees in soy products like tofu, soymilk and soy sauce. Although glycitin has its own health associated properties (below), it can be transformed to glycitein by human intestinal flora by the action of beta-glucosidases.

== Properties ==
Some interesting effects of glycitin include human dermal fibroblast cell proliferation and migration via TGF‐β signaling, glycitin treatment produces anti-photoaging effects such as collagen type I and collagen type III increase at both the mRNA and protein levels. Other noted effects decreased elastase, and decreased β‐galactosidase activation. In conjunction with 4′,6,7-trimethoxyisoflavone (TMF), an isoflavone that promotes fibroblast migration but not proliferation, wound healing and anti-scarring activity (reorganization and wound fibrosis inhibition) were significantly and synergistically boosted in both in vivo mice and in vitro.
