= Genistin =

Names
- IUPAC name 7-(β-D-Glucopyranosyloxy)-4′,5-dihydroxyisoflavone
- Systematic IUPAC name 5-Hydroxy-3-(4-hydroxyphenyl)-7-{[(2S,3R,4S,5S,6R)-3,4,5-trihydroxy-6-(hydroxymethyl)oxan-2-yl]oxy}-4H-1-benzopyran-4-one
- Other names Genistoside; Genistine; Genistein 7-glucoside Genistein glucoside Genistein-7-glucoside; Genisteol 7-monoglucoside Glucosyl-7-genistein; Genistein 7-O-beta-D-glucoside

Identifiers
CAS Number	529-59-9
3D model (JSmol)	Interactive image
ChEBI	CHEBI:27514
ChEMBL	ChEMBL486625
ChemSpider	4444736
ECHA InfoCard	100.120.406
KEGG	C09126
PubChem CID	5281377
UNII	1POG3SCN5T
CompTox Dashboard (EPA)	DTXSID3022324
- InChI: InChI=1S/C21H20O10/c22-7-15-18(26)19(27)20(28)21(31-15)30-11-5-13(24)16-14(6-11)29-8-12(17(16)25)9-1-3-10(23)4-2-9/h1-6,8,15,18-24,26-28H,7H2/t15-,18-,19+,20-,21-/m1/s1 Key: ZCOLJUOHXJRHDI-CMWLGVBASA-N; InChI=1/C21H20O10/c22-7-15-18(26)19(27)20(28)21(31-15)30-11-5-13(24)16-14(6-11)29-8-12(17(16)25)9-1-3-10(23)4-2-9/h1-6,8,15,18-24,26-28H,7H2/t15-,18-,19+,20-,21-/m1/s1 Key: ZCOLJUOHXJRHDI-CMWLGVBABE
- SMILES: O=C3c4c(O)cc(O[C@@H]1O[C@@H]([C@@H](O)[C@H](O)[C@H]1O)CO)cc4O/C=C3/c2ccc(O)cc2

Properties
Chemical formula	C_{21}H_{20}O_{10}
Molar mass	432.37 g/mol
- Except where otherwise noted, data are given for materials in their standard state (at 25 °C [77 °F], 100 kPa). verify (what is ?) Infobox references

Genistin is an isoflavone found in a number of dietary plants like soy and kudzu. It was first isolated in 1931 from the 90% methanol extract of a soybean meal, when it was found that hydrolysis with hydrochloric acid produced 1 mole each of genistein and glucose. Chemically it is the 7-O-beta-D-glucoside form of genistein and is the predominant form of the isoflavone naturally occurring in plants. In fact, studies in the 1970s revealed that 99% of the isoflavonoid compounds in soy are present as their glucosides. The glucosides are converted by digestive enzymes in the digestive system to exert their biological effects. Genistin is also converted to a more familiar genistein, thus, the biological activities including antiatherosclerotic, estrogenic and anticancer effects are analogous.

== Metabolism ==
When ingested along the diet, genistin is readily converted to its aglycone form, genistein. It is hydrolyzed by removing the covalently bound glucose to form genistein and that genistein is the form of the compound that is absorbed in the intestine and is the form responsible for the biological activities of the isoflavone. The digestive metabolism was first demonstrated in 2002 that the gut microflora played a large role in the conversion of genistin to genistein. It was later found that enzymes present in the human small intestine and liver also have the ability to convert the isoflavone. Hydrolysis actually starts very quickly in the digestive system once genistin is ingested, conversion begins in the mouth and then continues in the small intestine. Moreover, both human saliva and the intestinal cell-free extract from mice can cause the complete conversion.

== Biological importance ==
=== Estrogenic activity ===
Genistin, like genistein, is a phytoestrogen as it was shown to stimulate estrogen-dependent breast cancer cell growth in vivo. At a concentration of 1200 ppm, genistin caused significant increase of growth of breast tumors (MCF-7), cellular proliferation and estrogen-responsive pS2 gene expression in mice. Removal of genistin or genistein from the diet caused tumors to regress.

=== Antiviral activity ===
Genistin and other isoflavones are demonstrated to be bioactive within the neonatal intestine and may reduce the severity of rotavirus infections; genistin alone shows inhibition of the viral infectivity by 40-60%.

=== Bone metabolism ===
In vitro study have shown that both genistin and genistein are capable of enhancing bone metabolism in the femoral-metaphyseal tissues of elderly rats. The presence of genistein or genistin in the tissue culture caused a significant increase in alkaline phosphatase activity, deoxyribonucleic acid (DNA) and calcium contents. The effect of genistein was greater than that of genistin. It is also revealed that genistin has a strong bone loss preventive activity on experimental rats, and is especially enhanced by combination with fructooligosaccharides. The amount of new bone produced by grafting genistin in collagen matrix was compared to the bone produced by collagen matrix alone in New Zealand white rabbits, and was observed that genistin caused significant increase in bone formation.
