= Prunetin =

- Chemical structure of prunetin

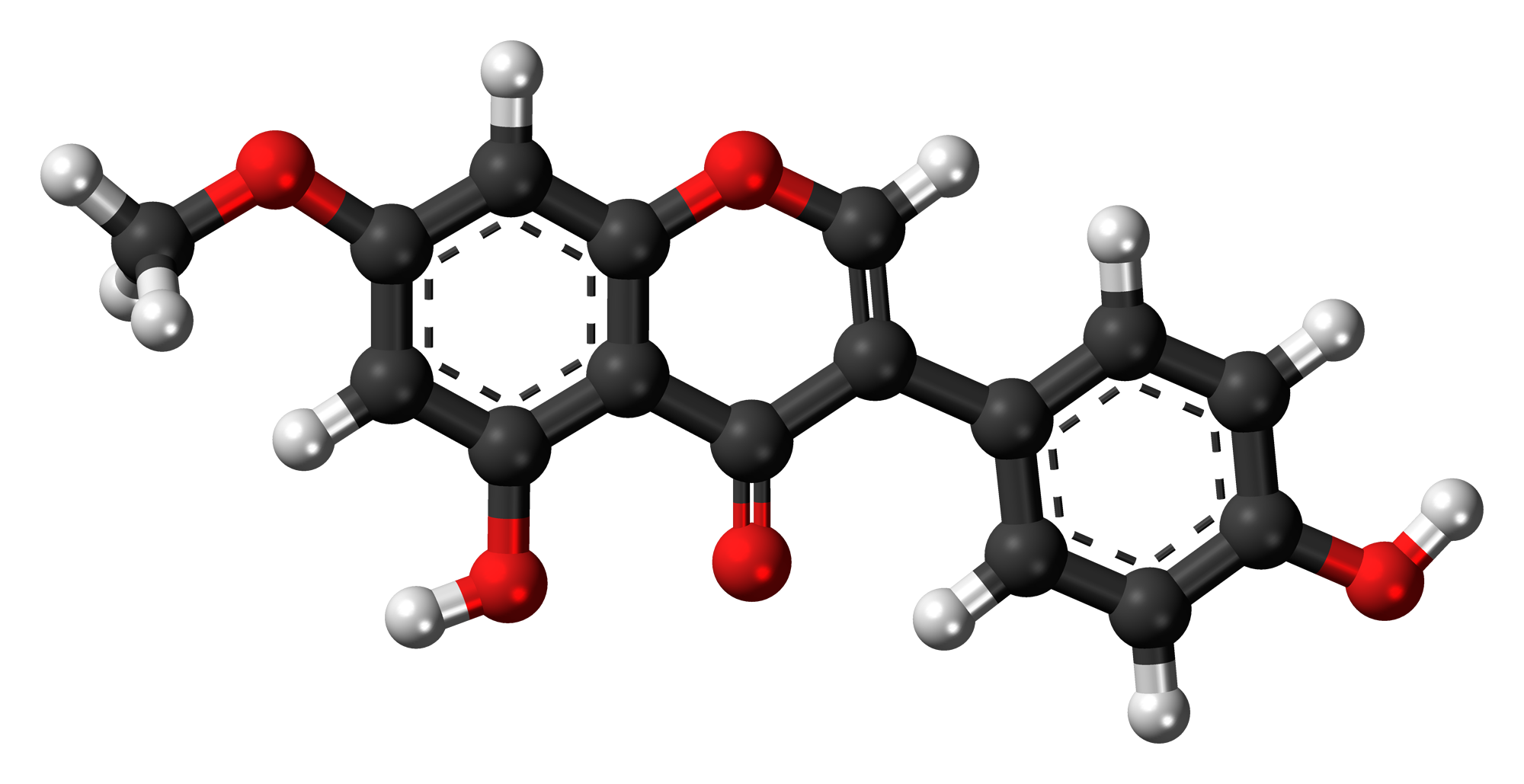

Names
- IUPAC name 4′,5-Dihydroxy-7-methoxyisoflavone
- Systematic IUPAC name 5-Hydroxy-3-(4-hydroxyphenyl)-7-methoxy-4H-1-benzopyran-4-one
- Other names Prunusetin; 5,4'-dihydroxy-7-methoxyisoflavone

Identifiers
CAS Number	552-59-0
3D model (JSmol)	Interactive image
ChEBI	CHEBI:8600
ChEMBL	ChEMBL491174
ChemSpider	4445116
ECHA InfoCard	100.008.199
EC Number	209-018-5
IUPHAR/BPS	6919
KEGG	C10521
PubChem CID	5281804
UNII	1TG4H5H11J
CompTox Dashboard (EPA)	DTXSID3022530
- InChI: InChI=1S/C16H12O5/c1-20-11-6-13(18)15-14(7-11)21-8-12(16(15)19)9-2-4-10(17)5-3-9/h2-8,17-18H,1H3 Key: KQMVAGISDHMXJJ-UHFFFAOYSA-N
- SMILES: COC1=CC(=C2C(=C1)OC=C(C2=O)C3=CC=C(C=C3)O)O

Properties
Chemical formula	C_{16}H_{12}O_{5}
Molar mass	284.26 g/mol
- Except where otherwise noted, data are given for materials in their standard state (at 25 °C [77 °F], 100 kPa). Infobox references

Prunetin is an O-methylated isoflavone, a type of flavonoid. It has been isolated for the first time by Finnemore in 1910 in the bark of Prunus emarginata (the Oregon cherry). Prunetin isolated from pea roots can act as an attractant for Aphanomyces euteiches zoospores. It is also an allosteric inhibitor of human liver aldehyde dehydrogenase.

Prunetin can lower blood pressure of spontaneously hypertensive rats and relax isolated rat aortic rings through calcium channel block mechanisms in vessel smooth muscles.

== Biosynthesis ==
Genistein is converted to prunetin by the enzyme isoflavone 7-O-methyltransferase. The methylation reaction requires the cofactor, S-adenosyl methionine (SAM), to provide the methyl group, and was characterised from alfalfa. The process can be induced by attack from a pathogen, with the plant responding with the synthesis of a phytoalexin.

genistein
+ SAM
prunetin
+ SAH

== Glycosides ==
- 8-C-glucosyl prunetin, isolated from the leaves of Dalbergia hainanensis

== See also ==
- List of phytochemicals in food
- Biochanin A
