= Daidzin =

Names
- IUPAC name 7-(β-D-Glucopyranosyloxy)-4′-hydroxyisoflavone
- Systematic IUPAC name 7-{[(2S,3R,4S,5S,6R)-6-(Hydroxymethyl)-3,4,5-trihydroxyoxan-2-yl]oxy}-3-(4-hydroxyphenyl)-4H-1-benzopyran-4-one
- Other names Daidzoside; Daidzein 7-glucoside Daidzein-7-glucoside; Daidzein 7-O-glucoside daidzein 7-O-beta-D-glucoside

Identifiers
CAS Number	552-66-9
3D model (JSmol)	Interactive image; Interactive image
ChEBI	CHEBI:42202
ChEMBL	ChEMBL486422
ChemSpider	97088
ECHA InfoCard	100.107.506
KEGG	C10216
PubChem CID	107971
UNII	4R2X91A5M5
CompTox Dashboard (EPA)	DTXSID00862180
- InChI: InChI=1S/C21H20O9/c22-8-16-18(25)19(26)20(27)21(30-16)29-12-5-6-13-15(7-12)28-9-14(17(13)24)10-1-3-11(23)4-2-10/h1-7,9,16,18-23,25-27H,8H2/t16-,18-,19+,20-,21-/m1/s1 Key: KYQZWONCHDNPDP-QNDFHXLGSA-N
- SMILES: c1cc(ccc1c2coc3cc(ccc3c2=O)O[C@H]4[C@@H]([C@H]([C@@H]([C@H](O4)CO)O)O)O)O; O=C3c4ccc(OC1O[C@@H]([C@@H](O)[C@H](O)[C@H]1O)CO)cc4O/C=C3/c2ccc(O)cc2

Properties
Chemical formula	C_{21}H_{20}O_{9}
Molar mass	416.38
- Except where otherwise noted, data are given for materials in their standard state (at 25 °C [77 °F], 100 kPa). Infobox references

Daidzin is a natural organic compound in the class of phytochemicals known as isoflavones. Daidzin can be found in Chinese plant kudzu (Pueraria lobata, Fabaceae) and from soybean leaves.

Daidzin is the 7-O-glucoside of daidzein.

Daidzin has shown the potential for the treatment of alcohol dependency (antidipsotropic) based on animal models.

== List of plants that contain the chemical ==
- Pueraria candollei
- Pueraria lobata
- Pueraria thomsonii
- Pueraria thunbergiana

== Biosynthesis ==
Daidzin is an isoflavone, which are isomers of the large group of plant metabolites called flavones. Its biosynthesis begins in a phenylpropanoid metabolic pathway from the amino acid phenylalanine. After several steps, the intermediate daidzein is formed. The enzyme isoflavone 7-O-glucosyltransferase then adds a glycosyl group by transfer from UDP-glucose.

daidzein
+ UDP-glucose
daidzin
+ UDP

== See also ==
- Daidzein
