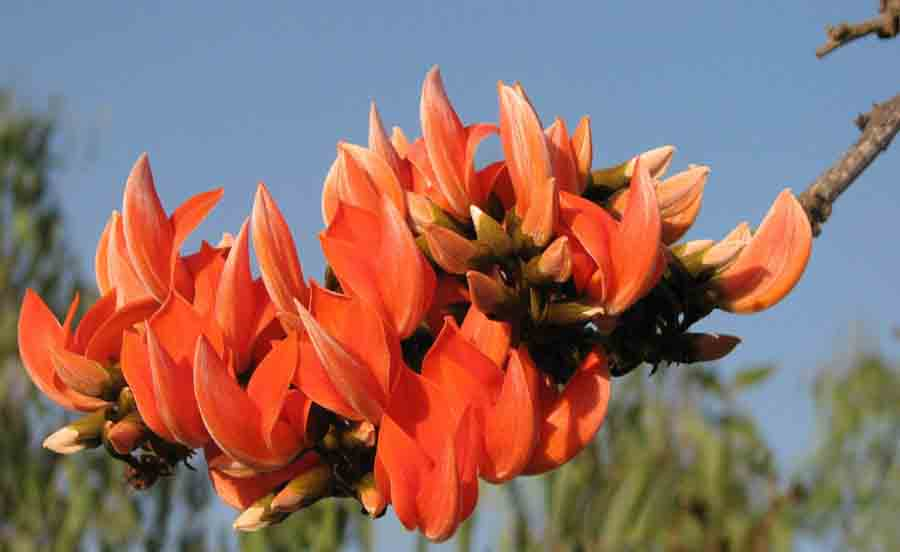
- Butea monosperma flowers in India

Scientific classification
- Kingdom: Plantae
- Clade: Tracheophytes
- Clade: Angiosperms
- Clade: Eudicots
- Clade: Rosids
- Order: Fabales
- Family: Fabaceae
- Subfamily: Faboideae
- Tribe: Phaseoleae
- Genus: Butea; Roxb. ex Willd. (1802), nom. cons.

Type species
- Butea monosperma (Lamarck) Kuntze

Species
- Butea buteiformis (Voigt) Grierson; Butea monosperma (Lam.) Kuntze; Butea pellita Hook.f. ex Prain; Butea superba Roxb. ex Willd.; Butea xizangensis X.Y.Zhu & Y.F.Du

Synonyms
- Megalotropis Griff. (1854); Meizotropis Voigt (1845); Plaso Adans. (1763)

= Butea =

Genus of legumes

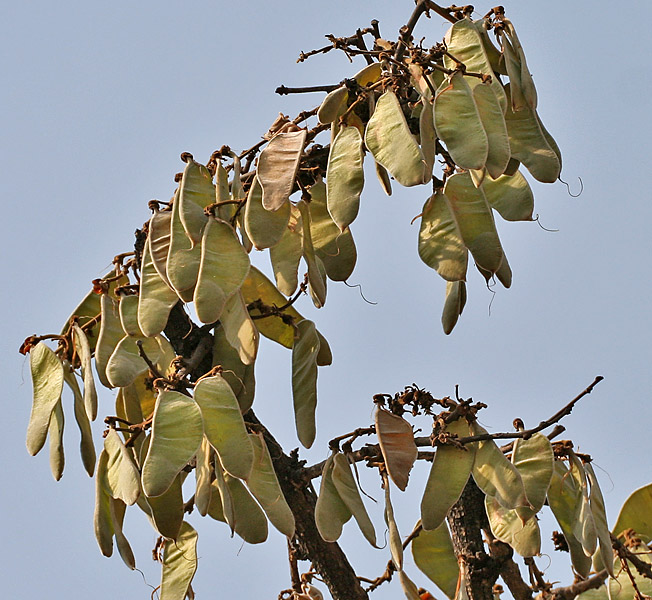
Butea monosperma seed pods

Butea is a genus of flowering plants belonging to the pea family, Fabaceae. It includes five species native to the Indian Subcontinent, Indochina, Tibet, and southern China. It is sometimes considered to have only two species, B. monosperma and B. superba, or is expanded to include four or five.

Butea monosperma is used for timber, resin, fodder, herbal medicine, and dyeing.

Butea is also a host to the lac insect, which produces natural lacquer.

== Taxonomy ==
Butea is named after John Stuart, 3rd Earl of Bute (1713–1792), member of parliament, prime minister for one year, and a patron of botany. William Roxburgh erected the genus Butea in 1795, but it became a nomen invalidum. Carl Willdenow validated the name Butea in 1802.

== Uses ==
Butea monosperma, called kiṃśukha in Sanskrit, is used in Ayurvedic medicine to treat various symptoms.

== Species ==
Forty-two names have been published in Butea, but forty of these are either synonyms or names of species that have been transferred to other genera. Five species are currently accepted.

- Butea buteiformis (Voigt) Grierson (syn. Megalotropis buteiformis, Meizotropis buteiformis) – Himalayas, India, Myanmar, and northern Thailand
- Butea monosperma (Lam.) Kuntze (syn. Butea frondosa, Erythrina monosperma) – flame-of-the-forest, bastard teak, pâlāsh – Indian subcontinent, Indochina, and southern China
- Butea pellita Hook.f. ex Prain – west-central and central Himalayas
- Butea superba Roxb. ex Willd. (syn. Plaso superba, Rudolphia superba) – India, Bangladesh, and Indochina
- Butea xizangensis X.Y.Zhu & Y.F.Du – Tibet
