= Biochanin-A reductase =

Class of enzymes

biochanin-A reductase

Identifiers
- EC no.: 1.3.1.46
- CAS no.: 112198-90-0

Databases
- IntEnz: IntEnz view
- BRENDA: BRENDA entry
- ExPASy: NiceZyme view
- KEGG: KEGG entry
- MetaCyc: metabolic pathway
- PRIAM: profile
- PDB structures: RCSB PDB PDBe PDBsum
- Gene Ontology: AmiGO / QuickGO
Search
- PMC: articles
- PubMed: articles
- NCBI: proteins

In enzymology, biochanin-A reductase (EC 1.3.1.46) is an enzyme that catalyzes the chemical reaction

biochanin A
+ NADPH
H^{+}
H^{+}
2,3-dihydrobiochanin A
+ NADP^{+}

The three substrates of this enzyme are biochanin A, reduced nicotinamide adenine dinucleotide phosphate (NADPH), and a proton. Its products are 2,3-dihydrobiochanin A and oxidised NADP^{+}.

This enzyme belongs to the family of oxidoreductases, specifically those acting on the CH-CH group of donor with NAD+ or NADP+ as acceptor. The systematic name of this enzyme class is dihydrobiochanin-A:NADP+ Delta2-oxidoreductase. This enzyme participates in isoflavonoid biosynthesis.
