= Rutin =

- Rutin

Names
- IUPAC name 3′,4′,5,7-Tetrahydroxy-3-[α-L-rhamnopyranosyl-(1→6)-β-D-glucopyranosyloxy]flavone
- Systematic IUPAC name (4^{2}S,4^{3}R,4^{4}S,4^{5}S,4^{6}R,7^{2}R,7^{3}R,7^{4}R,7^{5}R,7^{6}S)-1^{3},1^{4},2^{5},2^{7},4^{3},4^{4},4^{5},7^{3},7^{4},7^{5}-Decahydroxy-7^{6}-methyl-2^{4}H-3,6-dioxa-2(2,3)-[1]benzopyrana-4(2,6),7(2)-bis(oxana)-1(1)-benzenaheptaphane-2^{4}-one
- Other names Rutoside (INN); Phytomelin; Sophorin; Birutan; Eldrin; Birutan Forte; Rutin trihydrate Globularicitrin; Violaquercitrin; Quercetin rutinoside

Identifiers
CAS Number	153-18-4
3D model (JSmol)	Interactive image
ChemSpider	4444362
DrugBank	DB01698
ECHA InfoCard	100.005.287
KEGG	C05625
PubChem CID	5280805
RTECS number	VM2975000
UNII	5G06TVY3R7
CompTox Dashboard (EPA)	DTXSID3022326
- InChI: InChI=1S/C27H30O16/c1-8-17(32)20(35)22(37)26(40-8)39-7-15-18(33)21(36)23(38)27(42-15)43-25-19(34)16-13(31)5-10(28)6-14(16)41-24(25)9-2-3-11(29)12(30)4-9/h2-6,8,15,17-18,20-23,26-33,35-38H,7H2,1H3/t8-,15+,17-,18+,20+,21-,22+,23+,26+,27-/m0/s1
- SMILES: CC1C(C(C(C(O1)OCC2C(C(C(C(O2)OC3=C(OC4=CC(=CC(=C4C3=O)O)O)C5=CC(=C(C=C5)O)O)O)O)O)O)O)O

Properties
Chemical formula	C_{27}H_{30}O_{16}
Molar mass	610.521 g·mol^{−1}
Appearance	Solid
Melting point	242 °C (468 °F; 515 K)
Solubility in water	12.5 mg/100 mL; 13 mg/100mL

Pharmacology
ATC code	C05CA01 (WHO)

Hazards
NFPA 704 (fire diamond)	2 0 0
- Except where otherwise noted, data are given for materials in their standard state (at 25 °C [77 °F], 100 kPa). verify (what is ?) Infobox references

Rutin (rutoside, quercetin-3-O-rutinoside or sophorin) is the glycoside combining the flavonol quercetin and the disaccharide rutinose (α-L-rhamnopyranosyl-(1→6)-β-D-glucopyranose). It is a flavonoid glycoside found in a wide variety of plants, including citrus.

== Occurrences ==
Rutin is one of the phenolic compounds found in the plant species Carpobrotus edulis. Its name comes from the name of Ruta graveolens, a plant that also contains rutin. Various citrus fruit peels contain 32 to 49 mg per g of flavonoids expressed as rutin equivalents. Citrus leaves contain rutin at concentrations of 11 mg per g in orange trees and 7 mg per g in lime trees. In 2021, Samoan researchers identified rutin in the native plant matalafi (Psychotria insularum).

== Metabolism ==
The enzyme quercitrinase found in Aspergillus flavus is in the rutin catabolic pathway.

== In food ==
Rutin is a citrus flavonoid glycoside found in many plants, including buckwheat, the leaves and petioles of Rheum species, and asparagus. Tartary buckwheat seeds have been found to contain more rutin (about 0.8–1.7% dry weight) than common buckwheat seeds (0.01% dry weight). Rutin is one of the primary flavonols found in 'clingstone' peaches. It is also found in green tea infusions.

Approximate rutin content of selected foods, in milligrams per 100 grams or milliliters:

Sortable table
Numeric	Alphabetic
389	Tartary buckwheat, roasted bran
332	Capers, spice
68	Tartary buckwheat, roasted grain
45	Olive (black), raw
36	Buckwheat, whole grain flour
32	Green tea, infusion
23	Asparagus, raw
19	Black raspberry, raw
17	Black tea, infusion
11	Red raspberry, raw
9	Buckwheat, groats, thermally treated
6	Buckwheat, refined flour
6	Greencurrant
6	Plum, fresh
5	Blackcurrant, raw
4	Blackberry, raw
3	Tomato (cherry), whole, raw
2	Prune
2	Fenugreek
2	Marjoram, dried
1	Grape, raisin
1	Zucchini, raw
1	Apricot, raw
0	Apple
0	Redcurrant
0	Grape (green)
0	Tomato, whole, raw

== Research ==
Rutin (rutoside or rutinoside) and other dietary flavonols are under preliminary clinical research for their potential biological effects, such as in reducing post-thrombotic syndrome, venous insufficiency, or endothelial dysfunction, but there remains no high-quality evidence for their safe and effective uses, as of 2018. A 2020 review indicated that oral rutosides may reduce leg edema by a small amount in people with post-thrombotic syndrome, but the risk of adverse effects was higher.

As a flavonol among similar flavonoids, rutin has low bioavailability due to poor absorption, high metabolism, and rapid excretion that collectively make its biological properties in vivo difficult to study, and its potential for use as a therapeutic agent limited.

== Biosynthesis ==
The biosynthesis pathway of rutin in mulberry (Morus alba L.) leaves begins with phenylalanine, which produces cinnamic acid under the action of phenylalanine ammonia lyase (PAL). Cinnamic acid is catalyzed by cinnamic acid-4-hydroxylase (C4H) and 4-coumarate-CoA ligase (4CL) to form p-coumaroyl-CoA. Subsequently, chalcone synthase (CHS) catalyzes the condensation of p-coumaroyl-CoA and three molecules of malonyl-CoA to produce naringenin chalcone, which is eventually converted into naringenin flavanone with the participation of chalcone isomerase (CHI). With the action of flavanone 3-hydroxylas (F3H), dihydrokaempferol (DHK) is generated. DHK can be further hydroxylated by flavonoid 3´-hydroxylase (F3'H) to produce dihydroquercetin (DHQ), which is then catalyzed by flavonol synthase (FLS) to form quercetin. After quercetin is catalyzed by UDP-glucose flavonoid 3-O-glucosyltransferase (UFGT) to form isoquercitrin, finally, the formation of rutin from isoquercitrin is catalyzed by flavonoid 3-O-glucoside L-rhamnosyltransferase.
