= Flavonol-3-O-glucoside L-rhamnosyltransferase =

Class of enzymes

Identifiers
- EC no.: 2.4.1.159
- CAS no.: 83380-89-6

Databases
- IntEnz: IntEnz view
- BRENDA: BRENDA entry
- ExPASy: NiceZyme view
- KEGG: KEGG entry
- MetaCyc: metabolic pathway
- PRIAM: profile
- PDB structures: RCSB PDB PDBe PDBsum
- Gene Ontology: AmiGO / QuickGO
Search
- PMC: articles
- PubMed: articles
- NCBI: proteins

Flavonol-3-O-glucoside L-rhamnosyltransferase (EC 2.4.1.159) is an enzyme that catalyzes the general chemical reaction

UDP-L-rhamnose + a flavonol 3-O-D-glucoside $\rightleftharpoons$ UDP + a flavonol 3-O-[beta-L-rhamnosyl-(1->6)-beta-D-glucoside]

The two substrates of this enzyme are UDP-L-rhamnose and a flavonol 3-O-D-glucoside. Its products are uridine diphosphate (UDP) and the corresponding flavonol 3-O-[beta-L-rhamnosyl-(1->6)-beta-D-glucoside].

For example, the enzyme converts isoquercetin to rutin by adding an L-rhamnose sugar unit from UDP-L-rhamnose. It has been characterised from tulip and Arabidopsis thaliana.

isoquercetin
+ UDP-L-rhamnose
UDP
rutin

This enzyme belongs to the family of glycosyltransferases, specifically the hexosyltransferases. The systematic name of this enzyme class is UDP-L-rhamnose:flavonol-3-O-D-glucoside 6''-O-L-rhamnosyltransferase. Other names in common use include uridine diphosphorhamnose-flavonol 3-O-glucoside, rhamnosyltransferase, and UDP-rhamnose:flavonol 3-O-glucoside rhamnosyltransferase.
