= Isoquercetin =

- Isoquercitrin structure

Names
- IUPAC name 3-(β-D-Glucopyranosyloxy)-3′,4′,5,7-tetrahydroxyflavone
- Systematic IUPAC name 2-(3,4-Dihydroxyphenyl)-5,7-dihydroxy-3-{[(2S,3R,4S,5S,6R)-3,4,5-trihydroxy-6-(hydroxymethyl)oxan-2-yl]oxy}-4H-1-benzopyran-4-one
- Other names Isoquercitroside; Isoquercitrin; Isoquercetin; Trifoliin; Isotrifolin; Trifoliin A Isohyperoside; Isotrifoliin; Quercetin-3-glucoside; Quercetin-3-O-glucoside; Quercetin 3-O-β-D-glucopyranoside

Identifiers
CAS Number	482-35-9
3D model (JSmol)	Interactive image
ChEBI	CHEBI:68352
ChEMBL	ChEMBL250450
ChemSpider	4444361
DrugBank	DB12665
ECHA InfoCard	100.123.856
EC Number	640-533-1
KEGG	C05623
PubChem CID	5280804
UNII	6HN2PC637T
CompTox Dashboard (EPA)	DTXSID3041110
- InChI: InChI=1S/C21H20O12/c22-6-13-15(27)17(29)18(30)21(32-13)33-20-16(28)14-11(26)4-8(23)5-12(14)31-19(20)7-1-2-9(24)10(25)3-7/h1-5,13,15,17-18,21-27,29-30H,6H2/t13-,15-,17+,18-,21+/m1/s1 Key: OVSQVDMCBVZWGM-QSOFNFLRSA-N
- SMILES: C1=CC(=C(C=C1C2=C(C(=O)C3=C(C=C(C=C3O2)O)O)O[C@H]4[C@@H]([C@H]([C@@H]([C@H](O4)CO)O)O)O)O)O

Properties
Chemical formula	C_{21}H_{20}O_{12}
Molar mass	464.379 g·mol^{−1}
- Except where otherwise noted, data are given for materials in their standard state (at 25 °C [77 °F], 100 kPa). Infobox references

Isoquercetin (also known as isoquercitrin or isotrifoliin) is a flavonoid, a type of chemical compound. It is the 3-O-glucoside of quercetin. Isoquercitrin can be isolated from various plant species including Mangifera indica (mango) and Rheum nobile (the Noble rhubarb). It is also present in the leaves of Annona squamosa, Camellia sinensis (tea), and Vestia foetida.

== Spectral data ==
The lambda-max for isoquercetin is 254.8 and 352.6 nm.

== Biosynthesis and metabolism ==
Isoquercetin if formed from quercetin by action of the enzyme flavonol 3-O-glucosyltransferase in plants such as the tulip.

quercetin
+ UDP-glucose
UDP
isoquercetin

The enzyme flavonol-3-O-glucoside L-rhamnosyltransferase in tulips converts isoquercetin to rutin by adding an L-rhamnose sugar unit from UDP-L-rhamnose, with uridine diphosphate (UDP) as byproduct.

isoquercetin + UDP-L-rhamnose
UDP
rutin

== Potential clinical uses ==
Isoquercetin is presently being investigated for prevention of thromboembolism in selected cancer patients and as an anti-fatigue agent in kidney cancer patients treated with sunitinib.

There is a single case report of its use in the successful treatment of prurigo nodularis, a difficult to treat pruritic eruption of the skin.

Isoquercetin belongs to the class of chemical compounds known as pan-assay interference compounds (PAINS), which frequently give false positive results in assays for pharmacological activities.

== See also ==
- Quercitrin
