= 2-hydroxyisoflavanone dehydratase =

Class of enzymes

Identifiers
- EC no.: 4.2.1.105
- CAS no.: 56022-25-4

Databases
- IntEnz: IntEnz view
- BRENDA: BRENDA entry
- ExPASy: NiceZyme view
- KEGG: KEGG entry
- MetaCyc: metabolic pathway
- PRIAM: profile
- PDB structures: RCSB PDB PDBe PDBsum
Search
- PMC: articles
- PubMed: articles
- NCBI: proteins

The enzyme 2-hydroxyisoflavanone dehydratase (EC 4.2.1.105) catalyzes the chemical reaction

2,4',7-trihydroxyisoflavanone
H_{2}O
daidzein

This enzyme belongs to the family of lyases, specifically the hydro-lyases, which cleave carbon-oxygen bonds. The systematic name of this enzyme class is 2,7,4′-trihydroxyisoflavanone hydro-lyase (daidzein-forming). This enzyme is also called 2,7,4′-trihydroxyisoflavanone hydro-lyase. This enzyme forms part of the pathway to isoflavones from flavonoids. The starting material, 2,4',7-trihydroxyisoflavanone, is produced from liquiritigenin by the enzyme isoflavonoid synthase

liquiritigenin
Synthase
2,4',7-trihydroxyisoflavanone

2-hydroxyisoflavanone dehydratase also acts on the intermediate tetrahydroxyisoflavanone produced from naringenin, leading to genistein.

naringenin
Synthase
2,4',5,7-tetrahydroxyisoflavanone
Dehydratase
H_{2}O
genistein

The variant GmHID1 from Glycine max shows both these activities.
