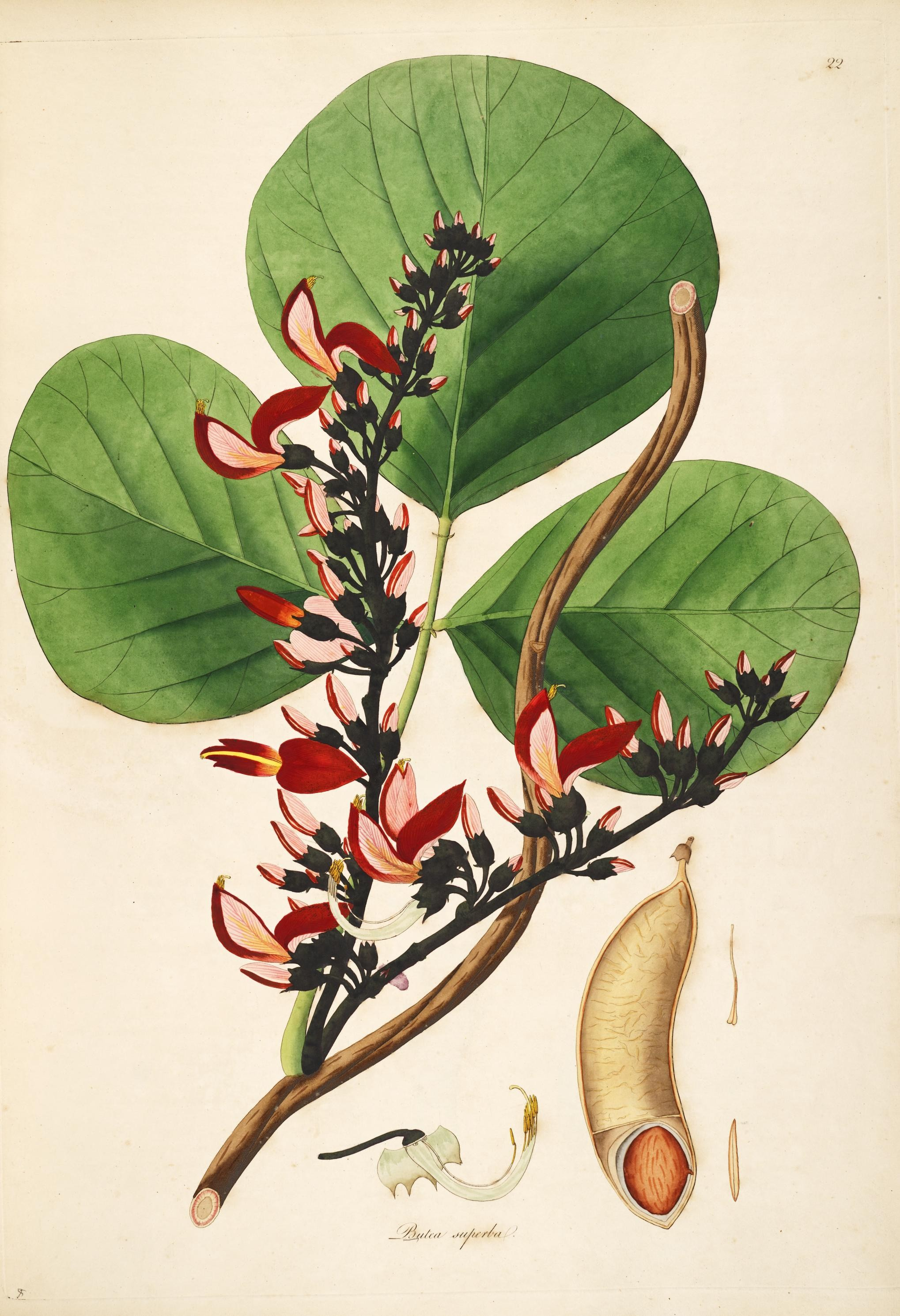

Scientific classification
- Kingdom: Plantae
- Clade: Tracheophytes
- Clade: Angiosperms
- Clade: Eudicots
- Clade: Rosids
- Order: Fabales
- Family: Fabaceae
- Subfamily: Faboideae
- Genus: Butea
- Species: B. superba

Binomial name
- Butea superba Roxb.

= Butea superba =

Species of legume

Butea superba is a vining shrub in the legume family Fabaceae, native to India and mainland Southeast Asia. It is thought by locals to be an aphrodisiac, among other effects.

== Efficacy ==
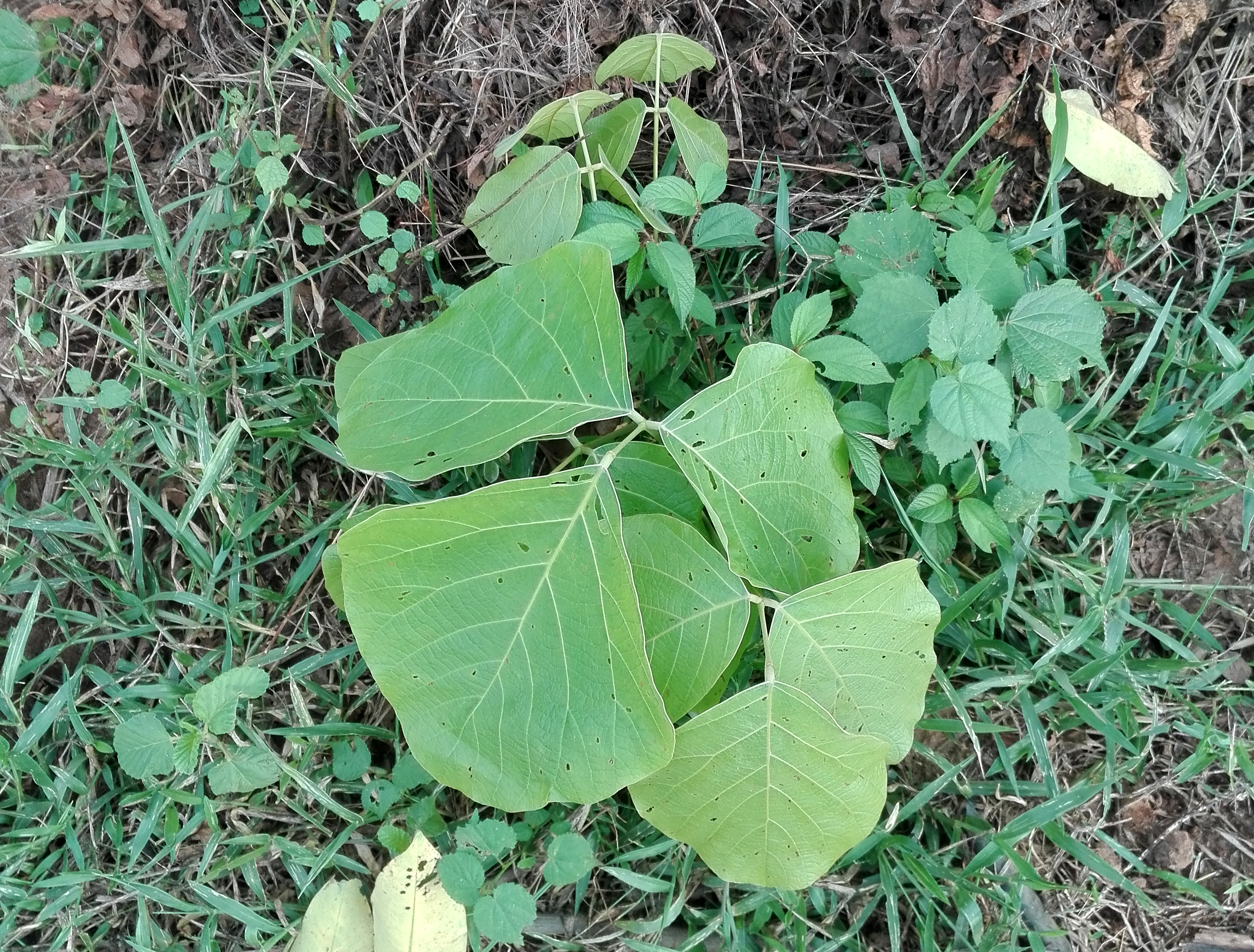
Sapling in the Eastern Ghats of India

Existing open trials have come to conflicting conclusions about the efficacy of butea, though they used completely different products at different doses and in different populations. No placebo-controlled clinical studies exist so far to support aphrodisiac activity.

== Actions ==
The tuberous roots of Butea superba were found to contain flavonoids and flavonoid glycosides as well as sterol compounds, including β-sitosterol, campesterol and stigmasterol.

== Safety ==
One study in rats found the application of high doses of dried plant material (200 mg/kg body weight) had a negative impact on several blood parameters and decreased testosterone.

== See also ==
- Pueraria mirifica (white kwao krua)
