= Biliatresone =

Names
- Preferred IUPAC name 1-(4,6-Dimethoxy-2H-1,3-benzodioxol-5-yl)-2-(2-hydroxyphenyl)prop-2-en-1-one

Identifiers
CAS Number	1801433-90-8
3D model (JSmol)	Interactive image
ChEBI	CHEBI:131631
ChemSpider	58827638
PubChem CID	124079379
CompTox Dashboard (EPA)	DTXSID901046375
- InChI: InChI=1S/C18H16O6/c1-10(11-6-4-5-7-12(11)19)16(20)15-13(21-2)8-14-17(18(15)22-3)24-9-23-14/h4-8,19H,1,9H2,2-3H3 Key: SIKIIXNKUAAGAM-UHFFFAOYSA-N
- SMILES: O=C(C(C1=C(O)C=CC=C1)=C)C2=C(OC)C3=C(OCO3)C=C2OC

Properties
Chemical formula	C_{18}H_{16}O_{6}
Molar mass	328.320 g·mol^{−1}
- Except where otherwise noted, data are given for materials in their standard state (at 25 °C [77 °F], 100 kPa). (what is ?) Infobox references

Biliatresone is an example of a very rare type of a naturally occurring isoflavonoid-related 1,2-diaryl-2-propenone found in Dysphania glomulifera and D. littoralis. It has been found to cause extrahepatic biliary atresia in a zebrafish model. The enone moiety of biliatresone is particularly reactive, being enhanced by the methylenedioxy, methoxy and hydroxy groups, and undergoes ready Michael addition of water and methanol.
