= 6-Methylapigenin =

GABAA PAM, flavonoid

Names
- IUPAC name 5,7-Dihydroxy-2-(4-hydroxyphenyl)-6-methylchromen-4-one

Identifiers
CAS Number	5526-57-8
3D model (JSmol)	Interactive image
ChEBI	CHEBI:184639
ChemSpider	8141208
PubChem CID	9965615
CompTox Dashboard (EPA)	DTXSID70433447
- InChI: Key: ZLGRXDWWYMFIGI-UHFFFAOYSA-N; InChI=1S/C16H12O5/c1-8-11(18)6-14-15(16(8)20)12(19)7-13(21-14)9-2-4-10(17)5-3-9/h2-7,17-18,20H,1H3
- SMILES: CC1=C(C2=C(C=C1O)OC(=CC2=O)C3=CC=C(C=C3)O)O

Properties
Chemical formula	C_{16}H_{12}O_{5}
Molar mass	284.267 g·mol^{−1}
- Except where otherwise noted, data are given for materials in their standard state (at 25 °C [77 °F], 100 kPa). Infobox references

6-Methylapigenin is a naturally occurring flavonoid and a derivative of apigenin. It has activity at GABA_{A} receptors as a positive modulator.

== Natural occurrence ==
6-Methylapigenin can be found in multiple plants, such as Valeriana officinalis, Valeriana jatamansi, and Picea neoveitchii.

== Biological activity ==
6-Methylapigenin binds to the GABA_{A} receptor on the benzodiazepine binding site. This compound possesses anxiolytic effects. In a mouse model, it is also able to potentiate sleep induced by hesperidin, another flavonoid. However, since it does not have the chemical structure of benzodiazepines, it can therefore be classed as a nonbenzodiazepine.
