= Miroestrol =

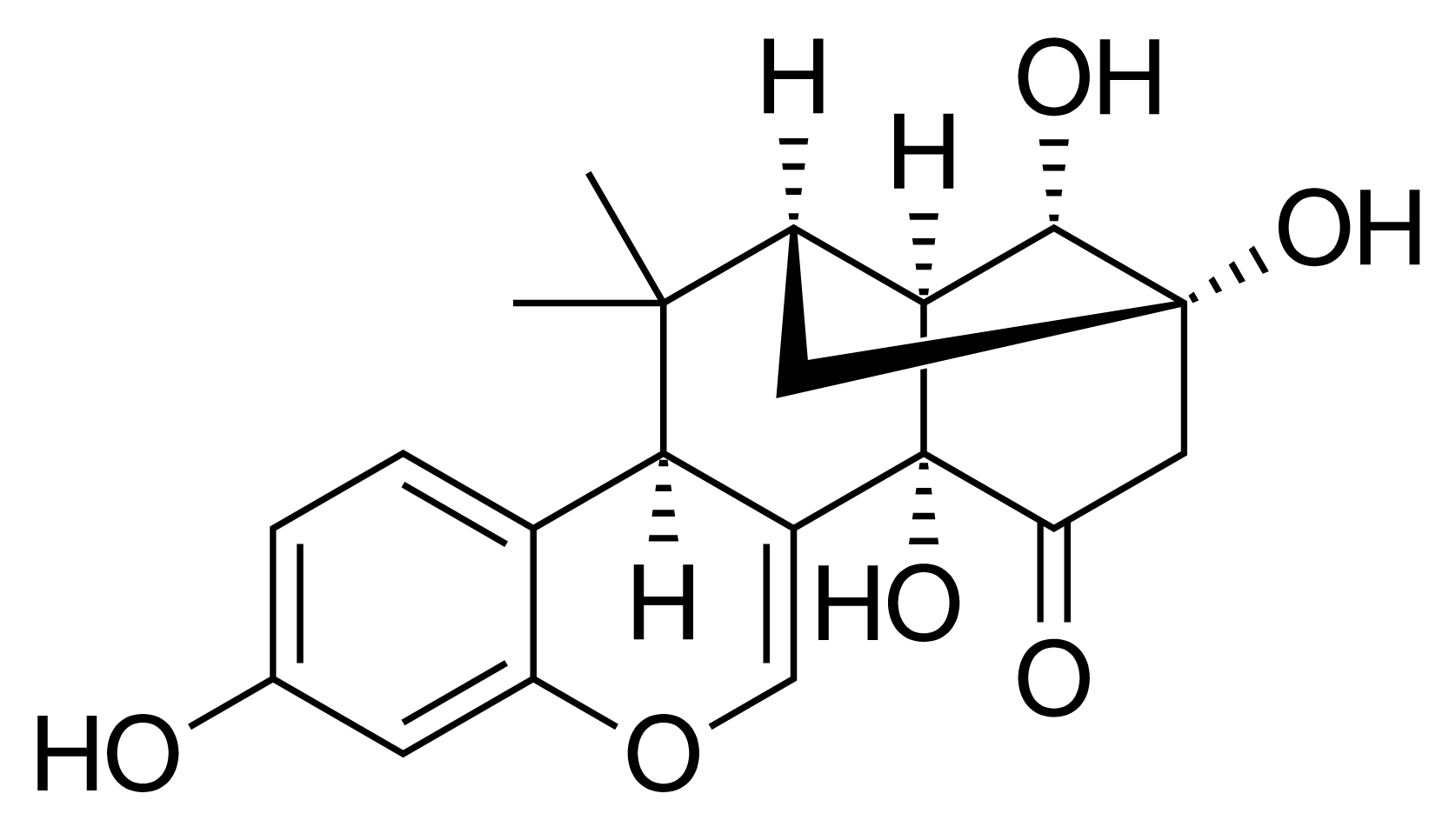

Names
- IUPAC name (3R,13S,17R,18S)-7,13,16,17-Tetrahydroxy-2,2-dimethyl-10-oxapentacyclo[14.2.1.0^{3,12}.0^{4,9}.0^{13,18}]nonadeca-4,6,8,11-tetraen-14-one
- Other names (+)-Miroestrol

Identifiers
CAS Number	2618-41-9
3D model (JSmol)	Interactive image
ChemSpider	144658
KEGG	C08831
PubChem CID	165001
CompTox Dashboard (EPA)	DTXSID30949054
- InChI: InChI=1S/C20H22O6/c1-18(2)11-6-19(24)7-14(22)20(25,16(11)17(19)23)12-8-26-13-5-9(21)3-4-10(13)15(12)18/h3-5,8,11,15-17,21,23-25H,6-7H2,1-2H3/t11-,15+,16-,17+,19+,20-/m0/s1 Key: RJKLDOLOCIQYFS-PRTISISMSA-N; InChI=1/C20H22O6/c1-18(2)11-6-19(24)7-14(22)20(25,16(11)17(19)23)12-8-26-13-5-9(21)3-4-10(13)15(12)18/h3-5,8,11,15-17,21,23-25H,6-7H2,1-2H3/t11-,15+,16-,17+,19+,20-/m0/s1 Key: RJKLDOLOCIQYFS-PRTISISMBT
- SMILES: CC1([C@@H]2C3=C(C=C(C=C3)O)OC=C2[C@]4([C@H]5C1CC([C@@H]5O)(CC4=O)O)O)C

Properties
Chemical formula	C_{20}H_{22}O_{6}
Molar mass	358.385
- Except where otherwise noted, data are given for materials in their standard state (at 25 °C [77 °F], 100 kPa). verify (what is ?) Infobox references

Miroestrol is a phytoestrogen, a plant-derived chemical that mimics the biological activity of the hormone estrogen. Miroestrol was first reportedly isolated from the Thai herb Pueraria mirifica in 1960 and thought to be responsible for the supposed rejuvenating properties of the plant. However, more recent studies have suggested that the active ingredient may actually be the closely related chemical compound deoxymiroestrol (shown below), and the reported presence of miroestrol may only have been an artifact of the isolation procedure. When deoxymiroestrol is exposed to the oxygen in air, it is converted to miroestrol.

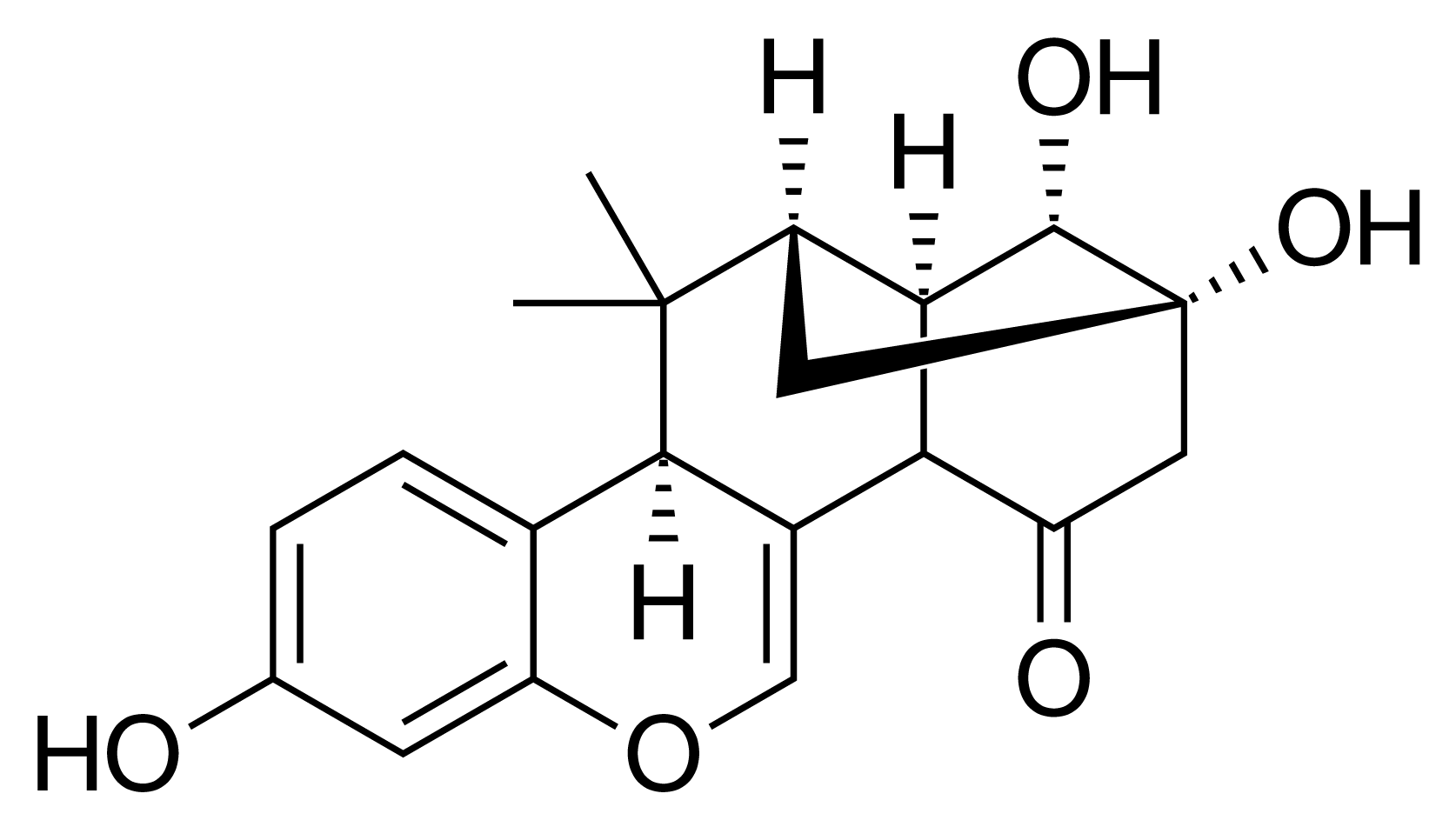
Chemical structure of deoxymiroestrol

A comparative study of the estrogenic properties of phytoestrogens found that both deoxymiroestrol and miroestrol were comparable in activity in vitro to other known phytoestrogens such as coumestrol as 17β-oestradiol agonists. Because of their estrogenic activities, miroestrol, deoxymiroestrol, and other related compounds have been the targets of scientific research including total synthesis.

Extracts of Pueraria mirifica reportedly containing miroestrol are marketed as dietary supplements intended to lead to breast enhancement in women. However, there is a lack of conclusive evidence for such claims. The Federal Trade Commission has taken legal action against marketers for these unproven claims.
