= Pterocarpin synthase =

pterocarpin synthase

Identifiers
- EC no.: 1.1.1.246
- CAS no.: 118477-70-6

Databases
- BRENDA: enzyme data
- ExPASy: NiceZyme view
- KEGG: enzyme entry
- MetaCyc: metabolic pathway
- Rhea: reactions
- PDB structures: RCSB PDB PDBe PDBsum
- Gene Ontology: AmiGO / QuickGO
Search
- PMC: articles
- PubMed: articles
- NCBI: proteins

Reaction

In enzymology, a pterocarpin synthase (EC 1.1.1.246) is an enzyme that catalyzes the chemical reaction

medicarpin + NADP^{+} + H_{2}O $\rightleftharpoons$ vestitone + NADPH + H^{+}

The 3 substrates of this enzyme are medicarpin, NADP^{+}, and H_{2}O, whereas its 3 products are vestitone, NADPH, and H^{+}.

This enzyme belongs to the family of oxidoreductases, specifically those acting on the CH-OH group of donor with NAD^{+} or NADP^{+} as acceptor. The systematic name of this enzyme class is medicarpin:NADP^{+} 2'-oxidoreductase. This enzyme is also called pterocarpan synthase. This enzyme participates in isoflavonoid biosynthesis.
