= Flavonoid biosynthesis =

Flavonoids are synthesized by the phenylpropanoid metabolic pathway in which the amino acid phenylalanine is used to produce 4-coumaroyl-CoA. This can be combined with malonyl-CoA to yield the true backbone of flavonoids, a group of compounds called chalcones, which contain two phenyl rings. Conjugate ring-closure of chalcones results in the familiar form of flavonoids, the three-ringed structure of a flavone. The metabolic pathway continues through a series of enzymatic modifications to yield flavanones → dihydroflavonols → anthocyanins. Along this pathway, many products can be formed, including the flavonols, flavan-3-ols, proanthocyanidins (tannins) and a host of other various polyphenolics.

Flavonoid Biosynthesis Diagrams

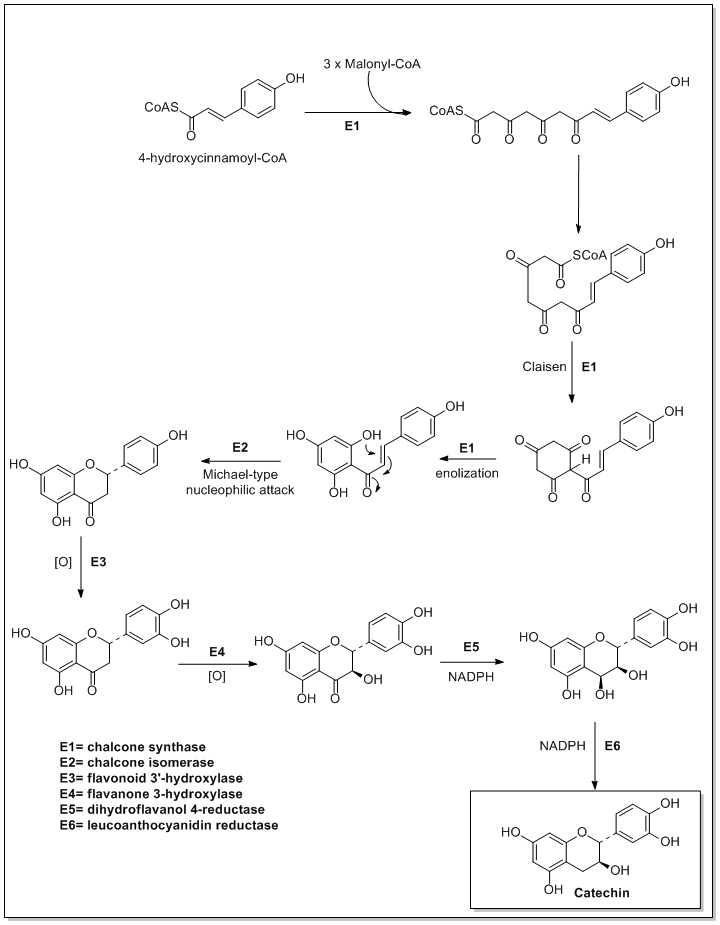
Biosynthesis of catechin

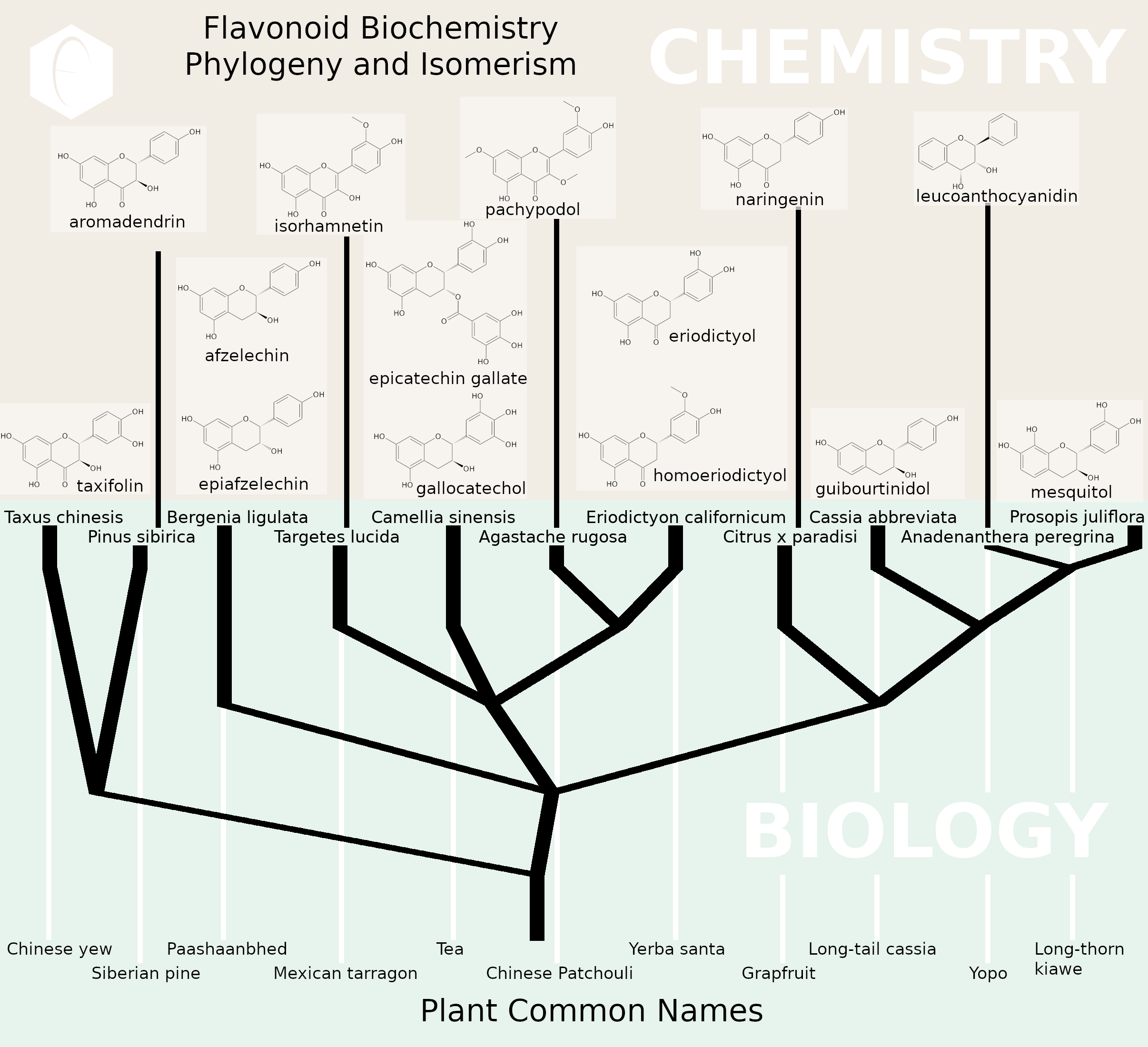
A biochemical diagram showing the class of flavonoids and their source in nature through various inter-related plant species.

Flavanoids can possess chiral carbons. Methods of analysis should take this element into account especially regarding bioactivity or enzyme stereospecificity.

== Enzymes ==
The biosynthesis of flavonoids involves several enzymes.

=== Backbone ===
- 4-Coumaroyl-CoA chalcone (naringenin chalcone)
- Naringenin chalcone flavanone (naringenin).

Path to cyanidin:

- flavanone 3'-hydroxyflavonoid (eriodictyol)
- eriodictyol dihydroflavonol (taxifolin)
- taxifolin leucocyanidin
- leucocyanidin cyanidin

Path to (–)-epicatechin:

- cyanidin (–)-epicatechin

Path to (+)-catechin:

- leucocyanidin (+)-catechin

Path to flavones:

- Flavone synthase

Path to flavonols:

- dihydroflavonol flavonol

Path to 3-deoxyanthocyanidins:

- flavanone flavan-4-ol
- (Process analogous to taxifolin → cyanidin follows)

=== Methylation ===
- Apigenin 4'-O-methyltransferase
- Luteolin O-methyltransferase
- Quercetin 3-O-methyltransferase

=== Glycosylation ===
- Anthocyanidin 3-O-glucosyltransferase
- Flavone 7-O-beta-glucosyltransferase
- Flavone apiosyltransferase
- Flavonol-3-O-glucoside L-rhamnosyltransferase
- Flavonol 3-O-glucosyltransferase

=== Further acetylations ===
- Isoflavone-7-O-beta-glucoside 6"-O-malonyltransferase
