= Flavone synthase =

Identifiers
- EC no.: 1.14.11.22
- CAS no.: 138263-98-6

Databases
- IntEnz: IntEnz view
- BRENDA: BRENDA entry
- ExPASy: NiceZyme view
- KEGG: KEGG entry
- MetaCyc: metabolic pathway
- PRIAM: profile
- PDB structures: RCSB PDB PDBe PDBsum
Search
- PMC: articles
- PubMed: articles
- NCBI: proteins

In enzymology, a flavone synthase (EC 1.14.11.22) is an enzyme that catalyzes the chemical reaction

a flavanone + 2-oxoglutarate + O_{2} $\rightleftharpoons$ a flavone + succinate + CO_{2} + H_{2}O

The 3 substrates of this enzyme are flavanone, 2-oxoglutarate, and O_{2}, whereas its 4 products are flavone, succinate, CO_{2}, and H_{2}O.

This enzyme belongs to the family of oxidoreductases, specifically those acting on paired donors, with O2 as oxidant and incorporation or reduction of oxygen. The oxygen incorporated need not be derived from O2 with 2-oxoglutarate as one donor, and incorporation of one atom o oxygen into each donor. The systematic name of this enzyme class is flavanone,2-oxoglutarate:oxygen oxidoreductase (dehydrating). This enzyme participates in flavonoid biosynthesis and isoflavonoid biosynthesis.
