= 2'-hydroxydaidzein reductase =

Class of enzymes

Identifiers
- EC no.: 1.3.1.51
- CAS no.: 126125-01-7

Databases
- IntEnz: IntEnz view
- BRENDA: BRENDA entry
- ExPASy: NiceZyme view
- KEGG: KEGG entry
- MetaCyc: metabolic pathway
- PRIAM: profile
- PDB structures: RCSB PDB PDBe PDBsum
- Gene Ontology: AmiGO / QuickGO
Search
- PMC: articles
- PubMed: articles
- NCBI: proteins

In enzymology, 2'-hydroxydaidzein reductase (EC 1.3.1.51) is an enzyme that catalyzes the chemical reaction

2'-hydroxydaidzein
+ NADPH
H^{+}
H^{+}
2'-hydroxy-2,3-dihydrodaidzein
+ NADP^{+}

The three substrates of this enzyme are 2'-hydroxydaidzein, reduced nicotinamide adenine dinucleotide phosphate (NADPH), and a proton. Its products are 2'-hydroxy-2,3-dihydrodaidzein and oxidised NADP^{+}.

This enzyme belongs to the family of oxidoreductases, specifically those acting on the CH-CH group of donor with NAD+ or NADP+ as acceptor. The systematic name of this enzyme class is 2'-hydroxy-2,3-dihydrodaidzein:NADP+ 2'-oxidoreductase. Other names in common use include NADPH:2'-hydroxydaidzein oxidoreductase, HDR, and 2'-hydroxydihydrodaidzein:NADP+ 2'-oxidoreductase. This enzyme participates in isoflavonoid biosynthesis.
