= Isoflavonoid =

Class of chemical compound

3-phenylchromen-4-one

3-phenylchroman (isoflavan) backbone of the isoflavanes

Isoflavonoids are a class of flavonoid phenolic compounds, many of which are biologically active. Isoflavonoids and their derivatives are sometimes referred to as phytoestrogens, as many isoflavonoid compounds have biological effects via the estrogen receptor.

Medically, isoflavonoids and related compounds have been used in many dietary supplements but the medical and scientific community is generally skeptical of their use. Recently, some natural isoflavonoids have been identified as toxins, including biliatresone which may cause biliary atresia when infants are exposed to the plant product.

The isoflavonoid group is broad, and includes many structurally similar groups, including:

- isoflavones
- isoflavanones
- isoflavans
- pterocarpans
- rotenoids

Isoflavonoids are derived from the flavonoid biosynthesis pathway via liquiritigenin or naringenin.

== Chemical makeup ==
While flavonoids (in the narrow sense) have the 2-phenylchromen-4-one backbone, isoflavonoids have the 3-phenylchromen-4-one backbone with no hydroxyl group substitution at position 2 (case of the isoflavones) or the 3-phenylchroman (isoflavan) backbone (case of isoflavanes, such as equol).

== See also ==
- Daidzein
- Equol
- Flavonoid
- Genistein
- Glycitein
- Homoisoflavonoids, related molecules with a 16-carbon skeleton
- Isoflavone
