= Wighteone =

Names
- IUPAC name 4′,5,7-Trihydroxy-6-(3-methylbut-2-en-1-yl)isoflavone
- Systematic IUPAC name 5,7-Dihydroxy-3-(4-hydroxyphenyl)-6-(3-methylbut-2-en-1-yl)-4H-1-benzopyran-4-one
- Other names 6-Isopentenylgenistein; 6-Prenyl-5,7,4′-trihydroxyisoflavone

Identifiers
CAS Number	51225-30-0
3D model (JSmol)	Interactive image
ChEBI	CHEBI:10038
ChEMBL	ChEMBL393222
ChemSpider	4445125
PubChem CID	5281814
UNII	48ZS74CB9A
CompTox Dashboard (EPA)	DTXSID30199239
- InChI: InChI=1S/C20H18O5/c1-11(2)3-8-14-16(22)9-17-18(19(14)23)20(24)15(10-25-17)12-4-6-13(21)7-5-12/h3-7,9-10,21-23H,8H2,1-2H3 Key: KIMDVVKVNNSHGZ-UHFFFAOYSA-N; InChI=1/C20H18O5/c1-11(2)3-8-14-16(22)9-17-18(19(14)23)20(24)15(10-25-17)12-4-6-13(21)7-5-12/h3-7,9-10,21-23H,8H2,1-2H3 Key: KIMDVVKVNNSHGZ-UHFFFAOYAL
- SMILES: CC(=CCC1=C(C=C2C(=C1O)C(=O)C(=CO2)C3=CC=C(C=C3)O)O)C

Properties
Chemical formula	C_{20}H_{18}O_{5}
Molar mass	338.359 g·mol^{−1}
- Except where otherwise noted, data are given for materials in their standard state (at 25 °C [77 °F], 100 kPa). verify (what is ?) Infobox references

Wighteone is an isoflavone, a type of flavonoid. It can be found in Maclura aurantiaca, the hedge apple.
