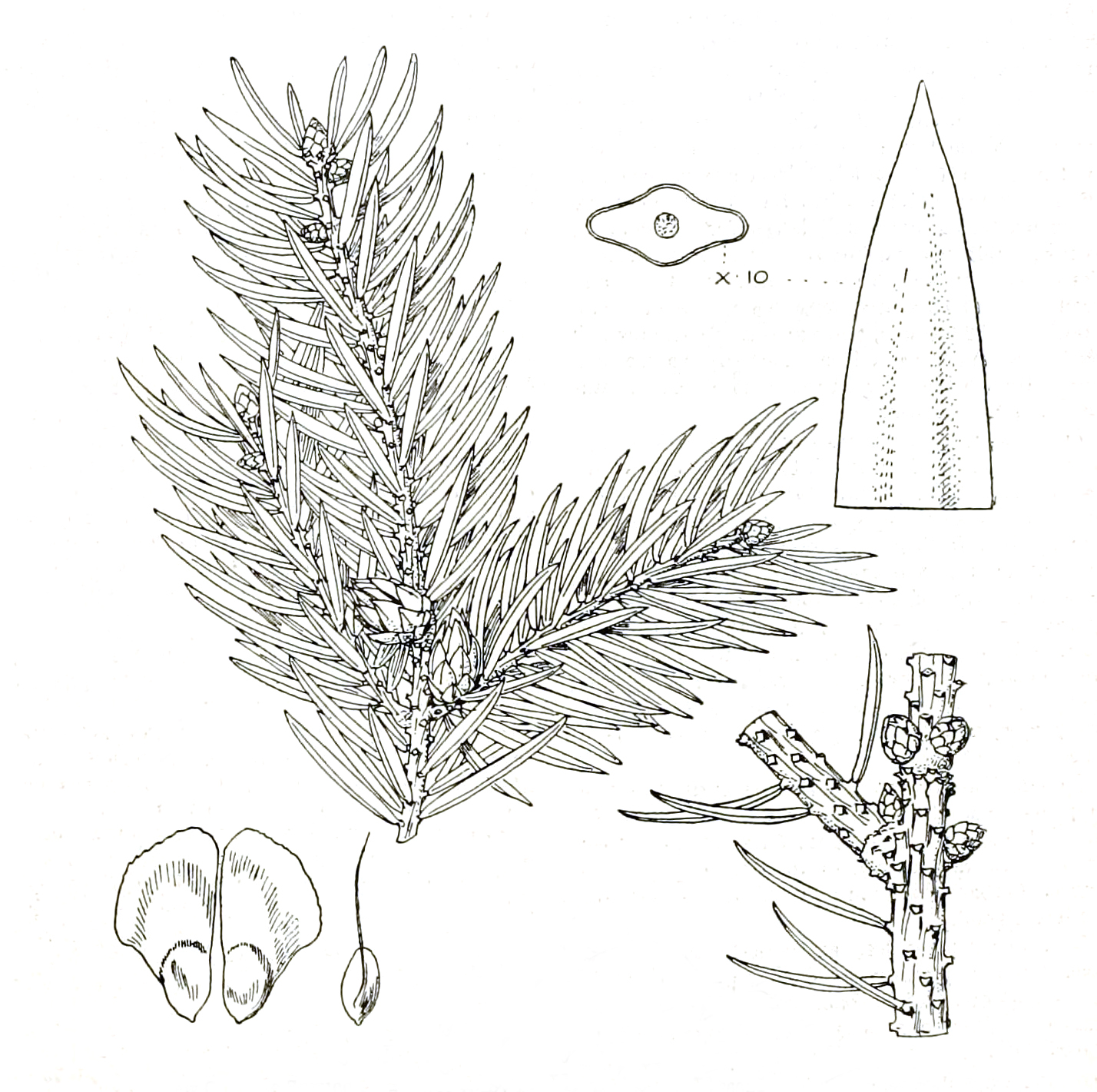

Conservation status
- Critically Endangered (IUCN 3.1)

Scientific classification
- Kingdom: Plantae
- Clade: Tracheophytes
- Clade: Gymnospermae
- Division: Pinophyta
- Class: Pinopsida
- Order: Pinales
- Family: Pinaceae
- Genus: Picea
- Species: P. neoveitchii

Binomial name
- Picea neoveitchii Mast.

= Picea neoveitchii =

Species of conifer

Picea neoveitchii (Chinese: 大果青扦) is a species of conifer in the family Pinaceae. It is found only in China. It is threatened by habitat loss.

Picea neoveitchii is an endemic spruce species of central China. Several scattered communities and individuals can be found growing on the southern slopes of Qinling Mountains in Baotian Man Nature Preserve, Henan province between 1240 and 2020 meters elevation. This spruce species is especially vulnerable to extinction due to the high fragmentation of its natural habitat from human disturbance. Current conservation efforts are focused on preserving natural habitats, managing invasive species to reduce competition, and prohibiting timber harvest. Conservation researchers emphasize the urgent need for a restoration project which reintroduces seedlings across the tree's original range (within protected forest areas), and protects wild communities and individuals. (Zhang et al. 2006).
