= 4',7-Dihydroxy-6-methoxyflavone =

Chemical compound

4′,7-Dihydroxy-6-methoxyflavone

Names
- IUPAC name 4′,7-Dihydroxy-6-methoxyflavone
- Systematic IUPAC name 7-Hydroxy-2-(4-hydroxyphenyl)-6-methoxy-4H-1-benzopyran-4-one

Identifiers
3D model (JSmol)	Interactive image
ChemSpider	74852909
PubChem CID	129866008
- InChI: InChI=1S/C16H12O5/c1-20-16-6-11-12(18)7-14(21-15(11)8-13(16)19)9-2-4-10(17)5-3-9/h2-8,17,19H,1H3 Key: OETSANFHEJPBHW-UHFFFAOYSA-N
- SMILES: O=C1C=C(OC2=CC(O)=C(OC)C=C12)C=3C=CC(O)=CC3

Properties
Chemical formula	C_{16}H_{12}O_{5}
Molar mass	284.267 g·mol^{−1}
- Except where otherwise noted, data are given for materials in their standard state (at 25 °C [77 °F], 100 kPa). Infobox references

4',7-Dihydroxy-6-methoxyflavone is a bioactive O-methylated flavone, a type of flavonoid. It is the 6-O-methylated derivative of 6,7,4'-Trihydroxyflavone, isolated from Iva hayesiana and from Mentha suaveolens.
