= Luteone =

Luteone may refer to:

- Luteone (isoflavone), a prenylated isoflavone found in the pods of Laburnum anagyroides.
- Luteone (terpenoid), a twenty-three carbon terpenoid from the dorid nudibranch Cadlina luteomarginata.
