= Flavonol 3-O-glucosyltransferase =

Class of enzymes

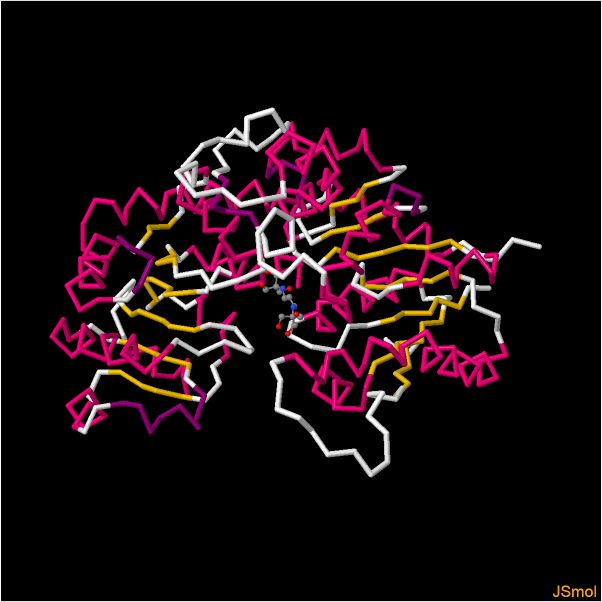

Identifiers
- EC no.: 2.4.1.91
- CAS no.: 50812-18-5

Databases
- BRENDA: enzyme data
- ExPASy: NiceZyme view
- KEGG: enzyme entry
- MetaCyc: metabolic pathway
- Rhea: reactions
- PDB structures: RCSB PDB PDBe PDBsum
- Gene Ontology: AmiGO / QuickGO
Search
- PMC: articles
- PubMed: articles
- NCBI: proteins

Flavonol 3-O-glucosyltransferase (EC 2.4.1.91) is an enzyme that catalyzes the general chemical reaction

UDP-glucose + a flavonol $\rightleftharpoons$ UDP + a flavonol 3-O-beta-D-glucoside

The two substrates of this enzyme are UDP-glucose and a flavonol. Its products are uridine diphosphate (UDP) and the corresponding flavonol 3-O-beta-D-glucoside. The flavonoids that can act as substrates within this reaction include quercetin, kaempferol, dihydrokaempferol, kaempferid, fisetin, and isorhamnetin. Flavonol 3-O-glucosyltransferase is a hexosyl group transfer enzyme.

This enzyme is known by the systematic name UPD-glucose:flavonol 3-O-D glucosyltransferase, and it participates in flavonoid biosynthesis and causes the formation of anthocyanins. Anthocyanins produce a purple color in the plant tissues that they are present in.

== Occurrence ==
Flavonol 3-O-glucosyltransferase is found in grapes (Vitis vinifera), parsley, snapdragons (Antirrhinum majus), kale (Brassica oleracea), tulip bulbs, peony, and grapefruit (Citrus x paradisi).

== Function ==
This enzyme is involved in the biosynthesis of secondary metabolites. The primary function of this enzyme within its pathway is binding a glucoside onto a flavonol molecule, forming a flavonol 3-O-glucoside. For example, it converts quercetin to isoquercetin:

quercetin
+ UDP-glucose
UDP
isoquercetin

A glucose unit is transferred from UDP-glucose to a specific hydroxy group of the flavonol, with uridine diphosphate (UDP) as a byproduct. By the same mechanism, the enzyme converts anthocyanidins to anthocyanins as a part of the phenylpropanoid pathway. For example, pelargonidin is transformed into callistephin (pelargonidin 3-O-glucoside).

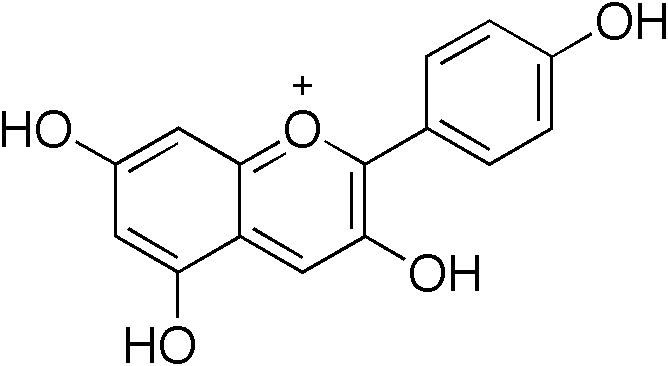
pelargonidin
+ UDP-glucose
UDP
callistephin

This enzyme is also involved in the flavone glycoside pathway, and daphnetin modification in some organisms.

== Nomenclature ==
This enzyme belongs to the family of glycosyltransferases, specifically the hexosyltransferases. The systematic name of this enzyme class is UDP-glucose:flavonol 3-O-D-glucosyltransferase. Other names in common use include:

- GTI,
- uridine diphosphoglucose-flavonol 3-O-glucosyltransferase,
- UDP-glucose:flavonol 3-O-glucosyltransferase, and
- UDP-glucose:flavonoid 3-O-glucosyltransferase (UFGT).

Among those, UFGT is divided into UDP-glucose: Flavonoid 3-O-glucosyltransferase (UF3GT) and UDP-glucose: Flavonoid 5-O-glucosyltransferase (UF5GT), which are responsible for the glucosylation of anthocyanins to produce stable molecules.

== Inhibitors and structure of the enzyme ==
Some of the inhibitors of this enzyme include CaCl_{2}, CoCl_{2}, Cu^{+2}, CuCl_{2}, KCl, Mg^{+2}, and Mn^{+2}. The primary active site residue of this enzyme is Asp181, as determined by studies of how mutations affect enzyme capacity. There are several documentations of the crystalline structure of flavonol 3-O-glucosyltransferase (2C1X, 2C1Z, and 2C9Z), and, based on these renderings of the enzyme, there is only one subunit in the quaternary structure of the molecule.
