= Isoflavone-7-O-beta-glucoside 6"-O-malonyltransferase =

isoflavone-7-O-beta-glucoside 6''-O-malonyltransferase

Identifiers
- EC no.: 2.3.1.115
- CAS no.: 93585-97-8

Databases
- IntEnz: IntEnz view
- BRENDA: BRENDA entry
- ExPASy: NiceZyme view
- KEGG: KEGG entry
- MetaCyc: metabolic pathway
- PRIAM: profile
- PDB structures: RCSB PDB PDBe PDBsum
- Gene Ontology: AmiGO / QuickGO
Search
- PMC: articles
- PubMed: articles
- NCBI: proteins

In enzymology, an isoflavone-7-O-beta-glucoside 6"-O-malonyltransferase (EC 2.3.1.115) is an enzyme that catalyzes the chemical reaction

malonyl-CoA + biochanin A 7-O-beta-D-glucoside $\rightleftharpoons$ CoA + biochanin A 7-O-(6-O-malonyl-beta-D-glucoside)

Thus, the two substrates of this enzyme are malonyl-CoA and biochanin A 7-O-beta-D-glucoside, whereas its two products are CoA and biochanin A 7-O-(6-O-malonyl-beta-D-glucoside).

This enzyme belongs to the family of transferases, specifically those acyltransferases transferring groups other than aminoacyl groups. The systematic name of this enzyme class is malonyl-CoA:isoflavone-7-O-beta-D-glucoside 6"-O-malonyltransferase. Other names in common use include flavone/flavonol 7-O-beta-D-glucoside malonyltransferase, flavone (flavonol) 7-O-glycoside malonyltransferase, malonyl-CoA:flavone/flavonol 7-O-glucoside malonyltransferase, MAT-7, malonyl-coenzyme A:isoflavone 7-O-glucoside-6"-malonyltransferase, and malonyl-coenzyme A:flavone/flavonol-7-O-glycoside malonyltransferase. This enzyme participates in flavonoid biosynthesis and isoflavonoid biosynthesis.
