= Biochanin A =

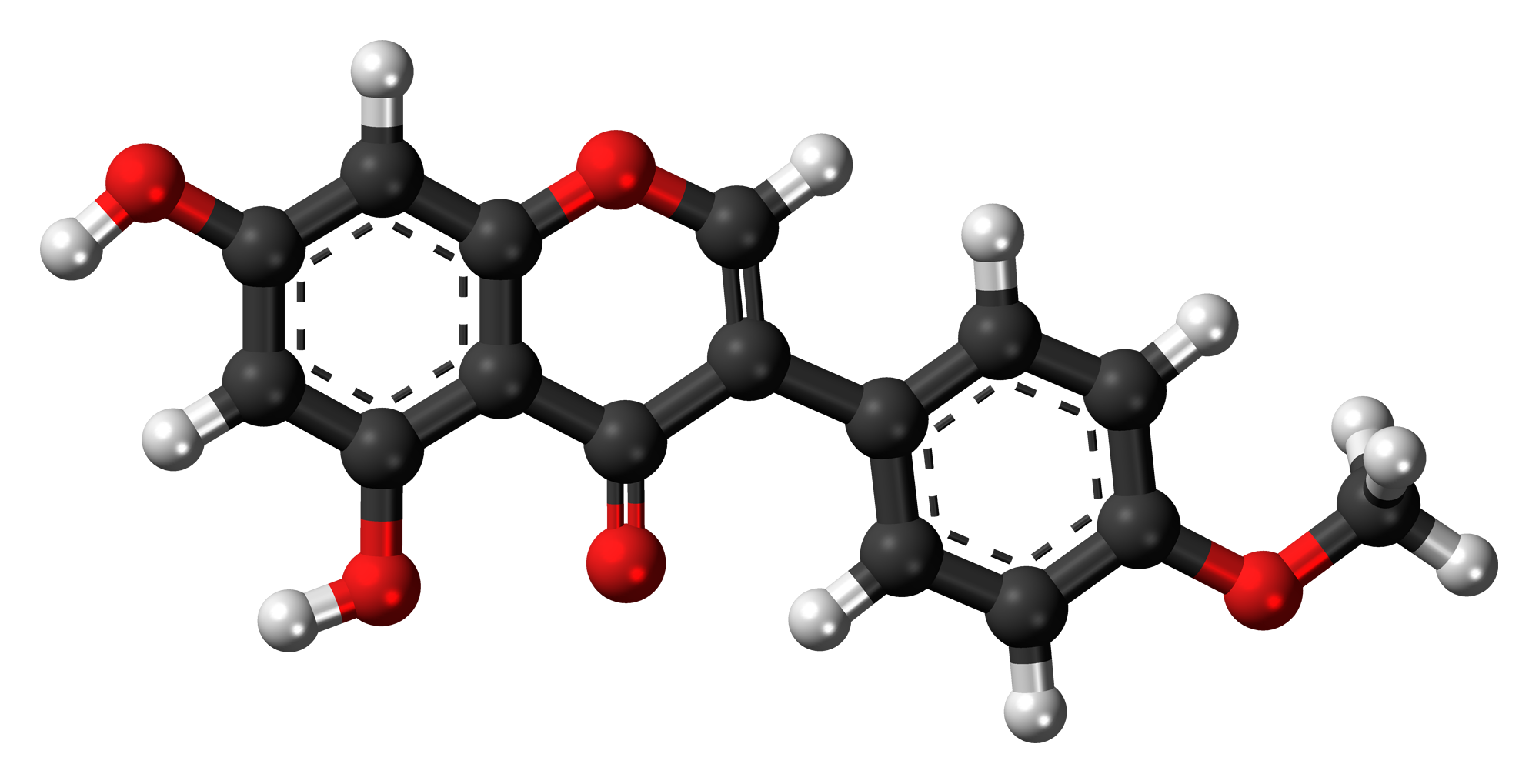

Names
- IUPAC name 5,7-Dihydroxy-4′-methoxyisoflavone
- Systematic IUPAC name 5,7-Dihydroxy-3-(4-methoxyphenyl)-4H-1-benzopyran-4-one
- Other names Biochanin; 4′-Methylgenistein olmelin Biochanine A Biochanin-A; Genistein 4-methyl ether

Identifiers
| CAS Number | 491-80-5 |
| 3D model (JSmol) | Interactive image |
| ChEBI | CHEBI:17574 |
| ChEMBL | ChEMBL131921 |
| ChemSpider | 4444068 |
| ECHA InfoCard | 100.007.041 |
| IUPHAR/BPS | 2829 |
| KEGG | C00814 |
| PubChem CID | 5280373 |
| UNII | U13J6U390T |
| CompTox Dashboard (EPA) | DTXSID1022394 |
- InChI: InChI=1S/C16H12O5/c1-20-11-4-2-9(3-5-11)12-8-21-14-7-10(17)6-13(18)15(14)16(12)19/h2-8,17-18H,1H3 Key: WUADCCWRTIWANL-UHFFFAOYSA-N; InChI=1/C16H12O5/c1-20-11-4-2-9(3-5-11)12-8-21-14-7-10(17)6-13(18)15(14)16(12)19/h2-8,17-18H,1H3 Key: WUADCCWRTIWANL-UHFFFAOYAM
- SMILES: O=C\1c3c(O/C=C/1c2ccc(OC)cc2)cc(O)cc3O

Properties
| Chemical formula | C_{16}H_{12}O_{5} |
| Molar mass | 284.267 g·mol^{−1} |
- Except where otherwise noted, data are given for materials in their standard state (at 25 °C [77 °F], 100 kPa). verify (what is ?) Infobox references

Biochanin A is an O-methylated isoflavone. It is a natural organic compound in the class of phytochemicals known as flavonoids. Biochanin A can be found in red clover in soy, in alfalfa sprouts, in peanuts, in chickpea (Cicer arietinum) and in other legumes.

Biochanin A is classified as a phytoestrogen. It has also been found to be a weak inhibitor of fatty acid amide hydrolase in vitro.

== Metabolism ==
The enzyme biochanin-A reductase converts biochanin A to 2,3-dihydrobiochanin A using nicotinamide adenine dinucleotide phosphate (NADPH) as its cofactor.

biochanin A
+ NADPH
H^{+}
H^{+}
2,3-dihydrobiochanin A
+ NADP^{+}

The enzyme isoflavone-7-O-beta-glucoside 6"-O-malonyltransferase uses malonyl-CoA and biochanin A 7-O-β-D-glucoside to produce CoA and biochanin A 7-O-(6-O-malonyl-β-D-glucoside).

== See also ==
- List of phytochemicals in food
- Prunetin
