= Daidzein =

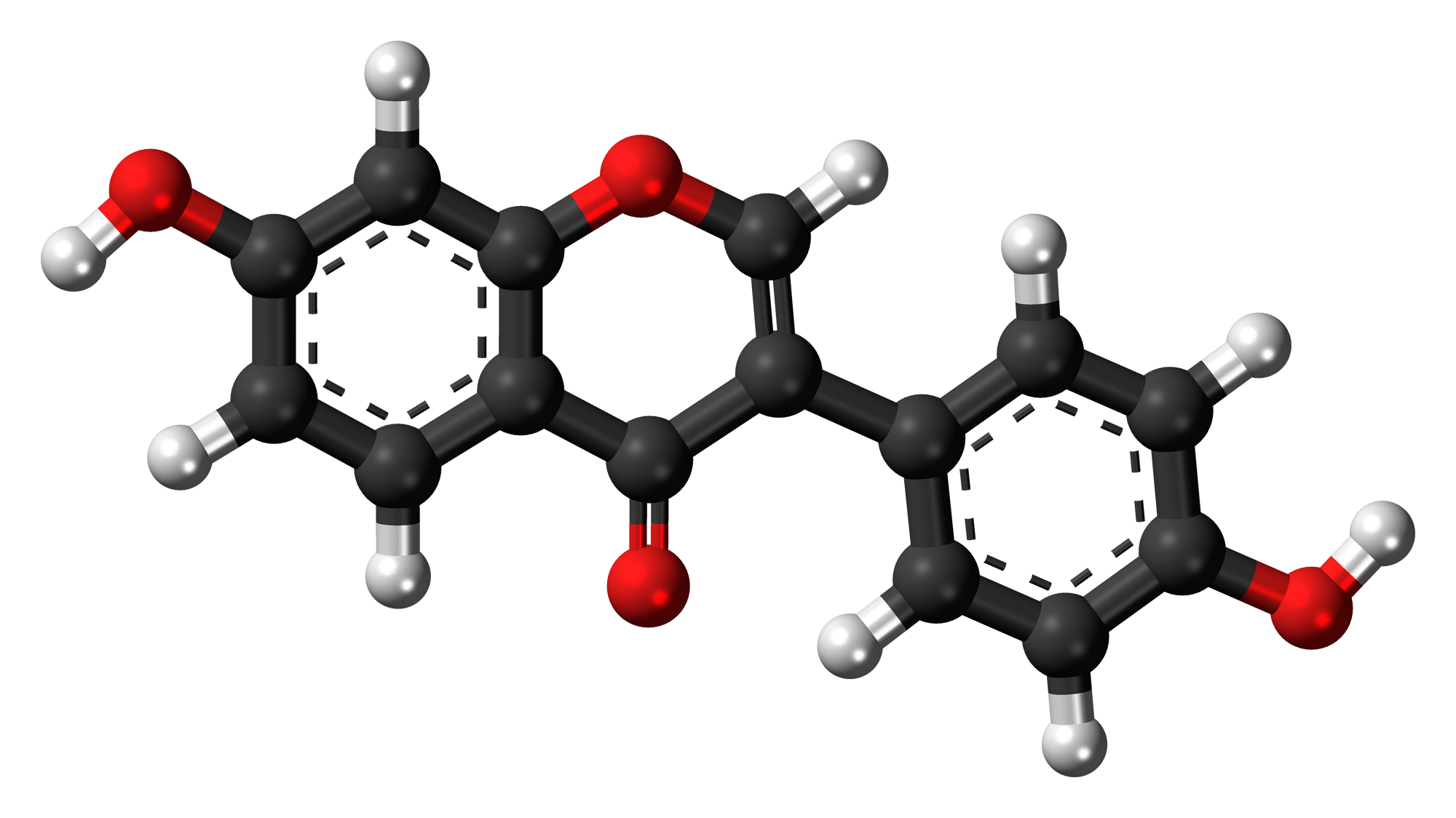

Names
- IUPAC name 4′,7-Dihydroxyisoflavone
- Systematic IUPAC name 7-Hydroxy-3-(4-hydroxyphenyl)-4H-1-benzopyran-4-one
- Other names 7-Hydroxy-3-(4-hydroxyphenyl)chromen-4-one; Daidzeol; Isoaurostatin

Identifiers
CAS Number	486-66-8
3D model (JSmol)	Interactive image
ChEBI	CHEBI:28197
ChEMBL	ChEMBL8145
ChemSpider	4445025
ECHA InfoCard	100.006.942
IUPHAR/BPS	2828
KEGG	C10208
PubChem CID	5281708
UNII	6287WC5J2L
CompTox Dashboard (EPA)	DTXSID9022310
- InChI: InChI=1S/C15H10O4/c16-10-3-1-9(2-4-10)13-8-19-14-7-11(17)5-6-12(14)15(13)18/h1-8,16-17H Key: ZQSIJRDFPHDXIC-UHFFFAOYSA-N; InChI=1/C15H10O4/c16-10-3-1-9(2-4-10)13-8-19-14-7-11(17)5-6-12(14)15(13)18/h1-8,16-17H Key: ZQSIJRDFPHDXIC-UHFFFAOYAG
- SMILES: O=C\1c3c(O/C=C/1c2ccc(O)cc2)cc(O)cc3

Properties
Chemical formula	C_{15}H_{10}O_{4}
Molar mass	254.241 g·mol^{−1}
Appearance	Pale yellow prisms
Melting point	315 to 323 °C (599 to 613 °F; 588 to 596 K) (decomposes)
- Except where otherwise noted, data are given for materials in their standard state (at 25 °C [77 °F], 100 kPa). verify (what is ?) Infobox references

Daidzein (7-hydroxy-3-(4-hydroxyphenyl)-4H-chromen-4-one) is a naturally occurring compound found exclusively in soybeans and other legumes, and structurally belongs to a class of compounds known as isoflavones. Daidzein and other isoflavones are produced in plants through the phenylpropanoid pathway of secondary metabolism and are used as signal carriers, and defense responses to pathogenic attacks. Upon consumption of isoflavone-rich foods, daidzein has poor bioavailability and low water solubility.

== Natural occurrence ==
Daidzein and other isoflavone compounds, such as genistein, are present in a number of plants and herbs like kwao krua (Pueraria mirifica) and kudzu. It can also be found in Maackia amurensis cell cultures. Daidzein can be found in food such as mature soybeans and soy products like soy protein concentrate, tofu and textured vegetable protein.

Total isoflavones in soybeans are—in general—37 percent daidzein, 57 percent genistein and 6 percent glycitein, according to USDA data. Soy germ contains 41.7 percent daidzein.

== Biosynthesis ==
=== History ===
The isoflavonoid pathway has long been studied because of its prevalence in a wide variety of plant species, including as pigmentation in many flowers, as well as serving as signals in plants and microbes. The isoflavone synthase (IFS) enzyme was suggested to be a P-450 oxygenase family, and this was confirmed by Shinichi Ayabe's laboratory in 1999. IFS exists in two isoforms that can use both liquiritigenin and naringenin to give daidzein and genistein respectively.

=== Pathway ===
Daidzein is an isoflavonoid derived from the shikimate pathway that forms an oxygen containing heterocycle through a cytochrome P-450-dependent enzyme that is NADPH dependent.

The biosynthesis of daidzein begins with L-phenylalanine and undergoes a general phenylpropanoid metabolic pathway where the shikimate derived aromatic ring is shifted to the adjacent carbon of the heterocycle. The process begins with phenylalanine ligase (PAL) cleaving the amino group from L-Phe forming the unsaturated carboxylic acid, cinnamic acid. Cinnamic acid is then hydroxylated by membrane protein cinnamate-4-hydroxylase (C4H) to form p-coumaric acid. P-coumaric acid then acts as the starter unit which gets loaded with coenzyme A by 4-coumaroyl:CoA-ligase (4CL). The starter unit (A) then undergoes three iterations of malonyl-CoA resulting in (B), which enzymes chalcone synthase (CHS) and chalcone reductase (CHR) modify to obtain trihydroxychalcone. CHR is NADPH dependent. Chalcone isomerase (CHI) then isomerizes trihydroxychalcone to liquiritigenin, the precursor to daidzein.

A radical mechanism has been proposed in order to obtain daidzein from liquiritigenin, where an iron-containing enzyme, as well as NADPH and oxygen cofactors are used by a 2-hydroxyisoflavone synthase to oxidize liquiritigenin to a radical intermediate (C). A 1,2 aryl migration follows to form (D), which is subsequently oxidized to (E). Lastly, dehydration of the hydroxy group on C2 occurs through a 2-hydroxyisoflavanone dehydratase (specifically GmHID1) to give daidzein.

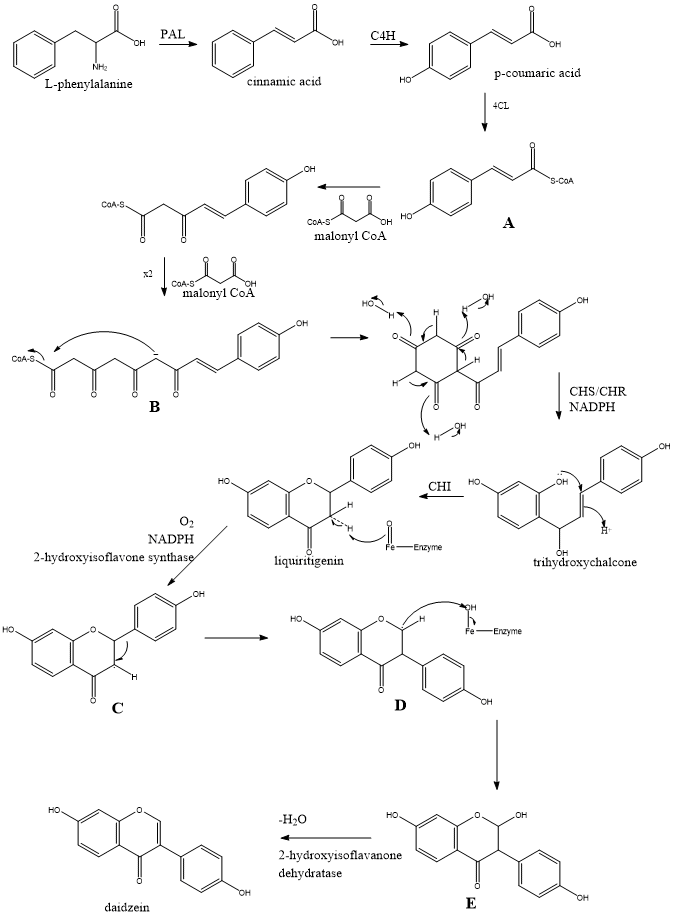
Daidzein biosynthesis

== Research ==
There is preliminary evidence that consuming soy foods rich in daidzein and isoflavones may improve cardiovascular function in postmenopausal women and lower the risk of breast cancer in premenopausal and postmenopausal women.

== Pathogen interactions ==
Because daidzein is a defensive factor, Pseudomonas syringae produces the HopZ1b effector which degrades a GmHID1 product.

== Derivatives ==
- Glyceollin, a type of phytoalexin

=== Glycosides ===
- Daidzin is the 7-O-glucoside of daidzein.
- Puerarin is the 8-C-glucoside of daidzein.

== Plants containing daidzein ==
- Maackia amurensis
- Pueraria montana var. lobata
- Pueraria thomsonii
