= Genistein =

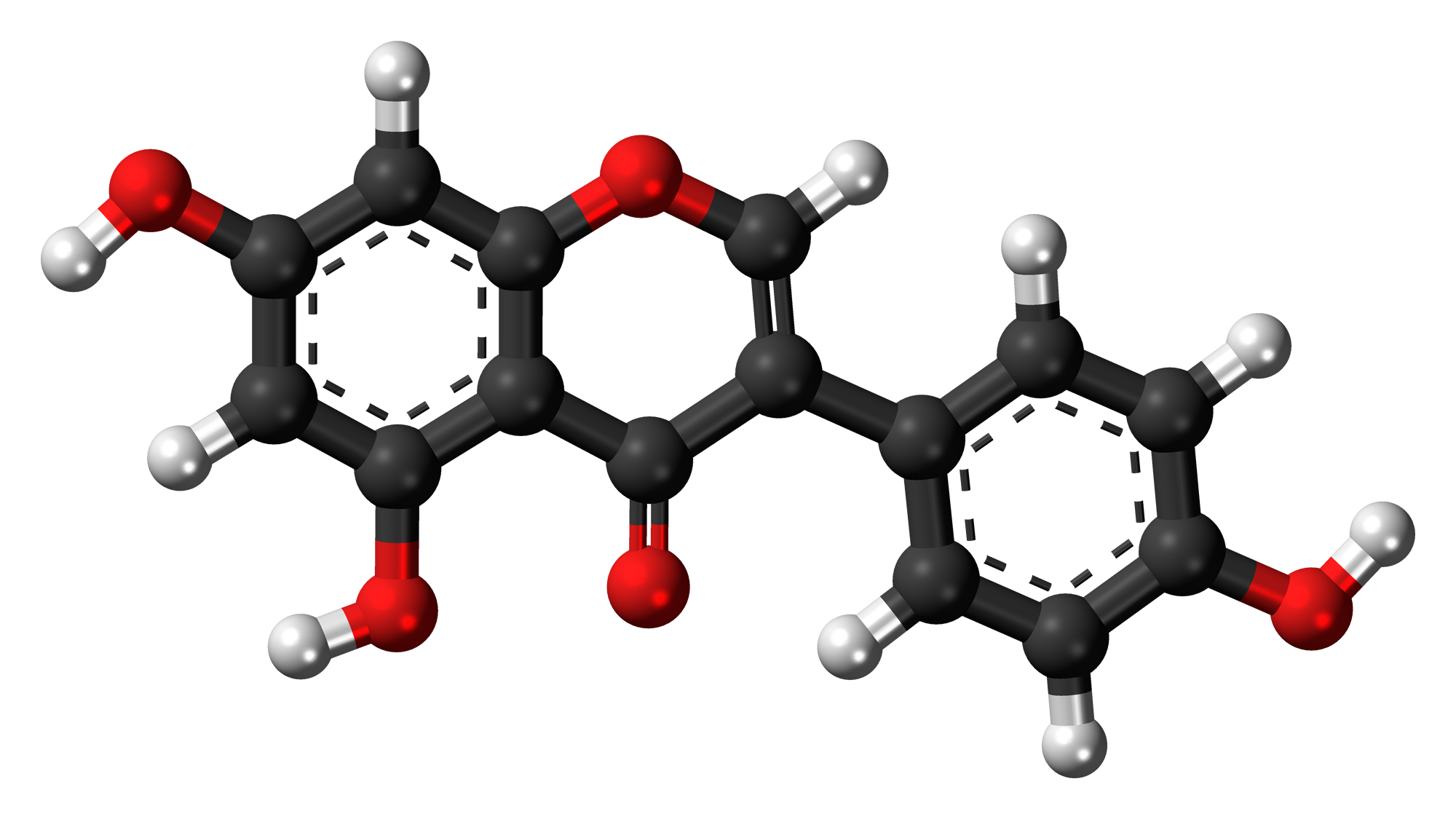

Names
- IUPAC name 4′,5,7-Trihydroxyisoflavone
- Systematic IUPAC name 5,7-Dihydroxy-3-(4-hydroxyphenyl)-4H-1-benzopyran-4-one

Identifiers
CAS Number	446-72-0
3D model (JSmol)	Interactive image
Beilstein Reference	263823
ChEBI	CHEBI:28088
ChEMBL	ChEMBL44
ChemSpider	4444448
DrugBank	DB01645
ECHA InfoCard	100.006.524
EC Number	207-174-9
IUPHAR/BPS	2826
KEGG	D11680; C06563
PubChem CID	5280961
UNII	DH2M523P0H
CompTox Dashboard (EPA)	DTXSID5022308
- InChI: InChI=1S/C15H10O5/c16-9-3-1-8(2-4-9)11-7-20-13-6-10(17)5-12(18)14(13)15(11)19/h1-7,16-18H Key: TZBJGXHYKVUXJN-UHFFFAOYSA-N; InChI=1/C15H10O5/c16-9-3-1-8(2-4-9)11-7-20-13-6-10(17)5-12(18)14(13)15(11)19/h1-7,16-18H Key: TZBJGXHYKVUXJN-UHFFFAOYAH
- SMILES: Oc1ccc(cc1)C\3=C\Oc2cc(O)cc(O)c2C/3=O

Properties
Chemical formula	C_{15}H_{10}O_{5}
Molar mass	270.240 g·mol^{−1}
- Except where otherwise noted, data are given for materials in their standard state (at 25 °C [77 °F], 100 kPa). verify (what is ?) Infobox references

Genistein (C_{15}H_{10}O_{5}) is a plant-derived, aglycone isoflavone. Genistein has the highest content of all isoflavones in soybeans and soy products, such as tempeh. As a type of phytoestrogen, genistein is classed as an endocrine disrupting chemical due to its estrogenic activity in vitro and in vivo. Consequently, excessive consumption of soy products has been linked to disruption of the reproductive organs, such as the uterus, breast, and testis.

It was first isolated in 1899 from the dyer's broom, Genista tinctoria; hence, the chemical name. The compound structure was established in 1926, when it was found to be identical with that of prunetol. It was chemically synthesized in 1928. Genistein is a primary secondary metabolite of the Trifolium species and Glycine max (soy).

== Natural occurrence ==
Isoflavones, such as genistein and daidzein, occur in soybeans and various other plants, including lupin, fava beans, kudzu, psoralea, Flemingia vestita, and coffee. It is present in red clover.

== In soybean products ==
Isoflavone intake from consuming soy products may be as high as 50 mg per day in Asian cuisines, and is increasing in western culture with the shift to vegan and vegetarian diet culture. Genistein has the highest percentage among isoflavones in various soy foods, such as protein concentrate, mature soybeans, and tempeh. It is also prevalent in soy formula which is a suitable alternative to mammalian breast milk.

Dietary supplements and infant formulas containing isoflavone extracts are marketed in some countries.

== Biosynthesis ==
Genistein is an isoflavone, which are isomers of the large group of plant metabolites called flavones. Its biosynthesis begins in a phenylpropanoid metabolic pathway from the amino acid phenylalanine. After several steps, the intermediate flavanone, naringenin, is formed. It can undergo a rearrangement reaction which converts it first to the unstable hydroxlated isoflavanone, which loses water to give the isoflavone. The enzymes involved are isoflavonoid synthase and 2-hydroxyisoflavanone dehydratase.

naringenin
Synthase
2,4',5,7-
tetrahydroxyisoflavanone
Dehydratase
H_{2}O
genistein

== Metabolism, bioavailability, and safety ==
Pharmacokinetics studies indicate that genistein blood concentrations peak about 6 hours after a meal containing isoflavones, which are hydrolized in the small intestine and colon.

The colonic microbiota during digestion influences the metabolism of genistein and other isoflavones, converting them to metabolites having potential biological effects, such as the extent of estrogenic activity.

Although soy products are generally recognized as safe (GRAS), a GRAS determination specifically for genistein has not been reported.

== Potential for estrogenic activity ==
Because soy isoflavones have similar chemical structure to 17-β-estradiol, the potential for genistein as an estrogenic (hormone-like) signaling molecule that binds to estrogen receptors within cells, mimicking the action of estrogen, has been the subject of research. Estrogenic effects by genistein may affect the risk of hormone-associated cancers in reproductive tissues, such as the breast, uterus, testis, or prostate gland, while it may also influence bone density and levels of blood lipids.

Fetal exposure to 10 mg/kg/day of genistein in rats, believed to be comparable to potential exposure of human infants fed with soy formula, in combination with Di-(2-Ethylhexyl) Phthalate used to produce PVC, led to altered gene and protein expression in neonate and to reduce anogenital distance, a marker of an endocrine disrupting chemical; this effect is more commonly associated with anti-androgens rather than estrogenic compounds.

== Human research ==
Although the potential for genistein to have diverse biological activity in humans has been extensively studied, there is only limited evidence of its specific effects.

In a 2011-12 analysis, a scientific panel for the European Food Safety Authority found that there was no evidence for a cause-and-effect relationship between the consumption of genistein with other soy isoflavones and 1) protection of DNA, proteins and lipids from oxidative damage, 2) maintenance of normal blood LDL-cholesterol concentrations, 3) changes in vascular function associated with menopause, 4) normal hair growth or 5) bone mineral density. The panel further concluded that there was insufficient evidence that soy isoflavones could affect normal skin tone, respiratory functions, cardiovascular health, or prostate cancer.

There is preliminary evidence that consuming soy foods rich in genistein and isoflavones may improve cardiovascular function in postmenopausal women and lower the risk of breast cancer in premenopausal and postmenopausal women. Some studies indicate that supplementation with genistein and soy isoflavones may reduce hot flashes and night sweats during menopause, while there is insufficient evidence for an effect on osteoporosis and cognitive function.

== Laboratory research ==
In vitro, genistein is an agonist of the G protein-coupled estrogen receptor, and binds to and activates all three peroxisome proliferator-activated receptor isoforms, α, δ, and γ. Genistein is a tyrosine kinase inhibitor, mostly of epidermal growth factor receptors.

=== Anthelmintic ===
The root-tuber peel extract of Flemingia vestita is a traditional medicine anthelmintic of the Khasi tribes of India. In research, genistein was found to be the major isoflavone responsible for a deworming property. Genistein was subsequently demonstrated to be effective against intestinal parasites, such as the poultry cestode Raillietina echinobothrida, the pork trematode Fasciolopsis buski, and the sheep liver fluke Fasciola hepatica. It exerts its anthelmintic activity by inhibiting enzymes of glycolysis and glycogenolysis in the parasites.

== Related compounds ==
- Genistin is the 7-O-beta-D-glucoside of genistein.
- Wighteone can be described as 6-isopentenyl genistein

== See also ==
- (S)-Equol
- Liquiritigenin
- Menerba
