= Glycitein =

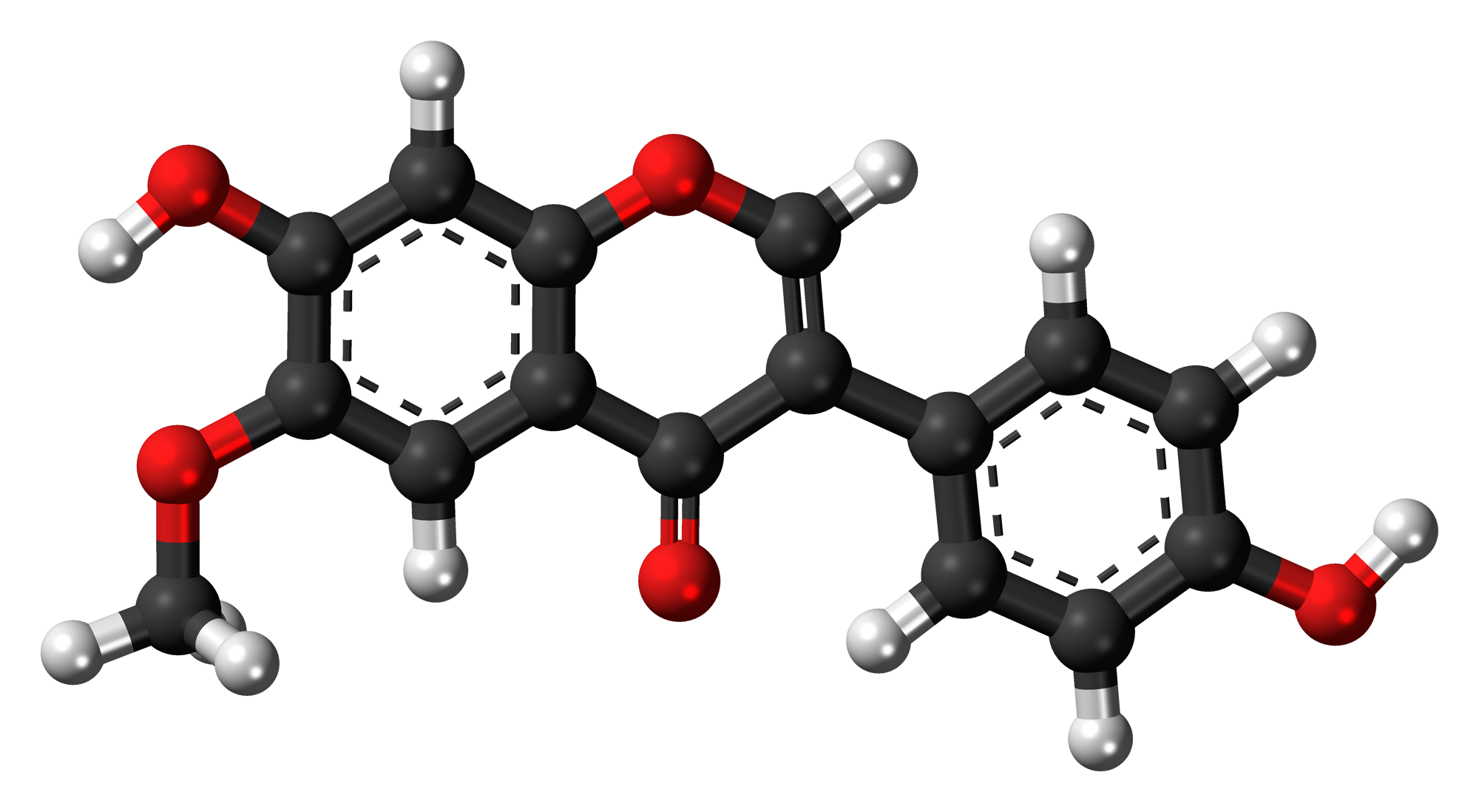

Names
- IUPAC name 4′,7-Dihydroxy-6-methoxyisoflavone
- Systematic IUPAC name 7-Hydroxy-3-(4-hydroxyphenyl)-6-methoxy-4H-1-benzopyran-4-one

Identifiers
CAS Number	40957-83-3
3D model (JSmol)	Interactive image
ChEBI	CHEBI:34778
ChEMBL	ChEMBL513024
ChemSpider	4476508
KEGG	C14536
PubChem CID	5317750
UNII	92M5F28TVF
CompTox Dashboard (EPA)	DTXSID40193960
- InChI: InChI=1S/C16H12O5/c1-20-15-6-11-14(7-13(15)18)21-8-12(16(11)19)9-2-4-10(17)5-3-9/h2-8,17-18H,1H3 Key: DXYUAIFZCFRPTH-UHFFFAOYSA-N; InChI=1/C16H12O5/c1-20-15-6-11-14(7-13(15)18)21-8-12(16(11)19)9-2-4-10(17)5-3-9/h2-8,17-18H,1H3 Key: DXYUAIFZCFRPTH-UHFFFAOYAM
- SMILES: COC1=C(C=C2C(=C1)C(=O)C(=CO2)C3=CC=C(C=C3)O)O

Properties
Chemical formula	C_{16}H_{12}O_{5}
Molar mass	284.267 g·mol^{−1}
- Except where otherwise noted, data are given for materials in their standard state (at 25 °C [77 °F], 100 kPa). verify (what is ?) Infobox references

Glycitein is an O-methylated isoflavone which accounts for 5-10% of the total isoflavones in soy food products. Glycitein is a phytoestrogen with weak estrogenic activity, comparable to that of the other soy isoflavones. Like other isoflavonoids, glycitein is synthesized as a glycoside conjugate to a monosaccharide (typically glucose). The glycoside is hydrolyzed during digestion to the biologically-active free isoflavonoid.

Glycitein is synthesized from phenylalanine, similarly to other isoflavonoids. The biosynthesis involves 8 steps, resulting in free glycitein; a subsequent glucosyltransferase-catalyzed reaction results in the corresponding glucoside, glycitin. This product may be further malonylated to malonylglycitin.

Glycitein has been investigated for its benefits to human health. It binds to the human estrogen receptor (as do other isoflavonoids), and while it does so with lower affinity than other isoflavonoids, it is thought to be overall more potent as an estrogen receptor agonist due to its high bioavailability and its breakdown into further estrogenic products. The estrogenic activity of glycitein is thought to underlie its suppression of oxidative stress and its promotion of decreased blood pressure, though other mechanisms are likely also involved.
