= Isoflavone =

Class of chemical compounds

Isoflavones are a type of naturally occurring isoflavonoids, many of which act as phytoestrogens in mammals. Isoflavones occur in many plant species, but are especially high in soybeans.

Although isoflavones and closely related phytoestrogens are sold as dietary supplements, there is little scientific evidence for either the safety of long-term supplementation or of health benefits from these compounds. Some studies indicate that isoflavone supplementation may help lower the risk of hormone-related cancers.

== Organic chemistry and biosynthesis ==
Isoflavone is an isomer of flavone, which is chromone substituted with a phenyl group in the 2-position. In isoflavone, the phenyl group is in the 3-position.

Substituted isoflavone derivatives are related to the parent by the replacement of two or three hydrogen atoms with hydroxyl groups.

Isoflavone, numbering. Genistein (5-OH, 7-OH, 4'-OH) or daidzein (7-OH, 4'-OH) are e. g. members of the isoflavone family.

Isoflavone differs from flavone (2-phenyl-4H-1-benzopyr-4-one) in location of the phenyl group.

Isoflavones are produced via a branch of the general phenylpropanoid pathway that produces flavonoid compounds in higher plants. Soybeans are the most common source of isoflavones in human food; the major isoflavones in soybean are genistein and daidzein. The phenylpropanoid pathway begins from the amino acid phenylalanine, and an intermediate of the pathway, naringenin, is sequentially converted into the isoflavone genistein by two legume-specific enzymes, isoflavone synthase, and a dehydratase. Similarly, another intermediate naringenin chalcone is converted to the isoflavone daidzein by sequential action of three legume-specific enzymes: chalcone reductase, type II chalcone isomerase, and isoflavone synthase. Plants use isoflavones and their derivatives as phytoalexin compounds to ward off disease-causing pathogenic fungi and other microbes. In addition, soybean uses isoflavones to stimulate soil-microbe rhizobium to form nitrogen-fixing root nodules.

== Occurrence ==
Most members of the family Fabaceae contain significant quantities of isoflavones. Analysis of levels in various species has found the highest levels of genistein and daidzein in psoralea (Psoralea corylifolia). Various legumes including soybean (Glycine max L.), green bean (Phaseolus vulgaris L.), alfalfa sprout (Medicago sativa L.), mung bean sprout (Vigna radiata L.), cowpea (Vigna unguiculata L.), kudzu root (Pueraria lobata L.), and red clover blossom and red clover sprout (Trifolium pratense L.) have been studied for their estrogenic activity. Highly processed foods made from legumes, such as tofu, retain most of their isoflavone content, and fermented miso, which has increased levels.

Soy milk has a much higher concentration of isoflavones than soy sauce, but fermented soybeans show considerably higher concentrations, with tempeh having the highest isoflavone content.

Other dietary sources of isoflavones include chick pea (biochanin A), alfalfa (formononetin), and peanut (genistein). Isoflavones are also found in foods of animal origin such as dairy products, meat, eggs and seafood, but the overall contribution to total intake is low. In countries using the chorleywood bread process, such as in the UK, bread is a source of isoflavones from soy.

In plant tissue, they most often occur as glycosides or their respective malonates or acetyl conjugates, rendering them even more water-soluble (see isoflavone-7-O-beta-glucoside 6"-O-malonyltransferase). The latter forms are unstable and are transformed, e.g. by decarboxylation. Often when leguminose plants are challenged with viral or fungal infections, the water-soluble transport forms are hydrolyzed to the respective aglycones at the target site.

== Research ==
The consumption of isoflavones-rich food or dietary supplements is under preliminary research for its potential association with lower rates of postmenopausal cancer and osteoporosis in women. Use of soy isoflavone dietary supplements may be associated with reduction of hot flashes in postmenopausal women. Soy isoflavones can act as substrates for thyroid peroxidase, thereby competitively inhibiting thyroid hormone production.

Despite the frequent use of isoflavone supplements, there are insufficient data on safety and adverse effects. Isoflavones have GRAS status in the United States. In a risk assessment of isoflavone supplements for post-menopausal women, the European Food Safety Authority found no adverse effects with intakes up to 150 mg/d, although it criticized the lack of data.

== See also ==
- Equol
- Glycitein
- Isoflavonoid
- Phytochemical
- Rotenoids
