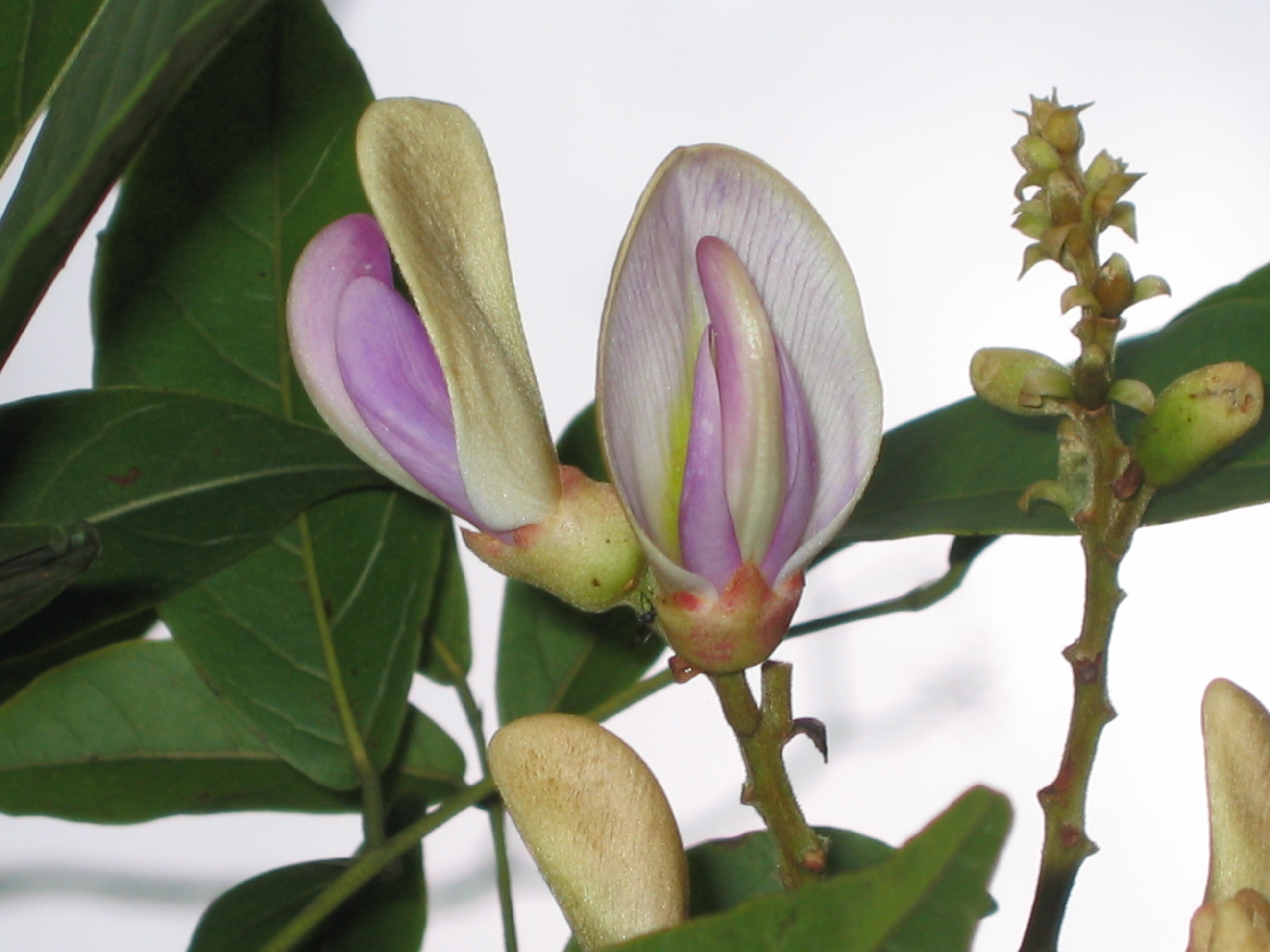
- In cultivation in Hong Kong

Scientific classification
- Kingdom: Plantae
- Clade: Tracheophytes
- Clade: Angiosperms
- Clade: Eudicots
- Clade: Rosids
- Order: Fabales
- Family: Fabaceae
- Subfamily: Faboideae
- Genus: Callerya
- Species: C. nitida

Binomial name
- Callerya nitida (Benth.) R.Geesink

Synonyms
- Callerya tomentosa (Vogel) Endl. ex Walp.; Canavalia taiwaniana S.S.Ying; Marquartia tomentosa Vogel; Millettia kueichouensis Hu; Millettia nitida Benth.; Phaseoloides nitidum (Benth.) Kuntze

= Callerya nitida =

Species of plant

Callerya nitida is a species of flowering plant in the family Fabaceae, native to south-central and southeast mainland China, Hainan and Taiwan. It was first described by George Bentham in 1842 as Millettia nitida.

Callerya nitida produces a number of compounds among which genistein-8-C-β-D-apiofuranosyl-(1→6)-O-β-D-glucopyranoside, calycosin, isoliquiritigenin, formononetin, gliricidin, 8-O-methylretusin, dihydrokaempferol, biochanin, afromosin and hirsutissimiside F interact with thrombin, while sphaerobioside, formononetin-7-O-β-D-apiofuranosyl-(1→6)-O-β-d-glucopyranoside, genistein-5-methylether-7-O-α-L-rhamnopyranosyl-(1→6)-O-β-D-glucopyranoside, retusin-7,8-O-β-D-diglucopyranoside, symplocoside, ononin, genistin, afromosin-7-O-β-D-glucopyranoside, lanceolarin, liquiritigenin, 7,2-dihydroxy,4-methoxyisoflavan and sphaerobioside have no binding to thrombin.
