= Retusin =

Retusin may refer to:

- Retusin (flavonol) (or quercetin-3,7,3',4'-tetramethyl ether, CAS number 1245-15-4)
- Retusin (isoflavone) (or 7,8-dihydroxy-4′-methoxyisoflavone, CAS number 37816-19-6)
