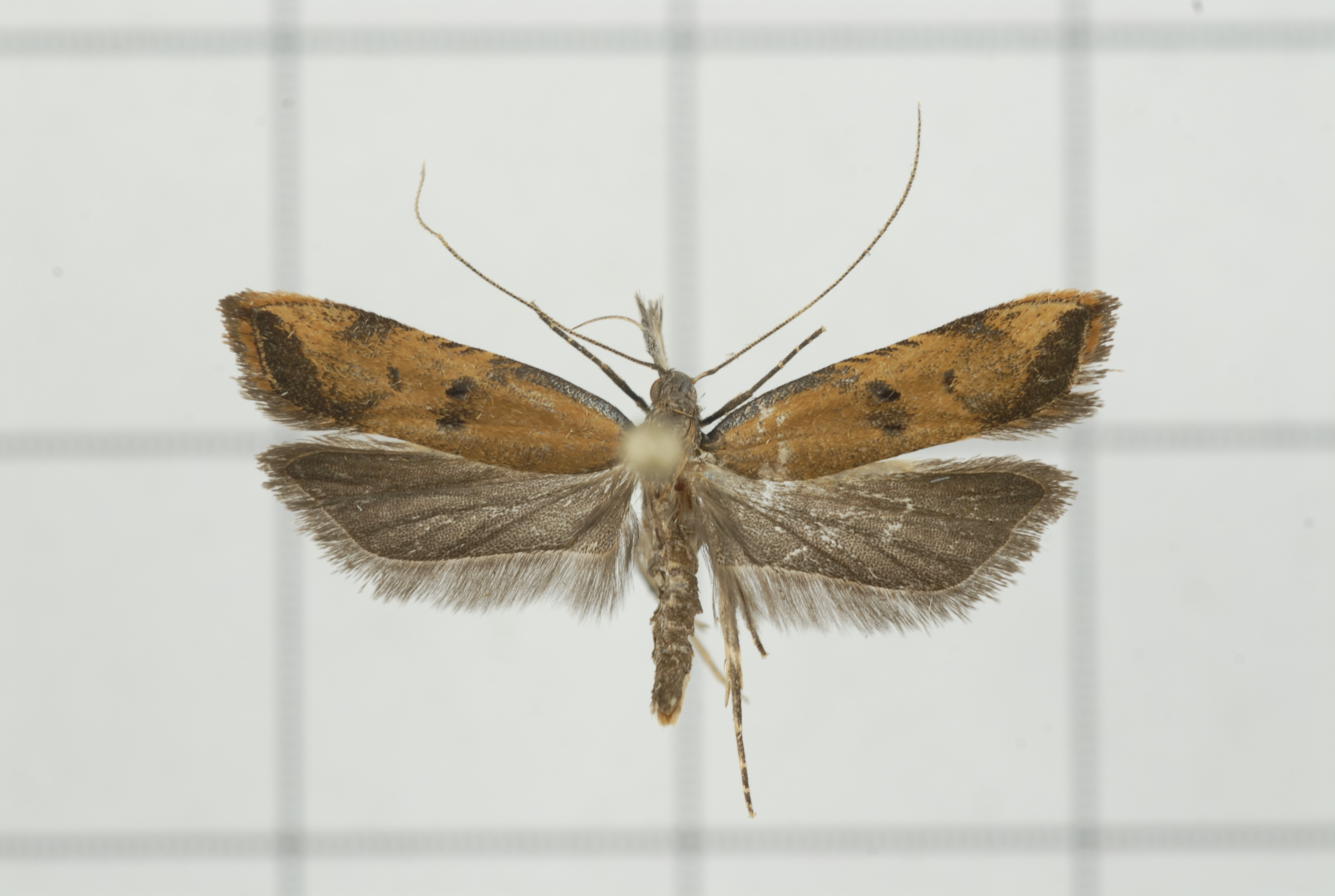

Scientific classification
- Kingdom: Animalia
- Phylum: Arthropoda
- Class: Insecta
- Order: Lepidoptera
- Family: Gelechiidae
- Genus: Dichomeris
- Species: D. fuscalis

Binomial name
- Dichomeris fuscalis Park & Hodges, 1995

= Dichomeris fuscalis =

Species of moth

Dichomeris fuscalis is a moth in the family Gelechiidae. It was described by Kyu-Tek Park and Ronald W. Hodges in 1995. It is found in Taiwan and Hong Kong.

The length of the forewings is 8–8.5 mm; the wingspan is 16–17 mm.

The larvae feed on Wisteria and Millettia nida (=Callerya nitida, formerly Millettia nitida?)
