= Isoflavone 3'-hydroxylase =

Class of enzymes

Identifiers
- EC no.: 1.14.14.88
- CAS no.: 110183-50-1

Databases
- IntEnz: IntEnz view
- BRENDA: BRENDA entry
- ExPASy: NiceZyme view
- KEGG: KEGG entry
- MetaCyc: metabolic pathway
- PRIAM: profile
- PDB structures: RCSB PDB PDBe PDBsum
- Gene Ontology: AmiGO / QuickGO
Search
- PMC: articles
- PubMed: articles
- NCBI: proteins

Isoflavone 3'-hydroxylase (EC 1.14.14.88, Formerly EC 1.14.13.52) is an enzyme that catalyzes the chemical reaction

formononetin
+ NADPH
O_{2}
2 H_{2}O
calycosin
+ NADP^{+}

Isoflavone 3'-hydroxylase is a cytochrome P450 protein containing heme. It requires a partner cytochrome P450 reductase for functional expression. This uses nicotinamide adenine dinucleotide phosphate (NADPH). The systematic name of this enzyme class is formononetin,NADPH:oxygen oxidoreductase (3'-hydroxylating). It is also called isoflavone 3'-monooxygenase.

The enzyme isolated from chickpea is part of the biosynthetic pathway to pterocarpans which act as phytoalexins.
