= Beiqi =

Beiqi may refer to:

- Northern Qi (550–577; 北齊/北齐 Běi Qí), a dynasty in North China during the Northern and Southern Dynasties period
- BAIC Group (北汽 Běiqì), Chinese automobile and machine manufacturers, abbreviated as Beiqi in Chinese
  - Foton Motor, also known as Beiqi Foton Motor, a subsidiary of BAIC Group
- Astragalus membranaceus (北芪 běiqí), used in traditional Chinese medicine
