= Retusin (flavonol) =

- Chemical structure of

Names
- IUPAC name 5-Hydroxy-3,3′,4′,7-tetramethoxyflavone
- Systematic IUPAC name 2-(3,4-Dimethoxyphenyl)-5-hydroxy-3,7-dimethoxy-4H-1-benzopyran-4-one
- Other names Quercetin tetramethylether Quercetin-3,7,3',4'-tetramethyl ether Tetramethylquercetin; Retusine

Identifiers
CAS Number	1245-15-4
3D model (JSmol)	Interactive image
ChEBI	CHEBI:144861
ChEMBL	ChEMBL77966
ChemSpider	4508983
ECHA InfoCard	100.013.629
EC Number	214-991-4
PubChem CID	5352005
UNII	M8591903SD
CompTox Dashboard (EPA)	DTXSID60924839
- InChI: InChI=1S/C19H18O7/c1-22-11-8-12(20)16-15(9-11)26-18(19(25-4)17(16)21)10-5-6-13(23-2)14(7-10)24-3/h5-9,20H,1-4H3 Key: HHGPYJLEJGNWJA-UHFFFAOYSA-N; InChI=1/C19H18O7/c1-22-11-8-12(20)16-15(9-11)26-18(19(25-4)17(16)21)10-5-6-13(23-2)14(7-10)24-3/h5-9,20H,1-4H3 Key: HHGPYJLEJGNWJA-UHFFFAOYAJ
- SMILES: COC1=C(C=C(C=C1)C2=C(C(=O)C3=C(C=C(C=C3O2)OC)O)OC)OC

Properties
Chemical formula	C_{19}H_{18}O_{7}
Molar mass	358.34 g/mol
- Except where otherwise noted, data are given for materials in their standard state (at 25 °C [77 °F], 100 kPa). verify (what is ?) Infobox references

Retusin is an O-methylated flavonol, a type of flavonoid. It can be found in Origanum vulgare and in Ariocarpus retusus.
