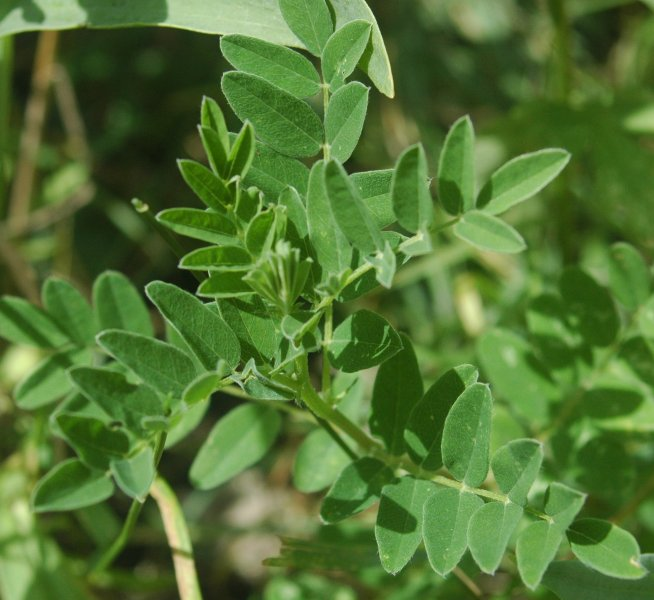

Scientific classification
- Kingdom: Plantae
- Clade: Tracheophytes
- Clade: Angiosperms
- Clade: Eudicots
- Clade: Rosids
- Order: Fabales
- Family: Fabaceae
- Subfamily: Faboideae
- Genus: Astragalus
- Species: A. mongholicus

Binomial name
- Astragalus mongholicus Bunge

Synonyms
- Astragalus borealimongolicus Y.Z.Zhao; Astragalus membranaceus var. mandshuricus Nakai, not validly publ.; Astragalus membranaceus var. mongholicus (Bunge) P.K.Hsiao; Astragalus membranaceus f. propinquus (Schischk.) Kitag.; Astragalus membranaceus Fisch. ex Bunge, nom. cons.; Astragalus mongholicus var. dahuricus (Fisch. ex DC.) Podlech; Astragalus penduliflorus var. dahuricus (Fisch. ex DC.) X.Y.Zhu; Astragalus penduliflorus var. mongholicus (Bunge) X.Y.Zhu; Astragalus propinquus var. glaber Vydrina, no type.; Astragalus propinquus Schischk.; Astragalus purdomii N.D.Simpson; Phaca abbreviata Ledeb.; Phaca alpina var. dahurica Fisch. ex DC.; Phaca macrostachys Turcz.; Phaca membranacea Fisch. ex Link, nom. nud.; Tragacantha membranacea (Fisch. ex Bunge) Kuntze; Tragacantha mongholica (Bunge) Kuntze

= Astragalus mongholicus =

Species of plant

Astragalus mongholicus, commonly known as Mongolian milkvetch in English; 'Хунчир' in Mongolian; huángqí (Chinese: 黃芪), běiqí (Chinese: 北芪) or huánghuā huángqí (Chinese: 黃花黃耆), in Mongolia, is a flowering plant in the family Fabaceae. It is one of the 50 fundamental herbs used in traditional Mongolian medicine. It is a perennial plant and it is not listed as being threatened.

== Distribution ==
A. mongholicus is widespread in temperate Asia, being found in Kazakhstan, from Siberia to the Russian Far East, in Mongolia, and in west and north China.

== Herbalism ==
A. mongholicus is used in traditional Chinese medicine (TCM). A. mongholicus is a component in Lectranal, a food supplement used in treatment of seasonal allergic rhinitis, though there is limited evidence of its effectiveness.

== Chemistry ==
Chemical constituents of the roots (Radix Astragali) include polysaccharides and triterpenoids (such as astragalosides), as well as isoflavones (including kumatakenin, calycosin, and formononetin) and their glycosides and malonates. It contains the saponin cycloastragenol.

== Toxicology ==
While several other species of Astragalus are known to cause severe poisonings in livestock due to indolizine alkaloids, aliphatic nitro compounds, and accumulated selenium, none of these constituents have been detected in Astragalus mongholicus used in dietary supplements and TCM preparations.

== Compendial status ==
A. mongholicus is listed (as A. propinquus) in the following official pharmacopoeia:

- Japanese Pharmacopoeia

== See also ==
- Tremella fuciformis
