= Calycosin =

- Chemical structure of calycosin

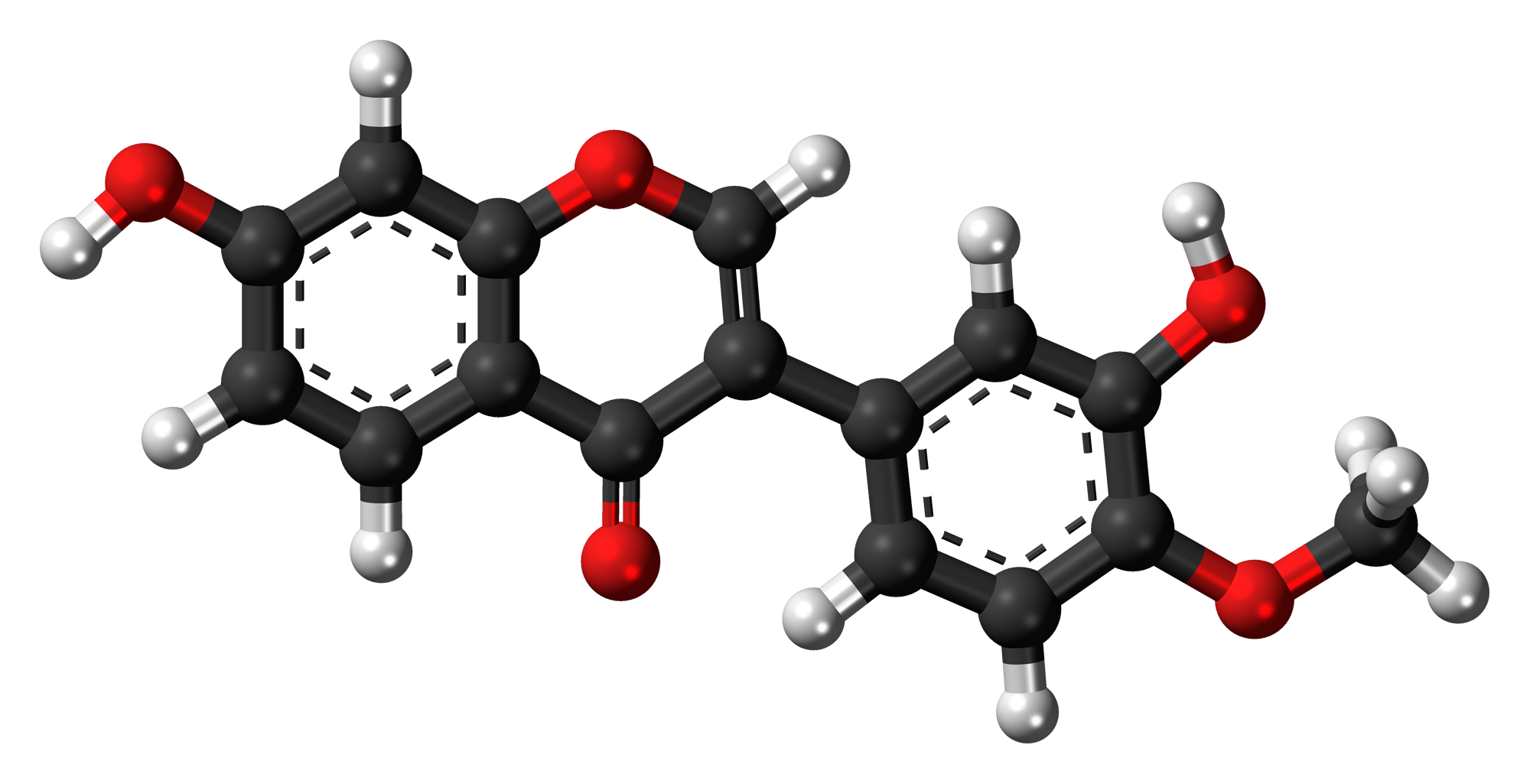

Names
- IUPAC name 3′,7-Dihydroxy-4′-methoxyisoflavone
- Systematic IUPAC name 7-Hydroxy-3-(3-hydroxy-4-methoxyphenyl)-4H-1-benzopyran-4-one
- Other names 7,3′-Dihydroxy-4′-methoxyisoflavone; 3′-Hydroxyformononetin

Identifiers
CAS Number	20575-57-9
3D model (JSmol)	Interactive image
ChEBI	CHEBI:17793
ChEMBL	ChEMBL241608
ChemSpider	4444104
ECHA InfoCard	100.222.904
PubChem CID	5280448
UNII	09N3E8P7TA
CompTox Dashboard (EPA)	DTXSID70174580
- InChI: InChI=1S/C16H12O5/c1-20-14-5-2-9(6-13(14)18)12-8-21-15-7-10(17)3-4-11(15)16(12)19/h2-8,17-18H,1H3 Key: ZZAJQOPSWWVMBI-UHFFFAOYSA-N
- SMILES: O=C\1c3c(O/C=C/1c2ccc(OC)c(O)c2)cc(O)cc3

Properties
Chemical formula	C_{16}H_{12}O_{5}
Molar mass	284.267 g·mol^{−1}
- Except where otherwise noted, data are given for materials in their standard state (at 25 °C [77 °F], 100 kPa). verify (what is ?) Infobox references

Calycosin is an O-methylated isoflavone. It can be isolated from Astragalus membranaceus Bge. var. mongholicus and Trifolium pratense L. (red clover).

== Biosynthesis ==
Isoflavone 3′-hydroxylase uses formononetin, NADPH, H^{+} and O_{2} to produce calycosin, NADP^{+} and H_{2}O.

== Pharmacology ==
Calycosin has been shown to possess anti-cancer properties in vitro, and extracts of Astragalus membranaceus have been used to complement chemotherapy regimes in treatment of cancer in China.
