= Astragaloside =

Group of chemical compounds

Chemical structure of astragaloside IV

Astragalosides are a series of related chemical compounds isolated from Astragalus membranaceus.

Also known as astrasieversianin, AS-IV, astraversianin XIV, or cyclosiversioside F, it is a white powder with a melting point of 284 °C–285 °C (Wang et al., 1987). Its molecular formula is C_{41}H_{68}O_{14}, and its theoretically accurate molecular weight is 784.4609.

Research on astragaloside IV, TA-65 in particular, has found that it has the potential to activate the telomerase enzyme in humans to lengthen telomeres at the ends of human chromosomes.
