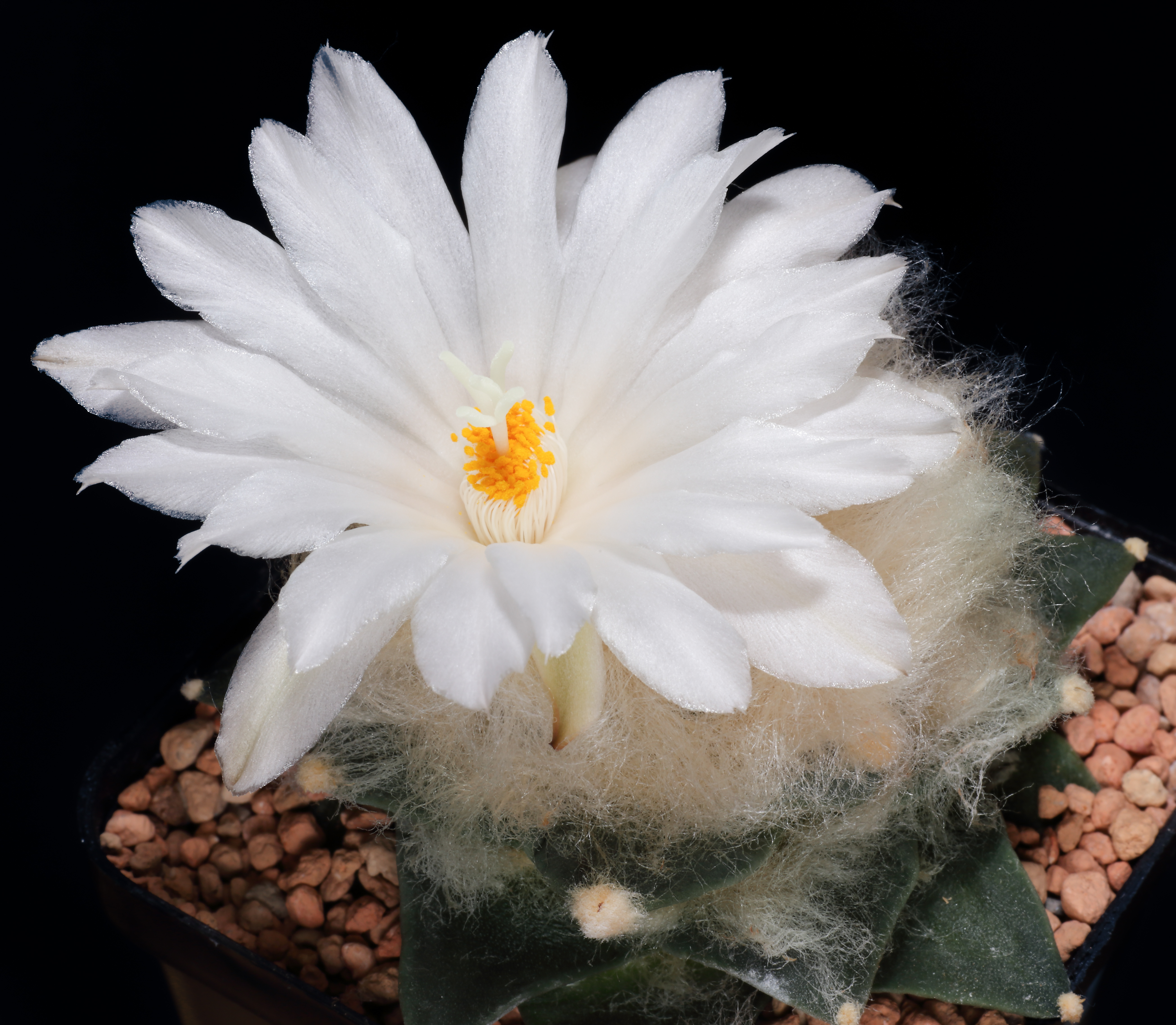

Conservation status
- Least Concern (IUCN 3.1)
- CITES Appendix I (CITES)

Scientific classification
- Kingdom: Plantae
- Clade: Tracheophytes
- Clade: Angiosperms
- Clade: Eudicots
- Order: Caryophyllales
- Family: Cactaceae
- Subfamily: Cactoideae
- Genus: Ariocarpus
- Species: A. retusus

Binomial name
- Ariocarpus retusus Scheidw.

Synonyms
- List: Anhalonium prismaticum Lem. 1839; Ariocarpus prismaticus Cobbold 1903; Anhalonium areolosum Lem. 1859; Anhalonium elongatum Salm-Dyck 1845; Anhalonium furfuraceum (S.Watson) J.M.Coult. 1894; Anhalonium pulvilligerum Lem. 1843; Anhalonium retusum Salm-Dyck 1845; Ariocarpus confusus Halda & Horáček 1997; Ariocarpus elongatus (Salm-Dyck) Wettst. 1928; Ariocarpus elongatus subsp. horacekii (Halda) Halda 1998; Ariocarpus furfuraceus (S.Watson) H.S.Thomps. 1898; Ariocarpus furfuraceus f. cristata Frič 1925; Ariocarpus furfuraceus var. rostratus A.Berger 1929; Ariocarpus prismaticus var. maior Frič 1925; Ariocarpus prismaticus var. minor Frič 1925; Ariocarpus pulvilligeris (Monv. ex C.F.Först. & Rümpler) K.Schum. 1898; Ariocarpus retusus subsp. confusus (Halda & Horáček) Lüthy 1999; Ariocarpus retusus var. furfuraceus (S.Watson) G.Frank 1975; Ariocarpus retusus subsp. horacekii Halda & Panar. 1998; Ariocarpus retusus subsp. jarmilae Halda, Horáček & Panar. 1998; Ariocarpus retusus subsp. panarottoi Halda & Horáček 1998; Ariocarpus retusus subsp. pectinatus Weisbarth 2003; Ariocarpus retusus subsp. scapharostroides Halda & Horáček 1997; Ariocarpus retusus subsp. sladkovskyi Halda & Kupčák 2000; Ariocarpus trigonus var. elongatus (Salm-Dyck) Backeb. 1961; Ariocarpus trigonus var. horacekii Halda 1997; Cactus areolosus Kuntze 1891; Cactus prismaticus (Hemsl.) Kuntze 1891; Cactus procerus (C.Ehrenb.) Kuntze 1891; Mammillaria aloides Monv. ex Labour. 1853; Mammillaria areolosa Hemsl. 1880; Mammillaria elongata Hemsl. 1880; Mammillaria furfuracea S.Watson 1890; Mammillaria prismatica Hemsl. 1880; Mammillaria procera C.Ehrenb. 1849; Mammillaria pulvilligera Monv. ex C.F.Först. & Rümpler 1885; Mammillaria purpuracea S.Watson 1890

= Ariocarpus retusus =

Species of cactus

Ariocarpus retusus is a species of cactus, from the genus Ariocarpus, found mainly in Mexico. It is one of the largest and fastest-growing species in this genus known for a slow rate of growth. Despite its slow growth, often taking ten years to reach flowering age, the retusus is a desirable cactus for cultivation, having attractive flowers and an unusual form for a cactus. It is also one of the most easily cultivated species in the genus.

== Description ==
Ariocarpus retusus has flattened, spherical shoots that are gray-green, blue-green, or yellow-green, growing to heights of 3 to 25 centimeters and diameters of 4 to 30 centimeters. The erect, spreading warts protrude from the soil, crowded at the base, and are somewhat pointed or sharp-tipped with rounded or flat tops. The warts measure 1.5 to 4 centimeters long and 1 to 3.5 centimeters wide, sometimes as long as they are wide or twice as long. Occasionally, areoles are present at the tips of the warts. The flowers are cream to light yellow, white (sometimes with a red central stripe), or pinkish red, and have a diameter of 3 to 5 centimeters. The elongated fruits are 1 to 2.5 centimeters long.

The chromosome count is 2n = 22.

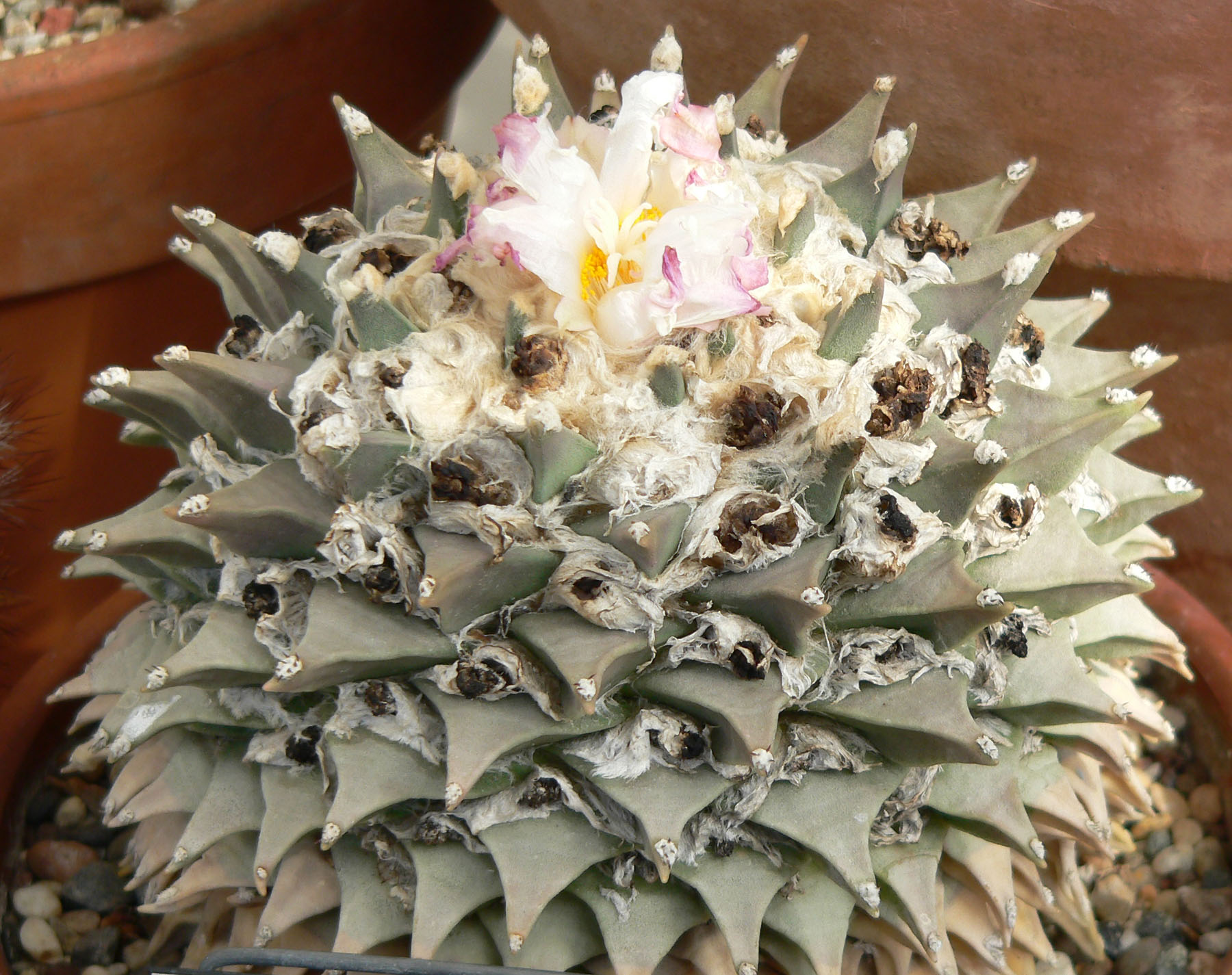
Large flowering Ariocarpus retusus

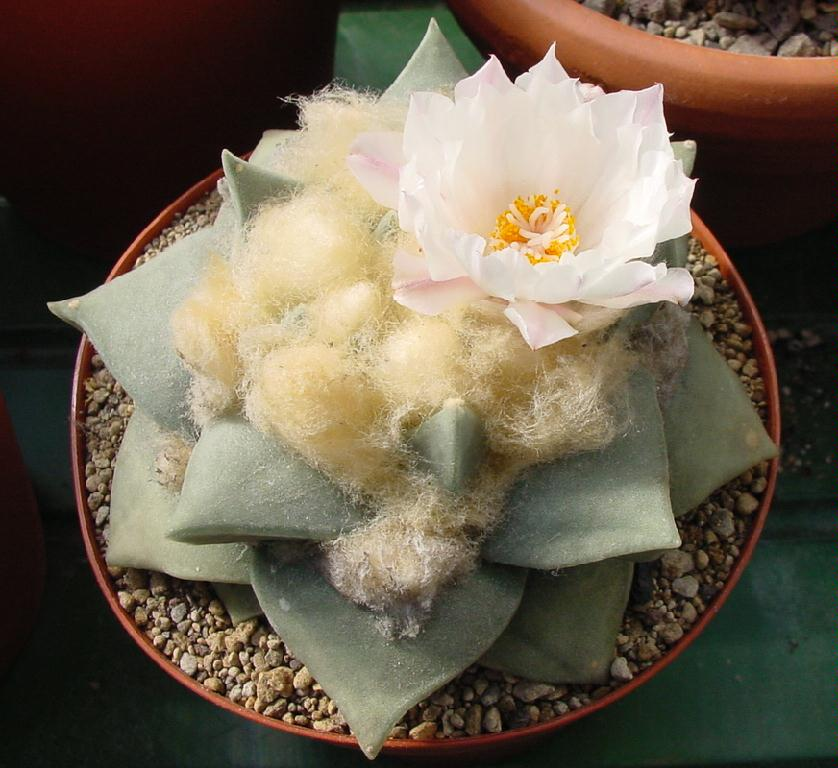
small flowering plant

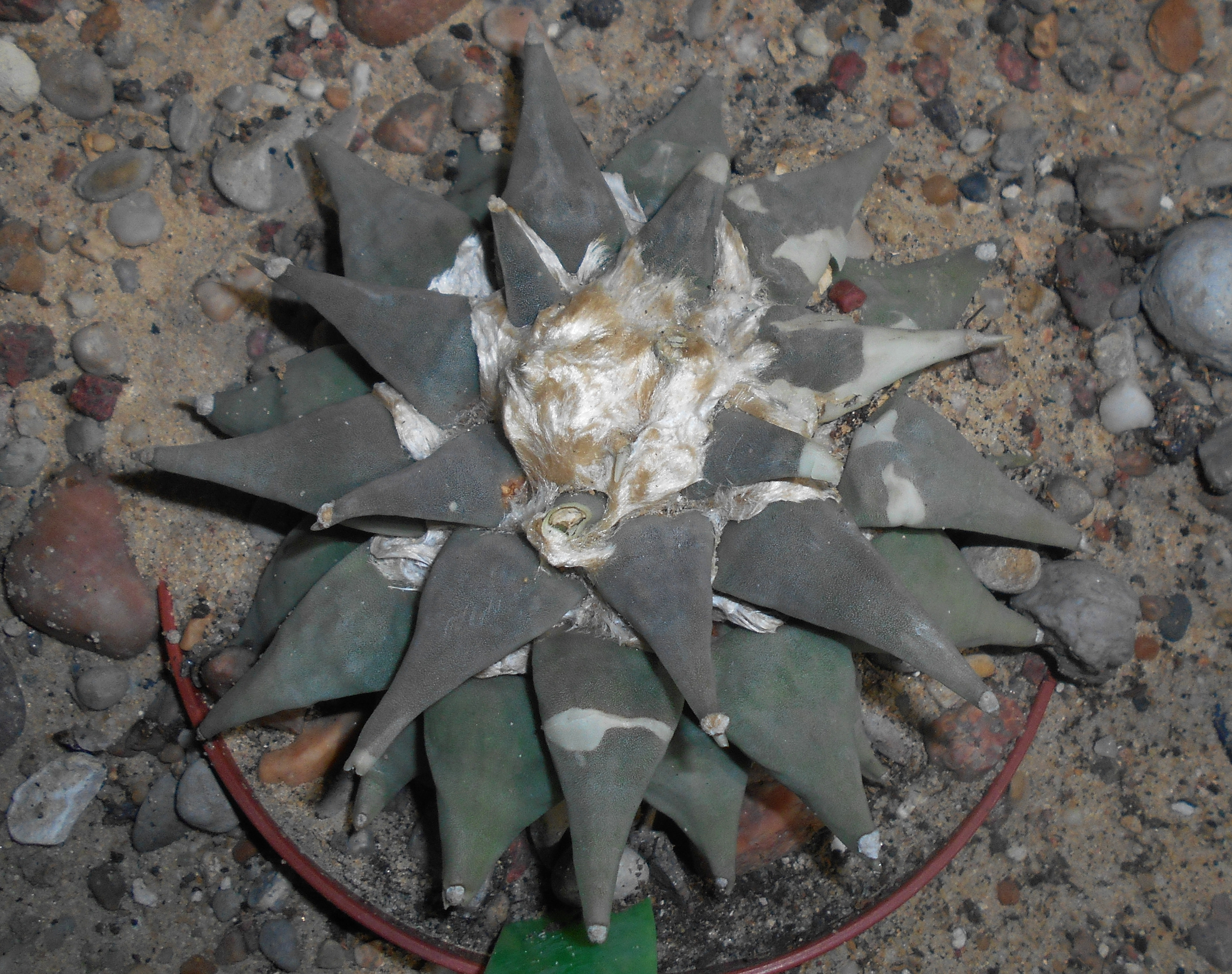
Plant

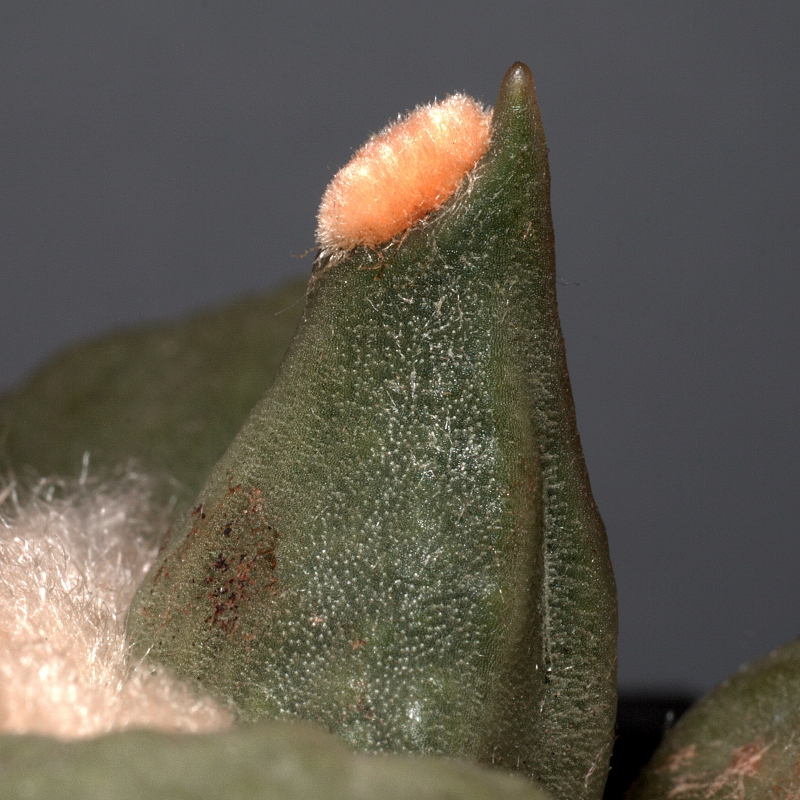
Areoles

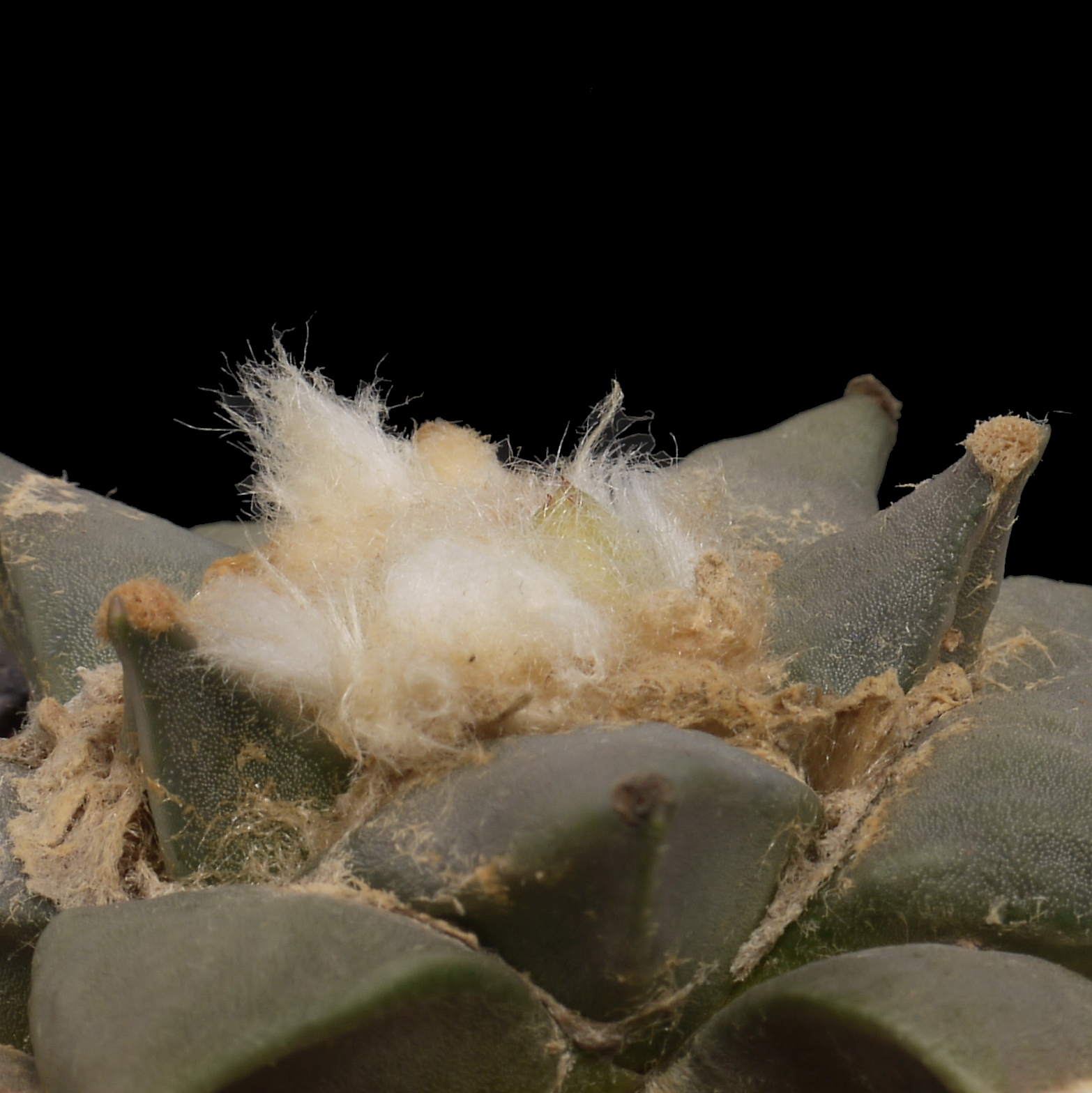

== Distribution ==
Ariocarpus retusus is found in Mexico, from the states of Coahuila and Nuevo León south along both sides of the Sierra Madre Occidental to San Luis Potosí, Tamaulipas, and Zacatecas in the high Chihuahuan desert at elevations between 1,300 and 2,000 meters. This species grows on limestone and rocky slopes and in grasslands.

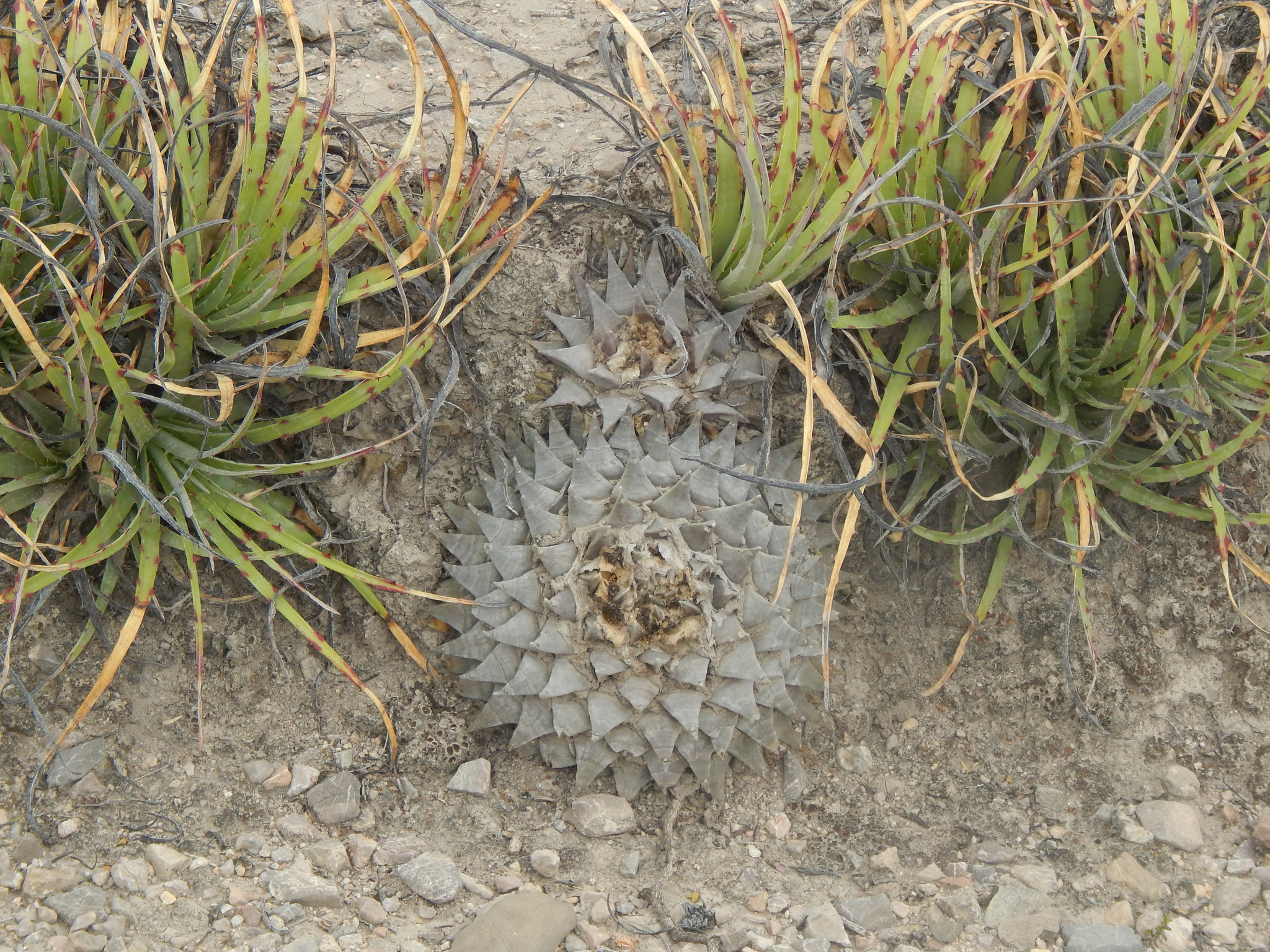
Plant growing in habitat near Peyote San Luis Potosi

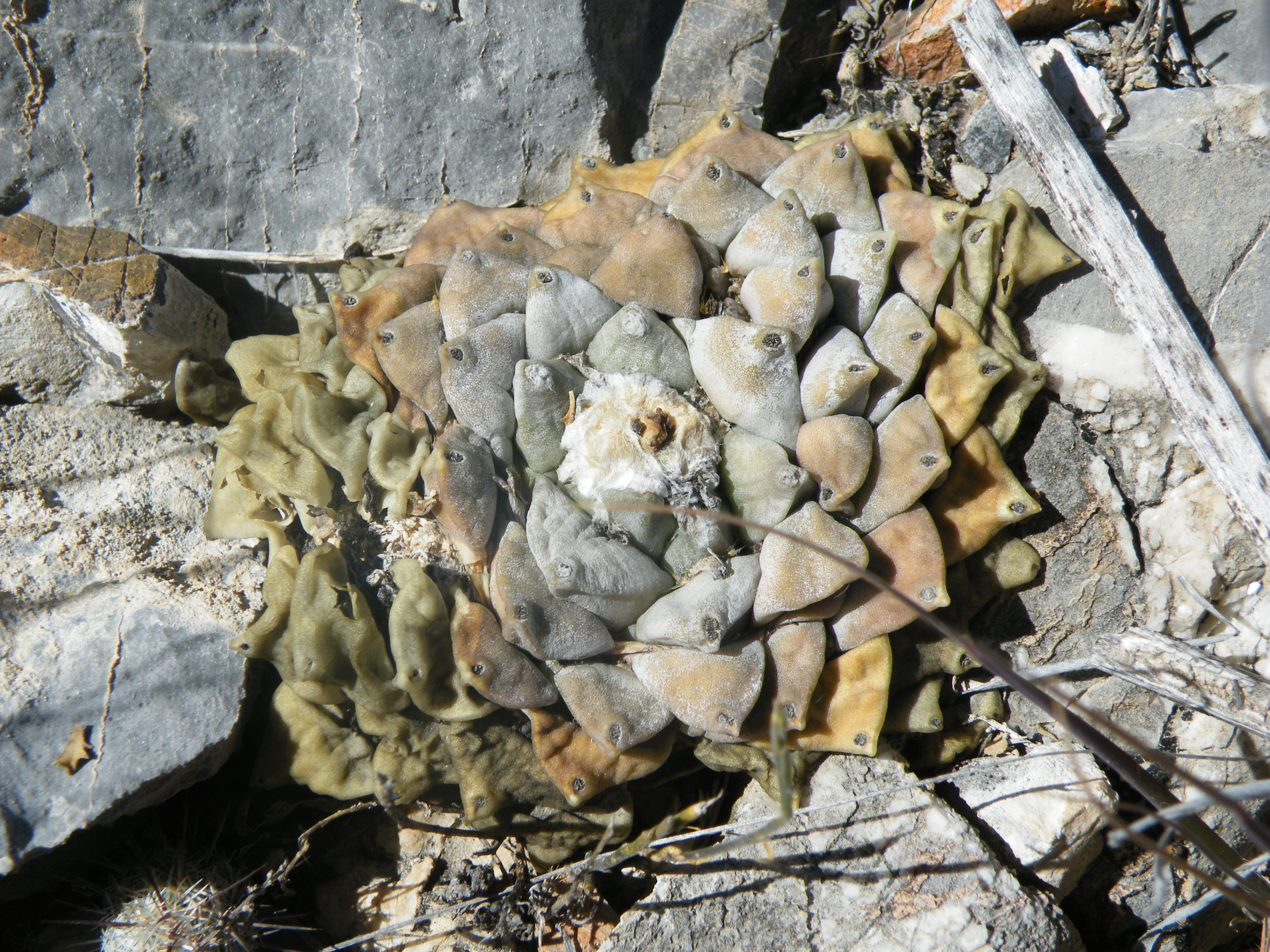
Plant growing in habitat near Ranch San Rafael, Nuevo Leon

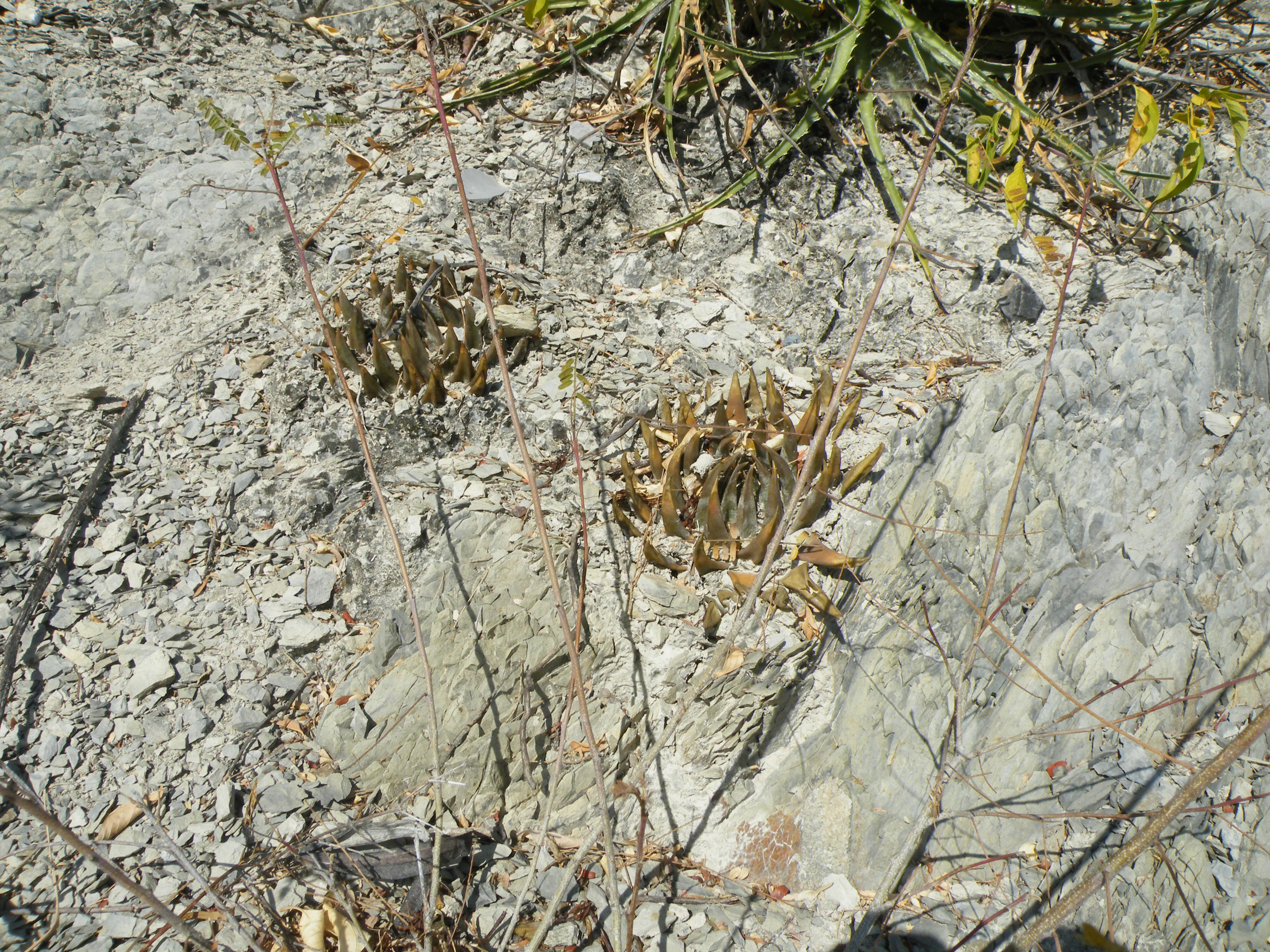
Plant growing on limestone near San Jose De Salamanca, Tamaulipas

== Taxonomy ==
This species was first described in 1838 by Michael Joseph François Scheidweiler, the specific epithet "retusus" comes from Latin, meaning 'blunted,' referring to the shape of the warts.

== Pharmacology ==
Hordenine, N-methyltyramine, N-methyl-3,4-dimethoxy-β-phenethylamine and N-methyl-4-methoxy-β-phenethylamine as well as the flavonol retusin has been found in Ariocarpus retusus. The locals use the slime from the roots of the plants as glue to repair pottery. As a medicinal plant it is used to treat fever. The Huichols use them in religious ceremonies.
