= Kumatakenin =

- Chemical structure of kumatakenin

Names
- IUPAC name 4′,5-Dihydroxy-3,7-dimethoxyflavone
- Systematic IUPAC name 5-Hydroxy-2-(4-hydroxyphenyl)-3,7-dimethoxy-4H-1-benzopyran-4-one
- Other names Jaranol; Kumatakillin; 5,4'-Dihydroxy-3,7-dimethoxyflavone; 3,7-Dimethoxyl kaempferol Kamatakenin

Identifiers
CAS Number	3301-49-3
3D model (JSmol)	Interactive image
ChemSpider	4477326
PubChem CID	5318869
UNII	5FAQ11412T
CompTox Dashboard (EPA)	DTXSID90186645
- InChI: InChI=1S/C17H14O6/c1-21-11-7-12(19)14-13(8-11)23-16(17(22-2)15(14)20)9-3-5-10(18)6-4-9/h3-8,18-19H,1-2H3 Key: BJBUTJQYZDYRMJ-UHFFFAOYSA-N; InChI=1/C17H14O6/c1-21-11-7-12(19)14-13(8-11)23-16(17(22-2)15(14)20)9-3-5-10(18)6-4-9/h3-8,18-19H,1-2H3 Key: BJBUTJQYZDYRMJ-UHFFFAOYAI
- SMILES: COC1=CC(=C2C(=C1)OC(=C(C2=O)OC)C3=CC=C(C=C3)O)O

Properties
Chemical formula	C_{17}H_{14}O_{6}
Molar mass	314.293 g·mol^{−1}
- Except where otherwise noted, data are given for materials in their standard state (at 25 °C [77 °F], 100 kPa). verify (what is ?) Infobox references

Kumatakenin is an O-methylated flavonol. It can be found in Astragalus membranaceus.
