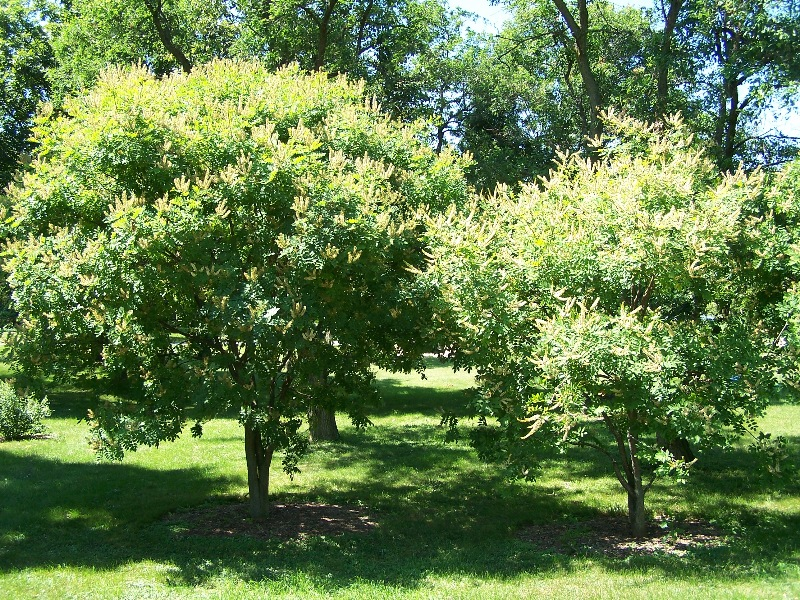
- Maackia amurensis at Morton Arboretum

Scientific classification
- Kingdom: Plantae
- Clade: Tracheophytes
- Clade: Angiosperms
- Clade: Eudicots
- Clade: Rosids
- Order: Fabales
- Family: Fabaceae
- Subfamily: Faboideae
- Genus: Maackia
- Species: M. amurensis

Binomial name
- Maackia amurensis Rupr.

= Maackia amurensis =

Species of legume

Maackia amurensis, commonly known as the Amur maackia, is a species of tree in the family Fabaceae that can grow 15 metres (49 ft) tall. The species epithet and common names are from the Amur River region, where the tree originated; it occurs in northeastern China, Korea, and Russia.

Amur maackia tolerates severe dryness, cold and heavy soils. More interesting than the summer flowers are the unfolding buds in spring which appear silvery and showy like flowers with frost on them.

Named for Richard Otto Karlovich Maack (Richard Maack), a 19th-century Siberian explorer who discovered the tree in the Amur River region on the border between Siberia and China.

== Chemistry ==
The isoflavones daidzein, retusin, genistein and formononetin and the pterocarpans maackiain and medicarpin can be found in M. amurensis cell cultures.

The quinolizidine alkaloids tetrahydroleontidine and 11-epileontidane have been isolated from the species (their only natural source so far).

== Gallery ==
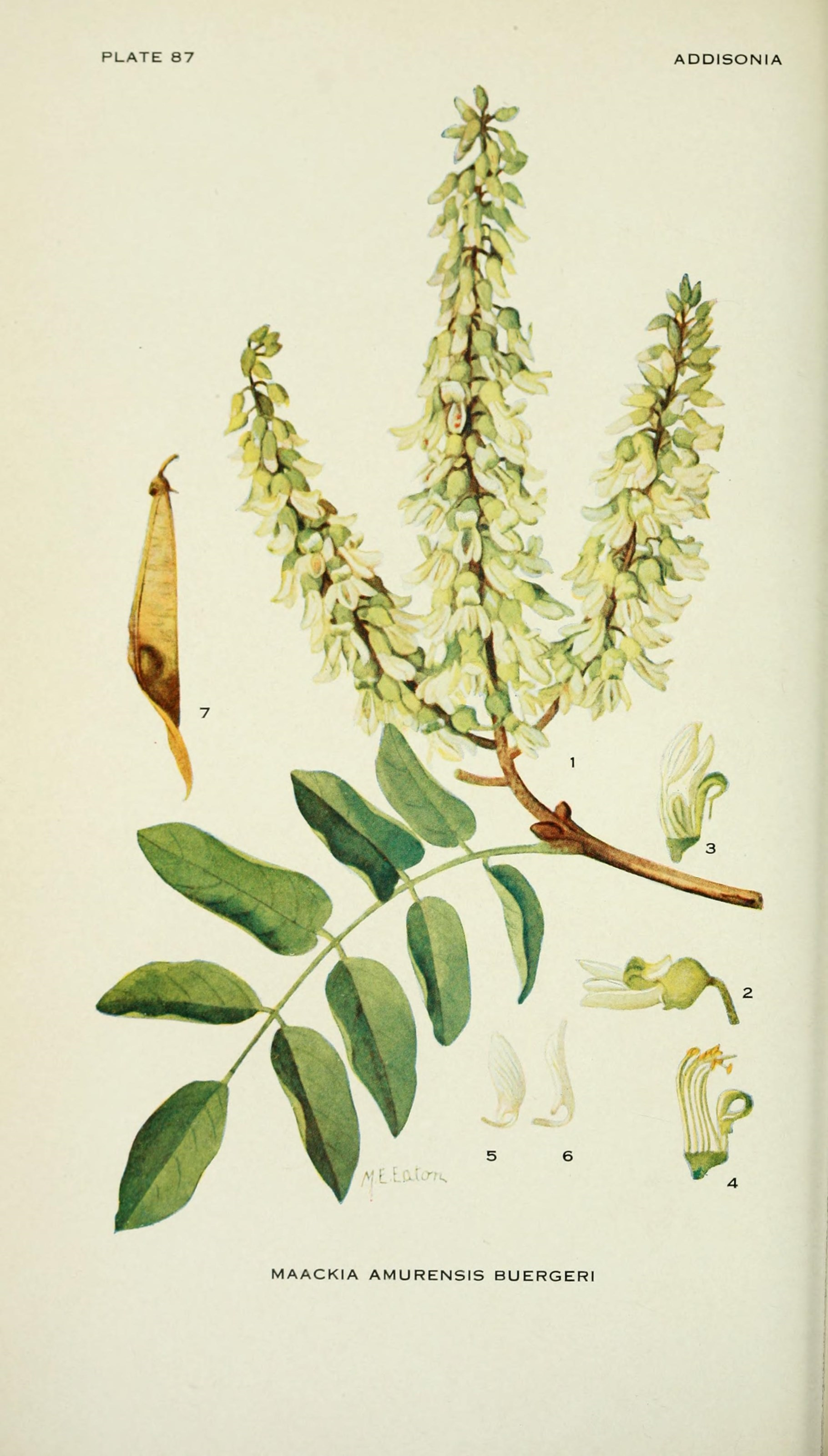
Botanical plate from the journal Addisonia showing anatomical detail of ssp. buergeri

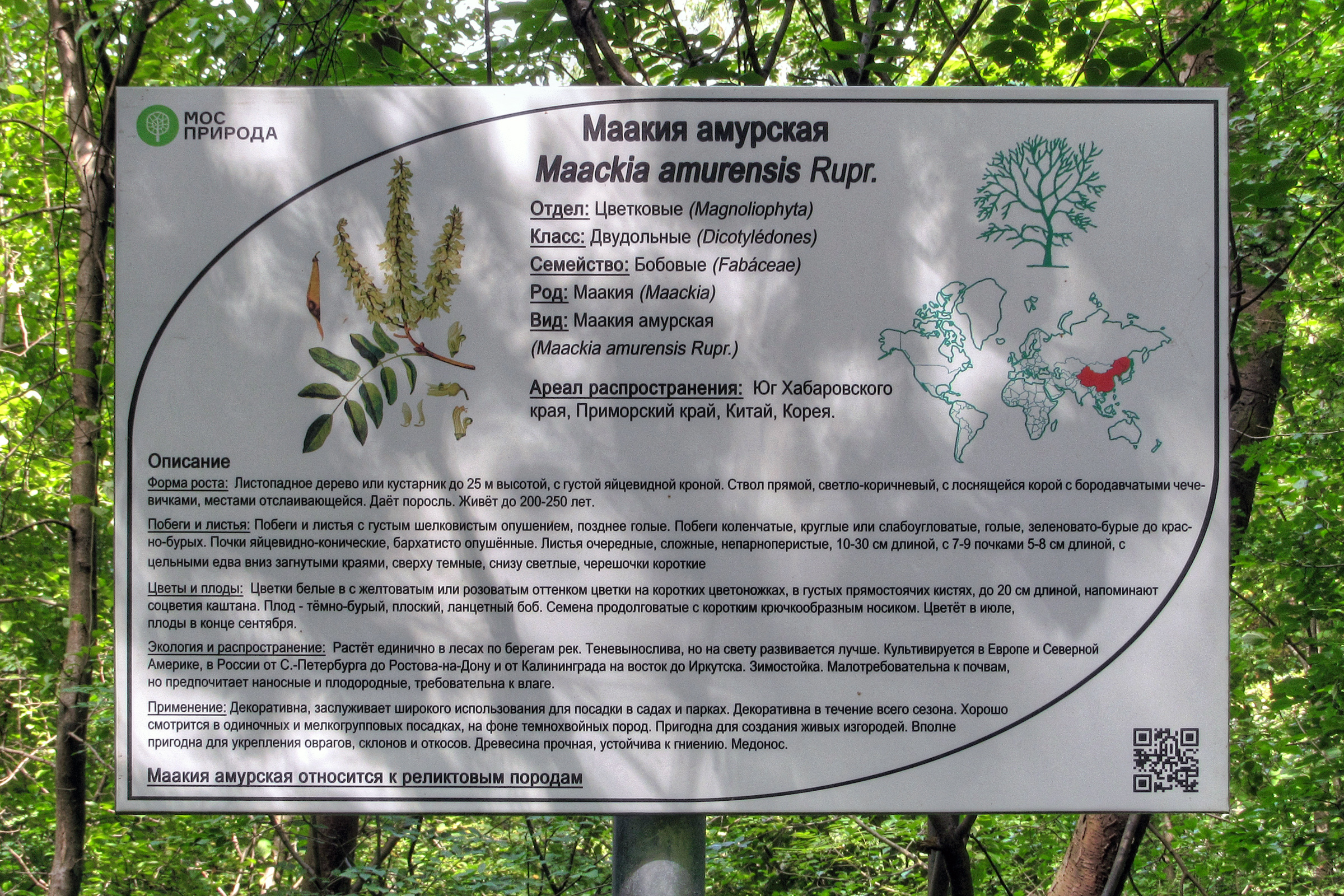
Information board (showing range of species) in Moscow’s Biryulevsky arboretum

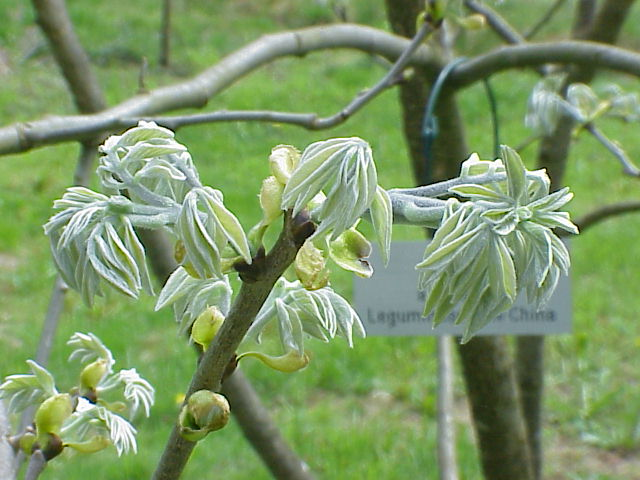
Young Spring shoots

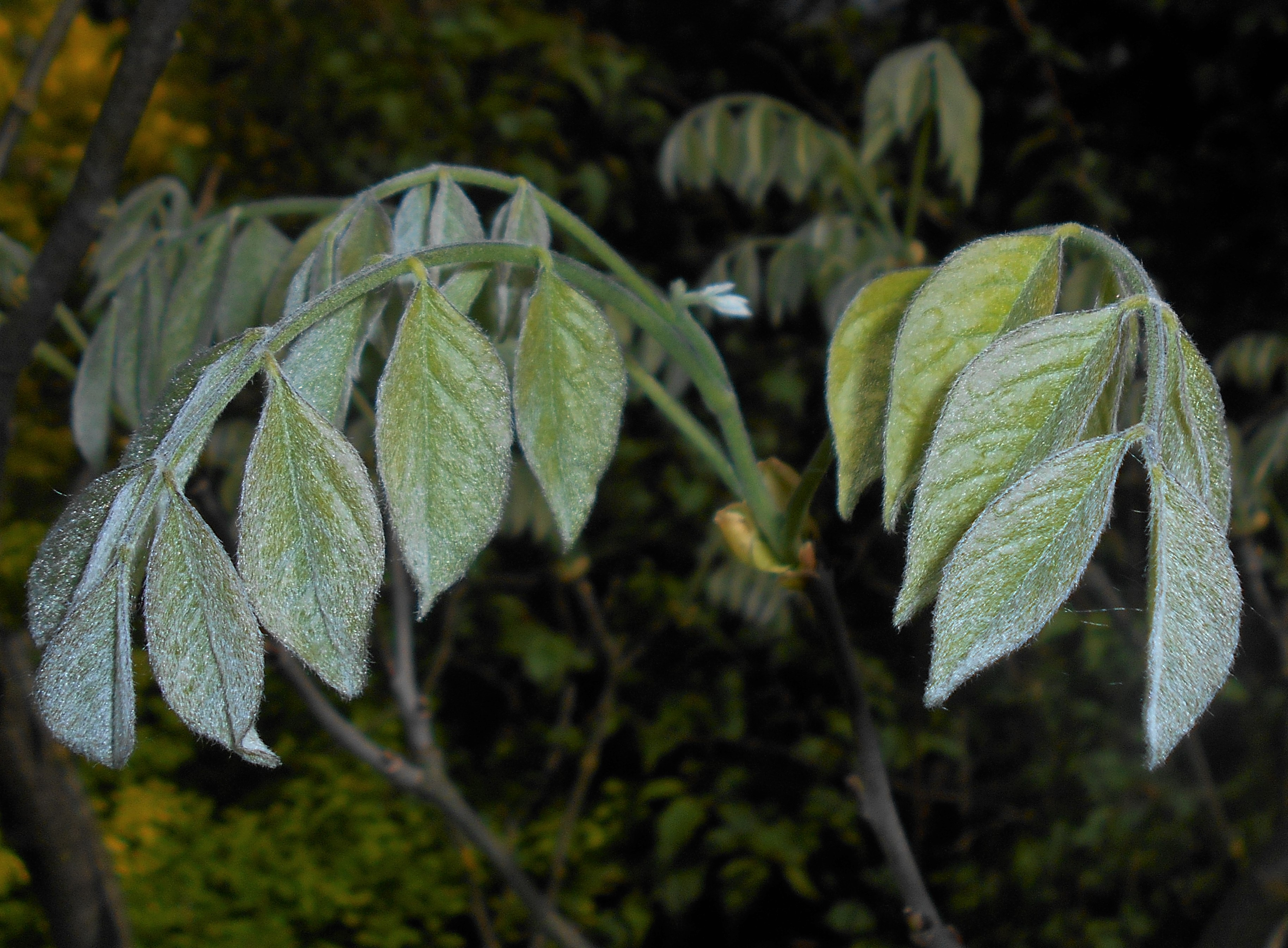
Closeup of young leaves, showing silvery pubescence

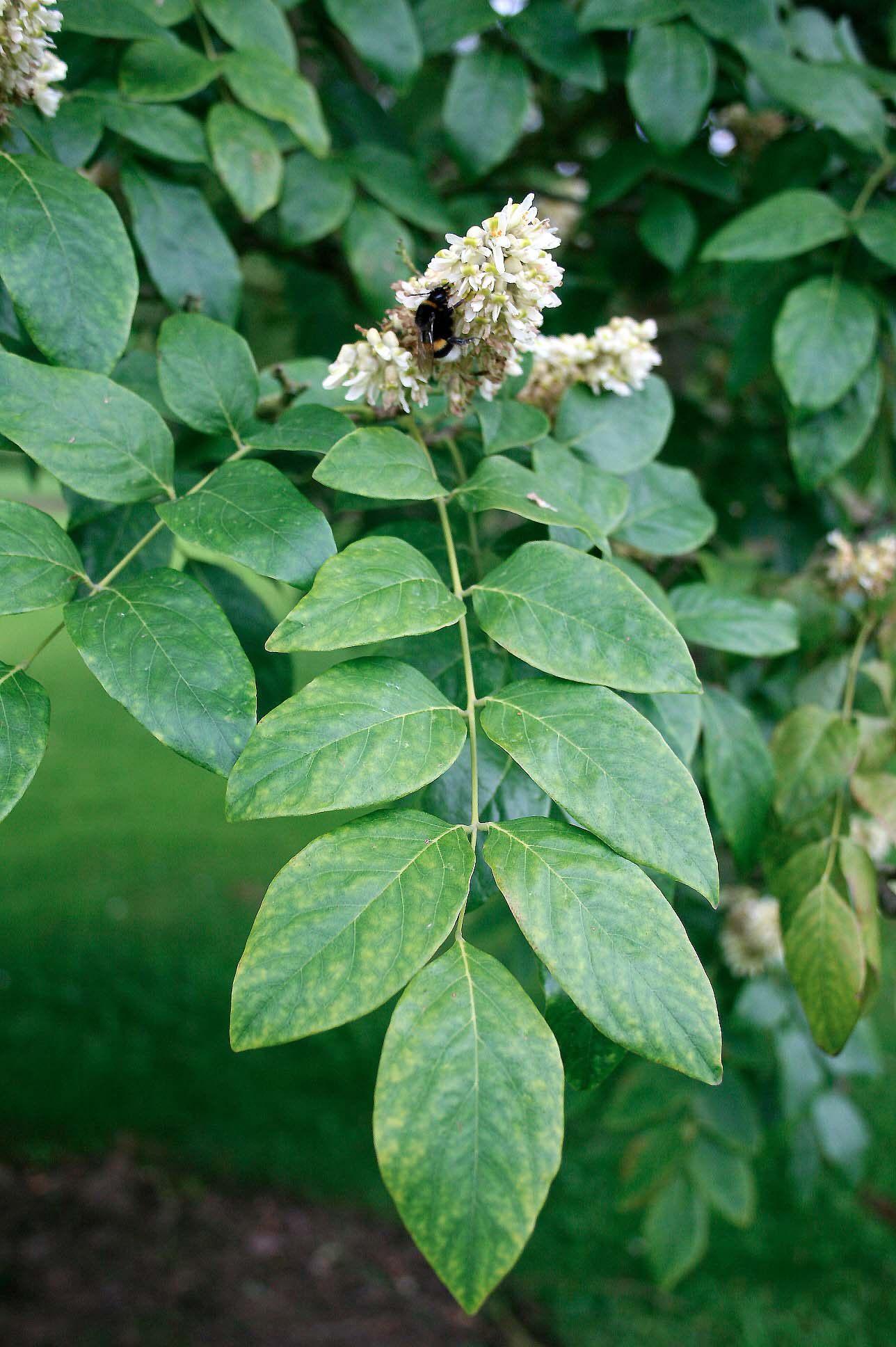
Mature pinnate leaf and bumblebee-pollinated inflorescence

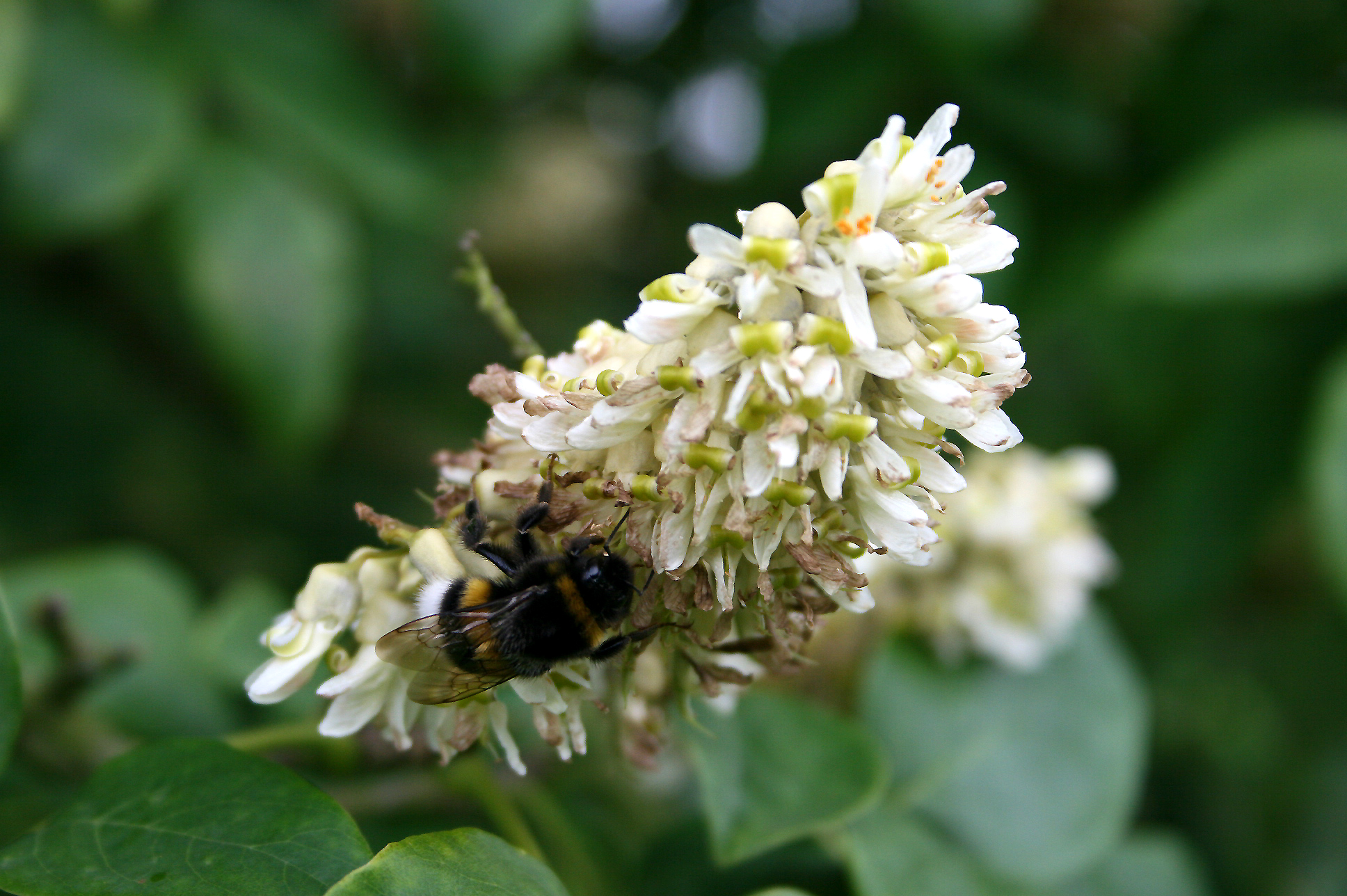
Close-up of bumblebee pollinating flowers

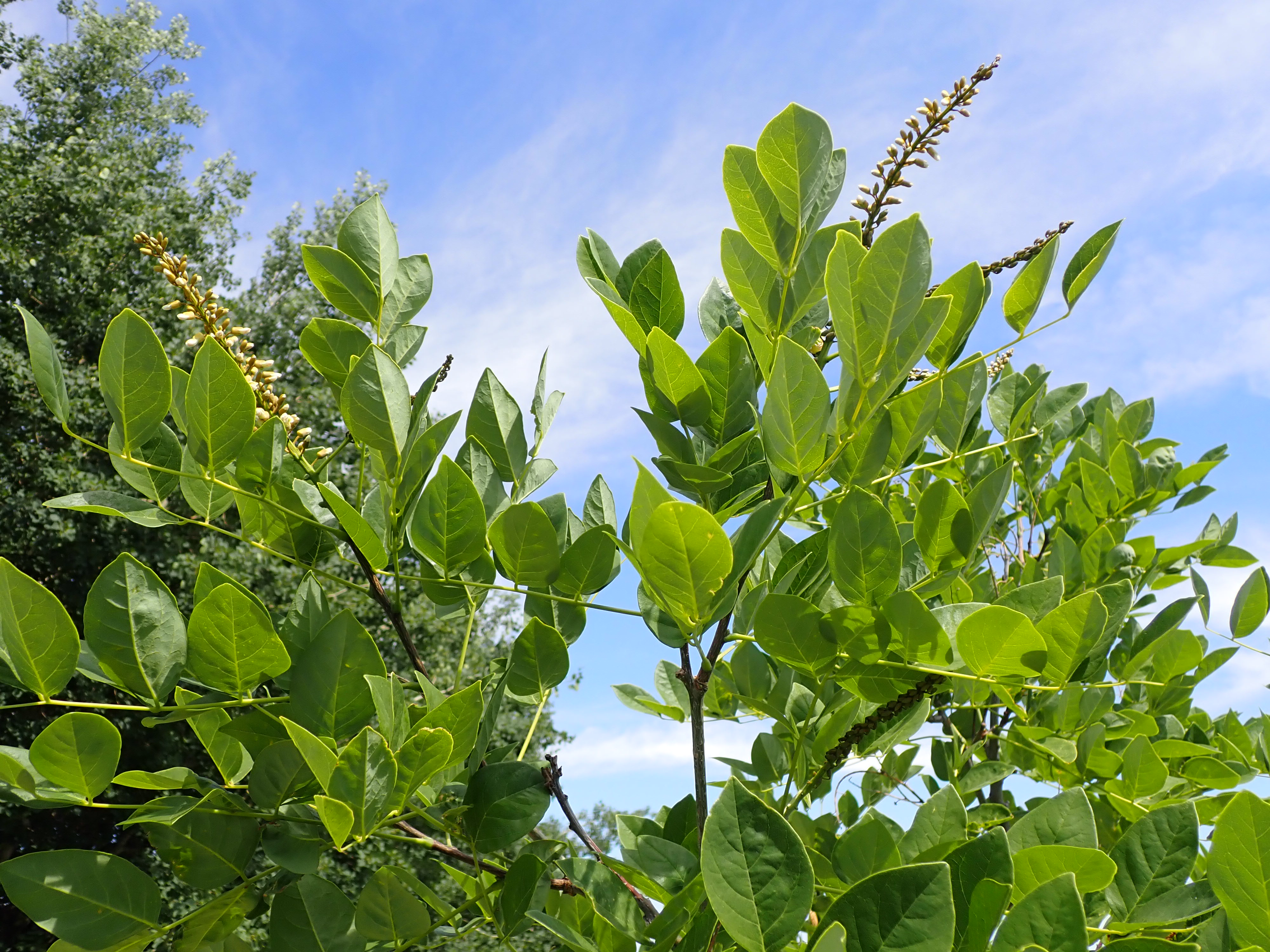
Mature shoots bearing upright inflorescences

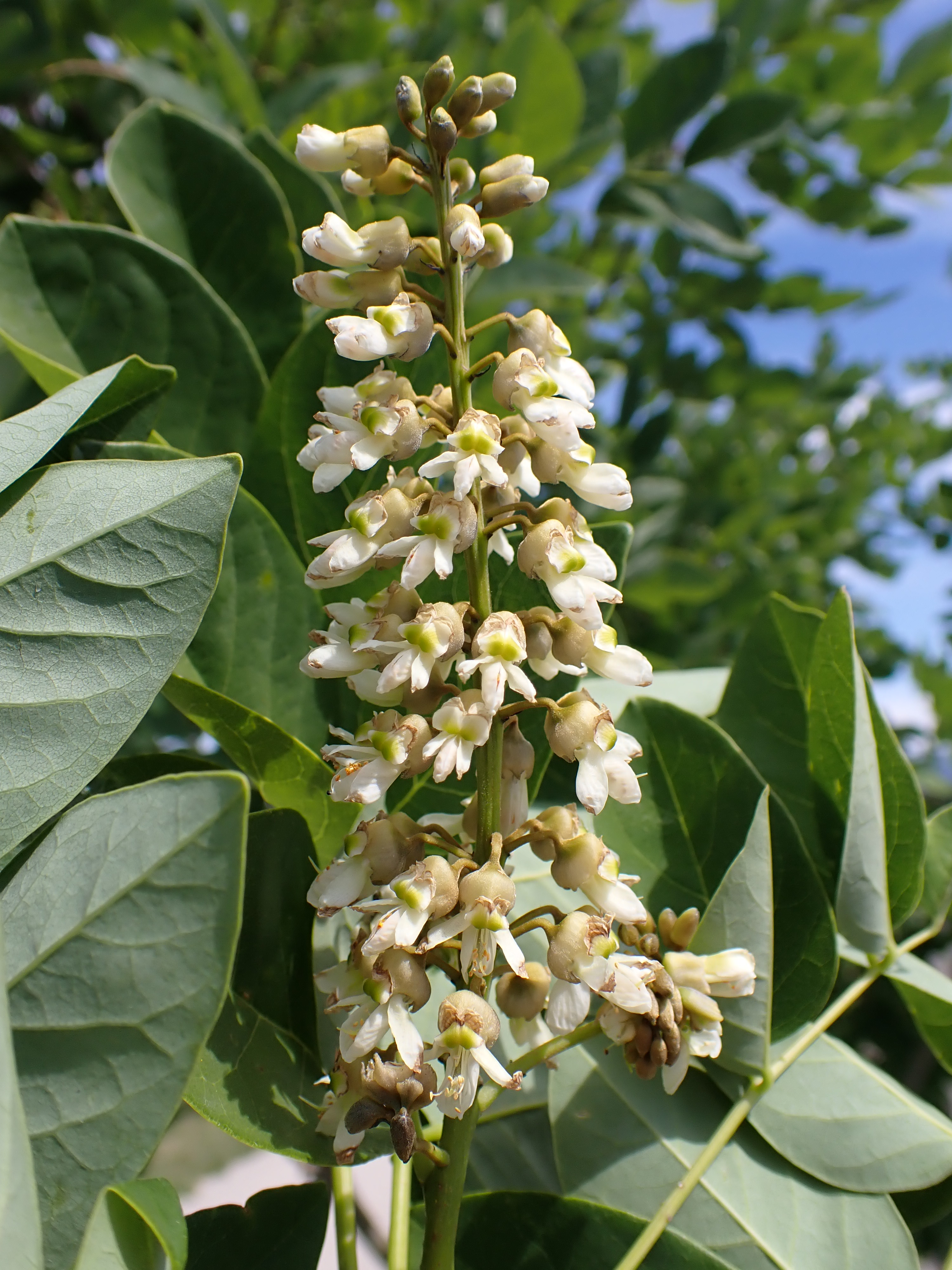
Upright inflorescence, street tree, Bozeman, Montana, US

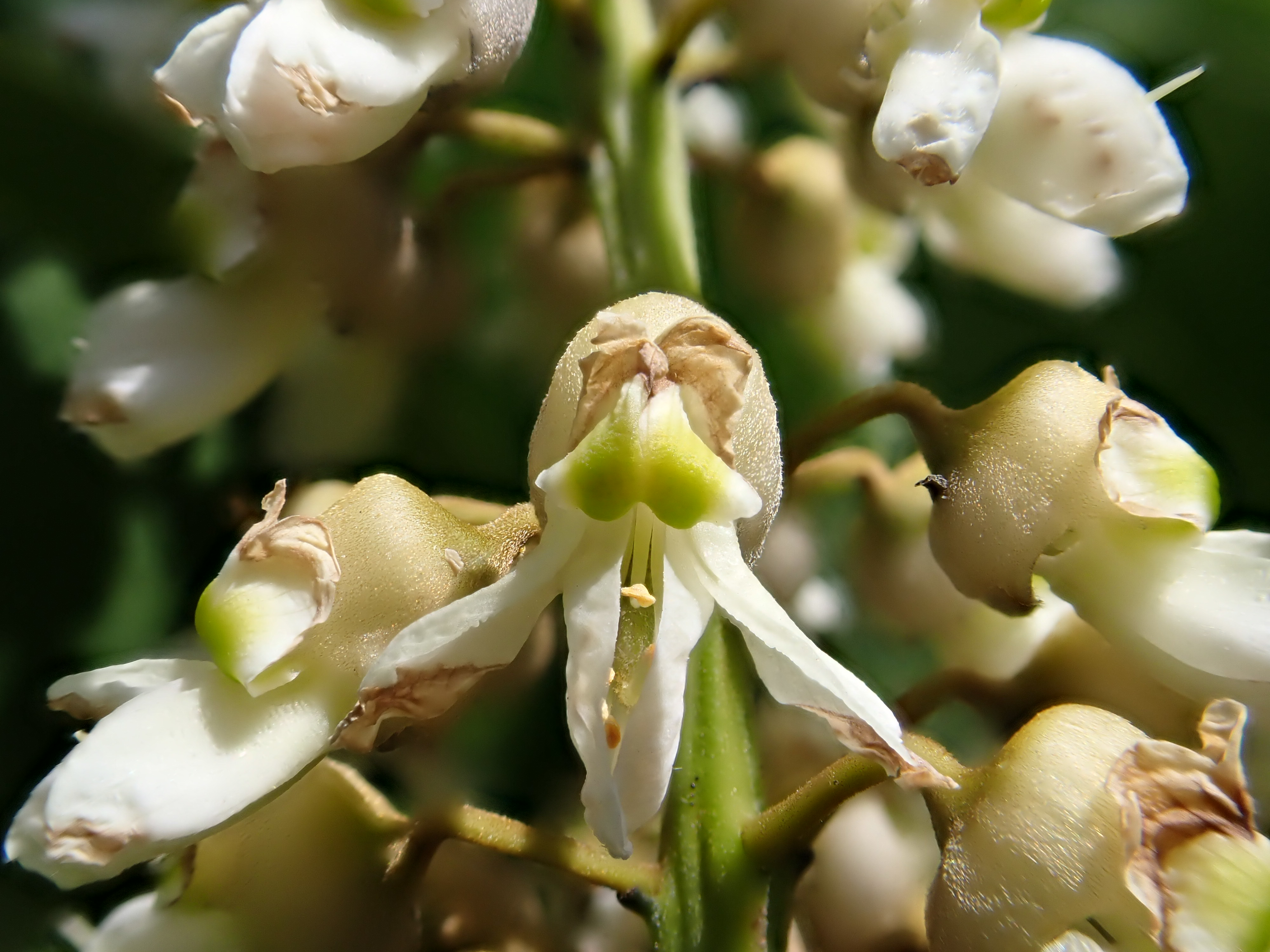
Flowers in extreme closeup

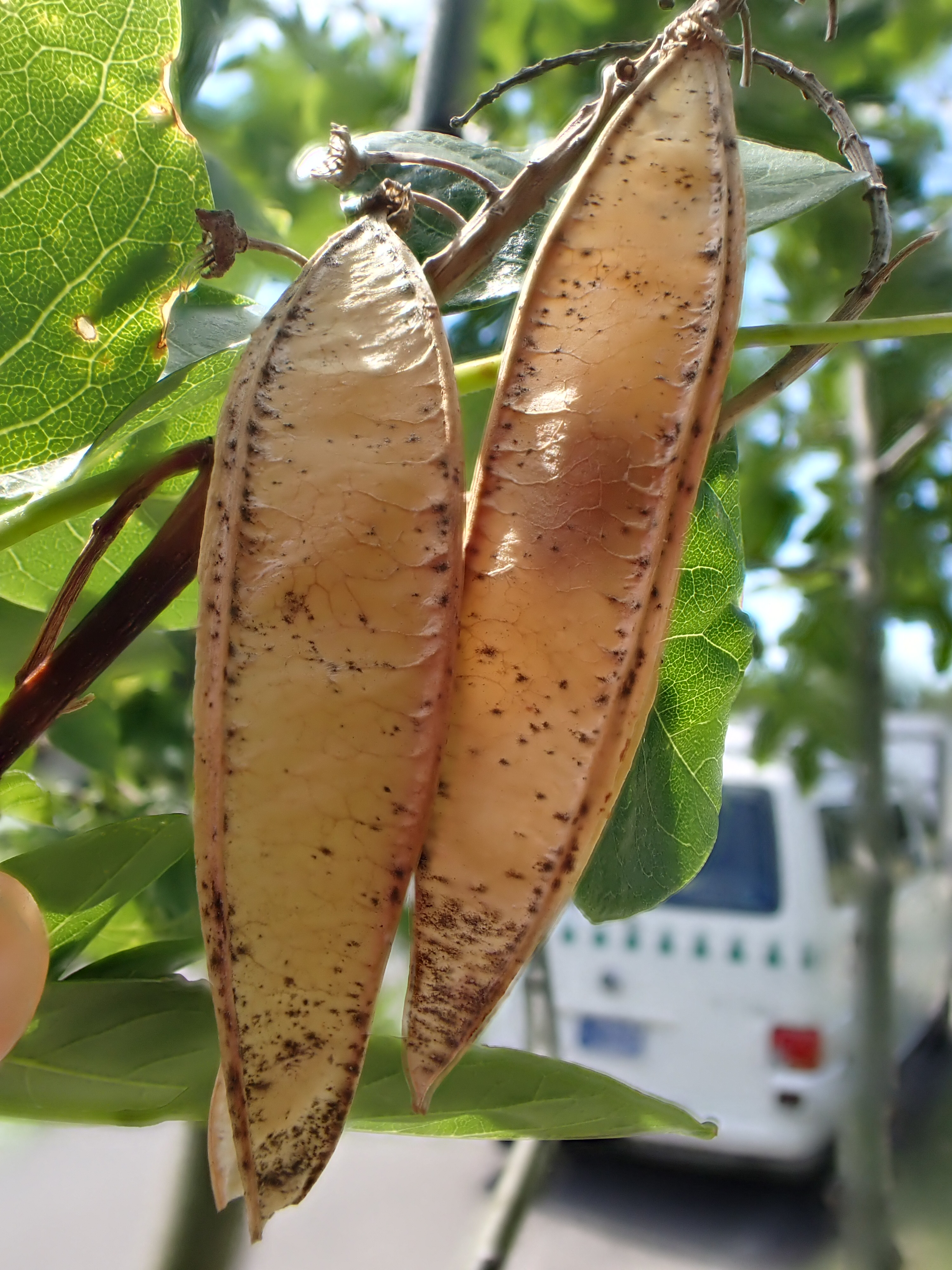
Ripe seed pods

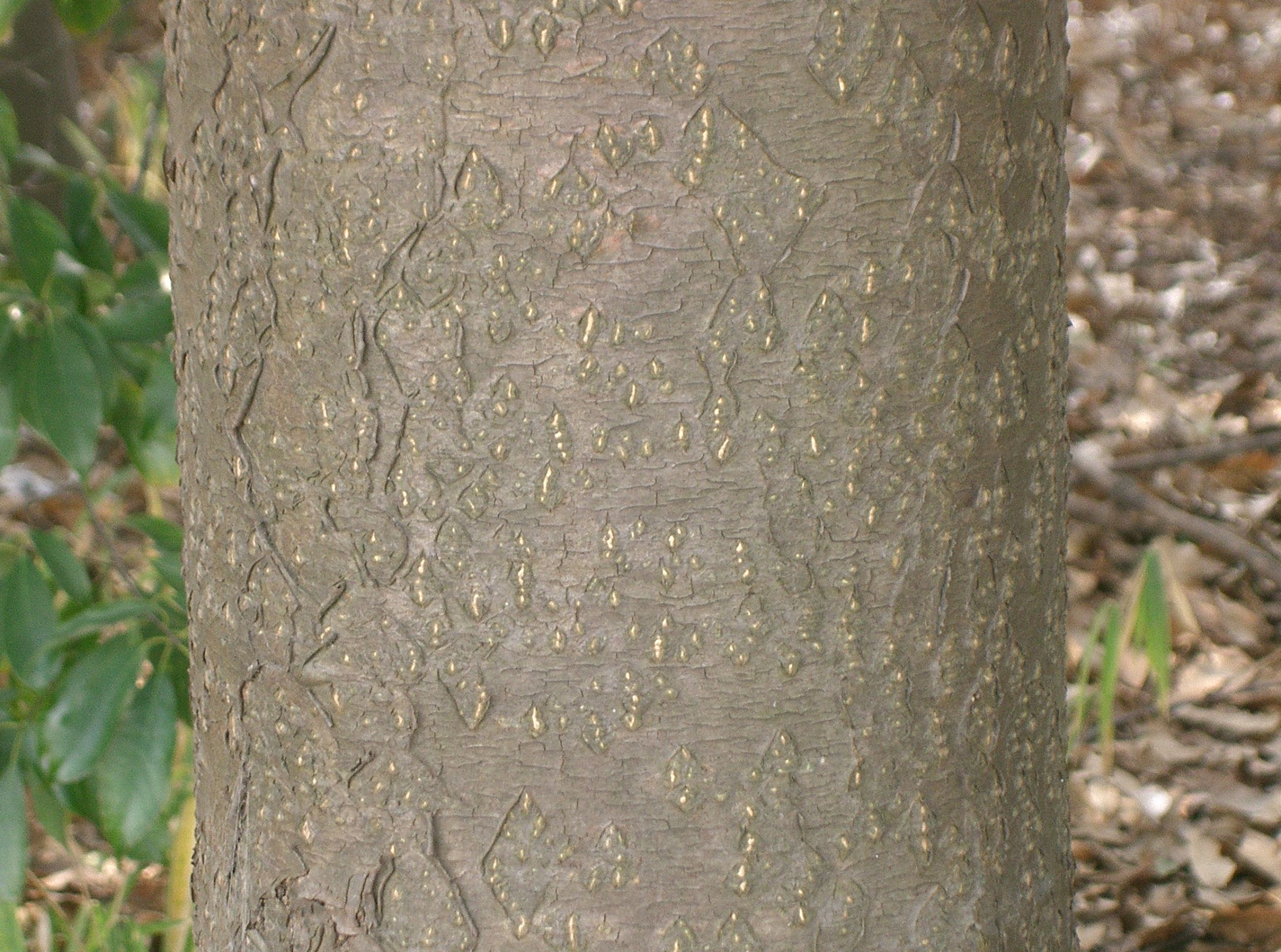
Diamond-patterned bark of mature tree trunk
