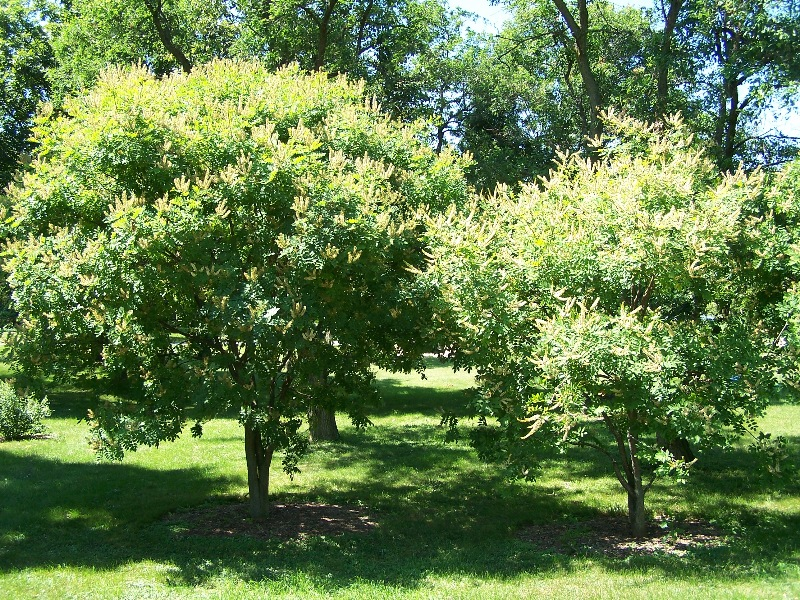
- Maackia amurensis

Scientific classification
- Kingdom: Plantae
- Clade: Embryophytes
- Clade: Tracheophytes
- Clade: Spermatophytes
- Clade: Angiosperms
- Clade: Eudicots
- Clade: Rosids
- Order: Fabales
- Family: Fabaceae
- Subfamily: Faboideae
- Tribe: Sophoreae
- Genus: Maackia; Rupr. (1856)

Species
- 9; see text

Synonyms
- Buergeria Miq. (1867)

= Maackia =

Genus of legumes

Maackia is a genus of flowering plants in the legume family, Fabaceae. There are 9 species, all native to eastern Asia, from China and Taiwan through Korea, Japan, and the Russian Far East. Six species are endemic to China. The generic name honors the botanist Richard Maack.

They are deciduous trees and shrubs. The alternately arranged leaves are divided into leaflets. The inflorescence is a simple or compound raceme of many flowers. Each flower has an inflated calyx with five teeth. The white or greenish corolla has a reflexed standard petal and keel petals that are fused at the bases. The fruit is a wide or narrow, flattened legume pod containing one to five flat seeds.

== Species ==
Maackia comprises the following species:

- Maackia amurensis Rupr.—Amur maackia
  - var. amurensis Rupr.
  - var. buergeri (Maxim.) C.K.Schneid.
- Maackia australis (Dunn) Takeda
- Maackia chekiangensis S.S. Chien
- Maackia floribunda (Miq.) Takeda
- Maackia hupehensis Takeda
- Maackia hwashanensis W.T. Wang ex C.W. Chang
- Maackia taiwanensis Hoshi & Ohashi.
- Maackia tashiroi (Yatabe) Makino
- Maackia tenuifolia (Hemsl.) Hand.-Mazz.
