= Maackia taiwanensis =

Conservation status
- Endangered (IUCN 2.3)

Scientific classification
- Kingdom: Plantae
- Clade: Tracheophytes
- Clade: Angiosperms
- Clade: Eudicots
- Clade: Rosids
- Order: Fabales
- Family: Fabaceae
- Subfamily: Faboideae
- Genus: Maackia
- Species: M. taiwanensis

Binomial name
- Maackia taiwanensis H.Hoshi & H.Ohashi

Species of legume

Maackia taiwanensis is a species of legume in the family Fabaceae. It is a small tree up to 10 metres (33 ft) tall found only in Yangmingshan area in northern Taiwan.
