= Retusin (isoflavone) =

- Chemical structure of retusin

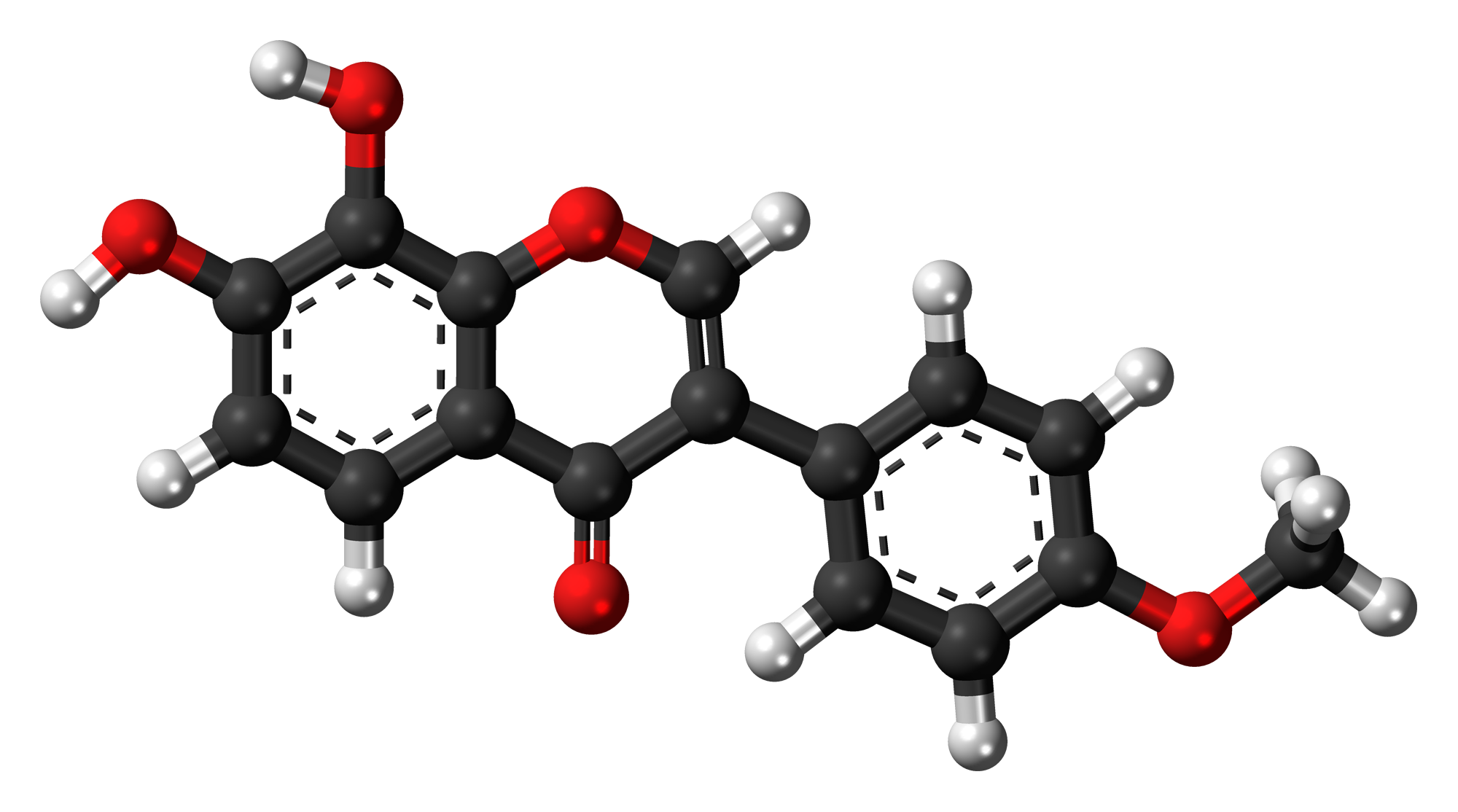

Names
- IUPAC name 7,8-Dihydroxy-4′-methoxyisoflavone
- Systematic IUPAC name 7,8-Dihydroxy-3-(4-methoxyphenyl)-4H-1-benzopyran-4-one

Identifiers
CAS Number	37816-19-6
3D model (JSmol)	Interactive image
ChEMBL	ChEMBL1290231
ChemSpider	4587189
PubChem CID	5481240
CompTox Dashboard (EPA)	DTXSID30420499
- InChI: InChI=1S/C16H12O5/c1-20-10-4-2-9(3-5-10)12-8-21-16-11(14(12)18)6-7-13(17)15(16)19/h2-8,17,19H,1H3 Key: DLXIJJURUIXRFK-UHFFFAOYSA-N; InChI=1/C16H12O5/c1-20-10-4-2-9(3-5-10)12-8-21-16-11(14(12)18)6-7-13(17)15(16)19/h2-8,17,19H,1H3 Key: DLXIJJURUIXRFK-UHFFFAOYAG
- SMILES: COC1=CC=C(C=C1)C2=COC3=C(C2=O)C=CC(=C3O)O

Properties
Chemical formula	C_{16}H_{12}O_{5}
Molar mass	284.26 g/mol
- Except where otherwise noted, data are given for materials in their standard state (at 25 °C [77 °F], 100 kPa). verify (what is ?) Infobox references

Retusin is an O-methylated isoflavone, a type of flavonoid. It can be found in Fabaceae species like Dipteryx odorata, in Dalbergia retusa and in Millettia nitida. It can also be found in Maackia amurensis cell cultures.
