= Ononin =

Names
- IUPAC name 7-(β-D-Glucopyranosyloxy)-4′-methoxyisoflavone
- Systematic IUPAC name 3-(4-Methoxyphenyl)-7-{[(2S,3R,4S,5S,6R)-3,4,5-trihydroxy-6-(hydroxymethyl)oxan-2-yl]oxy}-4H-1-benzopyran-4-one
- Other names Formononetin glucoside Formononetin-7-glucoside; Formononetin 7-O-glucoside

Identifiers
CAS Number	486-62-4
3D model (JSmol)	Interactive image; Interactive image
ChEBI	CHEBI:7775
ChEMBL	ChEMBL465980
ChemSpider	391135
KEGG	C10509
PubChem CID	442813
UNII	Z0Z637970U
CompTox Dashboard (EPA)	DTXSID70964089
- InChI: InChI=1S/C22H22O9/c1-28-12-4-2-11(3-5-12)15-10-29-16-8-13(6-7-14(16)18(15)24)30-22-21(27)20(26)19(25)17(9-23)31-22/h2-8,10,17,19-23,25-27H,9H2,1H3/t17-,19-,20+,21-,22-/m1/s1 Key: MGJLSBDCWOSMHL-MIUGBVLSSA-N; InChI=1/C22H22O9/c1-28-12-4-2-11(3-5-12)15-10-29-16-8-13(6-7-14(16)18(15)24)30-22-21(27)20(26)19(25)17(9-23)31-22/h2-8,10,17,19-23,25-27H,9H2,1H3/t17-,19-,20+,21-,22-/m1/s1 Key: MGJLSBDCWOSMHL-MIUGBVLSBD
- SMILES: COC1=CC=C(C=C1)C2=COC3=C(C2=O)C=CC(=C3)OC4C(C(C(C(O4)CO)O)O)O; COc1ccc(cc1)c2coc3cc(ccc3c2=O)O[C@H]4[C@@H]([C@H]([C@@H]([C@H](O4)CO)O)O)O

Properties
Chemical formula	C_{22}H_{22}O_{9}
Molar mass	430.409 g·mol^{−1}
- Except where otherwise noted, data are given for materials in their standard state (at 25 °C [77 °F], 100 kPa). verify (what is ?) Infobox references

Ononin is an isoflavone glycoside, the 7-O-β-D-glucopyranoside of formononetin, which in turn is the 4'-O-methyl (4'-methoxy) derivative of the parent isoflavone daidzein.

== Natural sources ==
Ononin is a major isoflavone found in a number of plants and herbs like soybean, Astragalus root, and Glycyrrhiza uralensis.

== Pharmacokinetics ==
Intestinal bacterial metabolic pathways may include demethylation and deglycosylation. It follows that formation of formononetin and/or daidzein is possible.

== Pharmacodynamics ==
An in vitro anti-inflammatory effect on lipopolysaccharide (LPS)-induced inflammation has been demonstrated in one study.
