= Formononetin =

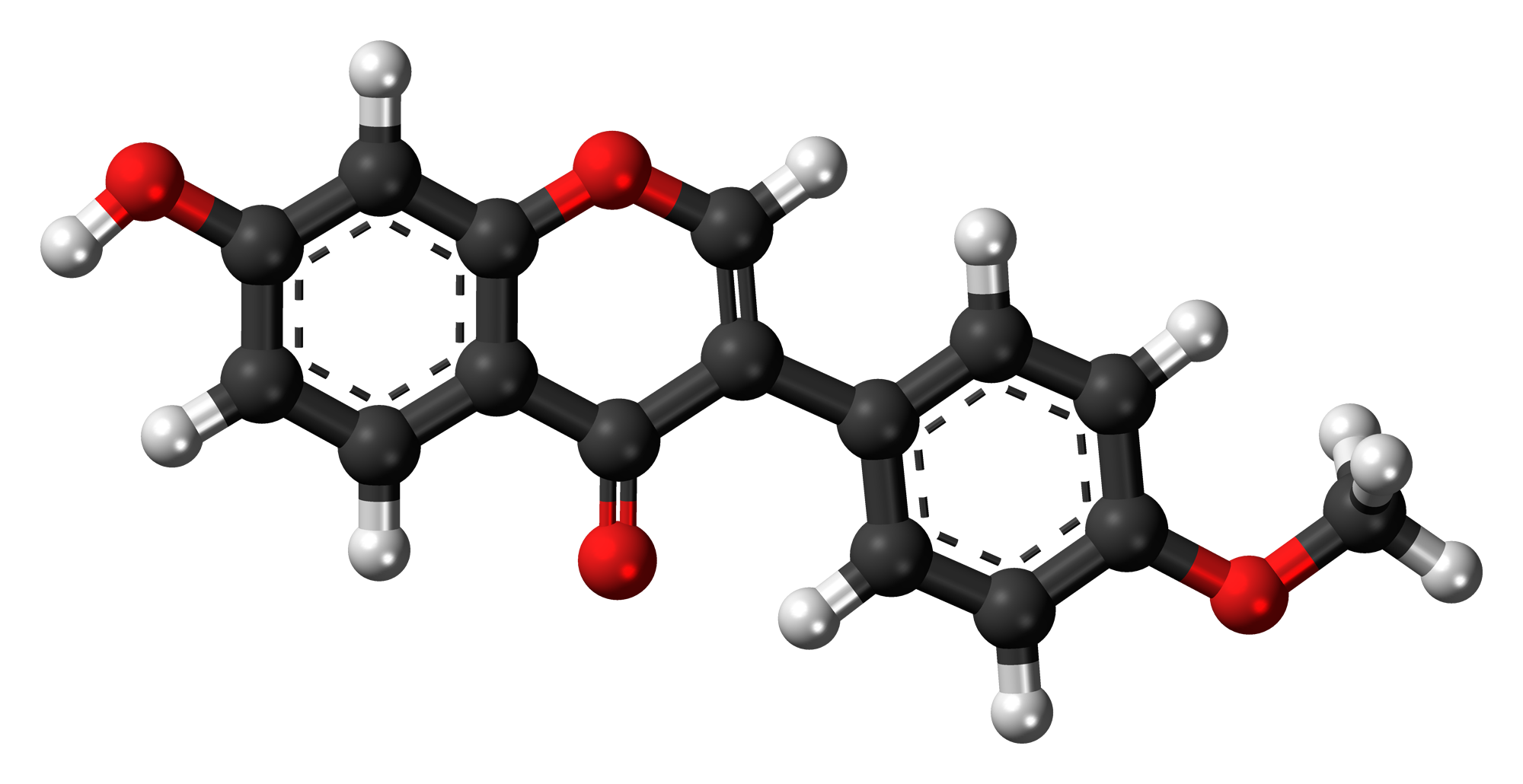

Names
- IUPAC name 7-Hydroxy-4′-methoxyisoflavone
- Systematic IUPAC name 7-Hydroxy-3-(4-methoxyphenyl)-4H-1-benzopyran-4-one
- Other names Biochanin B Formononetol; 4'-O-methyldaidzein

Identifiers
CAS Number	485-72-3
3D model (JSmol)	Interactive image
Beilstein Reference	237979
ChEBI	CHEBI:18088
ChEMBL	ChEMBL242341
ChemSpider	4444070
ECHA InfoCard	100.006.931
KEGG	C00858
PubChem CID	5280378
UNII	295DQC67BJ
CompTox Dashboard (EPA)	DTXSID4022311
- InChI: InChI=1S/C16H12O4/c1-19-12-5-2-10(3-6-12)14-9-20-15-8-11(17)4-7-13(15)16(14)18/h2-9,17H,1H3 Key: HKQYGTCOTHHOMP-UHFFFAOYSA-N; InChI=1/C16H12O4/c1-19-12-5-2-10(3-6-12)14-9-20-15-8-11(17)4-7-13(15)16(14)18/h2-9,17H,1H3 Key: HKQYGTCOTHHOMP-UHFFFAOYAJ
- SMILES: O=C\1c3c(O/C=C/1c2ccc(OC)cc2)cc(O)cc3

Properties
Chemical formula	C_{16}H_{12}O_{4}
Molar mass	268.26 g/mol
- Except where otherwise noted, data are given for materials in their standard state (at 25 °C [77 °F], 100 kPa). verify (what is ?) Infobox references

Formononetin is an O-methylated isoflavone.

== Natural occurrences ==
Formononetin is found in a number of plants and herbs such as red clover. Along with other phytoestrogens, it predominantly occurs in leguminous plants and Fabaceae, particularly in beans, such as green beans, lima beans, soy and many others, as the free aglycone or in form of its glucoside ononin.

It can also be found in Maackia amurensis cell cultures.

== Pharmacodynamics ==
Formononetin promotes angiogenesis. It is also involved in expressing the gene and proteins that are needed to make IgE.

== Derivatives ==
Ononin is the 7-O-β-D-glucopyranoside of formononetin.
