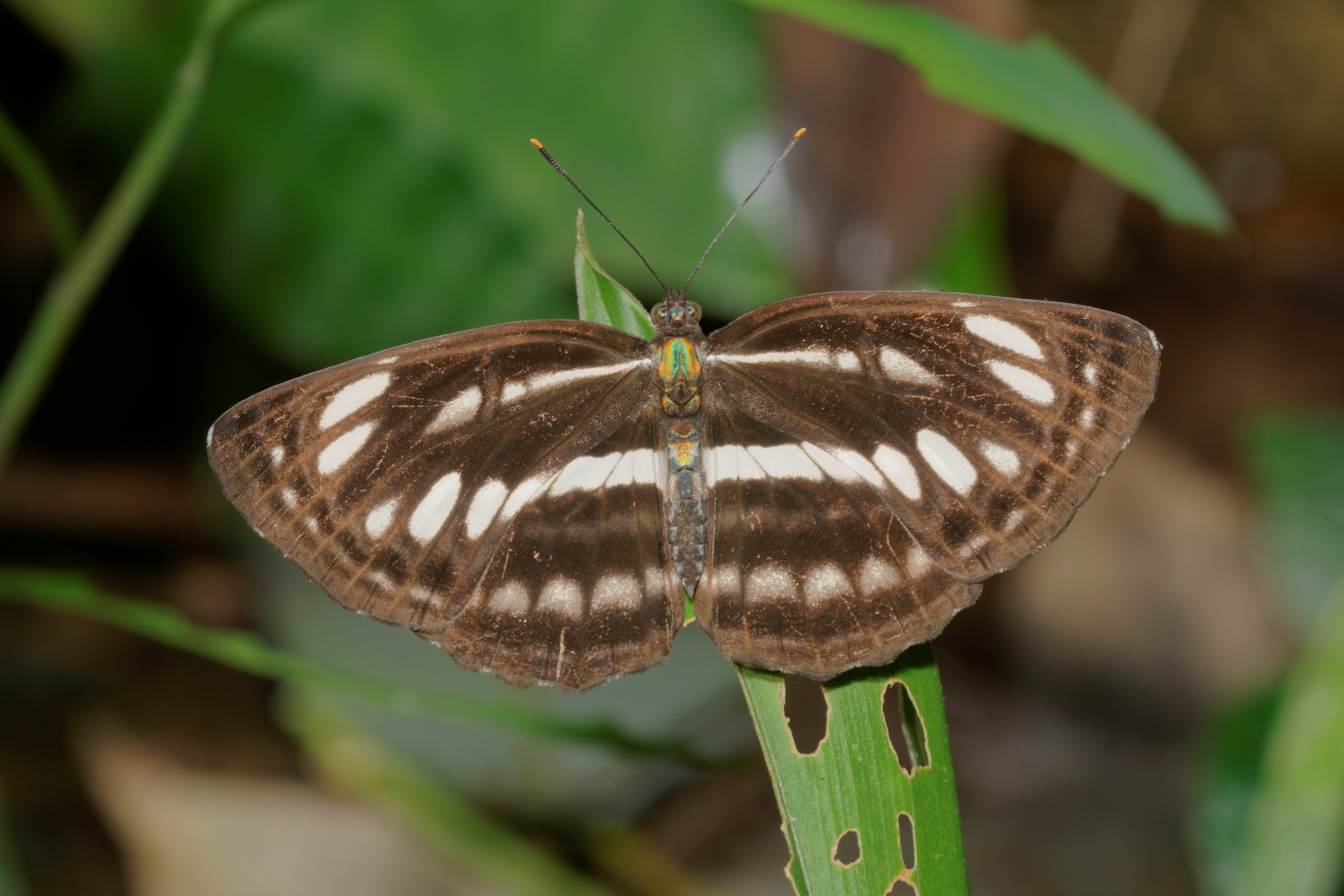

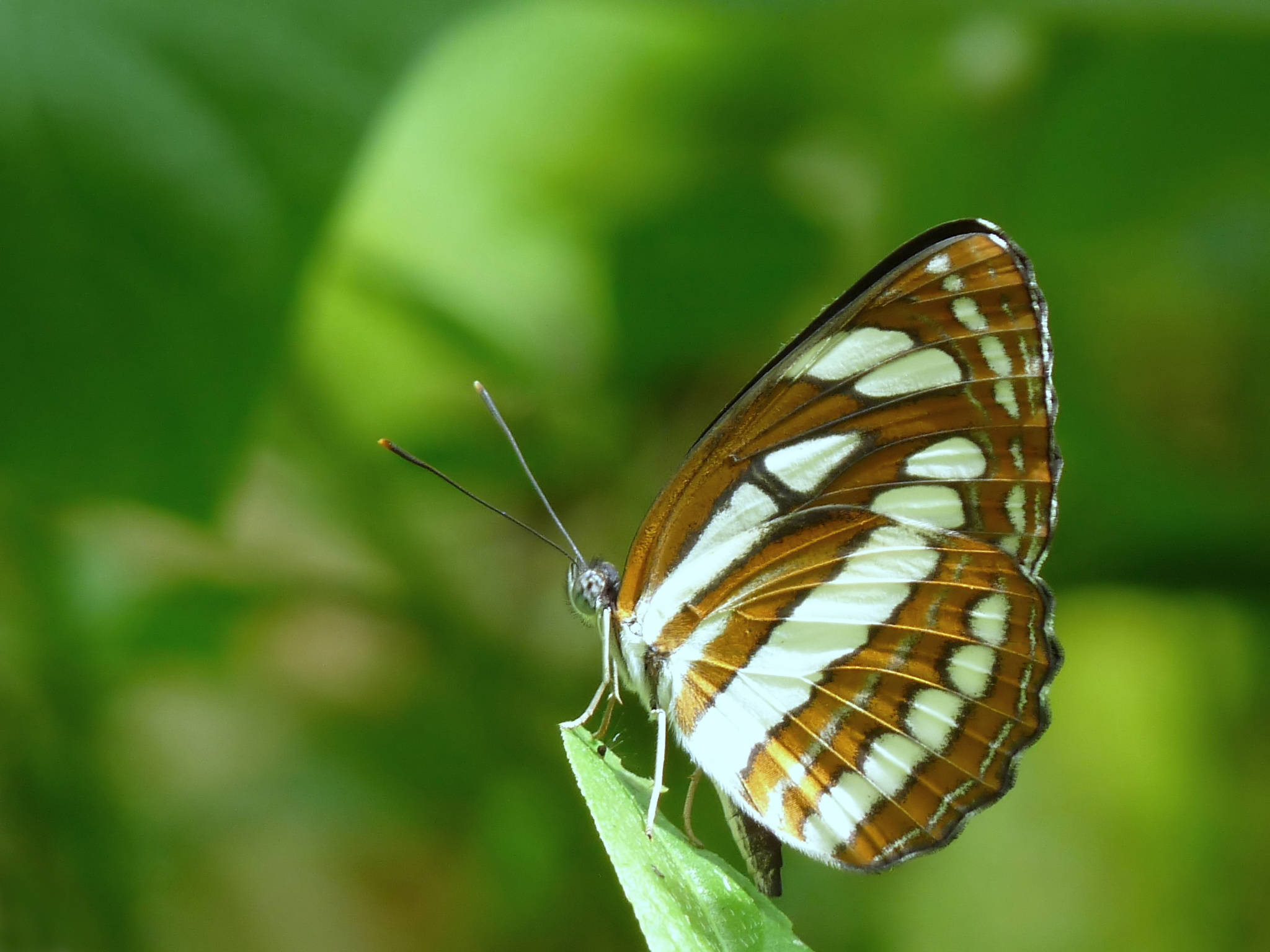
- both N. h. varmona

Scientific classification
- Kingdom: Animalia
- Phylum: Arthropoda
- Class: Insecta
- Order: Lepidoptera
- Family: Nymphalidae
- Genus: Neptis
- Species: N. hylas

Binomial name
- Neptis hylas (Linnaeus, 1758)

Synonyms
- Neptis varmona, Moore, 1872; Neptis eurynome (Westwood, 1842)

= Neptis hylas =

Common sailor

Species of butterfly

Neptis hylas, the common sailor, is a species of nymphalid butterfly found in the Indian subcontinent and southeast Asia. It has a characteristic stiff gliding flight achieved by short and shallow wingbeats just above the horizontal. It is also present in Italy in a humid limited zone near Gorizia and Slovenia. Bengali name: চরবাতাসি

== Description ==
Dry-season form - Upperside black, with pure white markings. Forewing discoidal streak clavate (club shaped), apically truncate, subapically either notched or sometimes indistinctly divided; triangular spot beyond broad, well defined, acute at apex, but not elongate; discal series of spots separate, not connate (united), each about twice as long as broad; postdiscal transverse series of small spots incomplete, but some are always present. Hindwing: subbasal band of even or nearly oven width; discal and subterminal pale lines obscure; postdiscal series of spots well separated, quadrate or subquadrate, very seldom narrow. Underside from pale golden ochraceous to dark ochraceous almost chocolate; white markings as on the upperside, but broader and defined in black. Forewing: interspaces 1a and 1 from base to near the apex shaded with black, some narrow transverse white markings on either side of the transverse postdiscal series of small spots. Hindwing a streak of white on costal margin at base, a more slender white streak below it; the discal and subterminal pale lines of the upperside replaced by narrow white lines with still narrower margins of black. Antennae, head, thorax and abdomen black; the palpi, thorax and abdomen beneath dusky white.

Wet-season form - Differs only in the narrowness of the white markings and in the slightly darker ground colour and broader black margins to the spots and bands on the underside.

More than 20 subspecies have been described.

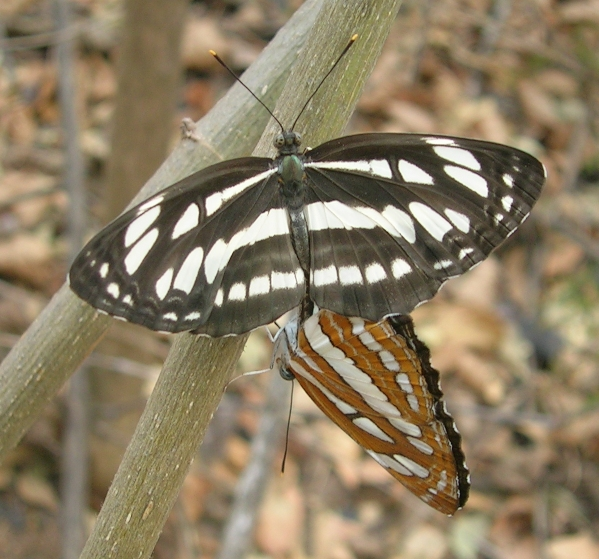
Mating pair, Bangalore, India

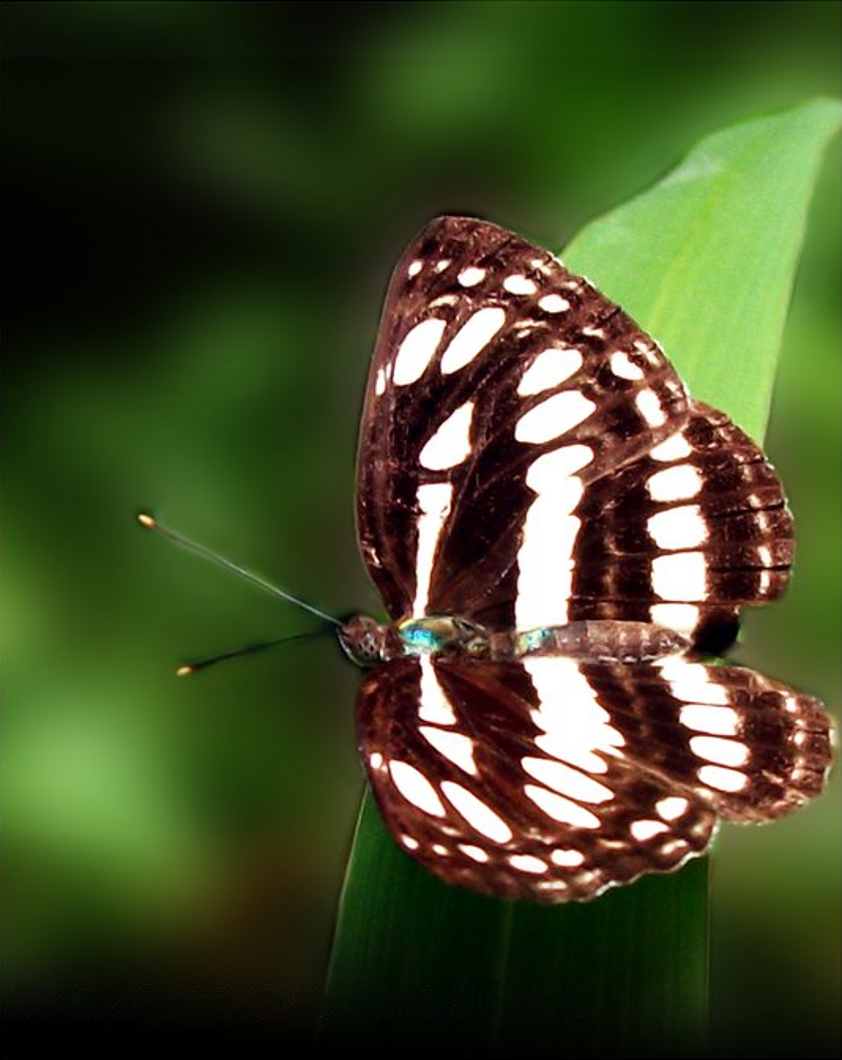
In Dumbara, Rathnapura, Sri Lanka

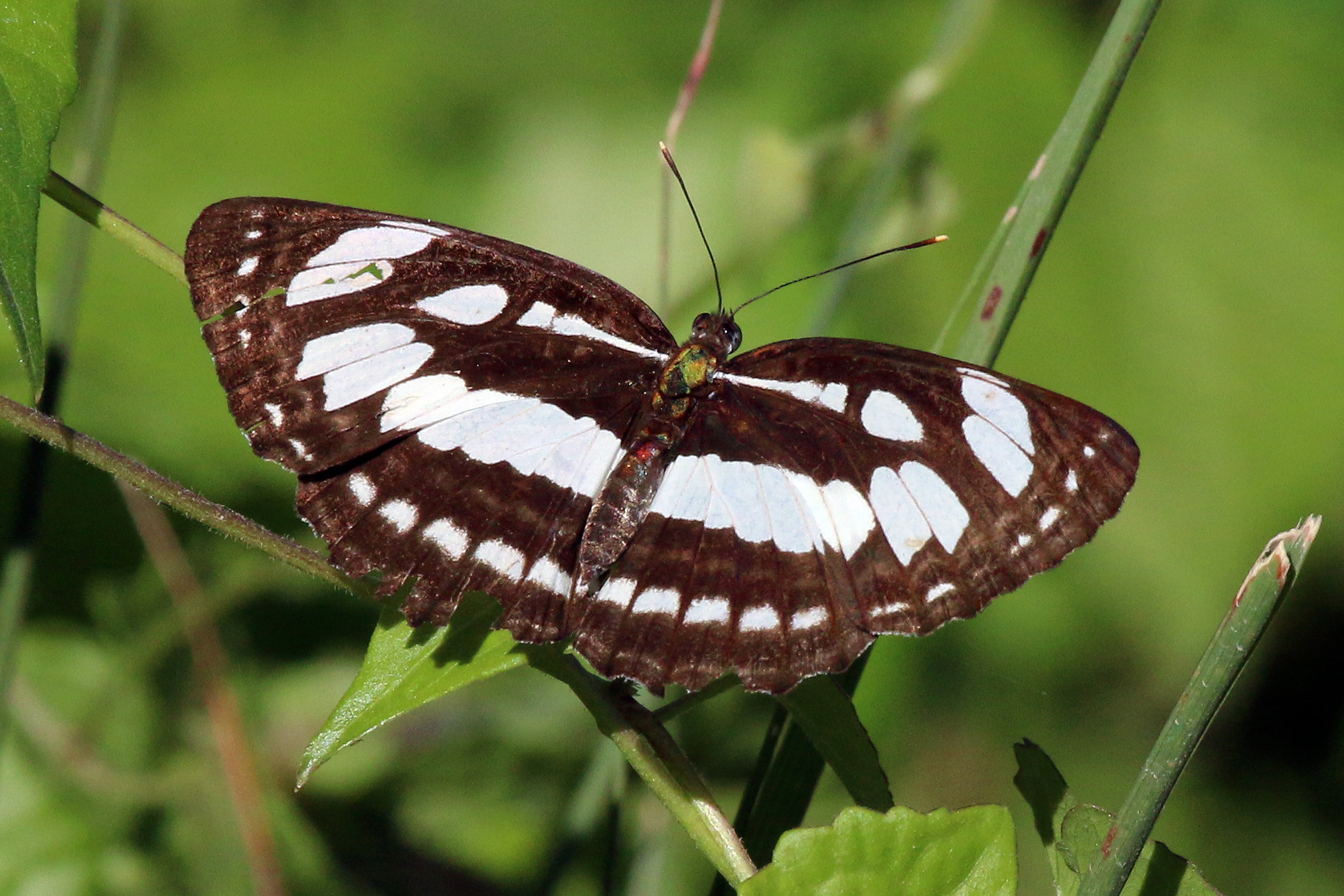
N. h. matuta
Bali, Indonesia

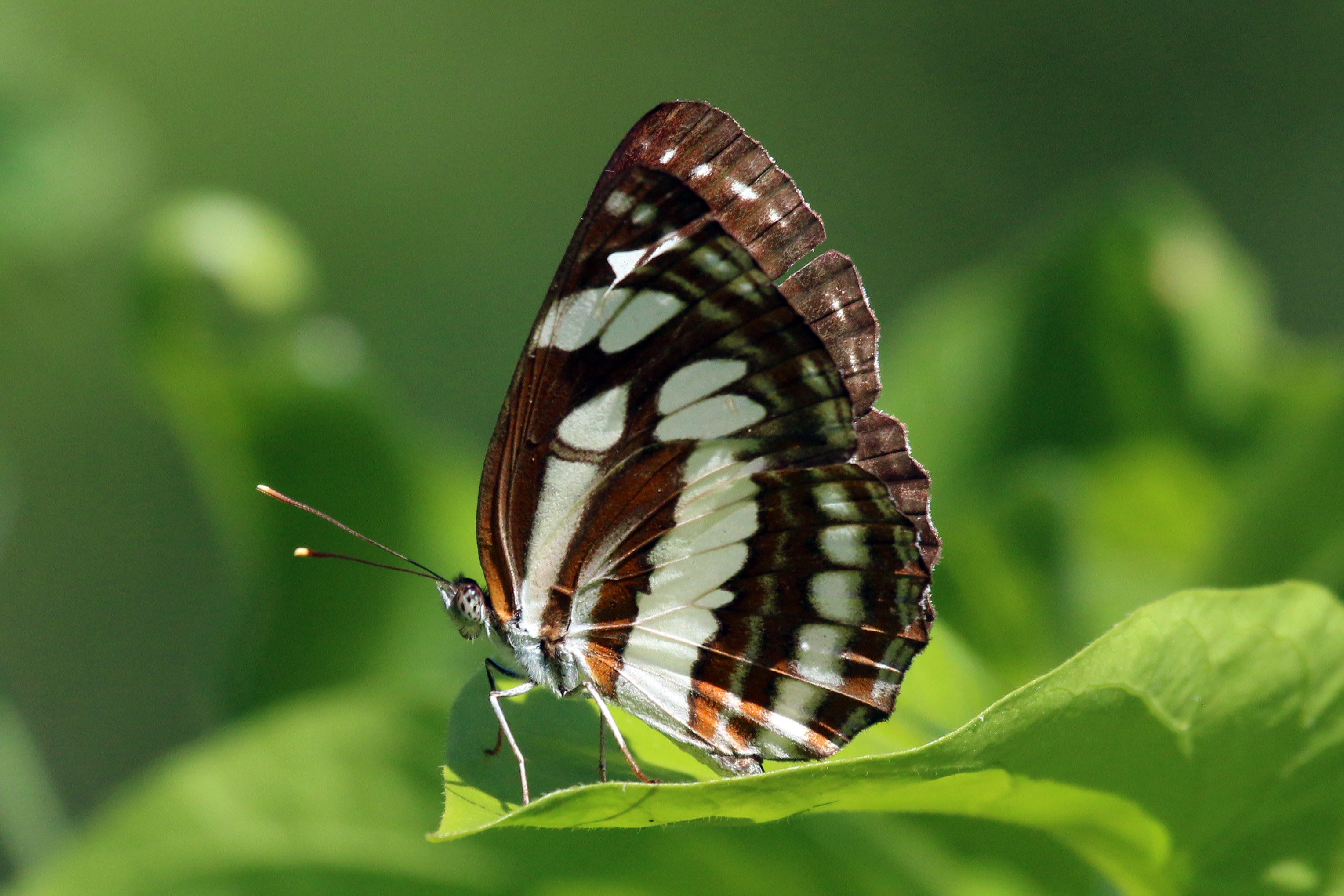
N. h. matuta
Bali, Indonesia

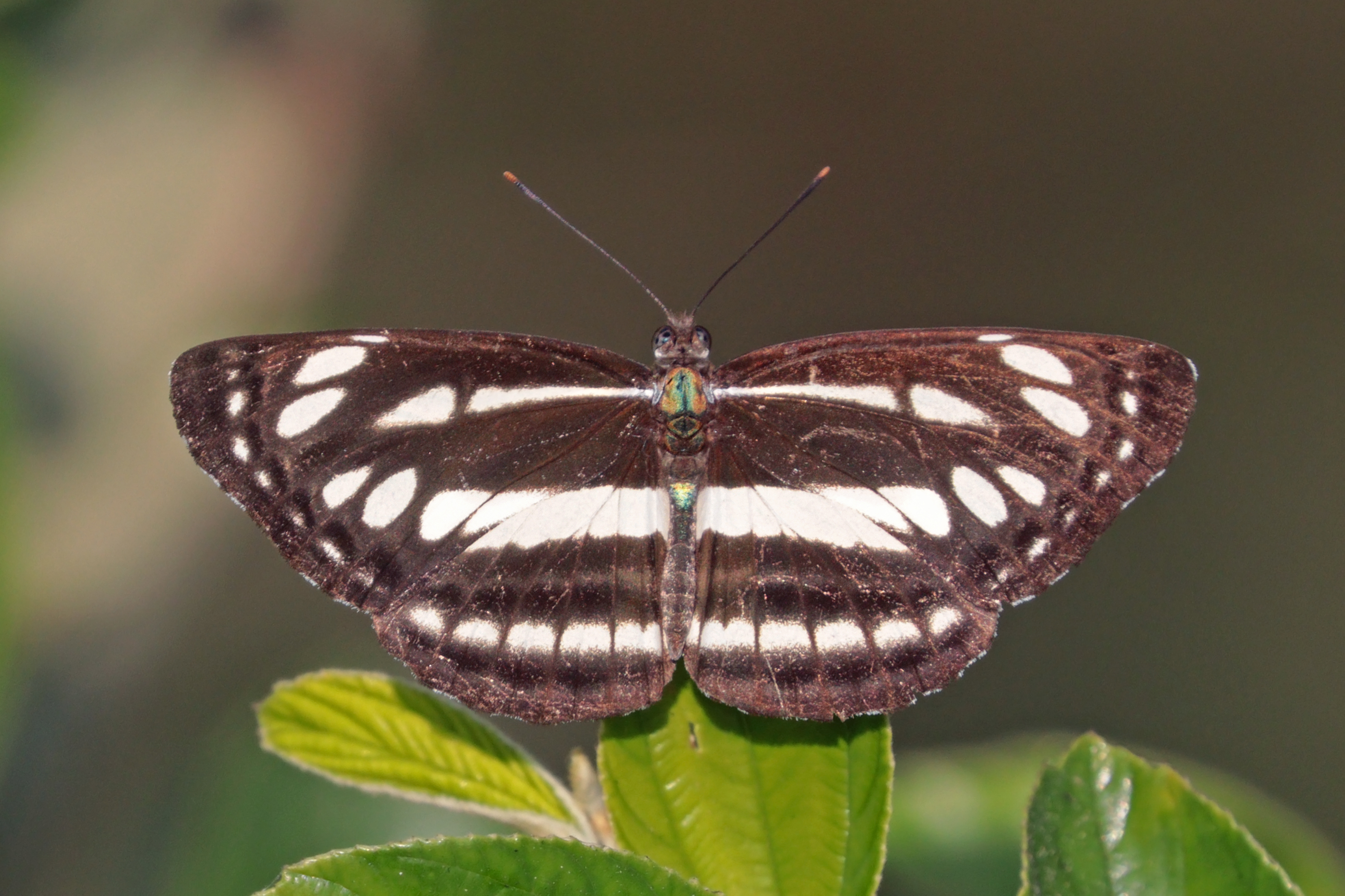
male N. h. kamarupa
Nepal

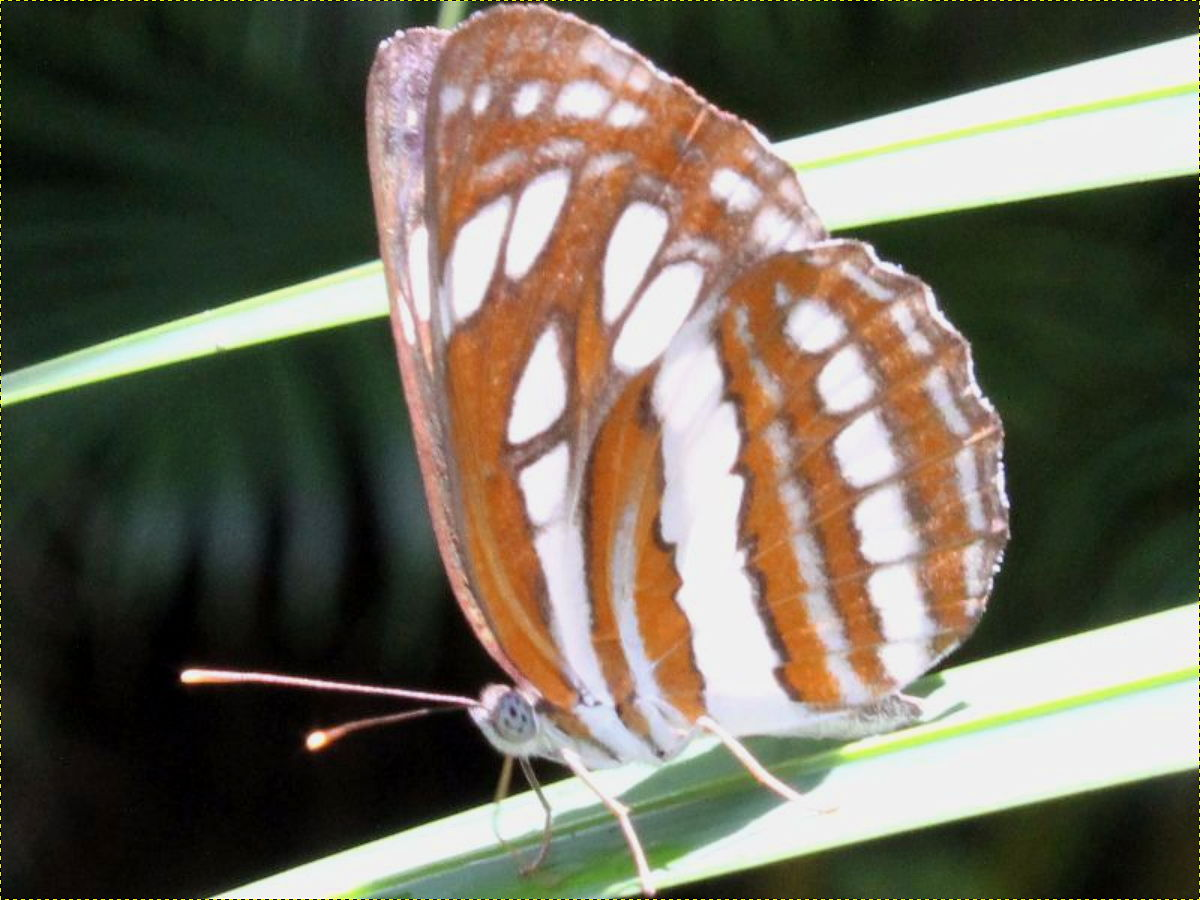
N. h. luculenta
Taiwan

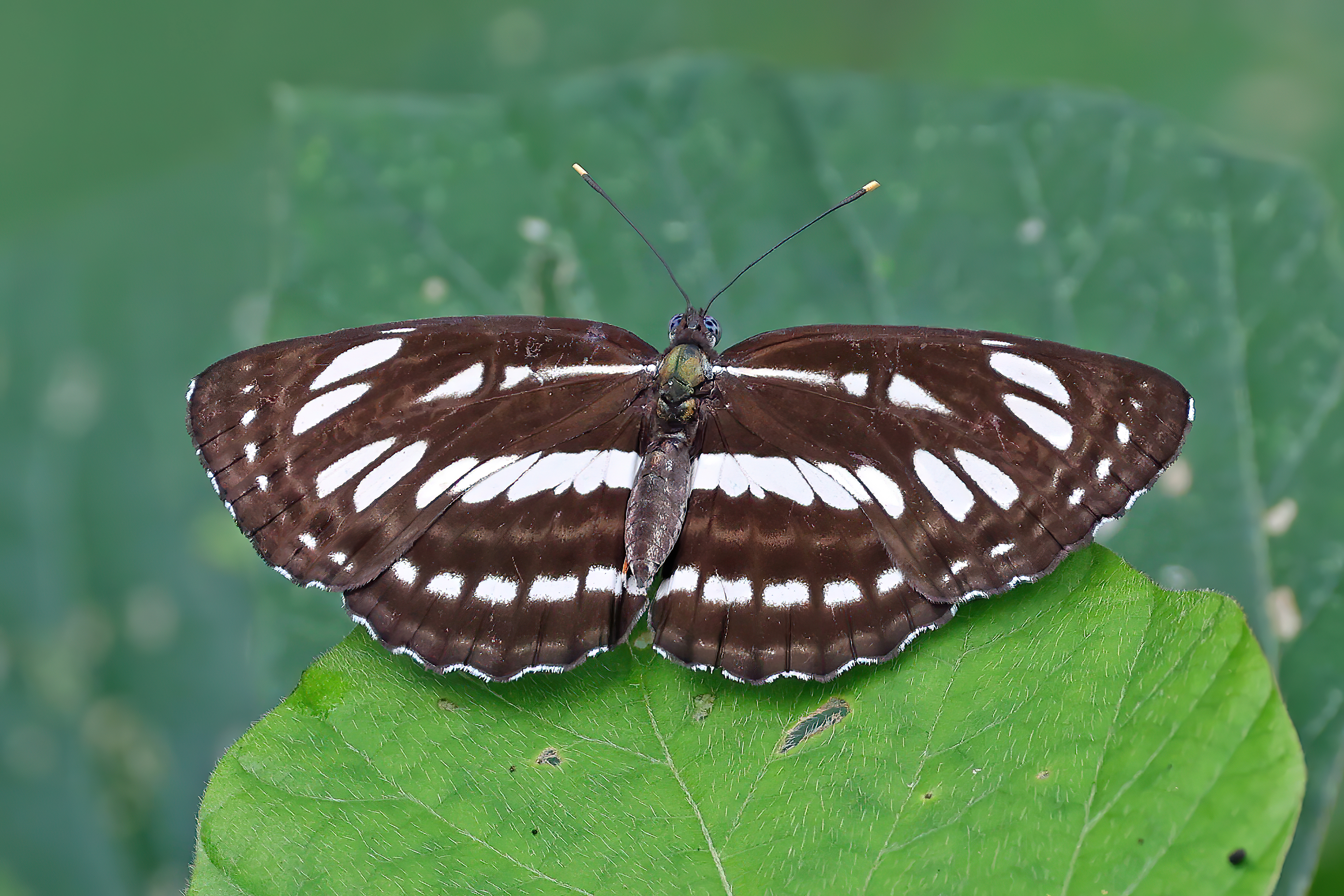
N. h. papaja
Phuket, Thailand

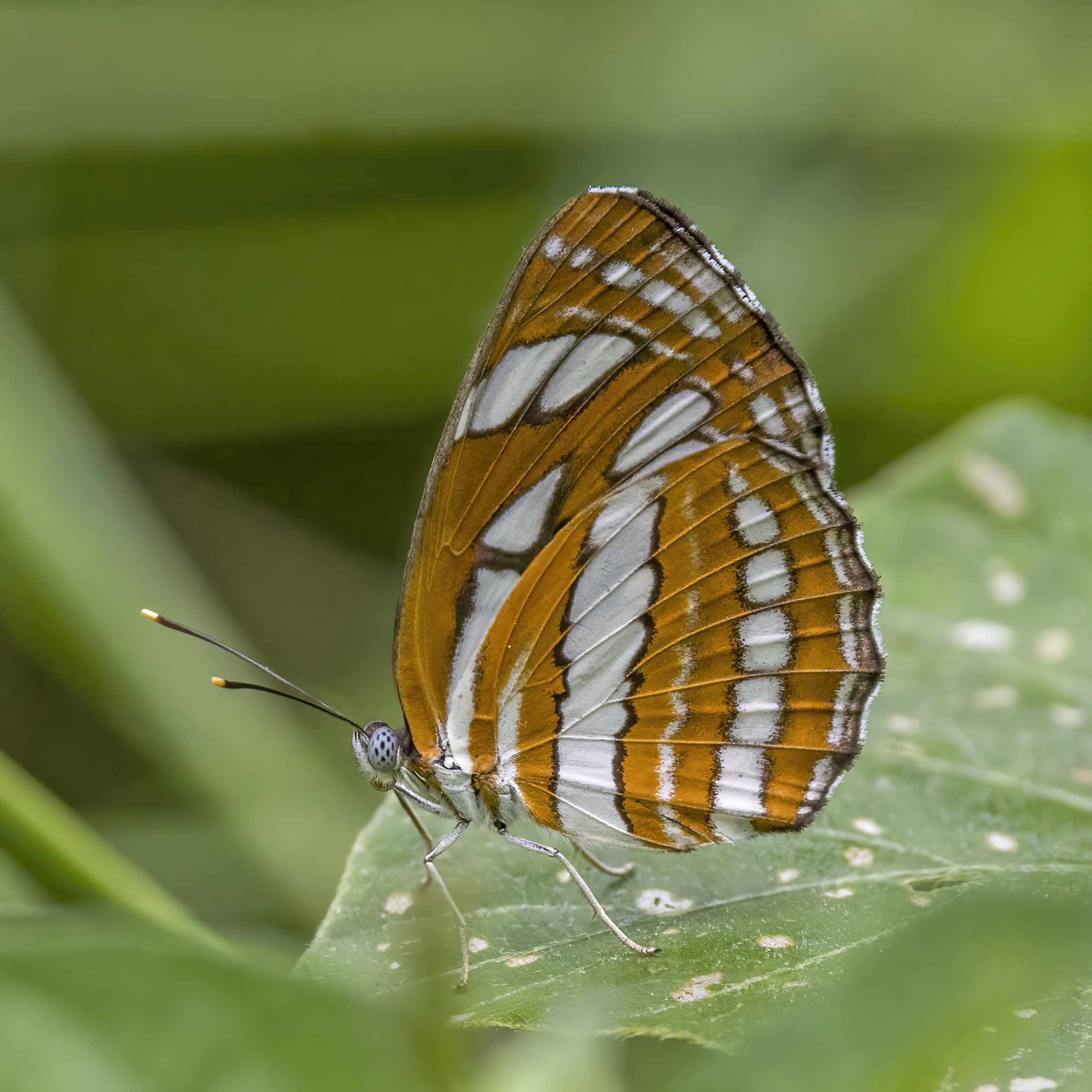
N. h. papaja
Phuket, Thailand

This species has been observed to make sounds whose function has not been established.

== Distribution ==
Throughout continental India; Sri Lanka; Assam; Nepal; Myanmar (Tenasserim), extending to China and Indomalaya.

== Life history ==
=== Larva ===
Race varmona = eurynome. Frederic Moore describes this from a drawing by Samuel Neville Ward as follows:

"Head larger than the anterior segment, vertex with two short pointed spines, cheeks obtusely spined; third, fourth, sixth and twelfth segments armed with a subdorsal pair of stout fleshy spiny processes, those on the fourth segment longest. Colour pale green; face, the tip of processes and segments slightly washed with pale pinkish, a slight pinkish oblique lateral fascia from an anal process; a small, dark, lateral spot on the sixth segment."

=== Pupa ===
"Rather short; head-piece bluntly cleft in front, vertex pointed; thorax dorsally prominent and angular; dorsum angular at base; abdominal segments slightly angled dorsally; wing-cases somewhat dilated laterally. Colour pale brownish-ochreous, with lateral thoracic golden spots."

== Larval Host Plants ==
- Bombax
- Bombax ceiba
- Hevea brasiliensis
- Fabaceae
- Canavalia ensiformis
- Urena lobata
- Flemingia
- Lathyrus
- Mucuna purpurea
- Paracalyx
- Paracalyx scariosus
- Rhynchosia
- Vigna cylindrica
- Vigna unguiculata
- Xylia xylocarpa
- Nothapodytes nimmoniana
- Malvaceae
- Corchorus
- Helicteres isora
- Triumfetta
