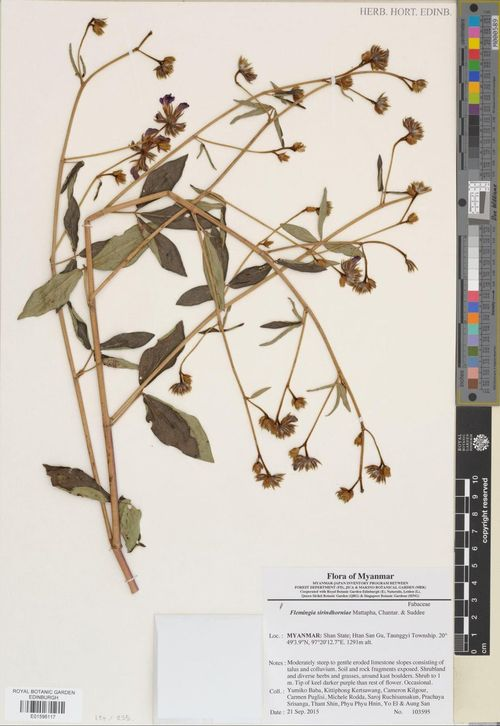

Scientific classification
- Kingdom: Plantae
- Clade: Embryophytes
- Clade: Tracheophytes
- Clade: Spermatophytes
- Clade: Angiosperms
- Clade: Eudicots
- Clade: Rosids
- Order: Fabales
- Family: Fabaceae
- Subfamily: Faboideae
- Genus: Flemingia
- Species: F. sirindhorniae

Binomial name
- Flemingia sirindhorniae Mattapha, Chantar. & Suddee

= Flemingia sirindhorniae =

Species of flowering plant

Flemingia sirindhorniae is a species of flowering plant in the family Fabaceae. F. sirindhorniae is a perennial herb, with purple or pink flowers. It is known only from Thailand, and was named after the Thai royal Sirindhorn.

== Distribution ==
The species is native to north western Thailand. It grows primarily in seasonally dry, tropical areas. The species is rare, and known only from Thailand.

== Taxonomy ==
The species was first described in 2017.

It was first described from specimens collected in 2014, in Thailand's Tak Province. The specimens were found growing on a limestone mountain, at an elevation of 900 metres (3,000 ft).

== Description ==
Flemingia sirindhorniae is a perennial herb, around 60 centimetres (2.0 ft) high. It resembles Flemingia involucrata and Flemingia vestita.

The plant has one to three compound leaves, which allow it to be distinguished from other species of Flemingia. The leaves are arranged in a spiral. The leaf stalk is 2–3 centimetres (0.79–1.18 in) long. The plant has ovate leaflets. The leaves are leathery in texture.

The infloresences grow up to 6 centimetres (2.4 in) long, and have four to seven flowers each. The petals are dark purple or pink. The fruits are 4–6 millimetres (0.16–0.24 in) by 5–7 millimetres (0.20–0.28 in) in size, densely hairy, and have one or two seeds. The seeds are 2.5 millimetres (0.098 in) by 3 millimetres (0.12 in) in size.

The species flowers from August to October, and fruits from November to December.

== Etymology ==
The species is named for the Thai Royal Sirindhorn, recognising her work on plant conservation. Sirindhorn reportedly provided the plant's Vietnamese common name, เทพมาศ (Thep-pa-mat).
