= Abyssinia =

Region usually restricted to the northern highlands of Ethiopia and Eritrea

Abyssinia ሐበሠተ (Ge'ez) الحبشة (Arabic)
- Historical region
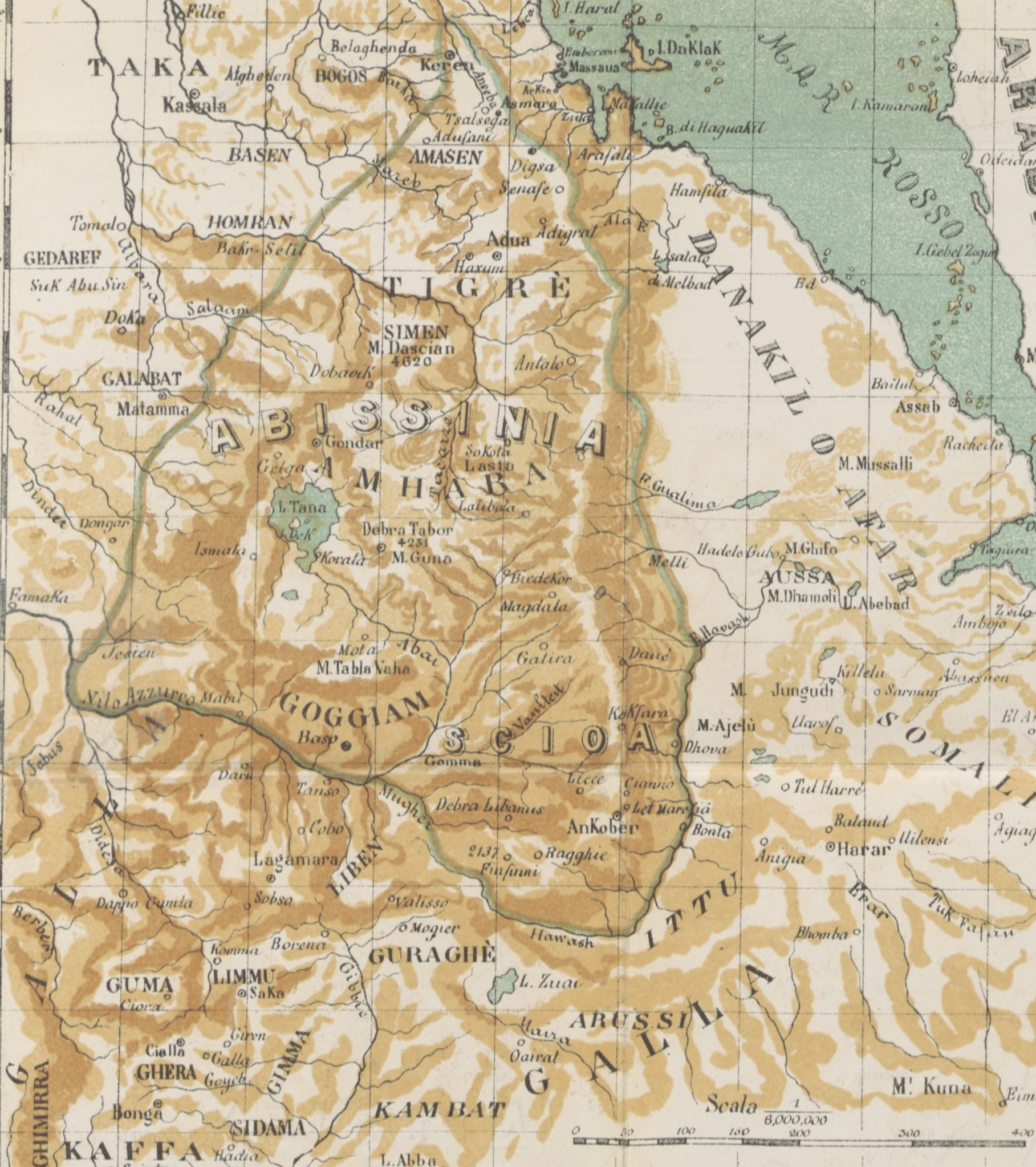
- 1887 Italian map of Abyssinia
- Country: Ethiopia; Eritrea

Abyssinia (/æbɪˈsɪniə/; also known as Abyssinie, Abissinia, Habessinien, or Al-Habash) is a term that referred to a region in the Horn of Africa, usually situated in the northern highlands of modern-day Ethiopia and Eritrea. The term and its derivatives were widely used internationally as an official synonym for Ethiopia until the mid-20th century. A derivative ethnonym, Abyssinian, was often used to refer to the Ethio-Semitic-speaking inhabitants of the highlands of Ethiopia and Eritrea.

== Philology ==
The origin of the term might be found in Egyptian hieroglyphs as the designation of a southern region near the Red Sea that produced incense, known as ḫbś.tj.w, "the bearded ones" (i.e. Punt). This etymological connection was first pointed out by Wilhelm Max Müller and Eduard Glaser in 1893.

In South Arabian texts, the name ḤBS²T appears in various inscriptions. One of the earliest known local uses of the term dates to the second or third century in a Sabaean inscription recounting the nəgus ("king") GDRT. Another Sabaean inscription mentions mlky Ḥbst Dtwns w-Zqrns ("kings of Habashat, DTWNS and ZQRNS") and refers to Aksum and ḤBŠT. The Ezana Stone also names King Ezana as "king of the Ethiopians", which appears in other Sabaean texts as ḤBS²TM or "Habessinien".

The Hellenized name of Habessinien, ABACIIN, appears on an Aksumite coin of c. 400 AD and shortly afterwards in Late Latin in the form Abissensis. The 6th-century author Stephanus of Byzantium used the term "Αβασηνοί" (i.e. Abasēnoi) to refer to "an Arabian people living next to the Sabaeans together with the Ḥaḍramites." The region of the Abasēnoi produced myrrh, incense and cotton, and they cultivated a plant that yielded a purple dye (probably wars, i.e. Flemingia grahamiana). It lay on a route from Zabīd on the coastal plain to the Ḥimyarite capital Ẓafār. Abasēnoi was located by Hermann von Wissmann as a region in the Jabal Ḥubaysh mountain in Ibb Governorate, perhaps related in etymology to the ḥbš Semitic root. Modern Western European languages, including English, appear to have borrowed this term from the post-classical form Abissini in the mid-16th century. (English Abyssin is attested from 1576, and Abissinia and Abyssinia from the 1620s.)

Al-Habash was known in Islamic literature as a Christian kingdom, most likely due to an association between the term and the Aksumite Empire. The state was famously the destination of the first hijrah, during which early followers of Muhammad fled persecution by the Quraysh tribe in Arabia. In the modern day, variations of the term are used in Turkey, Iran, and the Arab World in reference to Ethiopia and the broader Horn of Africa. The Ottomans created a province known as the Habesh Eyalet, which contained their limited holdings in Eritrea, Ethiopia, Djibouti, and Somalia.

Today, the term "Habesha" is frequently used as a pan-ethnic label by Eritrean and Ethiopian diaspora communities; primarily from the Amhara, Tigrayan-Tigrinya and Gurage peoples.

== See also ==
- Ethiopian Empire
- Ethiopian Highlands
- Habesha people
- Horn of Africa
