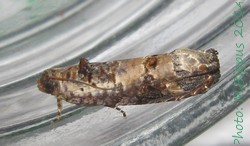

Scientific classification
- Kingdom: Animalia
- Phylum: Arthropoda
- Class: Insecta
- Order: Lepidoptera
- Family: Tortricidae
- Genus: Dudua
- Species: D. aprobola

Binomial name
- Dudua aprobola (Meyrick, 1886)

Synonyms
- Eccopsis aprobola Meyrick, 1886; Platypeplus aprobola Walsingham, in Moore, 1887; Platypeplum aprobolum Walsingham, 1900 (1899); Argyroploce aprobola Meyrick, 1910; Hedya (Platypeplus) aprobola Diakonoff, 1068; Dudua aprobol kusaiensis Clarke, 1976; Temnolopha metallota Lower, 1901

= Dudua aprobola =

Species of moth

Dudua aprobola, the mango flower webworm or litchi leaf roller, is a moth of the family Tortricidae. The species was first described by Edward Meyrick in 1886. It is a pest on several economically important crops.

== Distribution ==
It is found in Taiwan, Japan, the Seychelles, Nepal, India, the Chagos Archipelago, Sri Lanka, the Maldives, Myanmar, Vietnam, Thailand, western Malaysia, Sumatra, Java, Bali, Brunei, Kalimantan, the Philippines, Sulawesi, Buru, Ambon, New Guinea, the D'Entrecasteaux Islands, Australia, the Admiralty Islands, New Ireland, the Caroline Islands, the Gilbert Islands, Fiji, Tonga, Samoa, Réunion, Malawi and Rwanda.

== Description ==
Adult wingspan is about 19 mm.

== Larval food plants ==
- Anacardium sp.
- Arachis hypogaea
- Bidens pilosa
- Calophyllum inophyllum
- Cassia tora
- Dahlia sp.
- Eucalyptus sp.
- Eugenia jambos
- Ficus sp.
- Flemingia macrophylla
- Lagerstroemia speciosa
- Lagerstroemia sp.
- Lantana camara
- Litchi chinensis
- Loranthus sp.
- Mangifera indica
- Metrosideros collina
- Metrosideros villosa
- Nephelium litchi
- Plumbago zeylanica
- Polyalthia longifolia
- Psidium guajava
- Rosa sp.
- Salix tetrasperma
- Schleichera trijuga

== Control and management ==
Adults and caterpillars can be controlled by hand picking and pruning. Egg and larval parasitoids are also effective. Pesticides and use of Bacillus thuringiensis extracts are effective against caterpillars.
