= Dudua tetanota =

Scientific classification
- Kingdom: Animalia
- Phylum: Arthropoda
- Class: Insecta
- Order: Lepidoptera
- Family: Tortricidae
- Genus: Dudua
- Species: D. tetanota

Binomial name
- Dudua tetanota (Meyrick, 1909)

Synonyms
- Argyroploce tetanota Meyrick, 1909

Species of moth

Dudua tetanota is a moth of the family Tortricidae. It is found in Thailand and India.
