= Dudua siderea =

Scientific classification
- Domain: Eukaryota
- Kingdom: Animalia
- Phylum: Arthropoda
- Class: Insecta
- Order: Lepidoptera
- Family: Tortricidae
- Genus: Dudua
- Species: D. siderea

Binomial name
- Dudua siderea (Turner, 1916)

Synonyms
- Argyroploce siderea Turner, 1916

Species of moth

Dudua siderea is a species of moth of the family Tortricidae. It is found in Australia, where it has been recorded from Queensland.

The wingspan is about 17 mm.
