= Dudua charadraea =

Scientific classification
- Kingdom: Animalia
- Phylum: Arthropoda
- Class: Insecta
- Order: Lepidoptera
- Family: Tortricidae
- Genus: Dudua
- Species: D. charadraea

Binomial name
- Dudua charadraea (Meyrick, 1909)

Synonyms
- Argyroploce charadraea Meyrick, 1909; Platypeplus charadraea; Argyroploce ptarmicopa Meyrick, 1936

Species of moth

Dudua charadraea is a moth of the family Tortricidae first described by Edward Meyrick in 1909. It is found in Thailand, Sri Lanka, Taiwan, western Java and western Sumatra.
