= Paracalyx balfourii =

Conservation status
- Least Concern (IUCN 3.1)

Scientific classification
- Kingdom: Plantae
- Clade: Tracheophytes
- Clade: Angiosperms
- Clade: Eudicots
- Clade: Rosids
- Order: Fabales
- Family: Fabaceae
- Subfamily: Faboideae
- Genus: Paracalyx
- Species: P. balfourii

Binomial name
- Paracalyx balfourii (Vierh.) Ali (1968)

Synonyms
- Cylista balfourii Vierh. (1904); Cylista schweinfurthii R.Wagner & Vierh. (1904); Paracalyx schweinfurthii (R.Wagner & Vierh.) Ali (1968)

Species of legume

Paracalyx balfourii is a species of legume in the family Fabaceae. It is a shrub or tree endemic to Socotra and Samhah in the Socotra Archipelago of Yemen. Its natural habitats are subtropical or tropical dry forests and rocky areas.
