= Dudua brachytoma =

Scientific classification
- Domain: Eukaryota
- Kingdom: Animalia
- Phylum: Arthropoda
- Class: Insecta
- Order: Lepidoptera
- Family: Tortricidae
- Genus: Dudua
- Species: D. brachytoma

Binomial name
- Dudua brachytoma Diakonoff, 1973

Species of moth

Dudua brachytoma is a moth of the family Tortricidae. It is found in Thailand and Java.

The wingspan is 16 mm.
