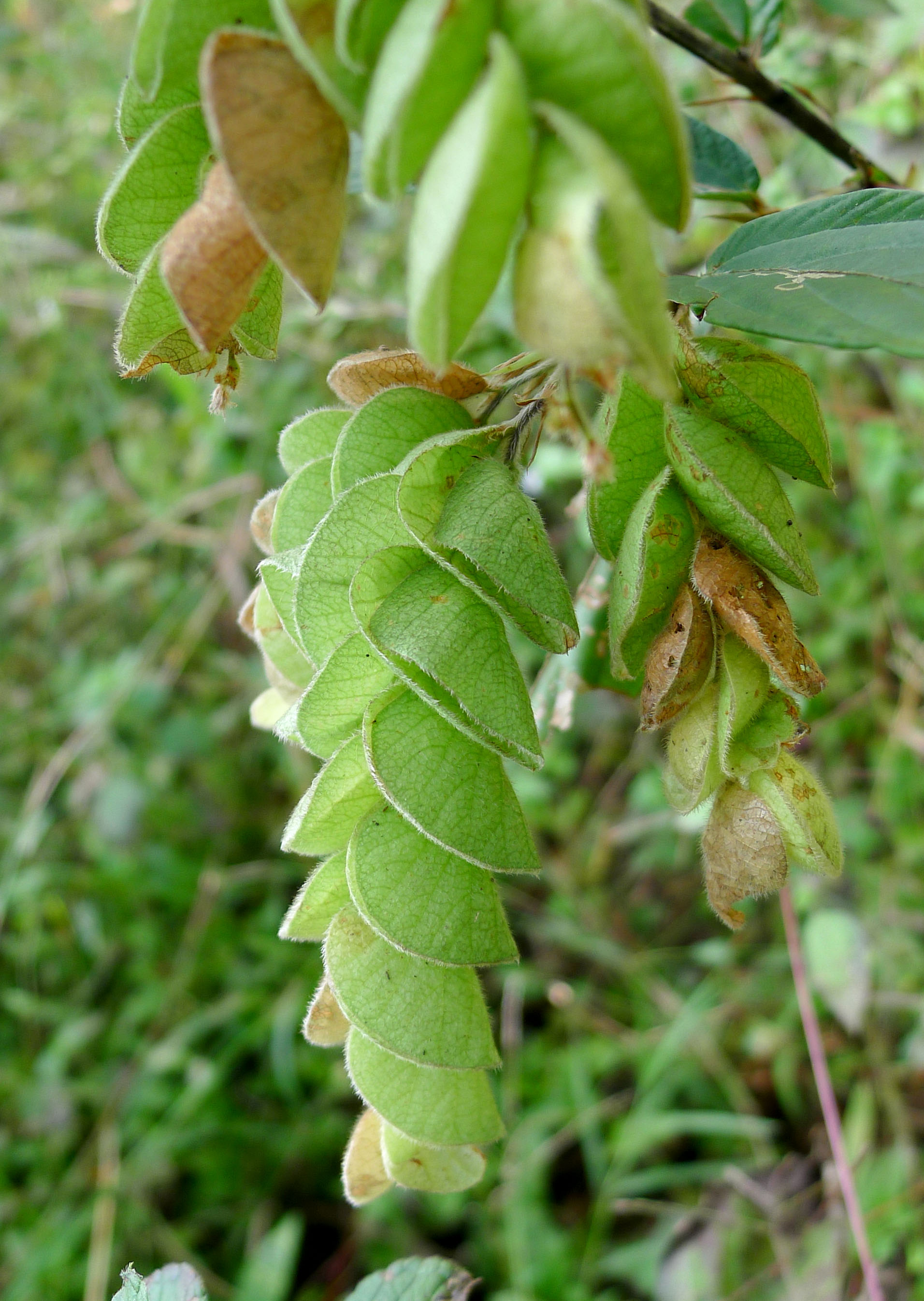
- Green bracts of inflorescence

Scientific classification
- Kingdom: Plantae
- Clade: Tracheophytes
- Clade: Angiosperms
- Clade: Eudicots
- Clade: Rosids
- Order: Fabales
- Family: Fabaceae
- Subfamily: Faboideae
- Genus: Flemingia
- Species: F. strobilifera

Binomial name
- Flemingia strobilifera (L.) W.T.Aiton

Synonyms
- Flemingia bracteata (Roxb.) Wight; Flemingia fruticulosa Benth.; Flemingia strobilifera var. bracteata (Roxb.) Baker; Flemingia strobilifera var. fruticulosa (Benth.) Baker; Hedysarum bracteatum Roxb.; Hedysarum strobiliferum L.; Moghania bracteata (Roxb.) H.L.Li; Moghania fruticulosa (Benth.) Mukerjee; Moghania strobilifera (L.) J.St.-Hil.; Moghania strobilifera (L.) Kuntze; Moghania strobilifera (L.) Jacks.; Zornia strobilifera (L.) Pers.

= Flemingia strobilifera =

Species of legume

Flemingia strobilifera, commonly known as the luck plant or wild hops, is a perennial flowering plant in the legume family, Fabaceae, and subfamily Faboideae. It is native to South, East and Southeast Asia.

== Range ==
It is common in China, Taiwan, Bhutan, India, Nepal, Pakistan, Sri Lanka, Laos, Myanmar; Thailand, Vietnam, Indonesia, Malaysia, Papua New Guinea and Philippines.

== Description ==
The erect, perennial shrub grows 1.5 m to 2 m tall. The leaves are ovate to oblong with pinnate venation and wavy margins. It flowers from October to December. Each small, white pea-shaped flower is enclosed by a pair of reniform flower bracts. The alternating bracts are arranged in 2 files along the raceme, and eventually turn papery as they dry out. The small, cylindrical pods release their tiny black and red seeds by explosive dehiscence.

== Uses ==
In many parts of the Indian subcontinent it is used as a traditional medicine to treat epilepsy, hysteria and fever. It is an essential part of the Bihu (গৰু বিহু) festival, during which the cattle are washed and gently beaten with twigs of this plant. It is known as makhiyoti (মাখিয়তী) in the north-eastern Indian state of Assam.

== Ecology ==
The species is invasive in New Caledonia. In Panama it is an invasive plant species.

== Gallery ==
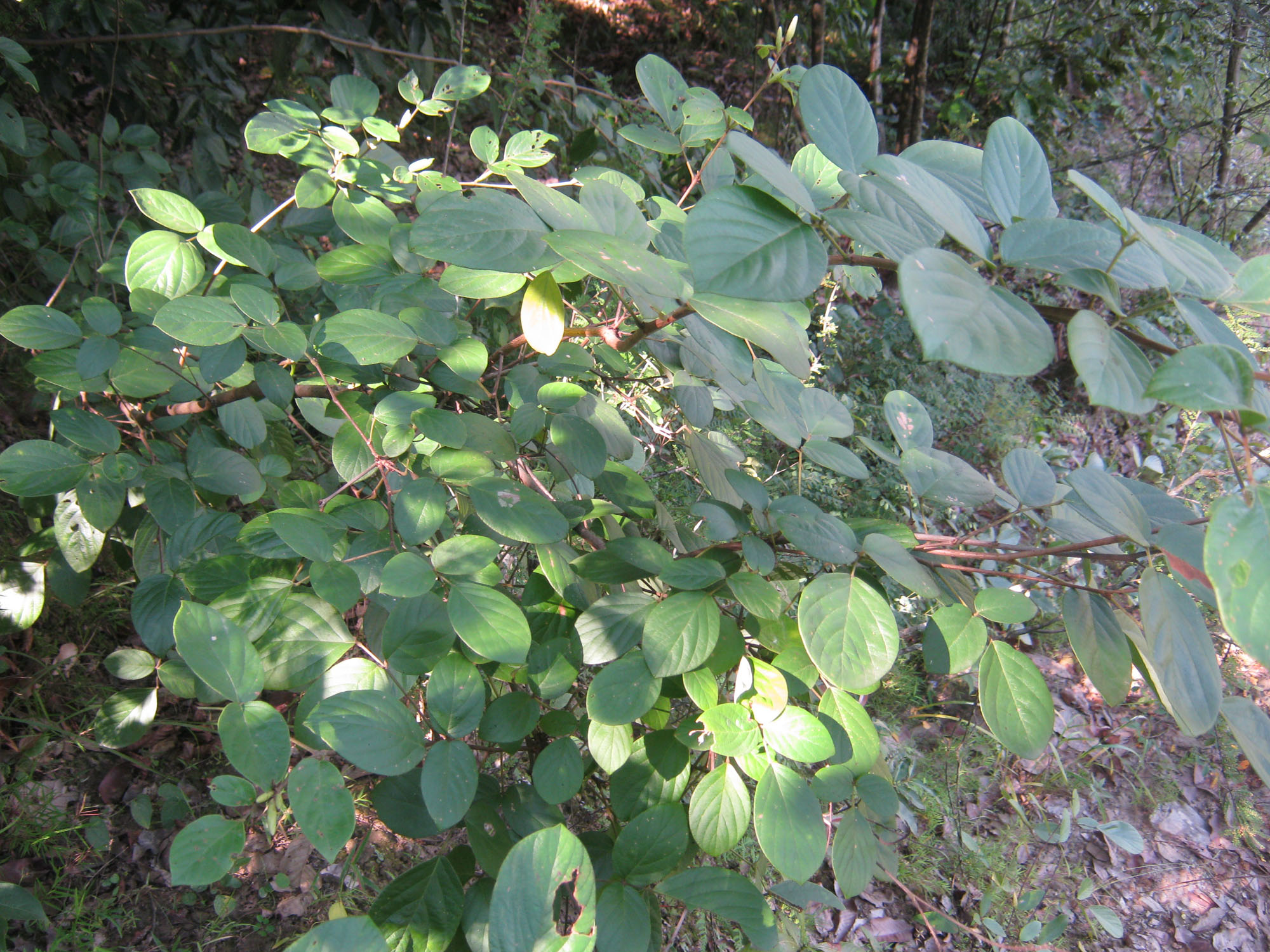
Habit in Panchkhal valley, Nepal

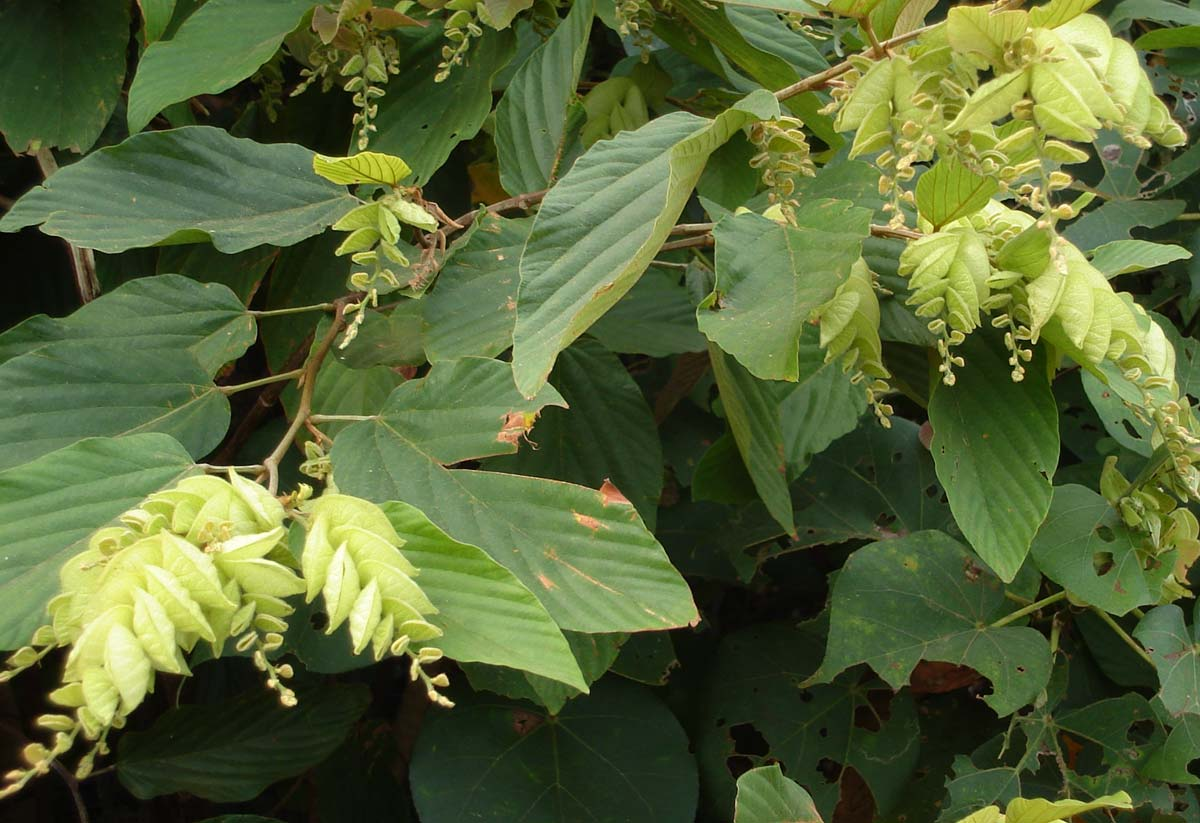
Green inflorescences

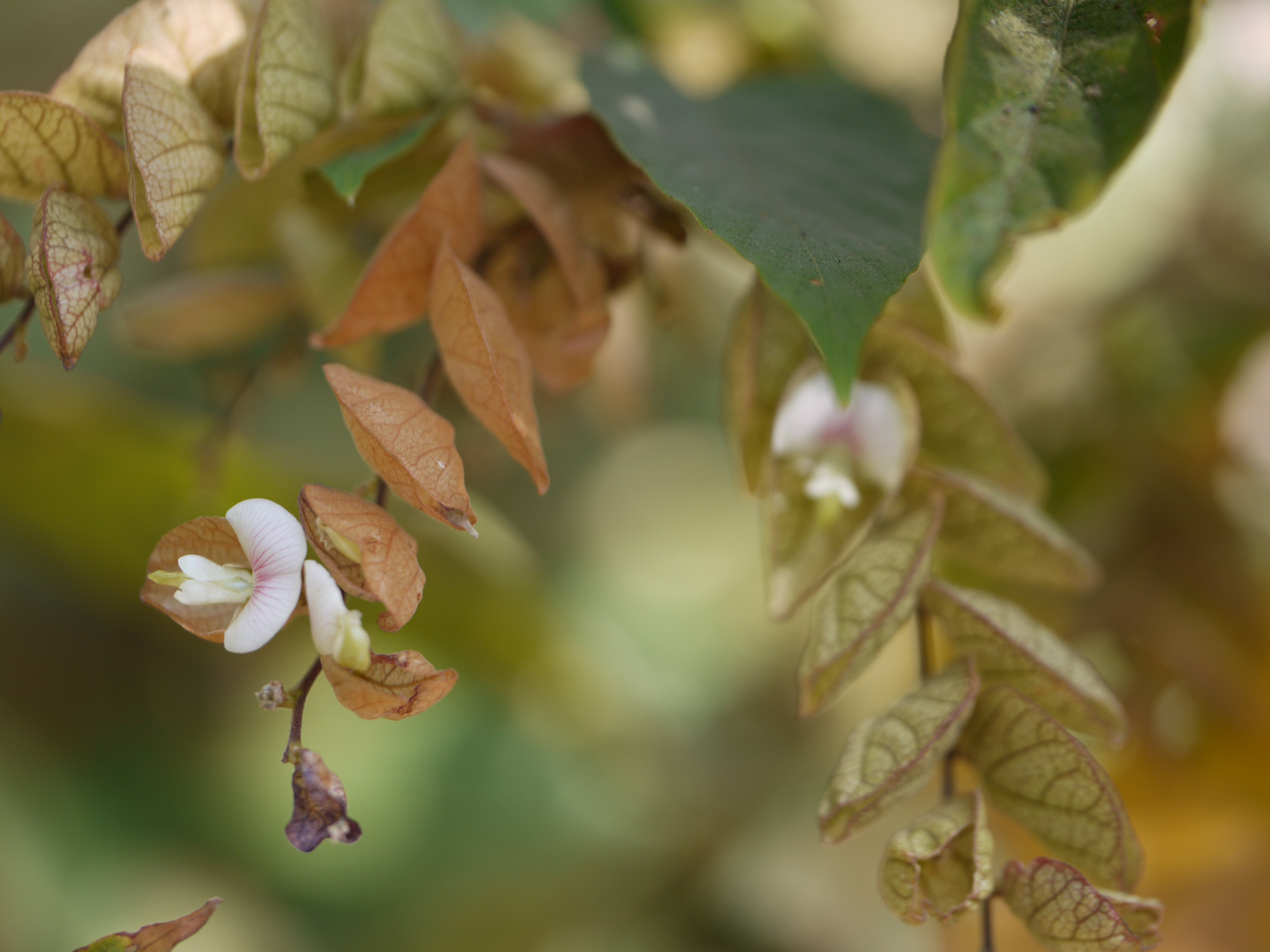
Papilionaceous flowers emerging from bracts

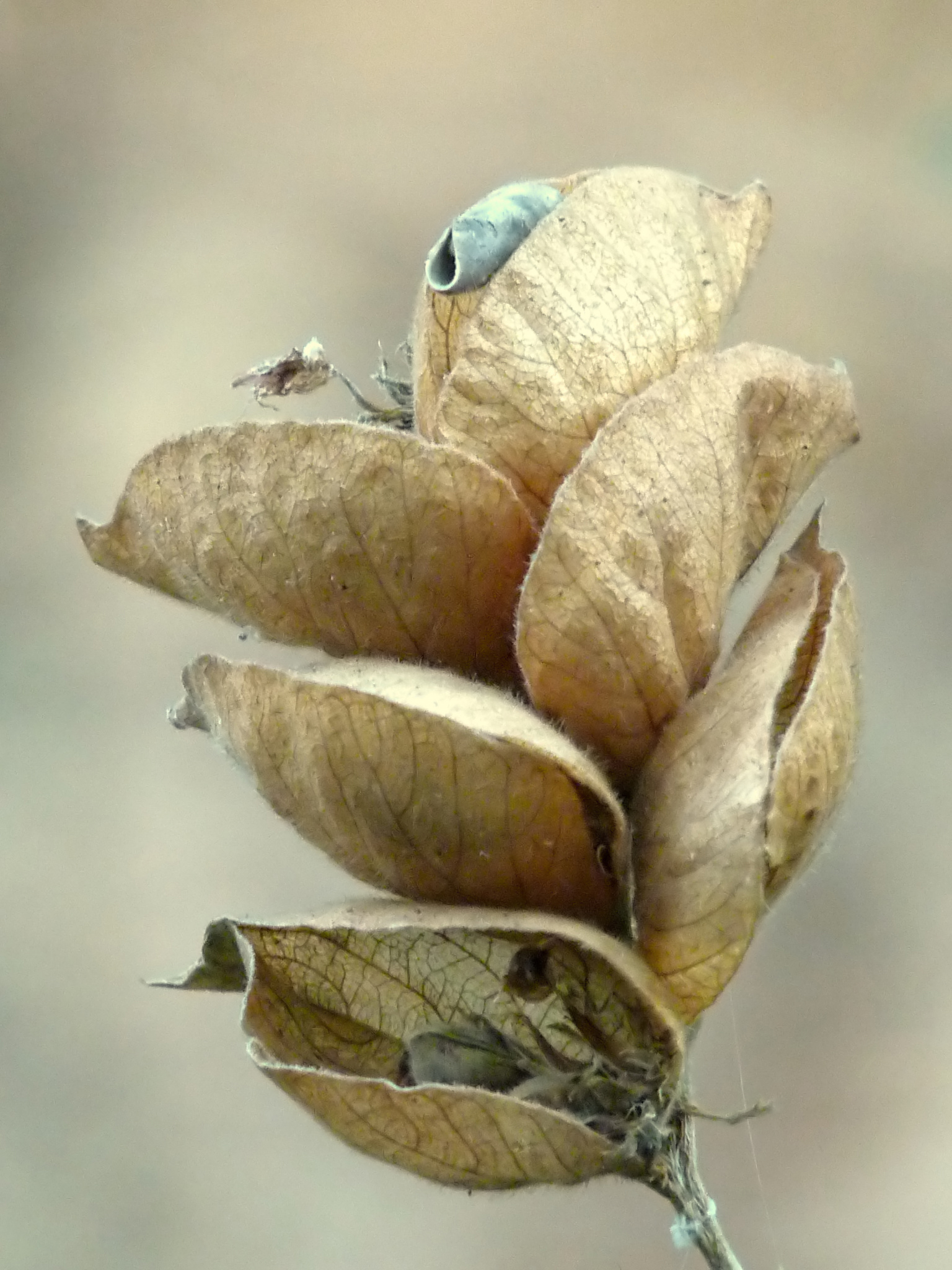
The persistent, papery bracts on inflorescence

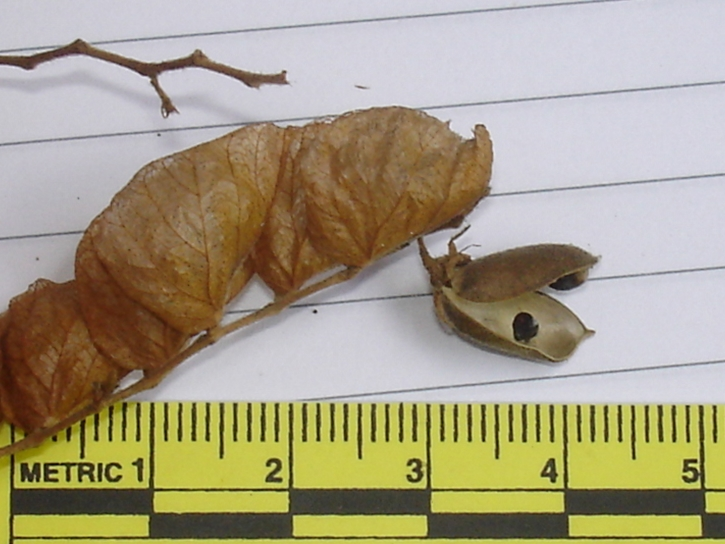
Dry bracts, dehiscent brown pod and seed
