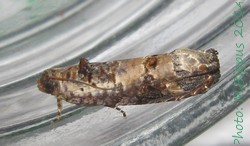
- Dudua aprobola

Scientific classification
- Kingdom: Animalia
- Phylum: Arthropoda
- Class: Insecta
- Order: Lepidoptera
- Family: Tortricidae
- Tribe: Olethreutini
- Genus: Dudua; Walker, 1864

= Dudua =

Genus of tortrix moths

Dudua is a genus of moths belonging to the subfamily Olethreutinae of the family Tortricidae.

== Species ==
- Dudua adocima Diakonoff, 1981
- Dudua anaprobola (Bradley, 1953)
- Dudua anisoptera Clarke, 1976
- Dudua aprobola (Meyrick, 1886)
- Dudua atriphraga (Diakonoff, 1968)
- Dudua brachytoma Diakonoff, 1973
- Dudua carpophora Diakonoff, 1973
- Dudua charadraea (Meyrick, 1909)
- Dudua chlorohygra Diakonoff, 1973
- Dudua crossotoma (Meyrick, 1931)
- Dudua cyclographa Diakonoff, 1973
- Dudua dissectiformis Yu & Li, 2006
- Dudua eumenica (Meyrick, 1928)
- Dudua hemigrapta (Meyrick, 1931)
- Dudua hemitypa Diakonoff, 1983
- Dudua hesperialis Walker, 1864
- Dudua iniqua (Meyrick, 1921)
- Dudua lamproterma Diakonoff, 1973
- Dudua metacyma Diakonoff, 1973
- Dudua microsema Diakonoff, 1973
- Dudua perornata Diakonoff, 1973
- Dudua perusta Diakonoff, 1983
- Dudua phyllanthana (Meyrick, 1881)
- Dudua piratodes (Meyrick, 1930)
- Dudua proba Diakonoff, 1973
- Dudua proxima Clarke, 1976
- Dudua setilegula Razowski & Wojtusiak, 2012
- Dudua scaeaspis (Meyrick in Caradja & Meyrick, 1937)
- Dudua siderea (Turner, 1916)
- Dudua tectigera (Meyrick, 1910)
- Dudua tetanota (Meyrick, 1909)
- Dudua ultima Diakonoff, 1973

== See also ==
- List of Tortricidae genera
