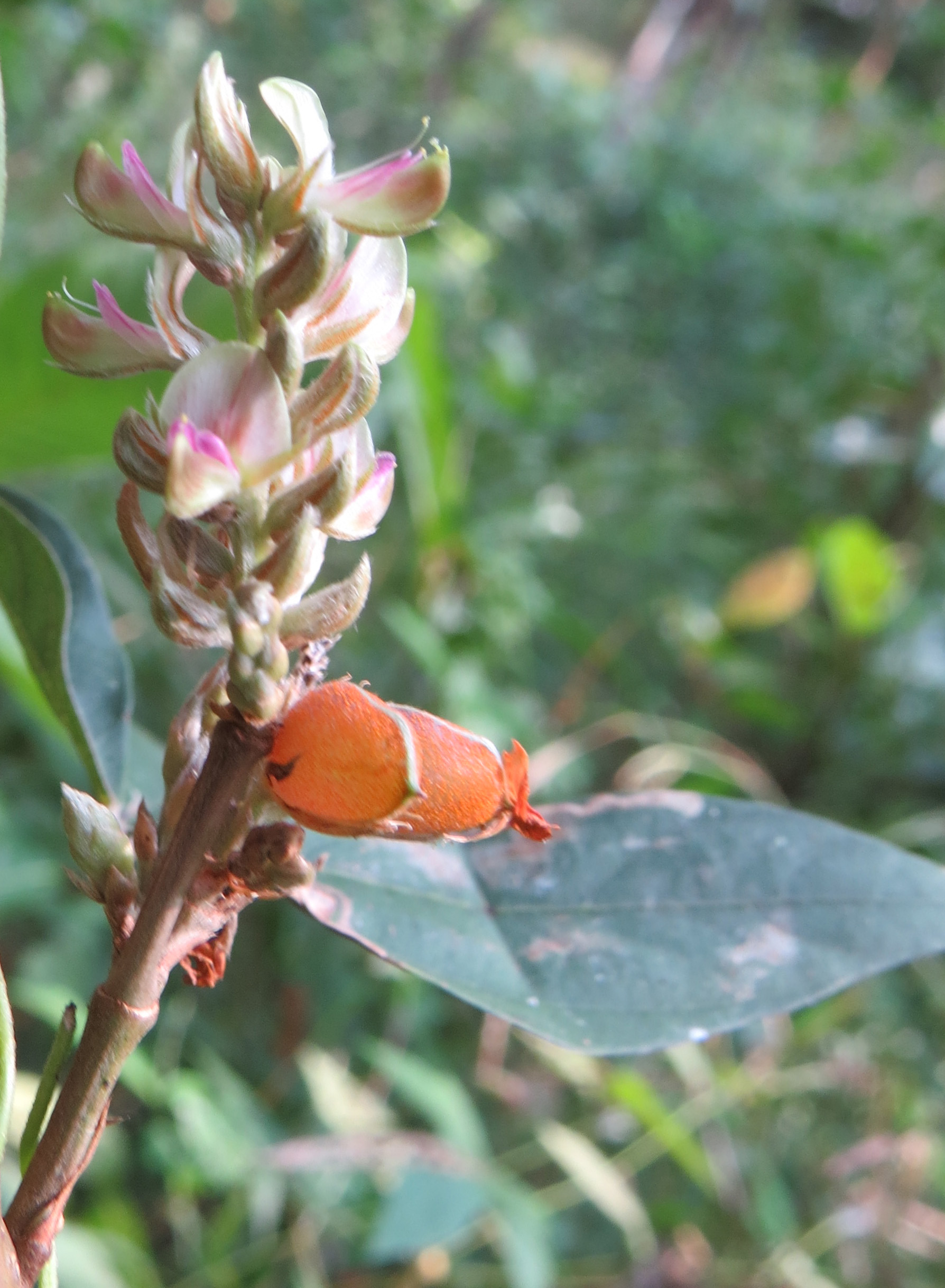

Scientific classification
- Kingdom: Plantae
- Clade: Tracheophytes
- Clade: Angiosperms
- Clade: Eudicots
- Clade: Rosids
- Order: Fabales
- Family: Fabaceae
- Subfamily: Faboideae
- Genus: Flemingia
- Species: F. macrophylla

Binomial name
- Flemingia macrophylla (Willd.) Merr., 1910

Synonyms
- Crotalaria macrophylla Willd. Flemingia angustifolia Roxb. Flemingia bhottea Buch.-Ham. Flemingia capitata Buch.-Ham. Flemingia congesta Roxb. ex W. T. Aiton; Flemingia latifolia Benth. Flemingia nana Roxb. Flemingia semialata W.T.Aiton; Moghania cumingiana (Benth.) Kuntze; Moghania macrophylla (Willd.) Kuntze; Moghania semialata (W.T.Aiton) Mukerjee

= Flemingia macrophylla =

Species of legume

Flemingia macrophylla is a tropical woody leguminous shrub in the family Fabaceae. It is a multipurpose plant widely used in agriculture, crop improvement, fodder, dyes and for various therapeutic purposes. Perhaps, it is the most versatile species of Flemingia in terms of adaptation, medicinal and agricultural applications.

== Description ==
Flemingia macrophylla is a woody, perennial, deep-rooting, and leafy shrub. It is about 0.6-2.4 m high (rarely 3 m). The main stem is prostrate or erect, with numerous stems arising from a single base. The young branches are greenish, ribbed, triangular in section and silky; while the old stems are brown, almost round in section. The leaves are trifoliate. leaflets are papery, with a glabrous upper surface. Inflorescences are densely spicate-racemose or paniculate, and bracts are foliaceous or dry, persistent or deciduous. Pods are small and turn brown when ripening; they are dehiscent, generally with two shiny black seeds in the vessel. Seeds are globular, 2–3 mm in diameter, and shiny black. The leaves are disproportionately large, hence origin of the specific name, macrophylla meaning ‘large leaved’ (Greek makros = large; phyllon = leaf).

== Distribution and habitat ==
It is a native plant of subhumid to humid (sub-) tropics where average annual rainfall is typically 1100–3500 mm with up to 6 dry months, at altitude up to 2000 m above msl. Thus its natural habitat is found in Asia including Bhutan, southern China, Cambodia, India, Indonesia, Laos, Myanmar, Malaysia, Nepal, northern Pakistan, Papua New Guinea, Philippines, Sri Lanka, Taiwan, Thailand and Vietnam. It has been cultivated and naturalised in sub-Saharan Africa (such as Côte d'Ivoire, Ghana, Nigeria, Cameroon), Central and South America (e.g. Costa Rica, Panama, Colombia), and tropical Australia.

Its natural habitat is often in shaded locations, scrub, woodlands, grasslands, gallery forest edges and alike, and on soils with fertility ranging from very low to intermediate (and even high) acidic contents. The shrubs are mostly seen under trees along watercourses and in grasslands, on clay and lateritic soils. The plant is tolerant of light shade and is moderately able to survive fires. It can tolerate fairly long dry spells and is capable of surviving on very poorly drained soils with waterlogging. It can strive well on a wide variety of soils within a pH range from 4–8, and high soluble aluminium (80% saturation). It requires a minimum rainfall of about 1,100 mm, and up to 3,500 mm/year for normal propagation, and is very drought tolerant. It can flower and fruit throughout the year.

== Chemical constituents ==
A number of bioactive compounds have been reported from F. macrophylla. Like other members of Fabaceae, it is rich in Flavonoids. Genistein, 5, 7,3’, 4’-tetrahydroxyisoflavone, 5, 7, 4’-trihydroxyisoflavone-7-O-β-D-glucopyranoside, 5, 7,4’-trihydroxy-8,3’-diprenylflavanone, 5, 7,4’-trihydroxy-6-prenylisoflavone, flemichin D, lespedezaflavanone A and ouratea-catechin are isolated from the root, in which genistein and its isoflavones analogs are the main constituents. A novel flavanone, named fleminone, was isolated from a petrol extract of the stems. A new isoflavone, called flemiphyllin was also isolated. Three new flavonoids, fleminginin (1), flemingichromone (2), and flemingichalcone (3), and other twenty known compounds were isolated from the aerial parts.

== Uses ==
=== Agronomy ===
Flemingia macrophylla is used in a variety of agricultural practices and by-products. Due to slow decomposition rate of its leaves, along with its dense growth, moderate drought tolerance, ability to withstand occasional flooding, and coppicing ability, it is commonly used for mulching, weed control and sod protection. It is most commonly used in contour hedgerows for erosion control, often in association with Desmodium cinereum. Prunings are used for mulch and green manure in alley cropping systems. Probably the most interesting feature of the species is the relative resistance of its leaves to decomposition. It is experimentally demonstrated that F. macrophylla is superior over the common Leucaena leucocephala as mulch for plantain production.

It is also often used to shade young coffee and cocoa plants, for weed suppression and soil enrichment in orchards, and to provide fuel wood and stakes for climbing crop species. However, it is considered a poor forage since its leaves have a high fibre and condensed tannin concentrations and is not readily eaten by stock. Yet it is used as dietary supplement by mixing with grasses and other legumes, particularly during dry season when regular forages are scarce.

In India it is used as a host plant to the Lac insect, and is sometimes intercropped with food crops during its establishment period. It is also one of the major sources of the resinous powder, called in Arabic ورس (wars), with variants waras, wurs and wurus, obtained from fruits of the plant. It is a coarse purple or orange-brown powder, consisting of the glandular hairs rubbed from the dry pods, principally used for dyeing silk to brilliant orange color; the active compound for it is flemingin. In Arabia, the powder is used as cosmetic.

=== Folk medicine ===
Extracts from Flemingia species have been used as a traditional medicine for treating rheumatism.
