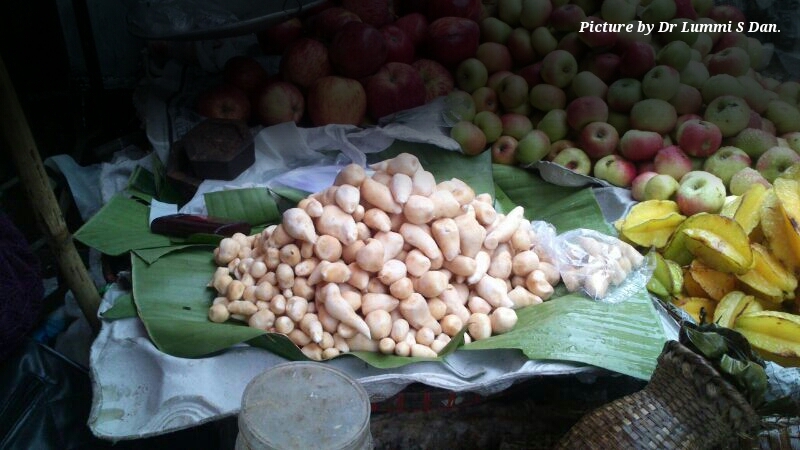
- Sohphlang, ready to eat

Scientific classification
- Kingdom: Plantae
- Clade: Tracheophytes
- Clade: Angiosperms
- Clade: Eudicots
- Clade: Rosids
- Order: Fabales
- Family: Fabaceae
- Subfamily: Faboideae
- Genus: Flemingia
- Species: F. vestita

Binomial name
- Flemingia vestita Benth. ex Baker, 1876

Synonyms
- Flemingia procumbens Roxb. Moghania procumbens (Roxb.) Mukerjee Moghania vestita (Benth.) ex Baker Kuntze

= Flemingia vestita =

Species of legume

Flemingia vestita, famously known as sohphlang, is a nitrogen fixing herb with characteristic tuberous root, belonging to the genus Flemingia. The root is edible and is a common vegetable in some Asian tribal communities. In addition, it has been traditionally used as an anthelmintic, the basis of which is scientifically validated.

It is found as a wild herb along the mountain slopes of Himalayas. It is distributed in Sichuan and Yunnan provinces of China, Nepal and Khasi hills, Jaintia Hills of Meghalaya in Northeast India. It is also sparsely found in Laos, Philippines and Vietnam.

== Description ==
Flemingia vestita is a perennial herb, having a prostrate but weak stem, measuring about ~60 cm in average. It is highly branched with hairy rhizome and hirsute stems. The roots are tuberous (6 cm or longer). Leaves are pinnately compound with obovate-cuneate leaflets. Leaves are digitately 3-foliolate; and also pubescent like the stem. Lateral leaflets are obliquely elliptic, and slightly smaller. Raceme is axillary or terminal, about 2–10 cm, and densely pubescent; bracts lanceolate. Calyx is 5-lobed; lobes are linear-lanceolate, lower one is longest, longer than the tube. Corolla is slightly longer than calyx and elliptical. Fruits are hairy sub-cylindrical pods. Seed is globose, brown or black in colour. Flowers are bright-red. It flowers during August and September.

== Chemical constituents ==
It is rich in bioactive isoflavones such as genistein, daidzein, formononetin and pseudobaptigenin.

== Uses ==
=== Vegetable ===
This juicy tuber is a highly priced food among the Garo, Khasi and Jaintia tribes of Meghalaya, India. In fact its demand as foodstuff has increased so much that it has been cultivated as a cash crop and is regularly available in the local markets. The delicate skin is easily peeled off to expose a smooth cream-coloured flesh that has a sweet, nut-like flavour. In terms of nutritional value, it is particularly rich in phosphorus and proteins.

=== Medicinal ===
The tuber has been an indigenous vermifuge among the Khasis, to whom it is called soh-phlang. The raw tuber or the root peel is directly consumed for the treatment of soft-bodied intestinal worms. Experimental investigation started in 1996 when the in vitro activity of tuber peel extract was tested against different helminth parasites, including the nematodes such as Ascaris suum, Ascaris lumbricoides, Ascaridia galli, Heterakis gallinarum, a cestode Raillietina echinobothrida and trematodes such as Paramphistomum sp., Artyfechinostomum sufrartyfex and Fasciolopsis buski. In 1991 an isoflavone, genistein was isolated from the tuber extract which was demonstrated to be the major anthelmintic principle, highly potent against trematodes and cestodes. It was further demonstrated effective against the sheep liver fluke Fasciola hepatica and human tapeworms such as Echinococcus multilocularis and E. granulosus metacestodes.

=== Agriculture ===
Its property of nitrogen fixation has been put to experimental use. Mixed cropping with F. vestita was found to give better economic returns, mainly due to improved soil fertility with a net gain in nitrogen of up to 250 kg/ha/year.
