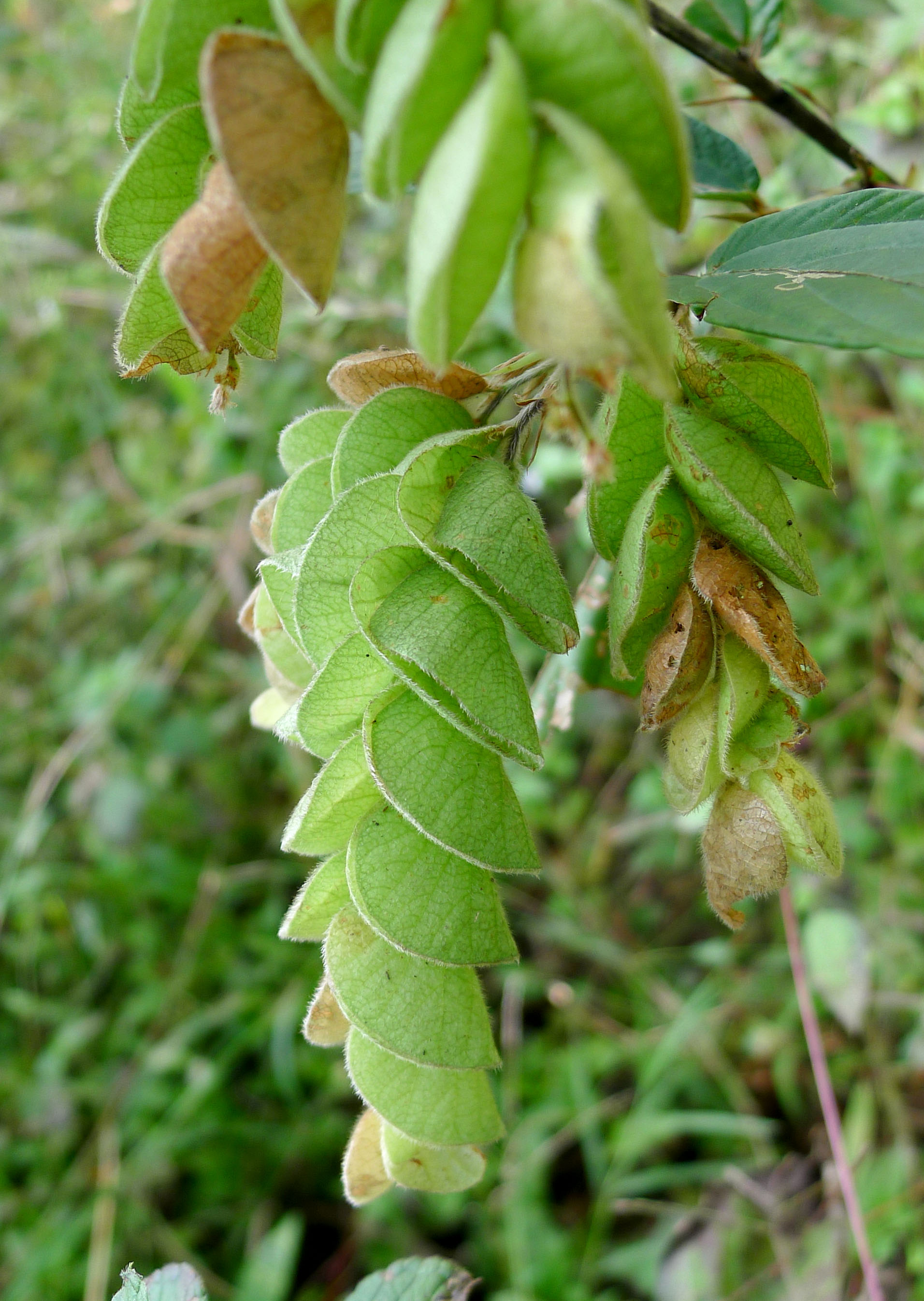
- Flemingia strobilifera

Scientific classification
- Kingdom: Plantae
- Clade: Tracheophytes
- Clade: Angiosperms
- Clade: Eudicots
- Clade: Rosids
- Order: Fabales
- Family: Fabaceae
- Subfamily: Faboideae
- Tribe: Phaseoleae
- Subtribe: Cajaninae
- Genus: Flemingia; Roxb. ex W. T. Aiton (1812), nom. cons.

Species
- See text

Synonyms
- Lepidocoma Jungh. (1845); Luorea Neck. ex J.St.-Hil. (1812), nom. rej.; Maughania J.St.-Hil. (1812), nom. illeg.; Moghamia J.St.-Hil. (1841), orth. var.; Ostryodium Desv. (1814)

= Flemingia =

Genus of legumes

Flemingia is a genus of plants in the family Fabaceae. It is native sub-Saharan Africa, Yemen, tropical Asia, and Australasia. In Asia the species are distributed in Bhutan, Burma, China, India; Indonesia, Laos, Malaysia, Nepal, Pakistan, Papua New Guinea, Philippines, Sri Lanka, Taiwan, Thailand and Vietnam. The genus was erected in 1812.

== Description ==
Members of Flemingia are shrubs, or herbs (or subshrubs); evergreen, or deciduous and perennial. They are generally about 0.2–1.5 m high. The stem is prostrate but weak. Leaves are small to medium-sized; not fasciculate, but alternate. The stem and leaves are pubescent, with dense hairs. Leaf blades are flat dorsoventrally. Flowers are aggregated in ‘inflorescences’; not crowded at the stem bases; in racemes, or in heads, or in panicles. Fruits are aerial, about 6–15 mm long; non-fleshy and hairy.

== Diversity ==
The number of known species is ambiguous due to taxonomic problems; and is usually enumerated as more than 30. Burma and China have the highest record of Flemingia species with 16 each, followed by India (with 15 species), Thailand (11 species), Laos (10 species), Vietnam (8 species), Bhutan (1 species) and Nepal (5 species). Plants of the World Online accepts 46 species.

== Uses ==
Root tubers of Flamingia species have traditionally been used as food for Aborigines of the Northern Territory.

=== Traditional use ===
Some species of Flemingia are used in the herbal medicine traditions of various Asian communities. This is attributed to their unique chemical properties, especially those of flavonoids and sterols. Their most common applications in traditional medicine are for epilepsy, dysentery, stomach ache, insomnia, cataract, helminthiasis, rheumatism, ulcer, and tuberculosis.

== Species ==
46 species are accepted.

- Flemingia angusta Craib
- Flemingia angustifolia Roxb.
- Flemingia bhutanica Grierson
- Flemingia bracteata (Roxb.) Wight
- Flemingia chappar Buch.-Ham. ex Benth.
- Flemingia cumingiana Benth.
- Flemingia faginea (Guill. & Perr.) Baker
- Flemingia fluminalis C.B.Clarke ex Prain
- Flemingia fruticulosa Wall. ex Benth.
- Flemingia gracilis (Mukerjee) Ali
- Flemingia grahamiana Wight & Arn.
- Flemingia horsfieldii Blume ex Miq.
- Flemingia javanica C.Y.Wu
- Flemingia kerrii Craib
- Flemingia kweichowensis Tang & F.T.Wang ex Y.T.Wei & S.K.Lee
- Flemingia lacei Craib
- Flemingia langbiangensis T.V.Do, B.Xu & X.F.Gao
- Flemingia latifolia Benth.
- Flemingia lineata (L.) Roxb. ex W.T.Aiton
- Flemingia macrophylla (Willd.) Kuntze ex Merr.
- Flemingia mengpengensis Y.T.Wei & S.K.Lee
- Flemingia mukerjeeana S.K.Gavade, Survesw., Maesen & Lekhak
- Flemingia nana Roxb. ex W.T.Aiton
- Flemingia nilgheriensis (Benth. ex Baker f.) Wight ex T.Cooke
- Flemingia paniculata Wall. ex Benth.
- Flemingia parviflora Benth.
- Flemingia pauciflora Benth.
- Flemingia praecox C.B.Clarke ex Prain
- Flemingia procumbens Roxb.
- Flemingia prostrata Roxb.Junior ex Roxb.
- Flemingia rollae (Billore & Hemadri) Anand Kumar
- Flemingia semialata Roxb. ex W.T.Aiton
- Flemingia sirindhorniae Mattapha, Chantar. & Suddee
- Flemingia sootepensis Craib
- Flemingia stricta Roxb.
- Flemingia strobilifera (L.) W.T.Aiton
- Flemingia teysmanniana Miq.
- Flemingia tiliacea Niyomdham
- Flemingia trifoliastrum Domin
- Flemingia trifoliata (Jungh.) C.Y.Wu
- Flemingia tuberosa Dalzell
- Flemingia vestita Benth. ex Baker f.
- Flemingia wallichii Wight & Arn.
- Flemingia weii T.V.Do & X.F.Gao
- Flemingia wightiana Graham ex Wight & Arn.
- Flemingia yunnanensis Franch.
