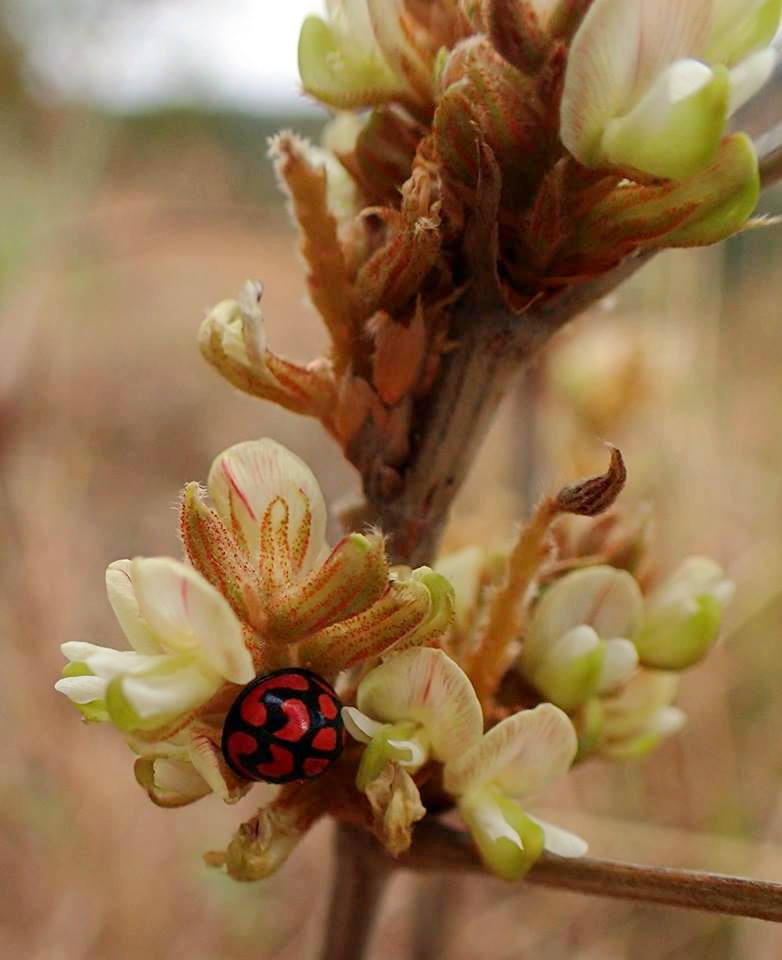

Scientific classification
- Kingdom: Plantae
- Clade: Tracheophytes
- Clade: Angiosperms
- Clade: Eudicots
- Clade: Rosids
- Order: Fabales
- Family: Fabaceae
- Subfamily: Faboideae
- Genus: Flemingia
- Species: F. grahamiana

Binomial name
- Flemingia grahamiana Wight & Arn.

= Flemingia grahamiana =

Species of plant

Flemingia grahamiana is a species of flowering plant in the family Fabaceae. Extracts of the plant are used in the dyeing of silk and cotton in parts of India, Africa, and the Middle East.

== Description ==
An erect herb or subshrub, Flemingia grahamiana can grow up to 1.8 m tall but commonly shorter, it is much branched, deeply rooted and sometimes tuberous. Leaves appear digitately trifoliate with stipules and petioles present; leaflets are elliptic to lanceolate in outline, up to 13 cm long and 7 cm wide. Inflorescence is an axillary raceme, corolla is yellowish white to pink in color, calyx is tubular and up to 1.5 cm long. Fruit is an inflated oblong pod, 2 seeded and covered with a red or orange viscous exude.

== Distribution and habitat ==
Occurs in India, parts of South Asia, in particular, Laos, Myanmar, Vietnam, Yemen and also occurs in East Africa southwards to South Africa. Found on hill slopes, termite mounds and in open and wooded savannah in Africa.

== Chemistry ==
Chalcone and flemingin A have been isolated from the leaves of the species, also isolated from the roots were isoflavones and prenylated flavanones.

== Uses ==
Flemingia grahamiana is used in various countries for ethnomedical purposes, in parts of India leaves are used as a purgative, while in parts of Malawi and Zimbabwe root extracts are used as a decoction to treat diarrhea and dysentery . Exudates from the pod is used in the dyeing of silk and sometimes cotton.
