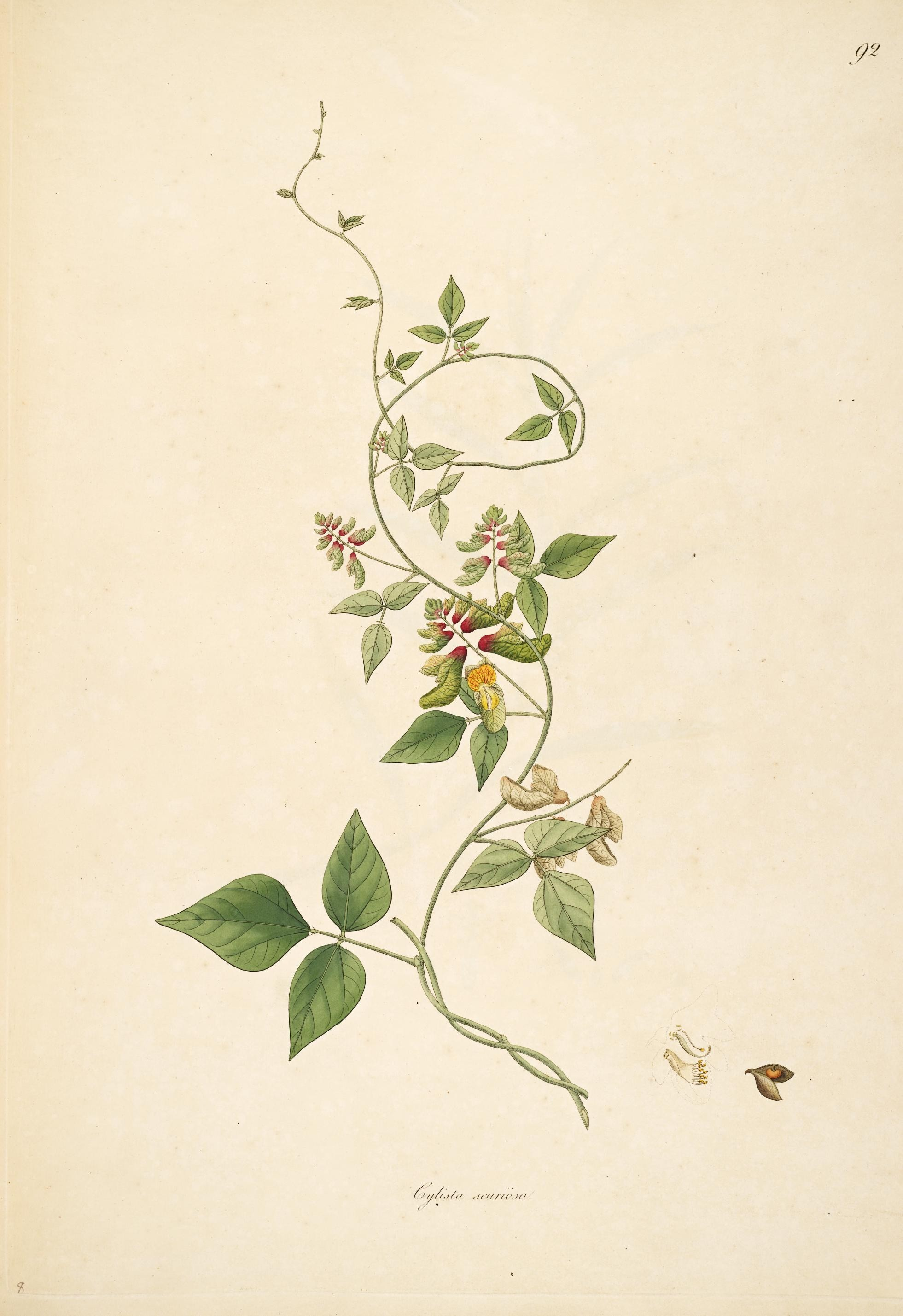
- Paracalyx scariosus

Scientific classification
- Kingdom: Plantae
- Clade: Tracheophytes
- Clade: Angiosperms
- Clade: Eudicots
- Clade: Rosids
- Order: Fabales
- Family: Fabaceae
- Subfamily: Faboideae
- Tribe: Phaseoleae
- Subtribe: Cajaninae
- Genus: Paracalyx; Ali

Species
- 5; see text

= Paracalyx =

Genus of legumes

Paracalyx is a genus of flowering plants in the legume family, Fabaceae. It includes five species of herbs native to northeastern Africa (Ethiopia and Somalia) and Socotra, and the Indian subcontinent and Indochina. Typical habitats are seasonally-dry tropical forest, woodland, thicket, bushland and scrub, often along watercourses and in rocky areas.

== Species ==
As of September 2023, Plants of the World Online accepted the following species:

- Paracalyx balfourii (Vierh.) Ali
- Paracalyx microphyllus (Chiov.) Ali
- Paracalyx nogalensis (Chiov.) Ali
- Paracalyx scariosus (Roxb.) Ali
- Paracalyx somalorum (Vierh.) Ali
