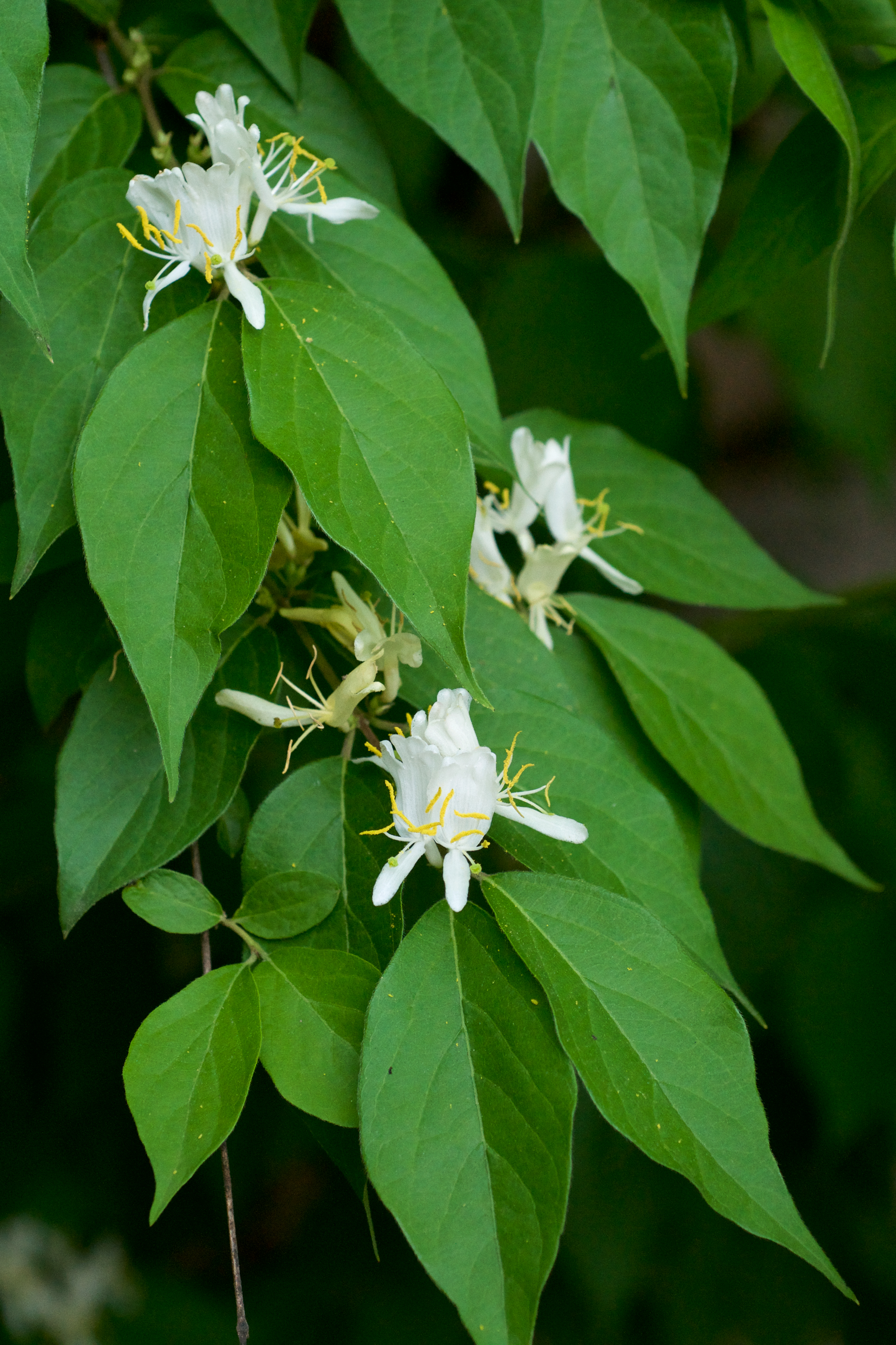

Scientific classification
- Kingdom: Plantae
- Clade: Tracheophytes
- Clade: Angiosperms
- Clade: Eudicots
- Clade: Asterids
- Order: Dipsacales
- Family: Caprifoliaceae
- Genus: Lonicera
- Species: L. maackii

Binomial name
- Lonicera maackii (Rupr.) Maxim.

Synonyms
- Xylosteon maackii Rupr.

= Lonicera maackii =

Species of plant in the family Caprifoliaceae native to eastern Asia

Lonicera maackii, the Amur honeysuckle, is a species of honeysuckle in the family Caprifoliaceae that is native to temperate eastern Asia; specifically in northern and western China south to Yunnan, Mongolia, Primorsky Krai in southeastern Siberia, Korea, and, albeit rare there, central and northern Honshū, Japan.

Lonicera maackii is a listed endangered species in Japan. It has escaped from cultivation and naturalized in New Zealand and the eastern United States; in the woodlands of the U.S. it is a significant invasive species.

== Description ==
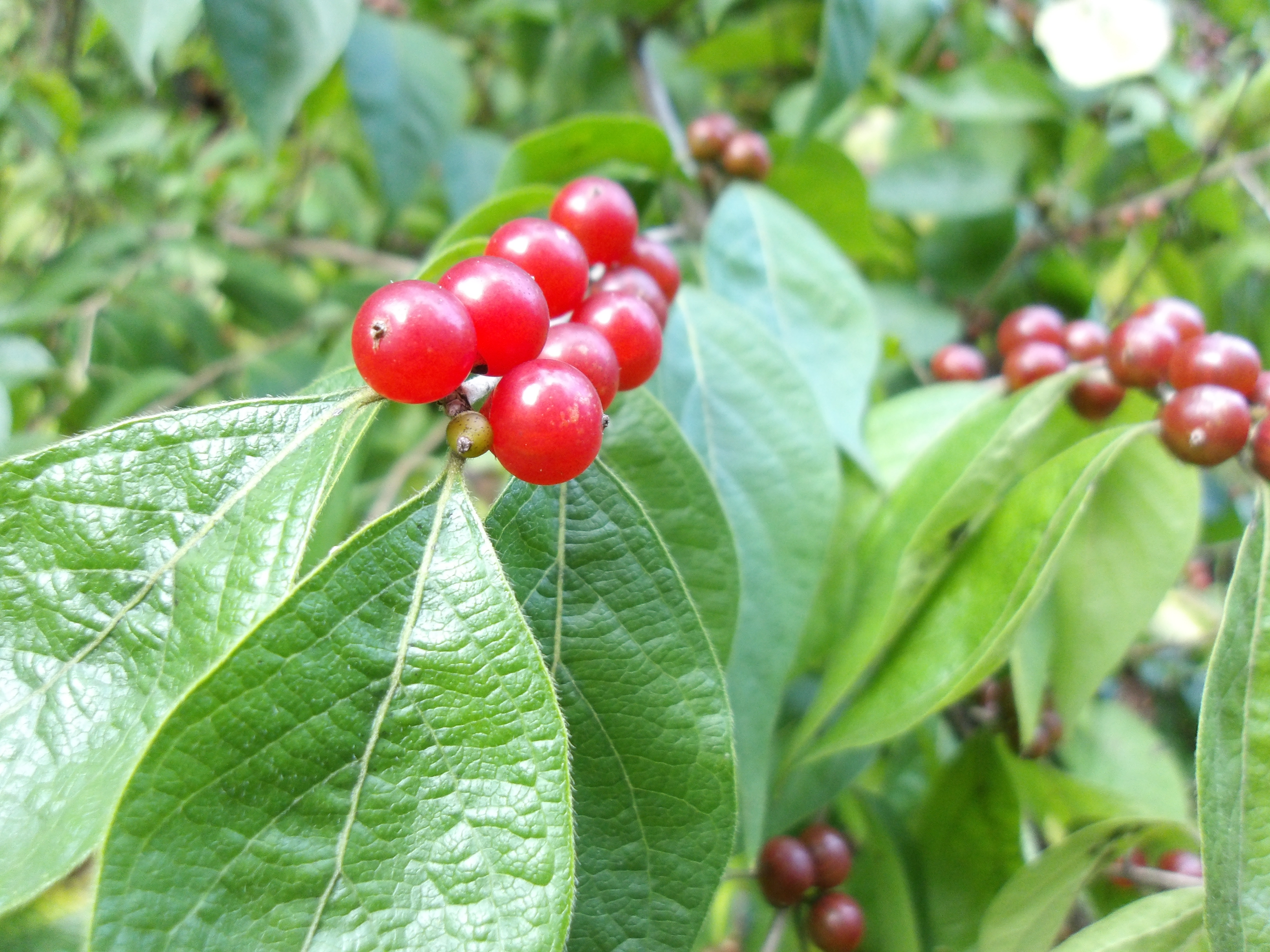
close up on the plant

The plant is a large, deciduous shrub that grows a maximum of 6 metres (20 ft) tall with stems of a maximum of 10 centimetres (4 in) in diameter. The leaves are oppositely arranged, 5–9 centimetres (2–3 1/2 in) long and 2–4 centimetres (3/4–1 5/8 in) broad, with an entire margin, and with at least some rough pubescence.

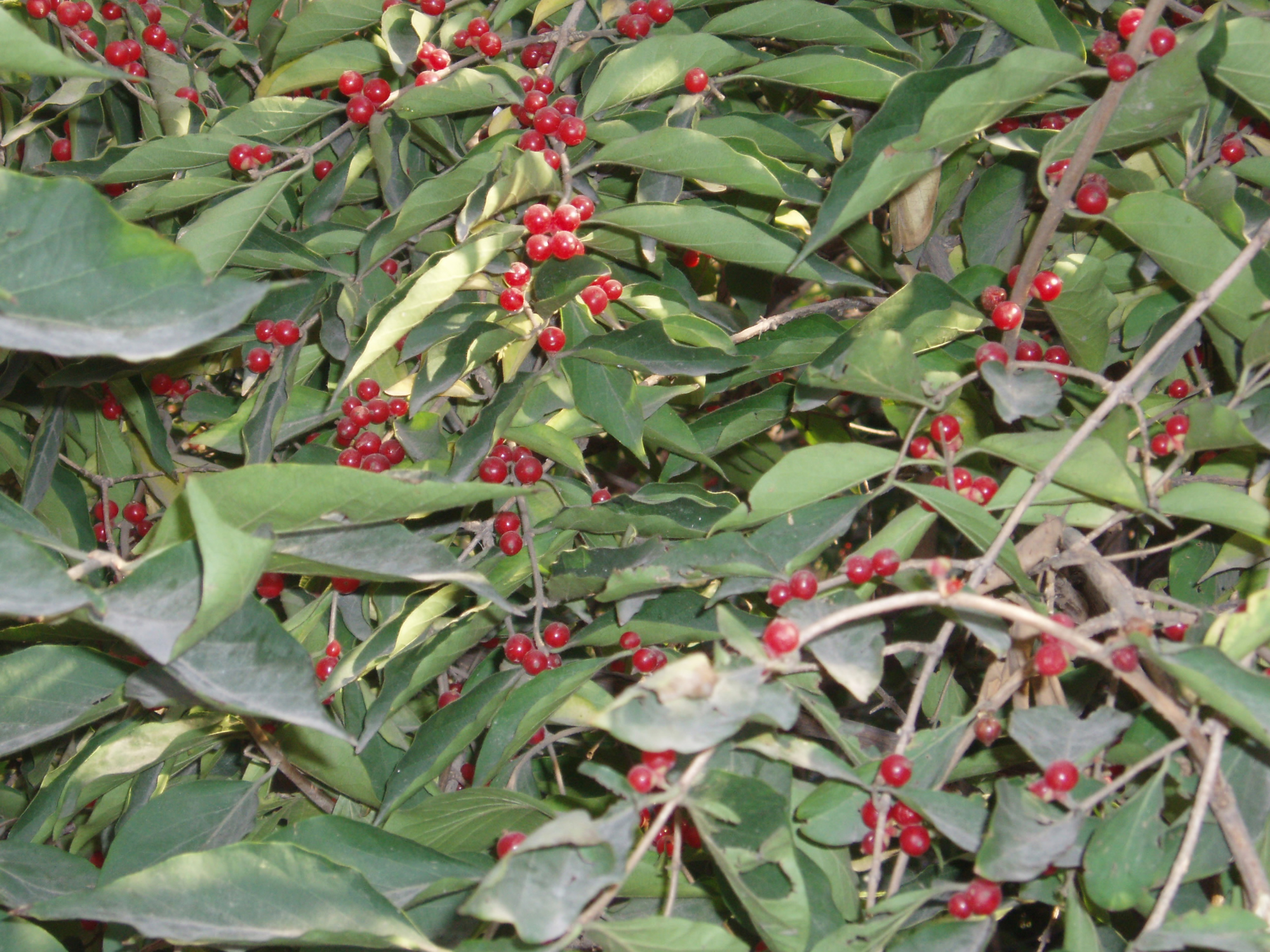
Foliage and fruit

The flowers are produced in pairs; they are 2 centimetres (3/4 in) long, have two lips, begin white and later turn yellow or pale orange in color; they bloom from middle of spring to early summer. The fruit is a bright red to black, semi-translucent berry, 2–6 millimetres (5/64–15/64 in) in diameter, that contains numerous small seeds.

=== Etymology and authority ===
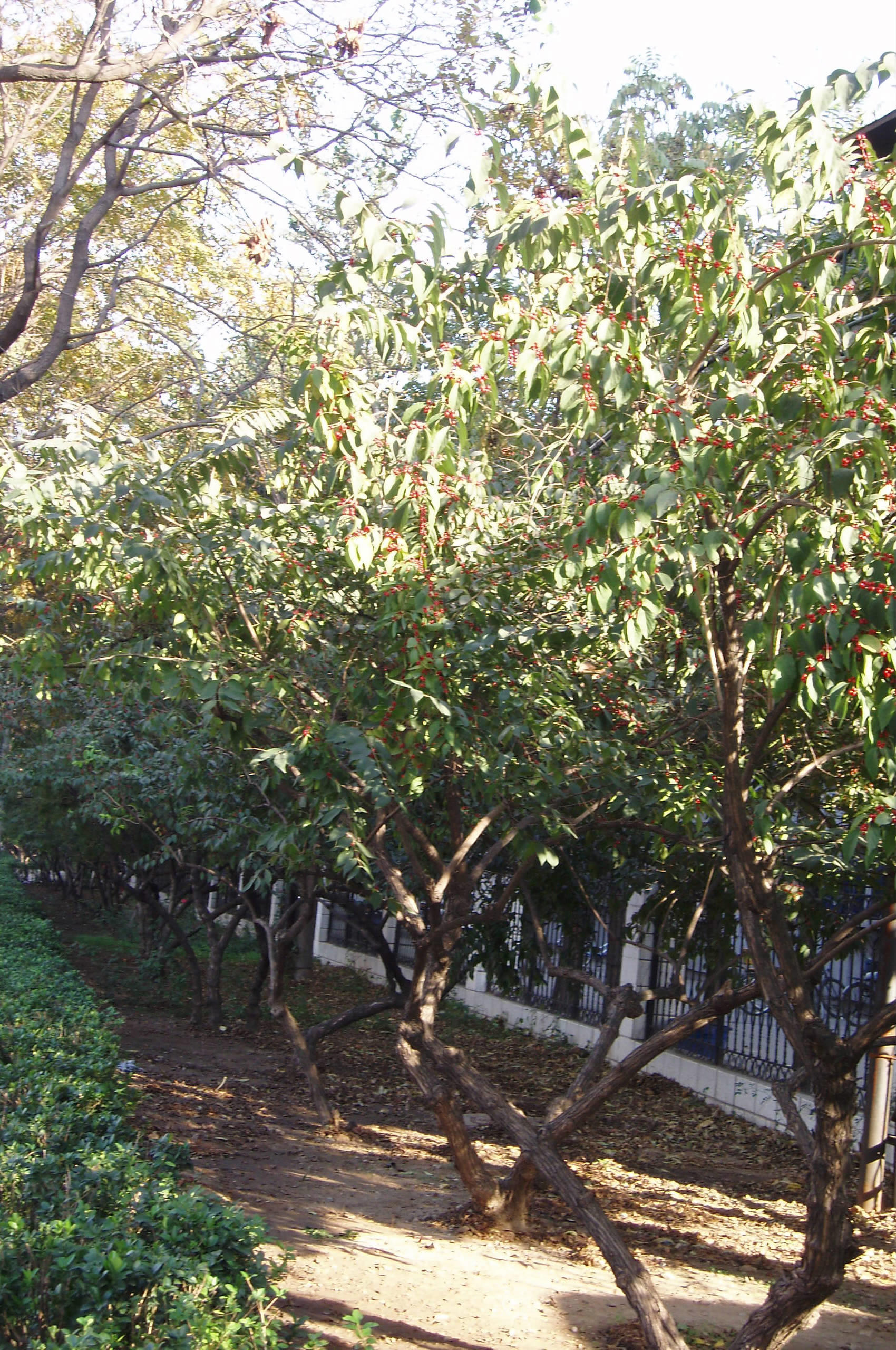
Lonicera maackii planted as a hedge

The species name "maackii" is derived from Richard Maack, a Russian naturalist of the 19th century. Its common name "Amur honeysuckle" is from its native range surrounding the Amur River, which demarcates the border between Siberia and Manchuria.

Some Internet sources name the species authority as "(Rupr.) Herder", but the correct authority is "(Rupr.) Maxim".

=== Cultivation ===
Amur honeysuckle is cultivated as an ornamental plant for its attractive flowers and as a hedge. Many cultivars have been selected for horticulture, including "Erubescens" with pink flowers and "Rem Red" with an erect form. The plant is adaptable and flourishes in a wide range of conditions. In the United States, it was planted to control erosion and to form hedges. It readily self-propagates via birds dispersing its seeds, and quickly spreads into habitats for which it has no community connectivity.

It grows rapidly and prefers shady habitats such as woodland understories, neglected urban areas, and fence rows. It can form very dense thickets.

The flowers are sometimes savored by children, who remove blossoms and pull off their bottoms so as to suck out the sweet nectar in the centers. The berries, on the other hand, are mildly poisonous to humans and therefore should not be consumed.

=== Alternatives ===
Because of the invasive nature of this species, regardless of whether it is banned locally, it is imprudent to cultivate Amur honeysuckle in climates similar to those where the species has invaded, e.g. eastern North America.

Possible alternative shrubs that are also fast growing, shade tolerant, and deciduous, but not invasive in eastern US include:

Calycanthus floridus
Cornus sericea
Hydrangea species

Viburnum cassinoides
Viburnum dentatum

Viburnum prunifolium
Viburnum trilobum

More native shrubs for use the Midwestern United States are listed in the pamphlet Curse of the Bush Honeysuckles!.

== Phytochemistry ==
L. maackii produces various secondary metabolites to deter insect herbivory. Cipollini et al. found seasonal variation in the levels of chlorogenic acid, apigenin, apigenin-7-glucoside, luteolin and luteolin-7-glucoside, and confirm their deterrent effect.

== Invasive nature and remedies ==
Birds and mammals consume and disperse seeds. Biotic transmission vectors include species: American robin (Turdus migratorius), hermit thrush (Catharus guttatus) and European starling (Sturnus vulgaris) and white-tailed deer (Odocoileus virginianus). Because of its well-documented invasiveness, propagation of this plant is illegal or controlled in some of the United States, where it is an alien species. The species is classified "invasive, banned" in Connecticut, "prohibited" in Massachusetts, as an invasive species in Tennessee, as an invasive species in Ohio, as a "Class B noxious weed" in Vermont, and as an invasive species in Wisconsin.

It has been suggested that plants growing outside their native range, in eastern Asia, should be removed and replaced by non-invasive alternatives. A 2016 review paper details the variety of competitive advantages this subcanopy woody species has over native plants in eastern North America and confirms that even the most successful combinations of stem cutting followed by herbicide application are not capable of killing all the individuals. The conclusion is that once this species has established, management interventions will need to continue into the future.

=== Consequences ===
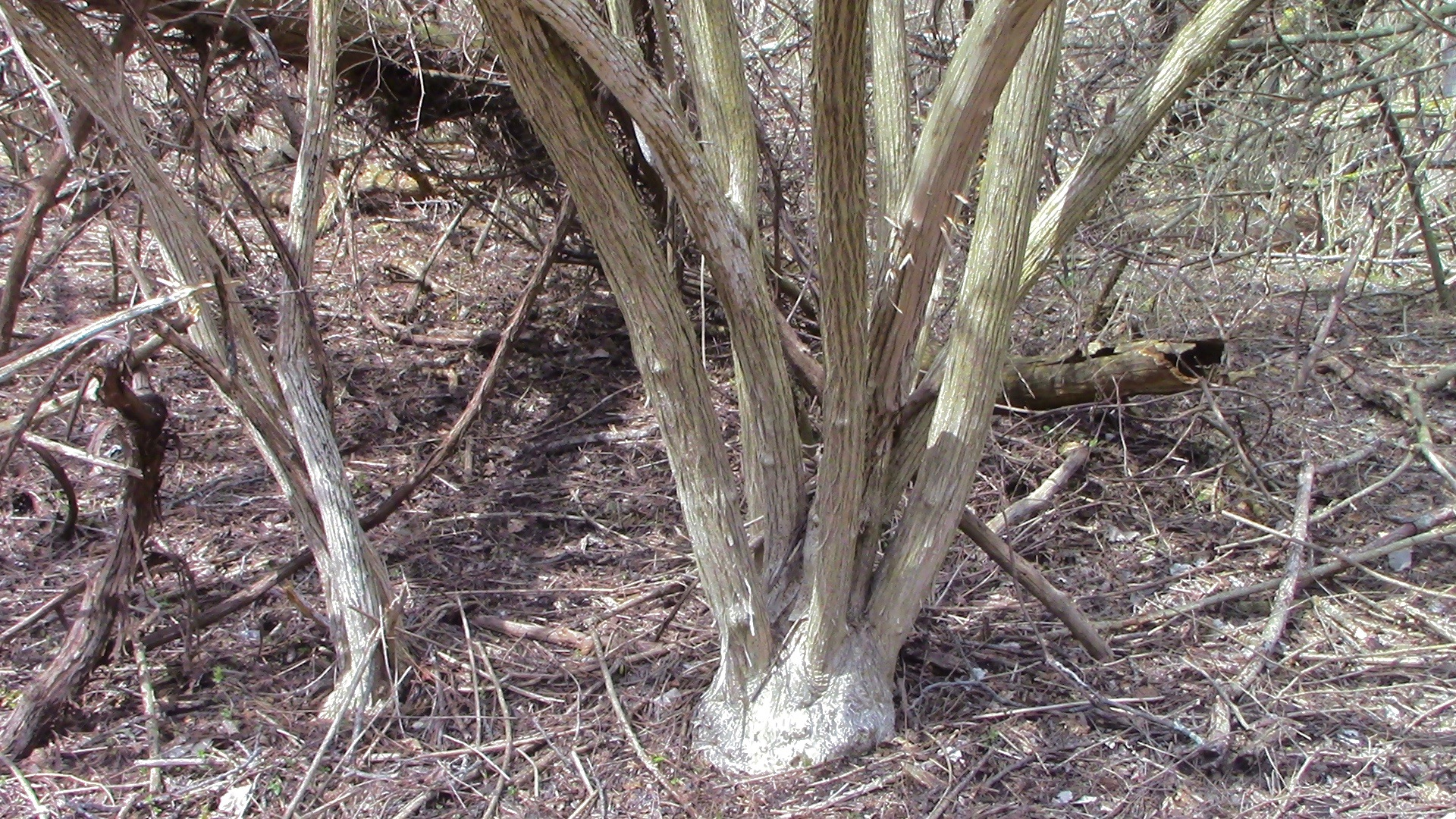
Lonicera maacki dominates the subcanopy along this stretch of the Huron River near Ypsilanti, Michigan.

In the understories of deciduous woodlands of the eastern United States it forms dense thickets, the shade of whose canopies prevent the growth of native shrubs, juvenile trees, and wild flowers. Uncontrolled, these growths result in almost monocultural thickets of Amur honeysuckle. The species gravely jeopardizes not only the diversity of the invaded ecosystems but even the regeneration of woodlands, because it reduces the growth and diversity of native seedlings. Additional studies indicate that it negatively affects birds and tadpoles. However, other studies have shown a mixture of positive and negative effects on birds, depending on species (McNeish and McEwan, 2016). Effects on invertebrate diversity can also be negative or positive, depending on the taxonomic group (Loomis and Cameron, 2014).

Even if L. maackii shrubs are removed, the affected habitat may not recover absent substantial restoration effort.

The relationship between white-tailed deer and L. maackii is complex, with deer playing a significant role in consuming the berries, dispersing the seeds, and browsing the foliage; the presence of L. maackii may prevent deer from browsing understory vegetation, which can be desirable if a native understory is present, but undesirable if other invasive species dominate the understory. A study conducted in the vicinity of St. Louis, Missouri in 2010 indicated that the plant increases the risk of tick-borne diseases such as Erlichiosis and Lyme disease in suburban natural areas by attracting deer and consequently increasing the presence of infected ticks. Furthermore, experimental removal of the plant was shown to reduce deer activity and the number of infected ticks by shifting ticks' blood meals from deer.

=== Control and eradication ===
The species is controlled by cutting, flaming, or burning the plant to the level of its roots and repetition of this in two-week increments until the nutrient reserves in the roots are depleted and unable to produce any new growths. To ensure eradication, herbicide may be applied to freshly cut stumps. Control by prescribed burning has been found to be most effective during the phase of seed dispersal in late summer and early autumn.

It can also be controlled by annual applications of glyphosate that thoroughly saturate the foliage, or by grubbing the shallowly rooted juvenile plants, but these two methods increase labor cost and disrupt the soil. Uprooting by hand or with tools can be effective for small plants, though it becomes difficult or impractical for larger ones.

This species has been found to be a host for the leaf-mining moth Phyllonorycter emberizaepenella in North America. In its native range, Lonicera maackii is a host plant for the following butterflies: Limenitis camilla, Limenitis helmanni, and Limenitis amphyssa.
