= Apiin =

- Apigenin

Names
- IUPAC name 4′,5-Dihydroxy-7-[3-C-(hydroxymethyl)-β-D-erythrofuranosyl-(1→2)-β-D-glucopyranosyloxy]flavone
- Systematic IUPAC name 7-{[(2S,3R,4S,5S,6R)-2-{[(2S,3R,4R)-3,4-Dihydroxy-4-(hydroxymethyl)oxolan-2-yl]oxy}-4,5-dihydroxy-6-(hydroxymethyl)oxan-2-yl]oxy}-5-hydroxy-2-(4-hydroxyphenyl)-4H-1-benzopyran-4-one
- Other names Apioside; Apigenin-7-apioglucoside; Apigenin-7-O-apioglucoside

Identifiers
CAS Number	26544-34-3
3D model (JSmol)	Interactive image
ChEBI	CHEBI:15932
ChEMBL	ChEMBL1535342
ChemSpider	4444321
ECHA InfoCard	100.043.421
EC Number	247-780-0
KEGG	C04858
PubChem CID	5280746
UNII	6QU3EZE37U
CompTox Dashboard (EPA)	DTXSID90949393
- InChI: InChI=1S/C26H28O14/c27-8-18-20(32)21(33)22(40-25-23(34)26(35,9-28)10-36-25)24(39-18)37-13-5-14(30)19-15(31)7-16(38-17(19)6-13)11-1-3-12(29)4-2-11/h1-7,18,20-25,27-30,32-35H,8-10H2/t18-,20-,21+,22-,23+,24-,25+,26-/m1/s1 Key: NTDLXWMIWOECHG-YRCFQSNFSA-N
- SMILES: O=C\4c5c(O)cc(O[C@@H]2O[C@H](CO)[C@@H](O)[C@H](O)[C@H]2O[C@@H]1OC[C@](O)(CO)[C@H]1O)cc5O/C(c3ccc(O)cc3)=C/4

Properties
Chemical formula	C_{26}H_{28}O_{14}
Molar mass	564.496 g·mol^{−1}

Hazards
- GHS labelling
Pictograms	(GHS07: Exclamation mark)
Signal word	Warning
Hazard statements	H315, H319, H335
Precautionary statements	P261, P264, P271, P280, P302+P352, P304+P340, P305+P351+P338, P312, P321, P332+P313, P337+P313, P362, P403+P233, P405, P501
- Except where otherwise noted, data are given for materials in their standard state (at 25 °C [77 °F], 100 kPa). Infobox references

Apiin is a natural flavonoid, a diglycoside of the flavone apigenin found in the winter-hardy plants parsley and celery, and in banana leaf. The glycoside moiety at carbon-7 of apigenin, O-β-D-apiofuranosyl(→)2-β-D-glucosyl, is carried by several other flavones in parsley plant and seed. The sugar apiose possibly play a role in winter hardiness of celery, duckweed and parsley.

== Biosynthesis ==
Apiin is a diglycoside of the flavone, apigenin. Its biosynthesis in plants involves a sequence of enzymes, with chalcone synthase being the one that forms the ring system of the natural product naringenin. Naringenin is then oxidised to apigenin:

naringenin chalcone
Synthase
naringenin
Oxidase
apigenin

Next, the enzyme flavone 7-O-beta-glucosyltransferase transfers a glucose sugar fragment from UDP-glucose, giving apigetrin, with uridine diphosphate (UDP) as byproduct:

apigenin + UDP-glucose
UDP
apigetrin

Finally, apigetrin is converted to apiin when a second apiose sugar is added by the enzyme flavone apiosyltransferase:

apigetrin + UDP-apiose
UDP
apiin
