= Veronicastrum wulingense =

Scientific classification
- Kingdom: Plantae
- Clade: Tracheophytes
- Clade: Angiosperms
- Clade: Eudicots
- Clade: Asterids
- Order: Lamiales
- Family: Plantaginaceae
- Genus: Veronicastrum
- Species: V. wulingense

Binomial name
- Veronicastrum wulingense G.W. Hu & Q.F. Wang

Species of herbaceous plant

Veronicastrum wulingense, known as wu ling fu shui cao (Chinese: 武陵腹水草), is a herbaceous plant in the plantain family Plantaginaceae. It is endemic to a small geographic range in China. The perennial herb is from the genus Veronicastrum, a genus that is used in traditional Chinese medicine. Stemming from the family Plantaginaceae, there are close to twenty species of Veronicastrum, with a primary geographic location in East Asia, though there is one species, Veronicastrum virginicum that is endemic to North America.

== Description ==
The species was found in the Pingbaying National Forest Park, Xianfeng County, Southwestern Hubei, China, in June 2021, close to rocks, along the walkways of a broadleaf forest. Comparisons to other Veronicastrum species found that it was indeed a new species.

=== Morphology ===
Comparison of morphology was done between the new Veronicastrum species and other related Veronicastrum species based on the Flora of China, the Flora of Taiwan, and the Flora of Japan. The new species was also virtually examined in the world's major herbarium in China. The botanists compared twelve other Veronicastrum species from different areas for validation of the species type. Specimens of Pseudolysimachion spicatum (L.) Opiz in China were also collected and prepared. A specific morphological comparison between V. wulingense and the similar species V. liukiuense (Ohwi) T.Yamaz. was done to validate the characteristics of the new species. The specimens of the Veronicastrum wulingense are in the herbarium of Wuhan Botanical Garden (HIB), Chinese Academy of Sciences. DNA extraction and sequencing was done on thirteen samples to construct a phylogenetic tree to show where the new taxon in Veronicastrum should stand.

=== Phenology ===
Veronicastrum wulingense was observed flowering from June to July and produces fruit from August to October.

== Taxonomy ==
The species was first described in 2023. As of April 2023, it was not listed in the International Plant Names Index. The epithet wulingense refers to the Wuling Shan Region, where Veronicastrum wulingense is located and it has been given the Chinese name wu ling fu shui cao (Chinese: 武陵腹水草).
