= Apigetrin =

Names
- IUPAC name 7-(β-D-Glucopyranosyloxy)-4′,5-dihydroxyflavone
- Systematic IUPAC name 5-Hydroxy-2-(4-hydroxyphenyl)-7-{[(2S,3R,4S,5S,6R)-3,4,5-trihydroxy-6-(hydroxymethyl)oxan-2-yl]oxy}-4H-1-benzopyran-4-one
- Other names Apigetrin; Cosmosiine; Cosmetin; Cosmosiin; Cosmosioside; Thalictiin; Cosmosin; Apigenin 7-glucoside; Apigenin 7-O-glucoside

Identifiers
| CAS Number | 578-74-5 |
| 3D model (JSmol) | Interactive image |
| ChEBI | CHEBI:16778 |
| ChEMBL | ChEMBL487017 |
| ChemSpider | 4444290 |
| ECHA InfoCard | 100.008.574 |
| KEGG | C04608 |
| PubChem CID | 5280704 |
| UNII | 7OF2S66PCH |
| CompTox Dashboard (EPA) | DTXSID401028774 |
- InChI: InChI=1S/C21H20O10/c22-8-16-18(26)19(27)20(28)21(31-16)29-11-5-12(24)17-13(25)7-14(30-15(17)6-11)9-1-3-10(23)4-2-9/h1-7,16,18-24,26-28H,8H2/t16-,18-,19+,20-,21-/m1/s1 Key: KMOUJOKENFFTPU-QNDFHXLGSA-N; InChI=1/C21H20O10/c22-8-16-18(26)19(27)20(28)21(31-16)29-11-5-12(24)17-13(25)7-14(30-15(17)6-11)9-1-3-10(23)4-2-9/h1-7,16,18-24,26-28H,8H2/t16-,18-,19+,20-,21-/m1/s1
- SMILES: O=C\3c4c(O)cc(O[C@@H]1O[C@@H]([C@@H](O)[C@H](O)[C@H]1O)CO)cc4O/C(c2ccc(O)cc2)=C/3

Properties
| Chemical formula | C_{21}H_{20}O_{10} |
| Molar mass | 432.381 g·mol^{−1} |
- Except where otherwise noted, data are given for materials in their standard state (at 25 °C [77 °F], 100 kPa). Infobox references

Apigetrin is a chemical compound that can be found in dandelion coffee and in Teucrium gnaphalodes.

== Biosynthesis and metabolism ==
Apigetrin is a glycoside of the flavone, apigenin. Its biosynthesis in plants involves a sequence of enzymes, with chalcone synthase being the one that forms the ring system of the natural product naringenin. Naringenin is then oxidised to apigenin:

naringenin chalcone
Synthase
naringenin
Oxidase
apigenin

Next, the enzyme flavone 7-O-beta-glucosyltransferase transfers the glucose sugar fragment from UDP-glucose, giving apigetrin, with uridine diphosphate (UDP) as byproduct:

apigenin + UDP-glucose
UDP
apigetrin

Apigetrin is further metabolised to apiin when a second apiose sugar is added by the enzyme flavone apiosyltransferase:

apigetrin + UDP-apiose
UDP
apiin
