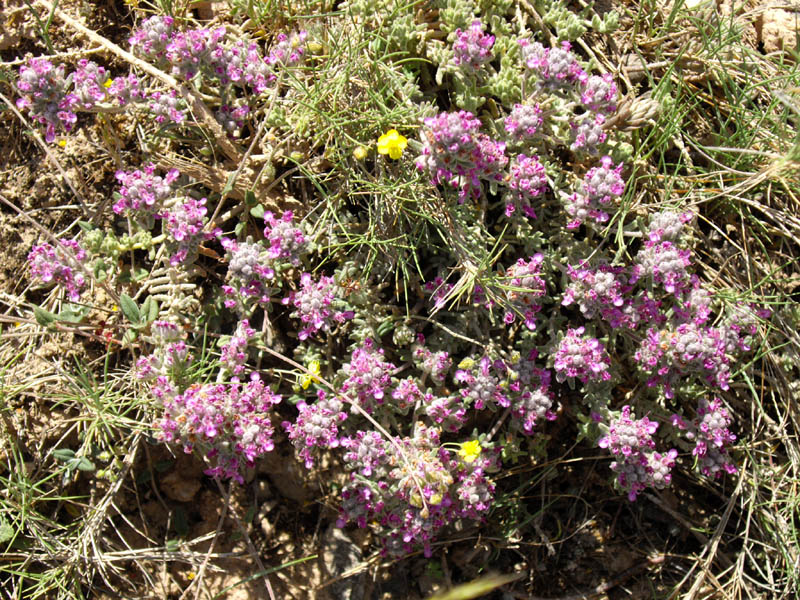

Scientific classification
- Kingdom: Plantae
- Clade: Tracheophytes
- Clade: Angiosperms
- Clade: Eudicots
- Clade: Asterids
- Order: Lamiales
- Family: Lamiaceae
- Genus: Teucrium
- Species: T. gnaphalodes

Binomial name
- Teucrium gnaphalodes L'Her.

Synonyms
- Teucrium polium subsp. gnaphalodes (L'Her.) O. Bolòs & Vigo

= Teucrium gnaphalodes =

Species of flowering plant

Teucrium gnaphalodes is a plant species in the genus Teucrium. It is endemic to the Iberian Peninsula and grows at altitudes between 200 and 1500 m. It flowers from March to July.

The flavones diosmin, cirsimaritin, salvigenin, cirsilineol, cirsiliol, luteolin, apigenin and the flavanone naringenin, as well as the flavone glycosides luteolin-7-O-β-D-glucoside and apigenin-7-O-β-D-glucoside, and the diglycosides luteolin-7-O-β-D-rutinoside, luteolin-7-O-β-D-neohesperidoside (veronicastroside) and luteolin-7-O-β-D-sambubioside can be found in T. gnaphalodes.
