= Veronicastroside =

- Chemical structure of veronicastroside

Names
- IUPAC name 3′,4′,5-Trihydroxy-7-[α-L-rhamnopyranosyl-(1→2)-β-D-glucopyranosyloxy]flavone
- Systematic IUPAC name 7-{[(2S,3R,4S,5S,6R)-4,5-Dihydroxy-6-(hydroxymethyl)-2-{[(2S,3R,4R,5R,6S)-3,4,5-trihydroxy-6-methyloxan-2-yl]oxy}oxan-2-yl]oxy}-2-(3,4-dihydroxyphenyl)-5-hydroxy-4H-1-benzopyran-4-one
- Other names Luteolin 7-O-neohesperidoside; Scolymoside; Lonicerin; Luteolin-7-rutinoside; Luteoline-7-rhamnoglucoside

Identifiers
CAS Number	25694-72-8
3D model (JSmol)	Interactive image
ChemSpider	4445349
KEGG	C12630
PubChem CID	5282152
UNII	ALJ2FB4ZDM
CompTox Dashboard (EPA)	DTXSID30180389
- InChI: InChI=1S/C27H30O15/c1-9-20(33)22(35)24(37)26(38-9)42-25-23(36)21(34)18(8-28)41-27(25)39-11-5-14(31)19-15(32)7-16(40-17(19)6-11)10-2-3-12(29)13(30)4-10/h2-7,9,18,20-31,33-37H,8H2,1H3/t9-,18+,20-,21+,22+,23-,24+,25+,26-,27+/m0/s1 Key: SHPPXMGVUDNKLV-KMFFXDMSSA-N; InChI=1/C27H30O15/c1-9-20(33)22(35)24(37)26(38-9)42-25-23(36)21(34)18(8-28)41-27(25)39-11-5-14(31)19-15(32)7-16(40-17(19)6-11)10-2-3-12(29)13(30)4-10/h2-7,9,18,20-31,33-37H,8H2,1H3/t9-,18+,20-,21+,22+,23-,24+,25+,26-,27+/m0/s1 Key: SHPPXMGVUDNKLV-KMFFXDMSBP
- SMILES: C[C@H]1[C@@H]([C@H]([C@H]([C@@H](O1)O[C@@H]2[C@H]([C@@H]([C@H](O[C@H]2Oc3cc(c4c(=O)cc(oc4c3)c5ccc(c(c5)O)O)O)CO)O)O)O)O)O

Properties
Chemical formula	C_{27}H_{30}O_{15}
Molar mass	594.52 g/mol
- Except where otherwise noted, data are given for materials in their standard state (at 25 °C [77 °F], 100 kPa). Infobox references

Veronicastroside (identical to Lonicerin) is a flavone, a type of flavonoid. It is the 7-O-neohesperidoside of luteolin. It can be found in Veronicastrum sibiricum var. japonicum and in Teucrium gnaphalodes.
