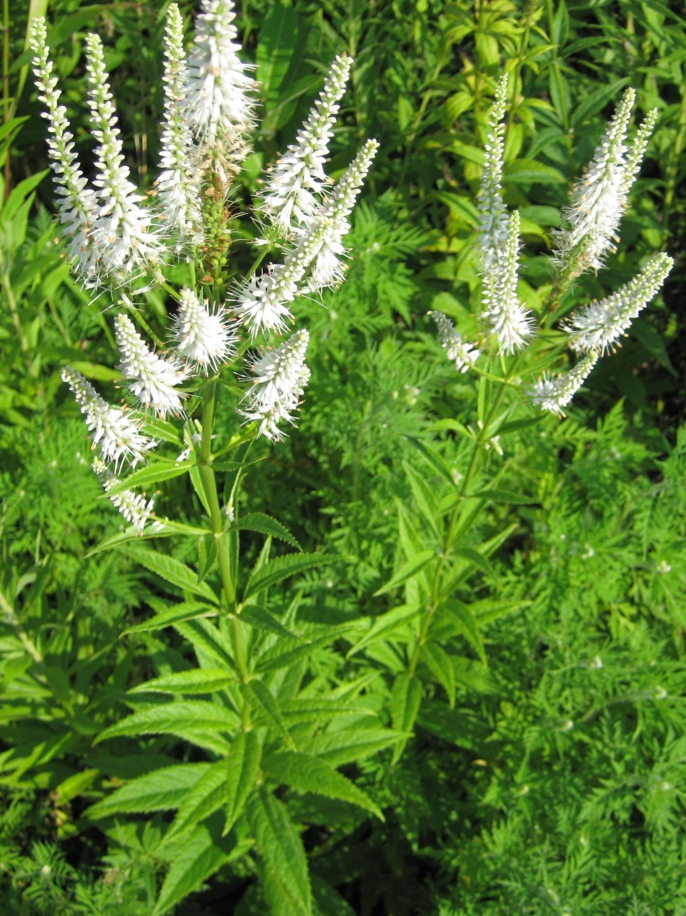
- Veronicastrum virginicum

Scientific classification
- Kingdom: Plantae
- Clade: Tracheophytes
- Clade: Angiosperms
- Clade: Eudicots
- Clade: Asterids
- Order: Lamiales
- Family: Plantaginaceae
- Tribe: Veroniceae
- Genus: Veronicastrum; Heist. ex Fabr.

= Veronicastrum =

Genus of flowering plants

Veronicastrum is a genus of flowering plants in the family Plantaginaceae. In some taxonomy systems, Veronicastrum species have been placed within the genus Veronica. The most commonly cultivated species is Veronicastrum virginicum, which is native to the Eastern parts of North America. Veronicastrum has previously been part of the family Scrophulariaceae. However, following recent genetic studies, several genera were transferred to other families including Veronicastrum, transferred to Plantaginaceae.

== Species of genus Veronicastrum ==
- Veronicastrum borissovae
- Veronicastrum cerasifolium
- Veronicastrum sachalinense
- Veronicastrum sibiricum, Sibirian veronicastrum
- Veronicastrum tubiflorum
- Veronicastrum virginicum, Culver's root, eastern North America.
- Veronicastrum wulingense
