= Papaipema sciata =

Scientific classification
- Kingdom: Animalia
- Phylum: Arthropoda
- Clade: Pancrustacea
- Class: Insecta
- Order: Lepidoptera
- Superfamily: Noctuoidea
- Family: Noctuidae
- Genus: Papaipema
- Species: P. sciata

Binomial name
- Papaipema sciata Bird, 1908

Species of moth

Papaipema sciata, or Culver's root borer moth, is a species of moth found in North America, where it has been recorded from Connecticut, Maine, New York, New Jersey, Iowa, Michigan, Missouri, Minnesota, Illinois, Wisconsin, and North Dakota. It is listed as a species of special concern and believed extirpated in the US state of Connecticut. The species was first described by Henry Bird in 1908.

The wingspan is about 40 mm.

The larvae feed on Veronicastrum virginicum. They bore the roots of their host plant.
