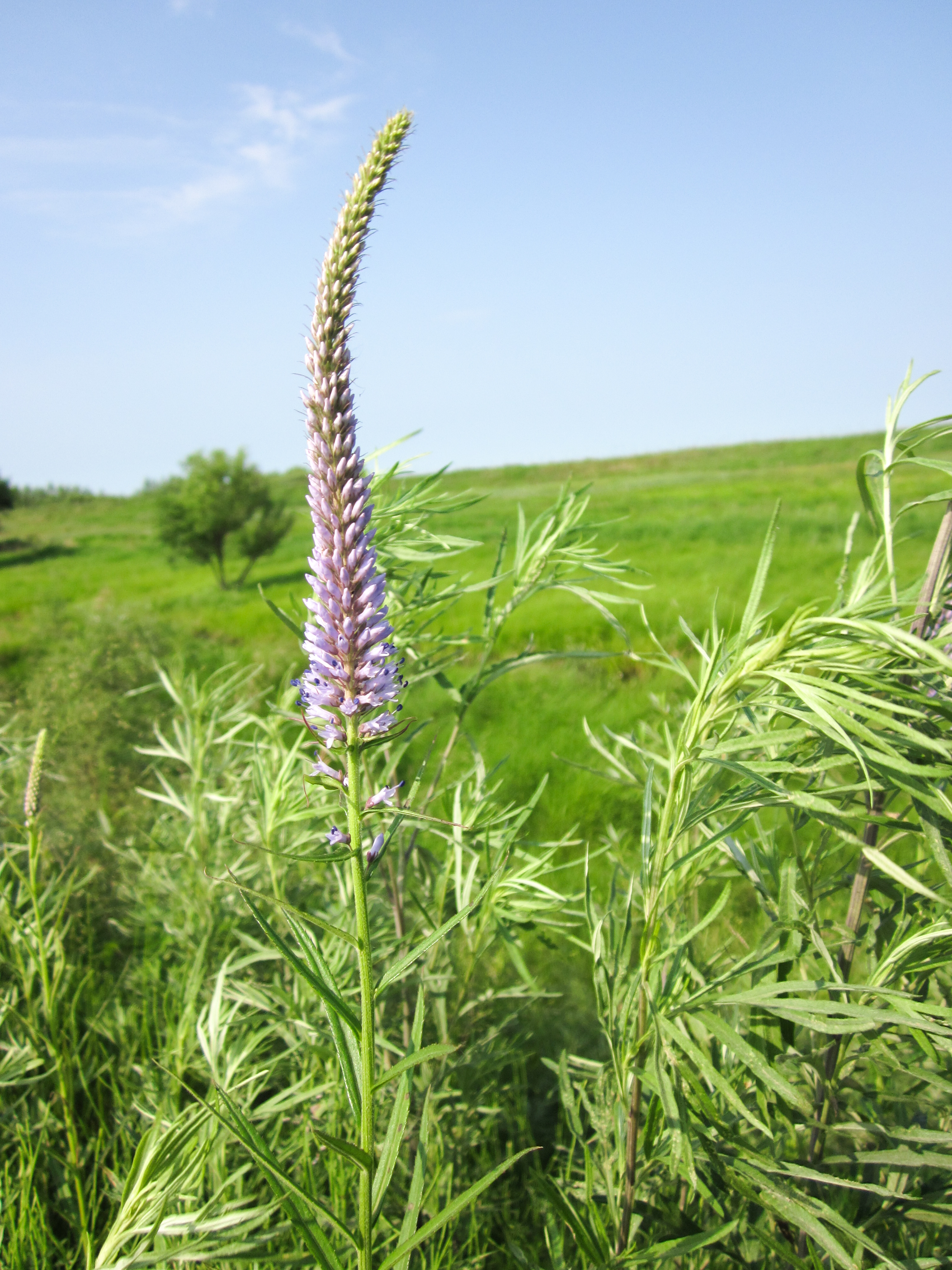
- Veronicastrum tubiflorum near the Ussuri River

Scientific classification
- Kingdom: Plantae
- Clade: Tracheophytes
- Clade: Angiosperms
- Clade: Eudicots
- Clade: Asterids
- Order: Lamiales
- Family: Plantaginaceae
- Genus: Veronicastrum
- Species: V. tubiflorum

Binomial name
- Veronicastrum tubiflorum (Fisch. & C.A.Mey.) H.Hara

= Veronicastrum tubiflorum =

Species of flowering plant

Veronicastrum tubiflorum, is a plant species in the family Plantaginaceae, native to eastern Asia. It is commonly found in meadows and thickets. The pale blue or pink flowers appear from June to August, and the plant ranges in size from 40 to 70 cm.
