= Flavone apiosyltransferase =

Class of enzymes

Identifiers
- EC no.: 2.4.2.25
- CAS no.: 37332-49-3

Databases
- IntEnz: IntEnz view
- BRENDA: BRENDA entry
- ExPASy: NiceZyme view
- KEGG: KEGG entry
- MetaCyc: metabolic pathway
- PRIAM: profile
- PDB structures: RCSB PDB PDBe PDBsum
- Gene Ontology: AmiGO / QuickGO
Search
- PMC: articles
- PubMed: articles
- NCBI: proteins

Flavone apiosyltransferase (EC 2.4.2.25) is an enzyme that catalyzes the chemical reaction

apigetrin
+ UDP-apiose
UDP
apiin

The two substrates of this enzyme are the flavone, apigetrin, and UDP-apiose, which transfers its apiose sugar unit to one of the hydroxy groups in the glycosyl ring of the starting material to give apiin, with uridine diphosphate (UDP) as a byproduct.

This enzyme belongs to the family of glycosyltransferases, specifically the pentosyltransferases. The systematic name of this enzyme class is UDP-apiose:5,4'-dihydroxyflavone 7-O-beta-D-glucoside 2''-O-beta-D-apiofuranosyltransferase. Other names in common use include uridine diphosphoapiose-flavone apiosyltransferase, and UDP-apiose:7-O-(beta-D-glucosyl)-flavone apiosyltransferase.
