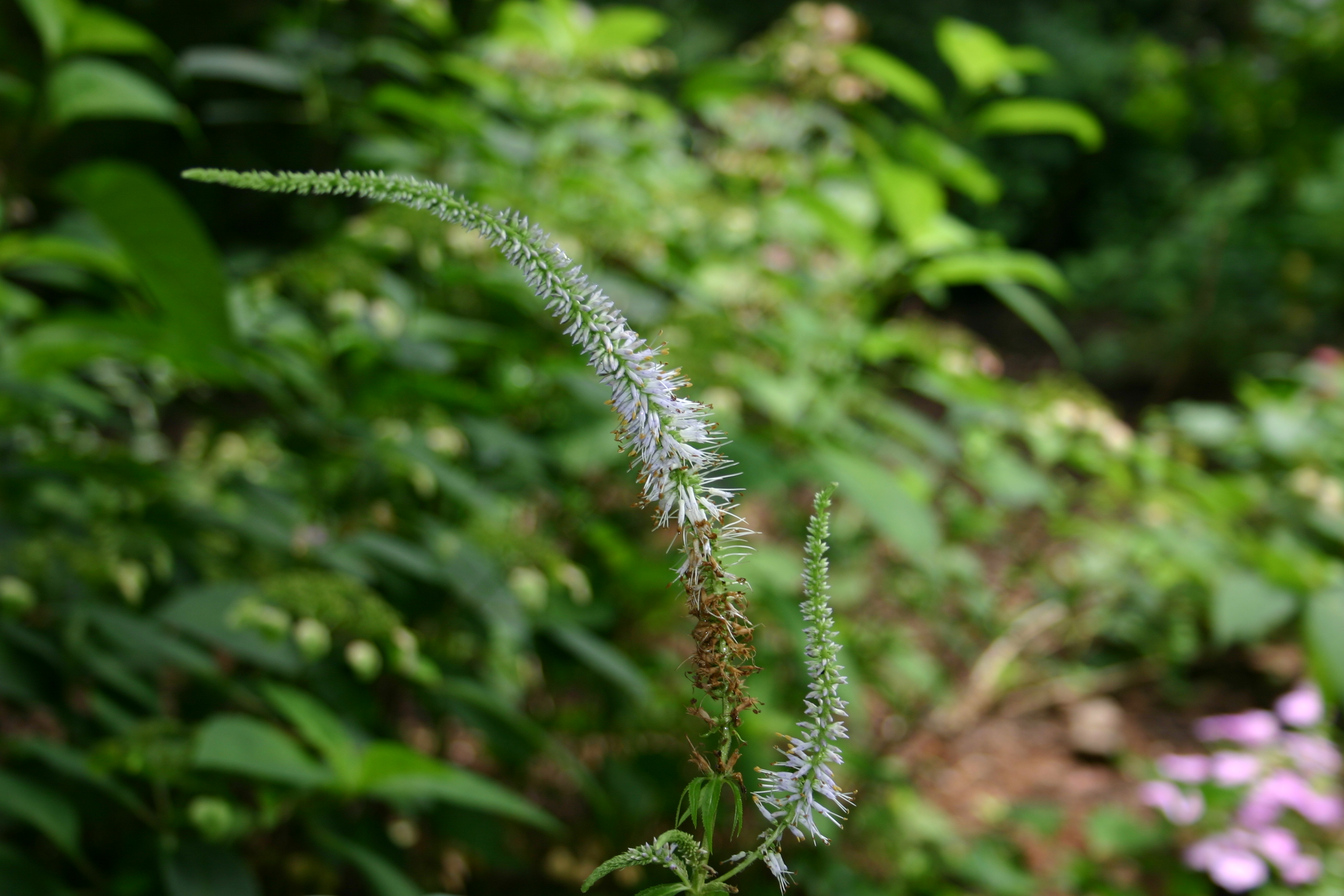
- Inflorescence

Scientific classification
- Kingdom: Plantae
- Clade: Tracheophytes
- Clade: Angiosperms
- Clade: Eudicots
- Clade: Asterids
- Order: Lamiales
- Family: Plantaginaceae
- Genus: Veronicastrum
- Species: V. sibiricum

Binomial name
- Veronicastrum sibiricum (L.) Pennell, 1935

= Veronicastrum sibiricum =

Sibirian veronicastrum

Species of flowering plant

Veronicastrum sibiricum, the Sibirian veronicastrum, is a plant in the plantain family Plantaginaceae.

== Description ==
Veronicastrum sibiricum is a herbaceous plant with whorled, simple leaves, on weakly upright stems. The flowers are pale purple, borne in summer.

Veronicastroside, a flavone, can be found in Veronicastrum sibiricum var. japonicum.
