= Apiose 1-reductase =

apiose 1-reductase

Identifiers
- EC no.: 1.1.1.114
- CAS no.: 37250-45-6

Databases
- IntEnz: IntEnz view
- BRENDA: BRENDA entry
- ExPASy: NiceZyme view
- KEGG: KEGG entry
- MetaCyc: metabolic pathway
- PRIAM: profile
- PDB structures: RCSB PDB PDBe PDBsum
- Gene Ontology: AmiGO / QuickGO
Search
- PMC: articles
- PubMed: articles
- NCBI: proteins

In enzymology, apiose 1-reductase (EC 1.1.1.114) is an enzyme that catalyzes the chemical reaction

D-Apiitol
+ NAD^{+}
H^{+}
H^{+}
D-Apiose
+ NADH

The two substrates of this enzyme are D-apiitol and oxidised nicotinamide adenine dinucleotide (NAD^{+}). Its products are D-apiose, reduced NADH, and a proton.

This enzyme belongs to the family of oxidoreductases, specifically those acting on the CH-OH group of donor with NAD^{+} or NADP^{+} as acceptor. The systematic name of this enzyme class is D-apiitol:NAD^{+} 1-oxidoreductase. Other names in common use include D-apiose reductase, and D-apiitol reductase.
