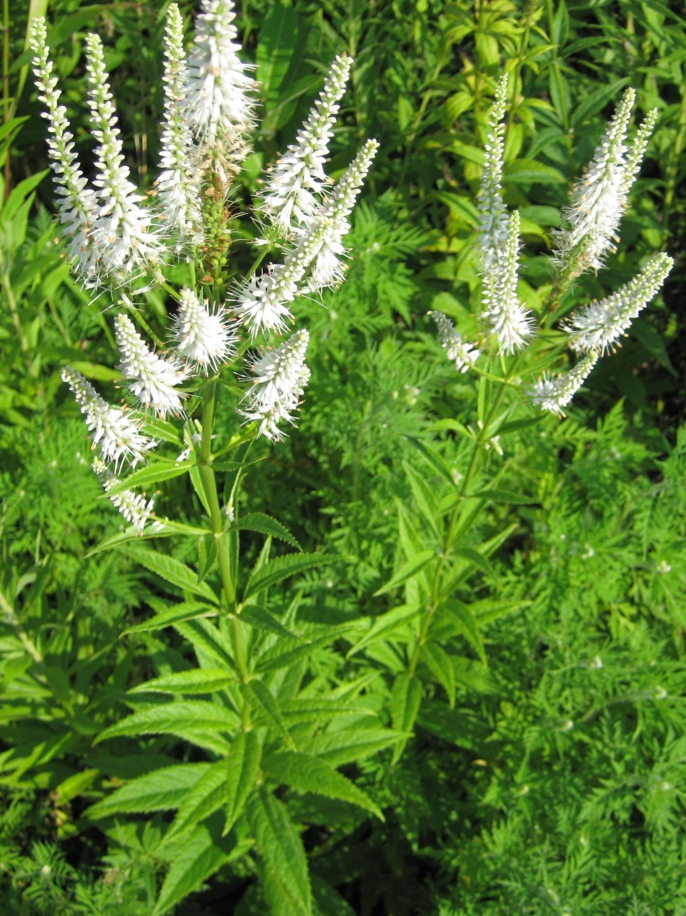

Scientific classification
- Kingdom: Plantae
- Clade: Tracheophytes
- Clade: Angiosperms
- Clade: Eudicots
- Clade: Asterids
- Order: Lamiales
- Family: Plantaginaceae
- Genus: Veronicastrum
- Species: V. virginicum

Binomial name
- Veronicastrum virginicum (L.) Farw.

Synonyms
- Leptandra virginica (L.) Nutt.; Veronica virginica L.

= Veronicastrum virginicum =

Culver's root

Species of flowering plant

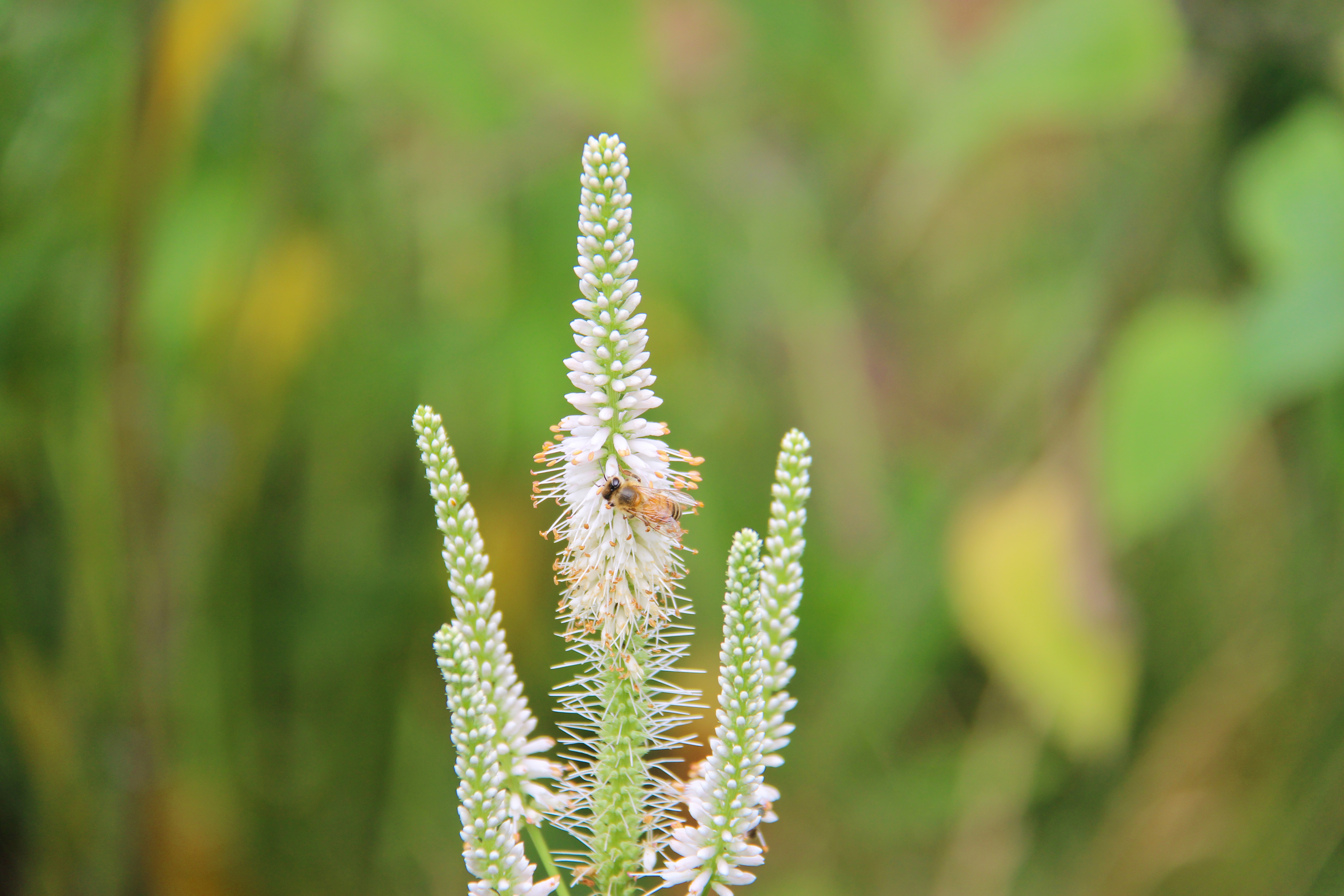
A bee on a Culver's Root (Veronicastrum virginicum) flower.

Veronicastrum virginicum, or Culver's root, is a species of flowering plant in the plantain family, Plantaginaceae. It is native to the eastern United States and south-eastern Canada. Growing to 200 cm (79 in) tall by 45 cm (18 in) broad, it is an erect herbaceous perennial with slender racemes of white or occasionally pink or purple flowers in summer.

== Names and etymology ==
Other names and variants include Culver's-root, Culverphysic, Culver's physic, black root. The Latin specific epithet virginicum means "of Virginia", referring to a historic definition covering the entire eastern USA and southeastern Canada, (which roughly corresponds to its current distribution). The name "Culver's root" derives from a certain Dr. Culver who was a pioneer physician of the 18th century and used its bitter roots for purgative purposes.

== Description ==
The stems are hairless and usually unbranched. The leaves are serrated and arranged in whorls of 3-7 around the stem. The inflorescence is erect with slender and spike-like racemes to about 9 in (23 cm) long, giving the flower cluster a candelabra-like appearance. The stamens are crowded and protrude in a brush-like fashion perpendicular to the raceme. The corollas are white and are roughly 2mm in length. These plants flower for about a month from mid-June to late August, depending on the latitude.

== Distribution and habitat ==
Veronicastrum virginicum is found from southern Maine to northwest Florida to northern Louisiana up through Minnesota and somewhat north of the Canada–US border. Culver's root is frequently found in wet to wet-mesic prairies and sometimes moist upland sites. It is also found in a good number of prairie or native meadow restorations.

== Cultivation ==
Veronicastrum virginicum is cultivated as an ornamental for temperate gardens in the Eastern and Central United States around its native range. Most native plant nurseries commonly sell this easy and adaptable perennial. Even some conventional nurseries sell this plant, though it is not common yet in American landscapes and gardens. It is fully hardy down to at least −20 °C (−4 °F), and grows in full sun to part shade and any moist, well-drained soil. It is easy to dig up, divide, and reset like a good number of standard perennials if they get too large or crowded. It stays as an upright clump and does not spread far. Plants rarely need staking; however, older clumps may require this. It can be pruned down in late May or dug up, divided, and reset. This plant does do some self-sowing with its tiny seed.

In the UK the cultivars 'Album', with white flowers, and 'Lavendelturm', with lilac flowers, have gained the Royal Horticultural Society's Award of Garden Merit.

== Ecology ==
The larvae of the Culver's root borer moth feed on this plant.
