= Apiose =

- Chemical structure of apiose

Names
- IUPAC name 3-C-(Hydroxymethyl)-glycero-tetrose
- Systematic IUPAC name 2,3,4-Trihydroxy-3-(hydroxymethyl)butanal
- Other names: D-Apiose 3-C-(Hydroxymethyl)-D-glycerotetrose; Apio-β-D-furanose

Identifiers
| CAS Number | 639-97-4 |
| 3D model (JSmol) | Interactive image |
| ChEBI | CHEBI:141215 |
| ChemSpider | 16735670 |
| KEGG | C21040 |
| PubChem CID | 12306753 |
| UNII | E59T26TCEC |
- InChI: InChI=1S/C5H10O5/c6-1-5(9)2-10-4(8)3(5)7/h3-4,6-9H,1-2H2/t3-,4?,5+/m0/s1 Key: ASNHGEVAWNWCRQ-LJJLCWGRSA-N; InChI=1/C5H10O5/c6-1-5(9)2-10-4(8)3(5)7/h3-4,6-9H,1-2H2/t3-,4?,5+/m0/s1 Key: ASNHGEVAWNWCRQ-LJJLCWGRBE
- SMILES: O[C@]1(CO)COC(O)[C@@H]1O

Properties
| Chemical formula | C_{5}H_{10}O_{5} |
| Molar mass | 150.130 g·mol^{−1} |
- Except where otherwise noted, data are given for materials in their standard state (at 25 °C [77 °F], 100 kPa). verify (what is ?) Infobox references

Apiose is a branched-chain sugar found as residues in galacturonans-type pectins; that occurs in parsley and many other plants. Apiose is a component of cell wall polysaccharides.

Apiose 1-reductase uses D-apiitol and NAD^{+} to produce apiitol-apiose, NADH, and H^{+}.

Flavone apiosyltransferase uses UDP-apiose and 5,7,4'-trihydroxyflavone 7-O-β-D-glucoside to produce UDP, 5,7,4'-trihydroxyflavone (apigenin), and 7-O-β-D-apiosyl-(1->2)-β-apiitol-glucoside.
