= Cynaroside =

Names
- IUPAC name 7-(β-D-Glucopyranosyloxy)-3′,4′,5-trihydroxysexflavone
- Systematic IUPAC name 2-(3,4-Dihydroxyphenyl)-5-hydroxy-7-{[(2S,3R,4S,5S,6R)-3,4,5-trihydroxy-69-(hydroxymethyl)oxan-2-yl]oxy}-4H-1-benzopyran-4-one
- Other names Glucoluteolin; Luteoloside; Cinaroside; 7-Glucoluteolin; 7-Glucosylluteolin; Luteolin 7-glucoside Luteolin-7-glucoside; Luteolin 7-O-glucoside; Luteolin-7-O-glucoside

Identifiers
CAS Number	5373-11-5
3D model (JSmol)	Interactive image
ChEBI	CHEBI:27994
ChemSpider	4444241
ECHA InfoCard	100.023.968
KEGG	C03951
PubChem CID	5280637
UNII	98J6XDS46I
CompTox Dashboard (EPA)	DTXSID50949617
- InChI: InChI=1S/C21H20O11/c22-7-16-18(27)19(28)20(29)21(32-16)30-9-4-12(25)17-13(26)6-14(31-15(17)5-9)8-1-2-10(23)11(24)3-8/h1-6,16,18-25,27-29H,7H2/t16-,18-,19+,20-,21-/m1/s1 Key: PEFNSGRTCBGNAN-QNDFHXLGSA-N
- SMILES: C1=CC(=C(C=C1C2=CC(=O)C3=C(C=C(C=C3O2)O[C@H]4[C@@H]([C@H]([C@@H]([C@H](O4)CO)O)O)O)O)O)O

Properties
Chemical formula	C_{21}H_{20}O_{11}
Molar mass	4488.37 g/mol
Appearance	Yellow amorphous powder
Melting point	266 to 268 °C (511 to 514 °F; 539 to 541 K)
- Except where otherwise noted, data are given for materials in their standard state (at 25 °C [77 °F], 100 kPa). Infobox references

Cynaroside (also known as luteoloside) is a flavone, a flavonoid-like chemical compound. It is a 7-O-glucoside of luteolin.

== Natural occurrences ==
It can be found in Ferula varia and F. foetida in Campanula persicifolia and C. rotundifolia, in the bamboo Phyllostachys nigra, and in Teucrium gnaphalodes.

In food

It can be found in dandelion (the highest concentration in the flowers, but also in the roots) and in Cynara scolymus (artichoke).

== Biosynthesis and metabolism ==
Flavone 7-O-beta-glucosyltransferase, characterised from parsley, forms the glucoside of the flavone, luteolin.

luteolin
+ UDP-glucose
UDP
cynaroside

The glucose unit is transferred from uridine diphosphate glucose, with uridine diphosphate (UDP) as byproduct.

A cynaroside 7-O-glucosidase has been identified in the artichoke.
