= Flavone 7-O-beta-glucosyltransferase =

Class of enzymes

Identifiers
- EC no.: 2.4.1.81
- CAS no.: 37332-50-6

Databases
- IntEnz: IntEnz view
- BRENDA: BRENDA entry
- ExPASy: NiceZyme view
- KEGG: KEGG entry
- MetaCyc: metabolic pathway
- PRIAM: profile
- PDB structures: RCSB PDB PDBe PDBsum
- Gene Ontology: AmiGO / QuickGO
Search
- PMC: articles
- PubMed: articles
- NCBI: proteins

Flavone 7-O-beta-glucosyltransferase (EC 2.4.1.81) is an enzyme that catalyzes the chemical reaction

luteolin
+ UDP-glucose
UDP
cynaroside

The two substrates of this enzyme characterised from parsley are the flavone, luteolin, and UDP-glucose. Its products are cynaroside and uridine diphosphate (UDP).

This enzyme belongs to the family of glycosyltransferases, specifically the hexosyltransferases. The systematic name of this enzyme class is UDP-glucose:5,7,3',4'-tetrahydroxyflavone 7-O-beta-D-glucosyltransferase. Other names in common use include UDP-glucose-apigenin beta-glucosyltransferase, UDP-glucose-luteolin beta-D-glucosyltransferase, uridine diphosphoglucose-luteolin glucosyltransferase, uridine diphosphoglucose-apigenin 7-O-glucosyltransferase, and UDP-glucosyltransferase. This enzyme participates in flavonoid biosynthesis.
