= Apigenin =

Chemical in plants

- Apigenin

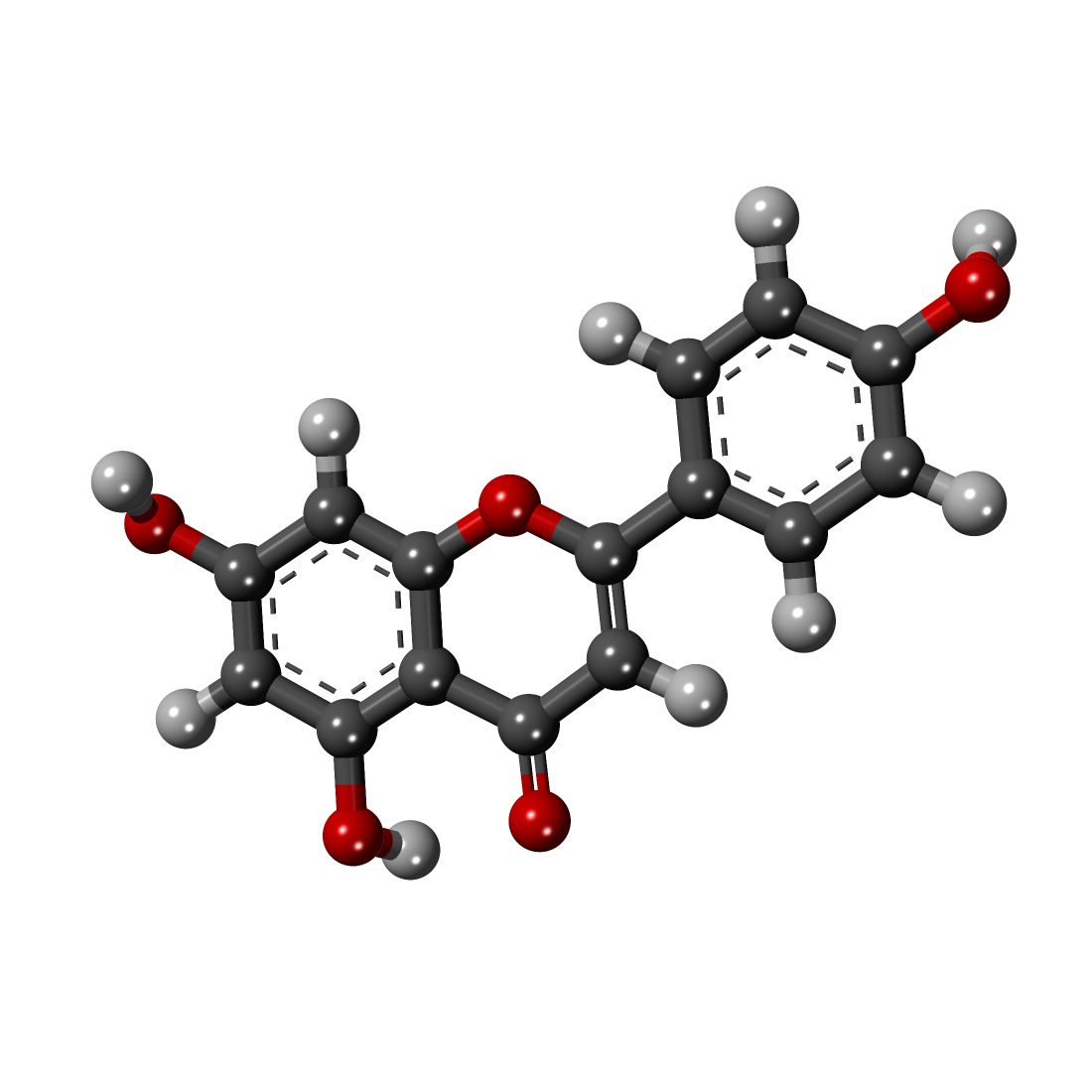

Names
- IUPAC name 4′,5,7-Trihydroxyflavone
- Systematic IUPAC name 5,7-Dihydroxy-2-(4-hydroxyphenyl)-4H-1-benzopyran-4-one
- Other names Apigenine; Chamomile; Apigenol; Spigenin; Versulin; C.I. Natural Yellow 1

Identifiers
CAS Number	520-36-5
3D model (JSmol)	Interactive image
ChEBI	CHEBI:18388
ChEMBL	ChEMBL28
ChemSpider	4444100
DrugBank	DB07352
ECHA InfoCard	100.007.540
EC Number	208-292-3
IUPHAR/BPS	4136
KEGG	C01477
PubChem CID	5280443
UNII	7V515PI7F6
CompTox Dashboard (EPA)	DTXSID6022391
- InChI: InChI=1S/C15H10O5/c16-9-3-1-8(2-4-9)13-7-12(19)15-11(18)5-10(17)6-14(15)20-13/h1-7,16-18H Key: KZNIFHPLKGYRTM-UHFFFAOYSA-N
- SMILES: O=C\1c3c(O/C(=C/1)c2ccc(O)cc2)cc(O)cc3O

Properties
Chemical formula	C_{15}H_{10}O_{5}
Molar mass	270.240 g·mol^{−1}
Appearance	Yellow crystalline solid
Melting point	345 to 350 °C (653 to 662 °F; 618 to 623 K)
UV-vis (λ_{max})	267, 296sh, 336 nm in methanol
- Except where otherwise noted, data are given for materials in their standard state (at 25 °C [77 °F], 100 kPa). Infobox references

Apigenin (4′,5,7-trihydroxyflavone), found in many plants, is a flavone compound that is the aglycone of several naturally occurring glycosides. It is a yellow crystalline solid that has been used to dye wool.

Apigenin is abundant in parsley, celery, celeriac, and chamomile flowers. It occurs in many fruits and vegetables, with the highest concentrations in dried and fresh parsley.

== Sources in nature ==
Apigenin is found in many fruits and vegetables, but parsley, celery, celeriac, and chamomile tea are the most common sources. Apigenin is particularly abundant in the flowers of chamomile plants, constituting 68% of total flavonoids. Dried parsley can contain about 45 mg apigenin per gram. The apigenin content of fresh parsley is reportedly 215 mg per 100 grams, which is much higher than the next highest food source.

== Pharmacology ==
In vitro, apigenin binds competitively to the benzodiazepine site on GABA_{A} receptors. There exist conflicting findings regarding how apigenin interacts with this site.

== Biosynthesis ==
Apigenin is biosynthetically derived from the general phenylpropanoid pathway and the flavone synthesis pathway. The phenylpropanoid pathway starts from the aromatic amino acids L-phenylalanine or L-tyrosine, both products of the Shikimate pathway. When starting from L-phenylalanine, first the amino acid is non-oxidatively deaminated by phenylalanine ammonia lyase to make cinnamate, followed by oxidation at the para position by cinnamate 4-hydroxylase to produce p-coumarate. As L-tyrosine is already oxidized at the para position, it skips this oxidation and is simply deaminated by tyrosine ammonia lyase to arrive at p-coumarate. To complete the general phenylpropanoid pathway, 4-coumarate CoA ligase substitutes coenzyme A at the carboxy group of p-coumarate. Entering the flavone synthesis pathway, the type III polyketide synthase enzyme chalcone synthase uses consecutive condensations of three equivalents of malonyl-CoA followed by aromatization to convert p-coumaroyl-CoA to chalcone. Chalcone isomerase then isomerizes the product to close the pyrone ring to make naringenin. Finally, a flavanone synthase enzyme oxidizes naringenin to apigenin. Two types of flavone synthase (FNS) have been described; FNS I, a soluble enzyme that uses 2-oxogluturate, Fe^{2+}, and ascorbate as cofactors and FNS II, a membrane bound, NADPH dependent cytochrome p450 monooxygenase.

== Glycosides ==
The naturally occurring glycosides formed by the combination of apigenin with sugars include:

- Apiin (apigenin 7-O-apioglucoside), isolated from parsley and celery
- Apigetrin (apigenin 7-glucoside), found in dandelion coffee
- Vitexin (apigenin 8-C-glucoside)
- Isovitexin (apigenin 6-C-glucoside)
- Rhoifolin (apigenin 7-O-neohesperidoside)
- Schaftoside (apigenin 6-C-glucoside 8-C-arabinoside)

== In diet ==
Some foods contain relatively high amounts of apigenin:

Product	Apigenin (milligrams per 100 grams)
Parsley, dried	4503.5
Parsley, fresh	215.5
Celery hearts, green	19.1
Rutabagas, raw	4

== See also ==
- Amentoflavone
