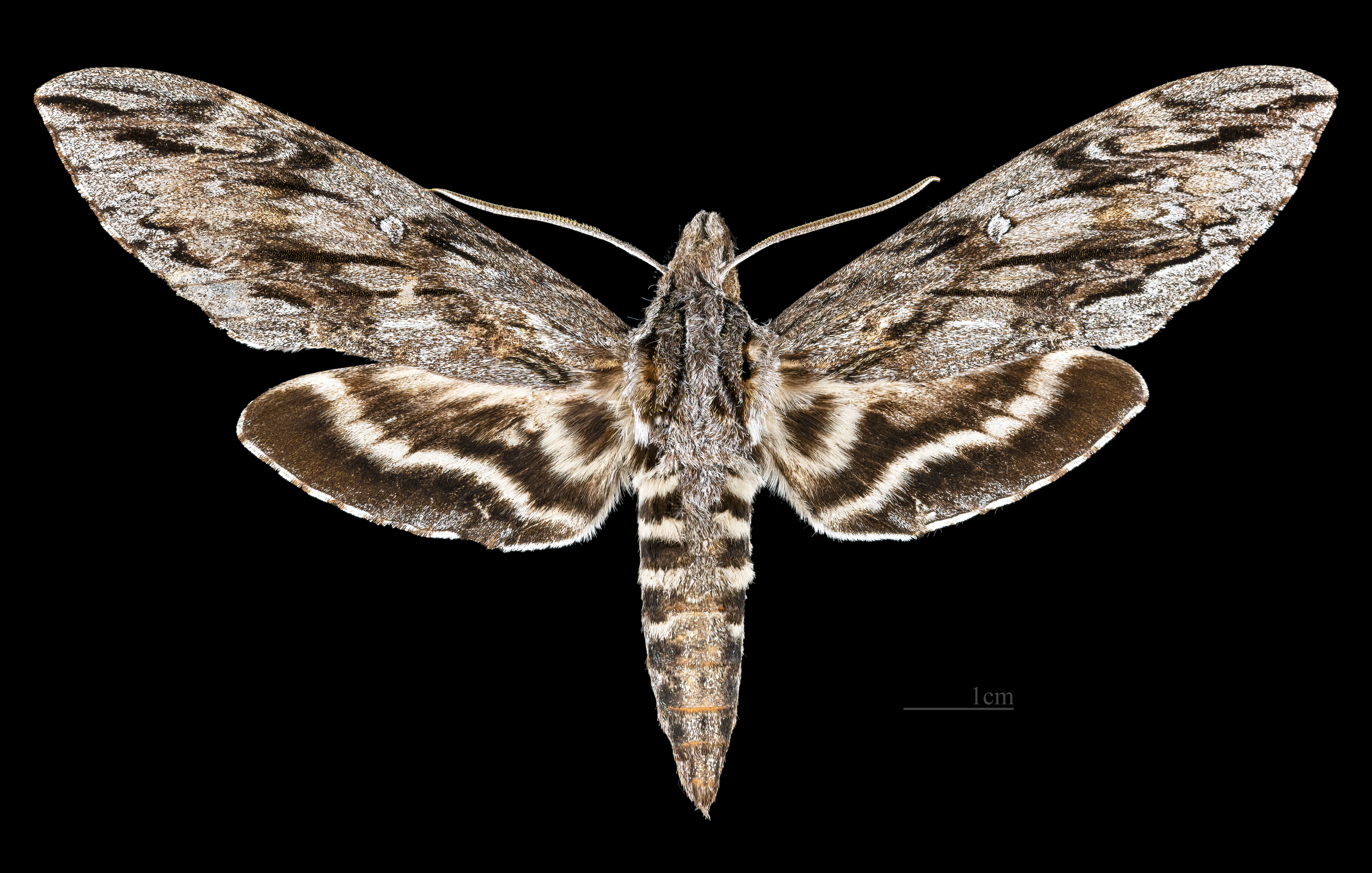
- Lintneria praelongus ♂
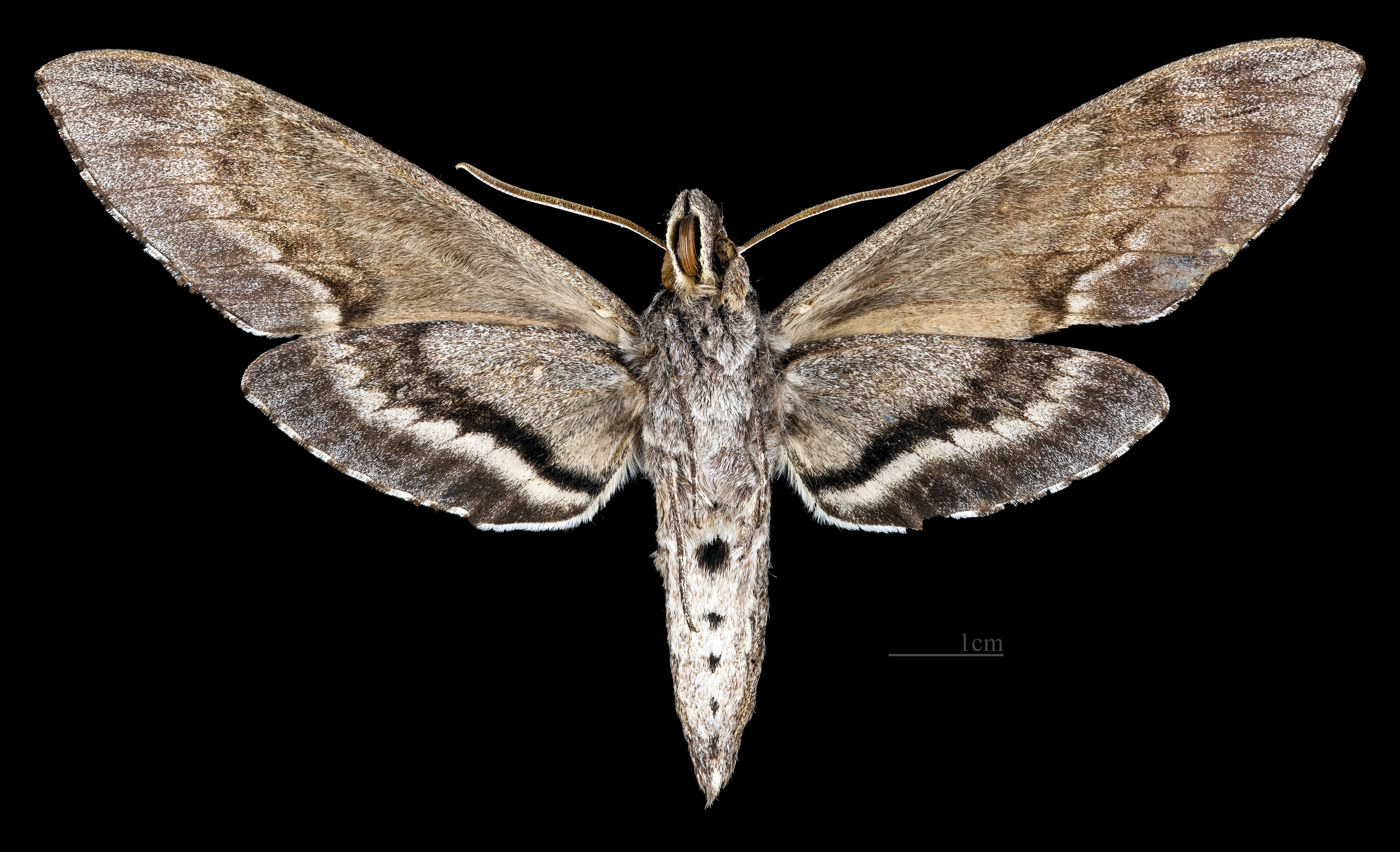
- Lintneria praelongus♂ △

Scientific classification
- Domain: Eukaryota
- Kingdom: Animalia
- Phylum: Arthropoda
- Class: Insecta
- Order: Lepidoptera
- Family: Sphingidae
- Genus: Lintneria
- Species: L. praelongus

Binomial name
- Lintneria praelongus (Rothschild & Jordan, 1903)

Synonyms
- Sphinx praelongus; Hyloicus praelongus Rothschild & Jordan, 1903

= Lintneria praelongus =

Species of moth

Lintneria praelongus is a moth of the family Sphingidae.

== Distribution ==
It is known from Honduras and Guatemala.

== Description ==
It is similar to Lintneria istar but more greyish white and the forewings are more elongate.

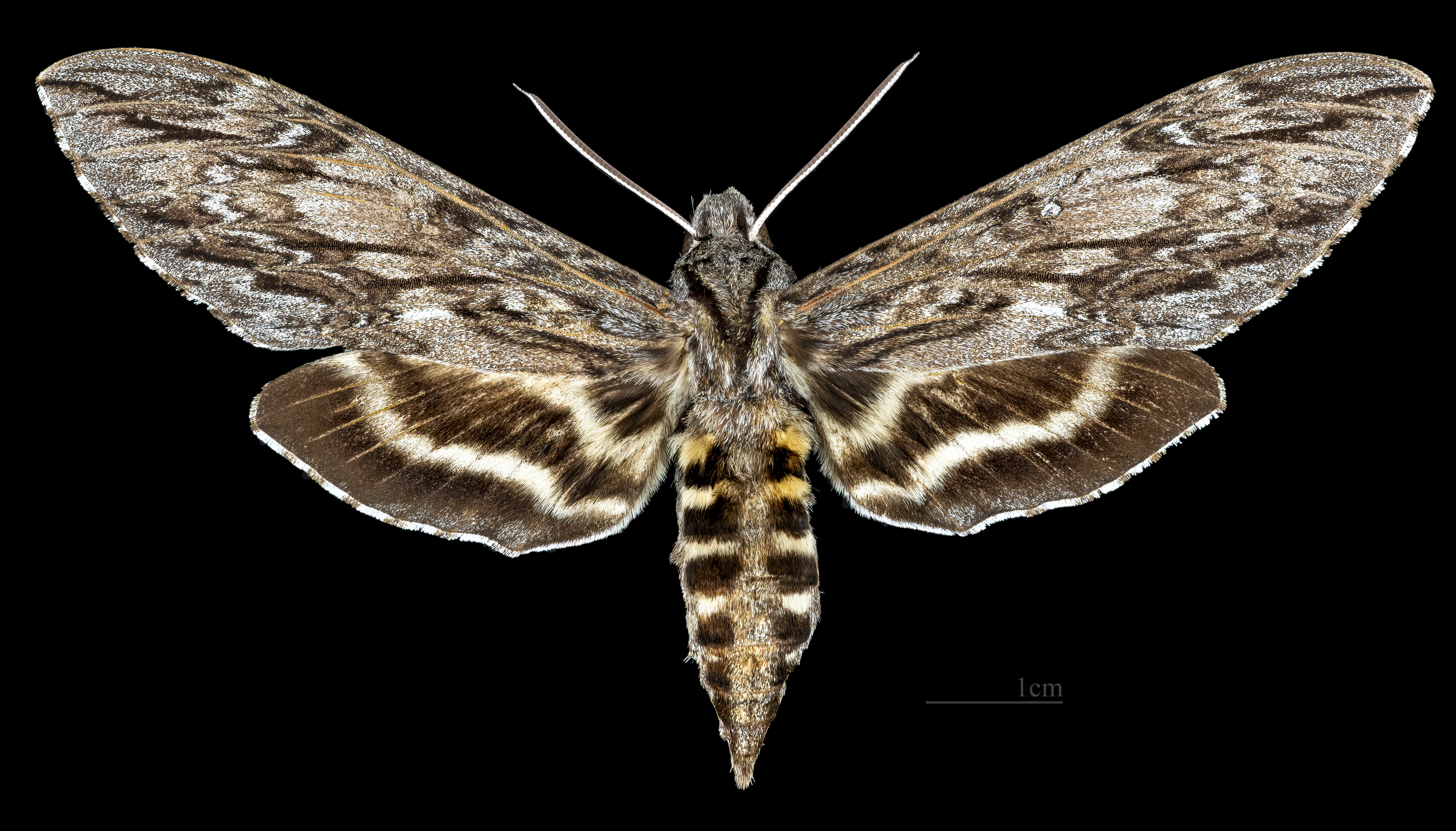
Female Dorsal side

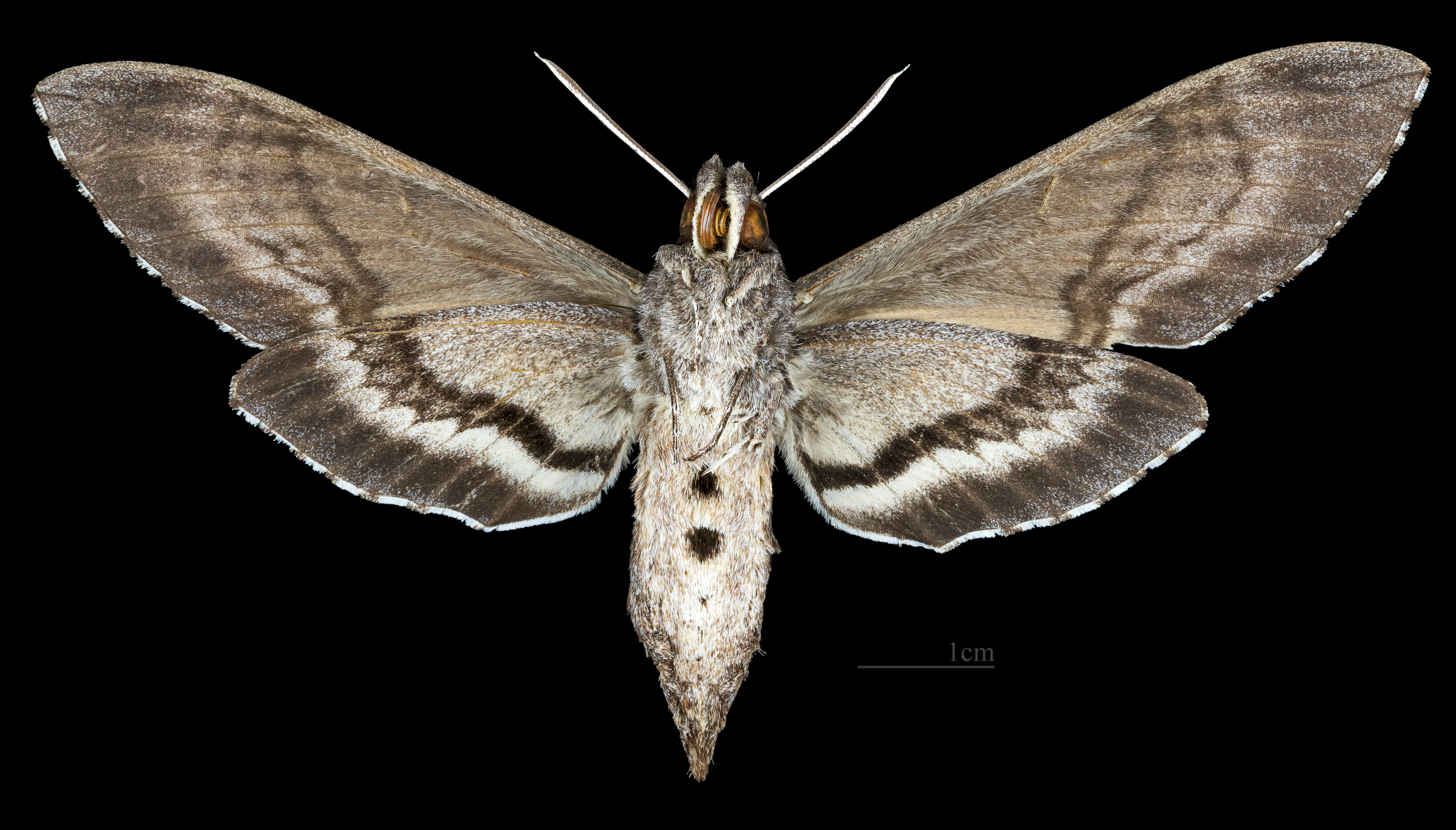
Female △ Ventral side

== Biology ==
The larvae probably feed on Lamiaceae (such as Salvia, Mentha, Monarda and Hyptis), Hydrophylloideae (such as Wigandia) and Verbenaceae species (such as Verbena and Lantana).
