= L. tricolor =

L. tricolor may refer to:

- Leptotyphlops tricolor, the three-colored blind snake, a reptile species
- Lintneria tricolor, a moth species found in Dominica
- Lyriothemis tricolor, a dragonfly species found in Bangladesh, China, India, Japan, Myanmar and Taiwan

== See also ==
- Tricolor (disambiguation)
