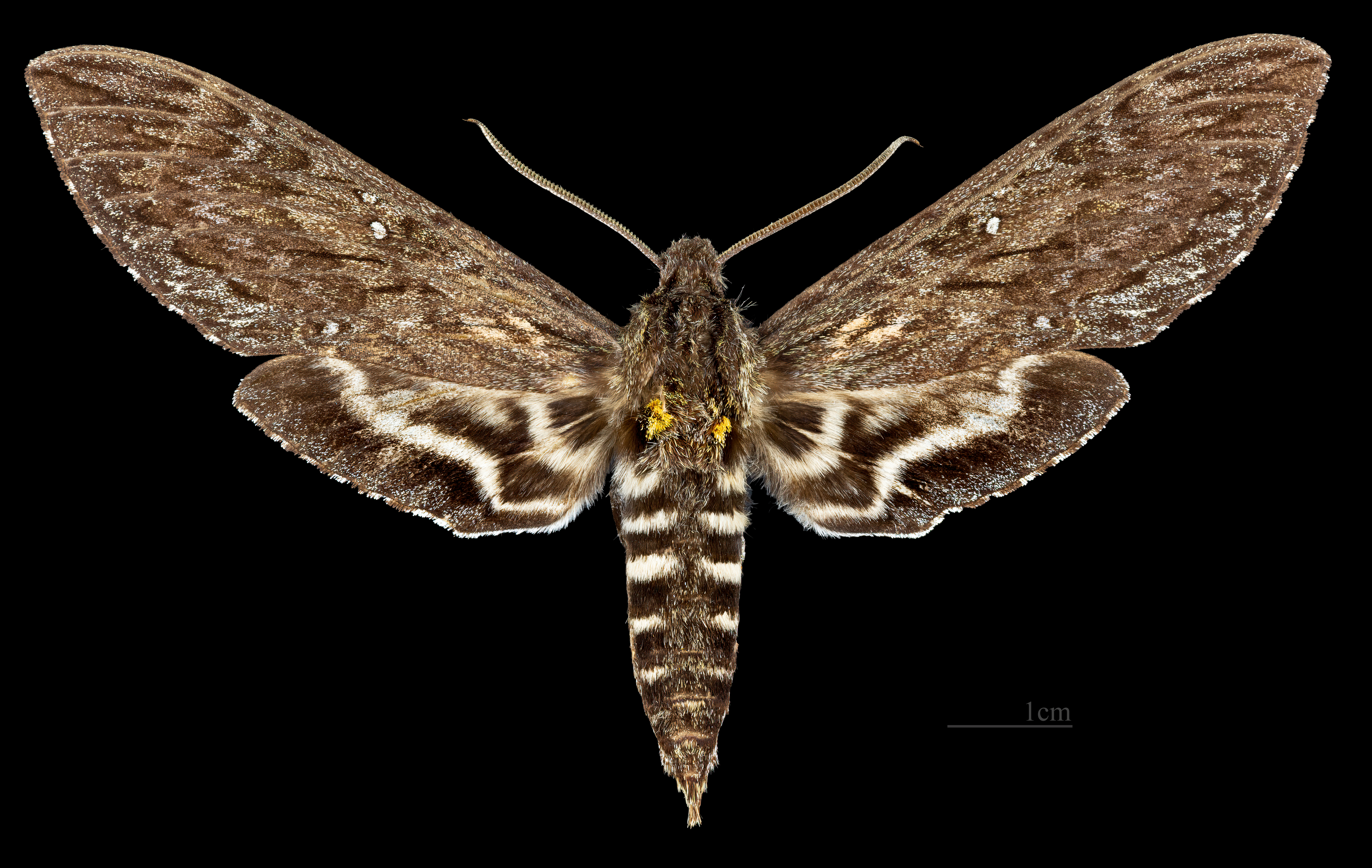
- Lintneria aurigutta ♂
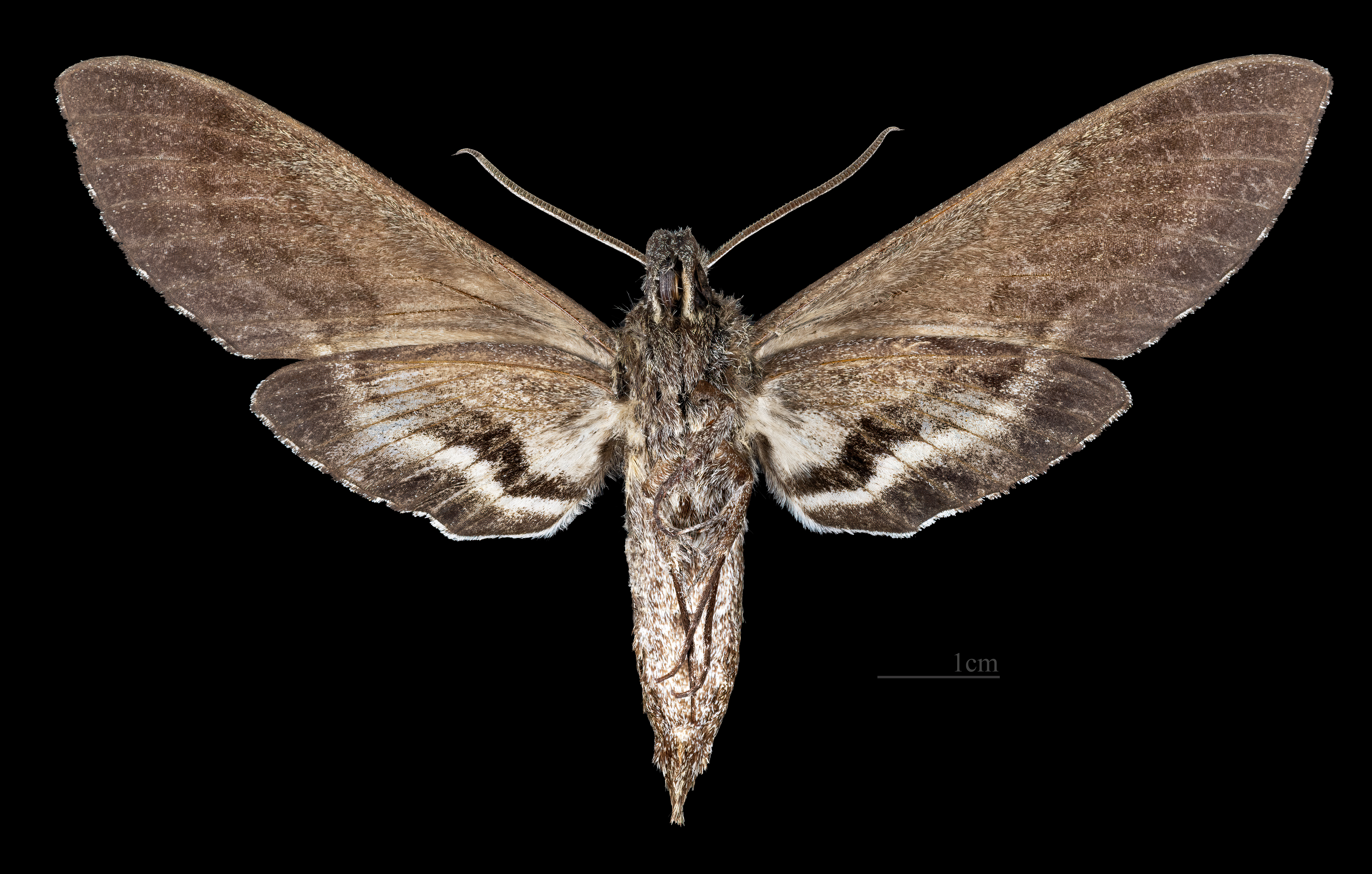
- Lintneria aurigutta♂ △

Scientific classification
- Domain: Eukaryota
- Kingdom: Animalia
- Phylum: Arthropoda
- Class: Insecta
- Order: Lepidoptera
- Family: Sphingidae
- Genus: Lintneria
- Species: L. aurigutta

Binomial name
- Lintneria aurigutta (Rothschild & Jordan, 1903)

Synonyms
- Sphinx aurigutta; Hyloicus aurigutta Rothschild & Jordan, 1903

= Lintneria aurigutta =

Species of moth

Lintneria aurigutta is a moth of the family Sphingidae. It is known from Peru, Bolivia and Argentina.

The wingspan is 52–58 mm. There are at least two generations per year with adults on wing in March and again in December.

The larvae probably feed on Lamiaceae (such as Salvia), Hydrophylloideae (such as Wigandia) and Verbenaceae species (such as Lantana).
