= Lintneria balsae =

Scientific classification
- Domain: Eukaryota
- Kingdom: Animalia
- Phylum: Arthropoda
- Class: Insecta
- Order: Lepidoptera
- Family: Sphingidae
- Genus: Lintneria
- Species: L. balsae

Binomial name
- Lintneria balsae (Schaus, 1932)

Synonyms
- Sphinx balsae; Hyloicus balsae Schaus, 1932

Species of moth

Lintneria balsae is a moth of the family Sphingidae. It is known from Mexico.
