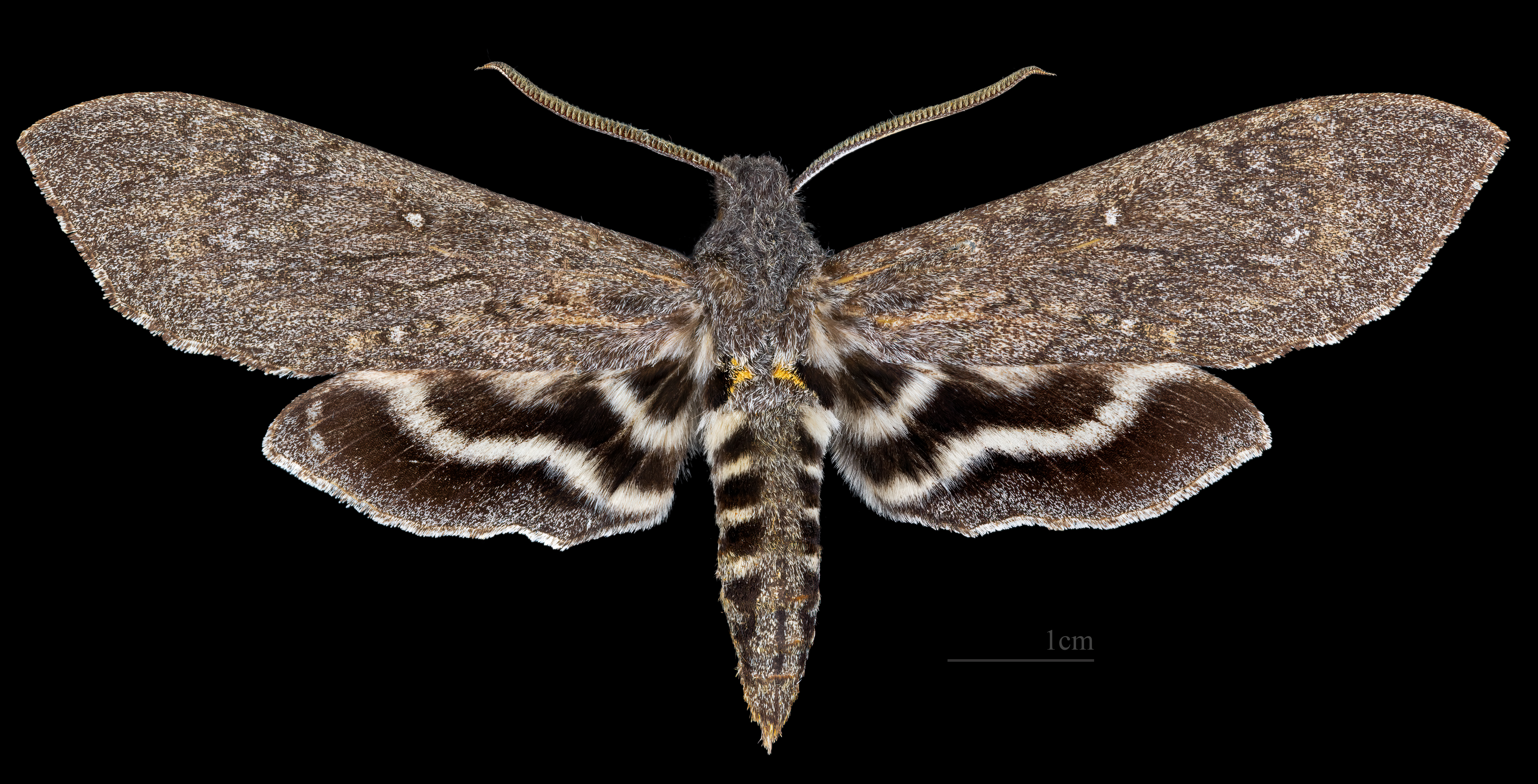
- Lintneria maura ♂
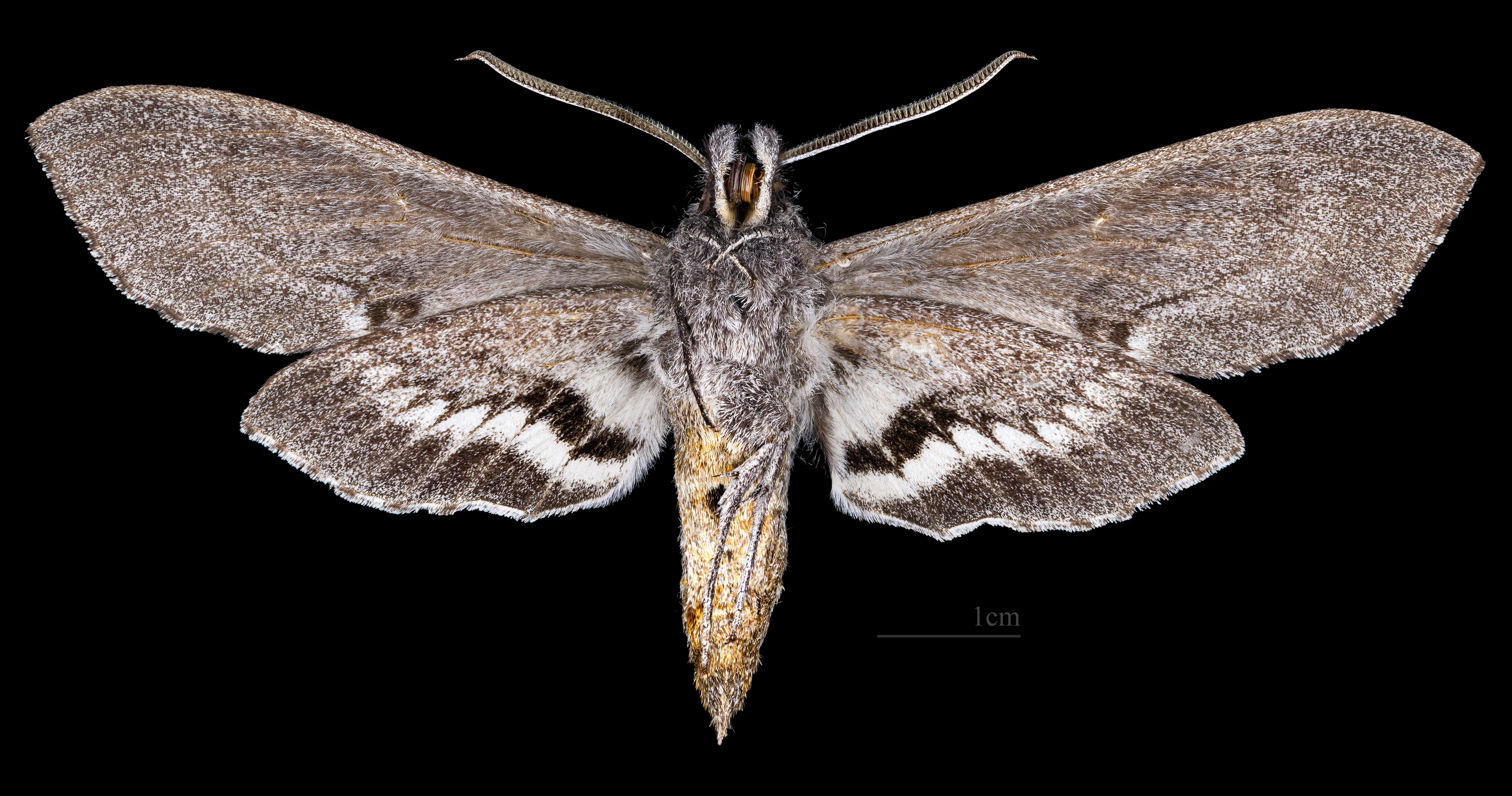
- Lintneria maura ♂ △

Scientific classification
- Domain: Eukaryota
- Kingdom: Animalia
- Phylum: Arthropoda
- Class: Insecta
- Order: Lepidoptera
- Family: Sphingidae
- Genus: Lintneria
- Species: L. maura

Binomial name
- Lintneria maura (Burmeister, 1879)

Synonyms
- Sphinx maura Burmeister, 1879

= Lintneria maura =

Species of moth

Lintneria maura is a moth of the family Sphingidae.

== Distribution ==
It is known from Argentina and Bolivia.

== Description ==
The wingspan is about 80 mm.

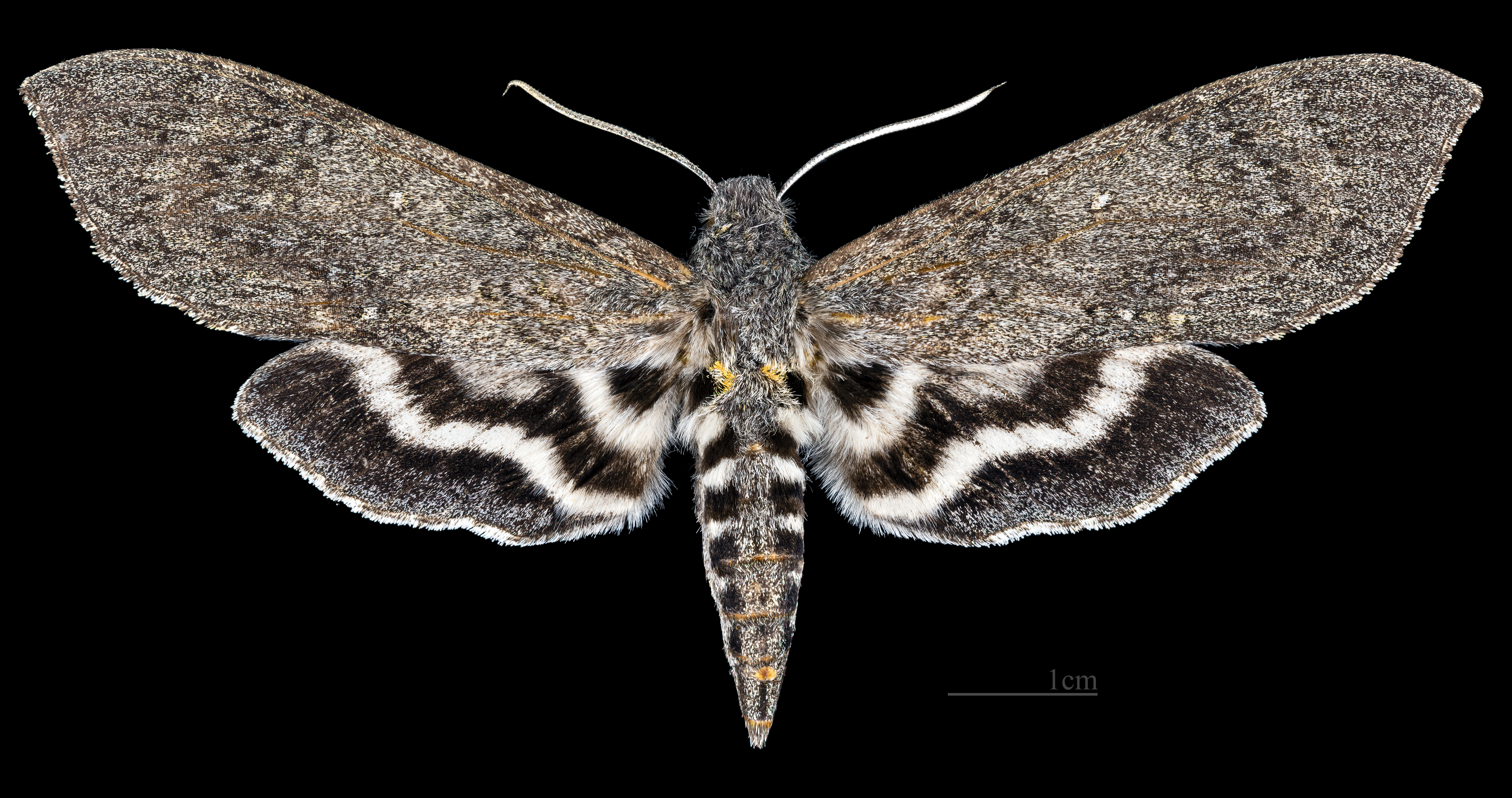
Lintneria maura ♀

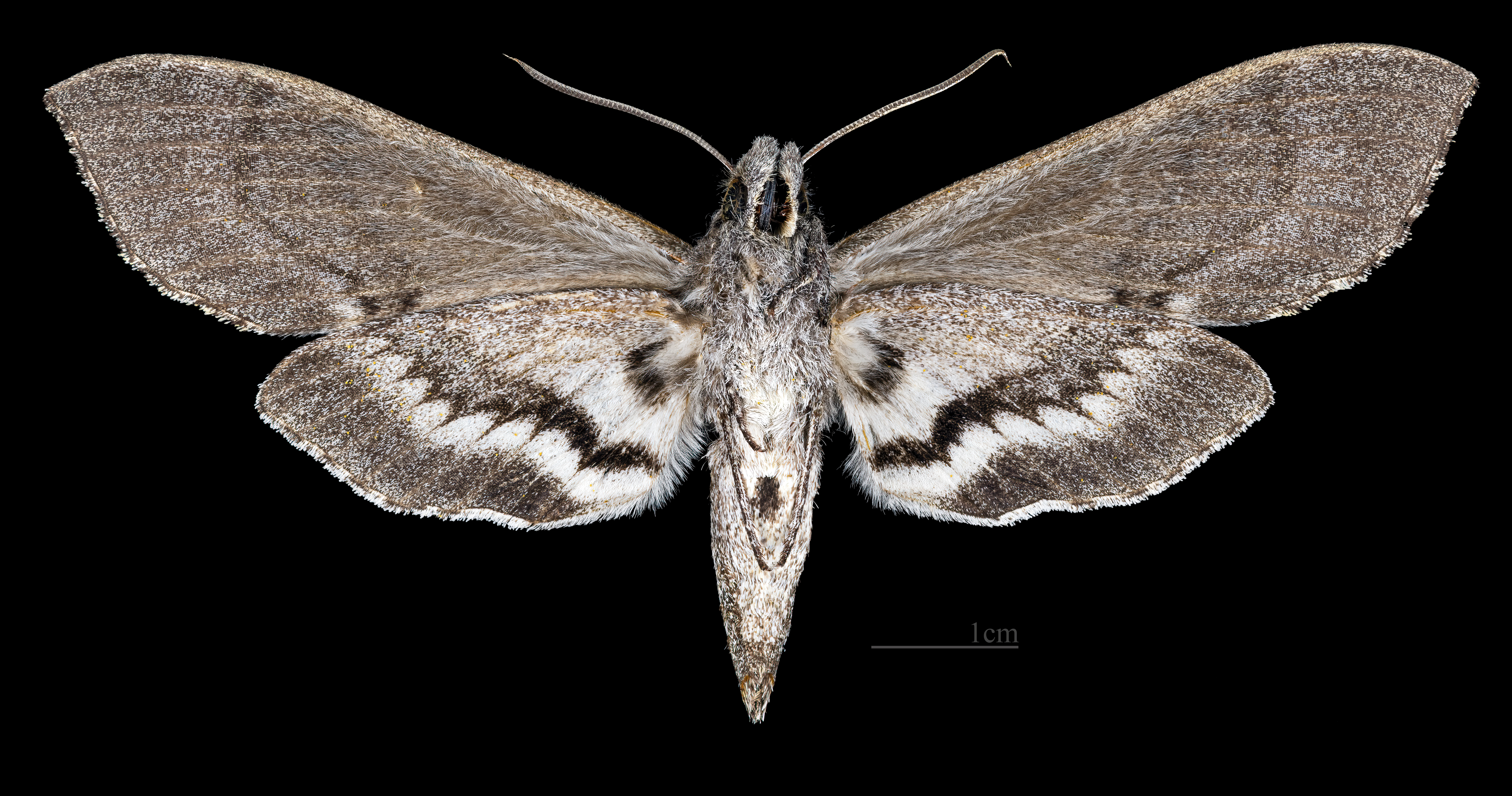
Lintneria maura ♀ △

== Biology ==
Adults have been recorded from May to October in Bolivia and from November to December in Argentina.Adults have been recorded in late January in Brazil.

The larvae probably feed on Lamiaceae (such as Salvia, Mentha, Monarda and Hyptis), Hydrophylloideae (such as Wigandia) and Verbenaceae species (such as Verbena and Lantana).
