= Lintneria smithi =

Smith's sphinx

Conservation status
- Critically Imperiled (NatureServe)

Scientific classification
- Kingdom: Animalia
- Phylum: Arthropoda
- Clade: Pancrustacea
- Class: Insecta
- Order: Lepidoptera
- Family: Sphingidae
- Genus: Lintneria
- Species: L. smithi

Binomial name
- Lintneria smithi (Cadiou, 1998)

Synonyms
- Sphinx smithi Cadiou, 1998

Species of moth

Lintneria smithi is a species of moth in the family Sphingidae, the sphinx moths and hawk moths. It is known by the common name Smith's sphinx. It is known from southern Arizona, southeastern New Mexico, and Sonora in northwestern Mexico.

This moth has a thick, elongated body and a wingspan of about 9 centimeters. The larva is mottled white and grayish brown with a purple tinge.

This moth has only been recorded at three or four locations. Little is known about its life history.
