= Lintneria pitzahuac =

Scientific classification
- Domain: Eukaryota
- Kingdom: Animalia
- Phylum: Arthropoda
- Class: Insecta
- Order: Lepidoptera
- Family: Sphingidae
- Genus: Lintneria
- Species: L. pitzahuac

Binomial name
- Lintneria pitzahuac (Mooser, 1948)

Synonyms
- Sphinx pitzahuac Mooser, 1948

Species of moth

Lintneria pitzahuac is a moth of the family Sphingidae. It is known to be from Mexico.

The larvae probably feed on Lamiaceae (such as Salvia, Mentha, Monarda and Hyptis), Hydrophylloideae (such as Wigandia) and Verbenaceae species (such as Verbena and Lantana).
