= Lintneria justiciae =

Scientific classification
- Domain: Eukaryota
- Kingdom: Animalia
- Phylum: Arthropoda
- Class: Insecta
- Order: Lepidoptera
- Family: Sphingidae
- Genus: Lintneria
- Species: L. justiciae

Binomial name
- Lintneria justiciae (Walker, 1856)

Synonyms
- Sphinx justiciae Walker, 1856; Sphinx anteros Ménétriés, 1857

Species of moth

Lintneria justiciae is a moth of the family Sphingidae. It is known from south-eastern Brazil, eastern Argentina and Uruguay.

Adults have been recorded in late January in Brazil.

The larvae have been recorded feeding on Justicia, Petunia and Hyptis sidifolia.
