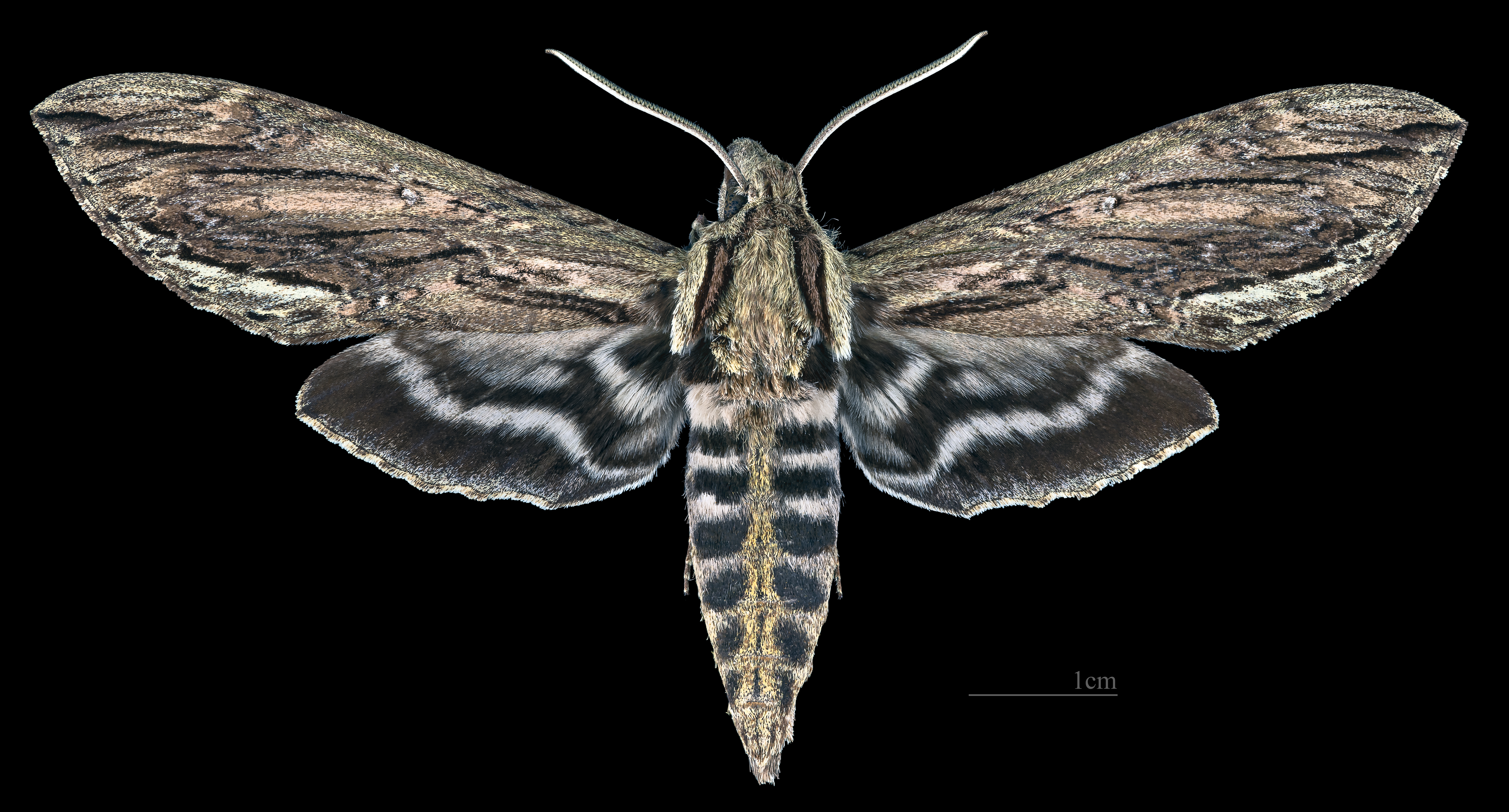
- Lintneria merops

Scientific classification
- Domain: Eukaryota
- Kingdom: Animalia
- Phylum: Arthropoda
- Class: Insecta
- Order: Lepidoptera
- Family: Sphingidae
- Tribe: Sphingini
- Genus: Lintneria; Butler, 1876

Species
- See text.

= Lintneria =

Genus of moths

Lintneria is a genus of moths in the family Sphingidae, containing the following species:

- Lintneria arthuri (Rothschild, 1897)
- Lintneria aurigutta (Rothschild & Jordan, 1903)
- Lintneria balsae (Schaus, 1932)
- Lintneria biolleyi (Schaus, 1912)
- Lintneria eremitoides (Strecker 1874)
- Lintneria eremitus (Hübner, 1823)
- Lintneria geminus (Rothschild & Jordan, 1903)
- Lintneria istar (Rothschild & Jordan 1903)
- Lintneria justiciae (Walker 1856)
- Lintneria lugens (Walker 1856)
- Lintneria maura (Burmeister 1879)
- Lintneria merops (Boisduval 1870)
- Lintneria phalerata (Kernbach 1955)
- Lintneria pitzahuac (Mooser 1948)
- Lintneria porioni (Cadiou 1995)
- Lintneria praelongus (Rothschild & Jordan 1903)
- Lintneria pseudostigmatica (Gehlen 1928)
- Lintneria separatus (Neumoegen 1885)
- Lintneria smithi (Cadiou 1998)
- Lintneria tricolor (Clark 1923)
- Lintneria xantus (Cary 1963)
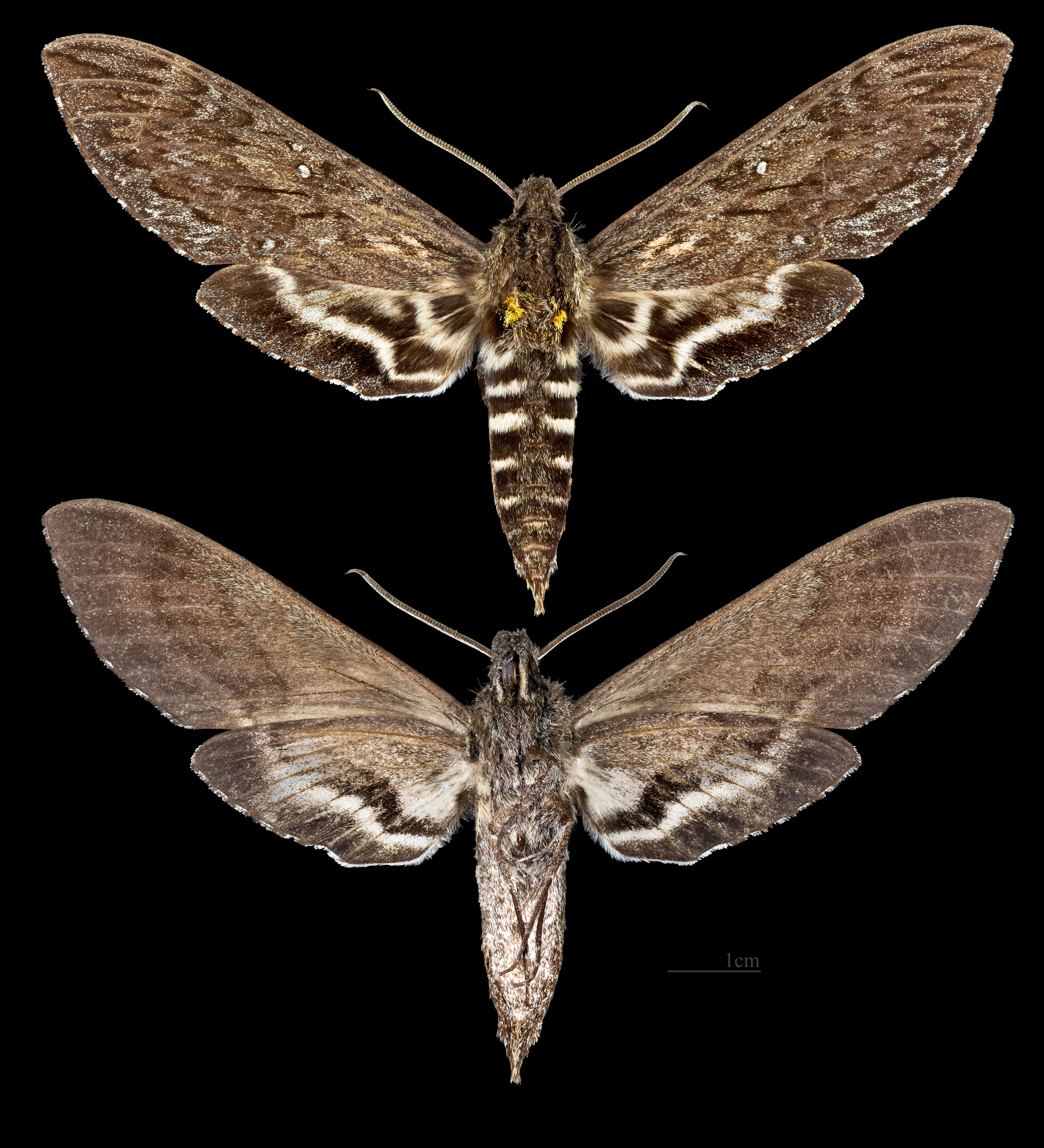
Lintneria aurigutta

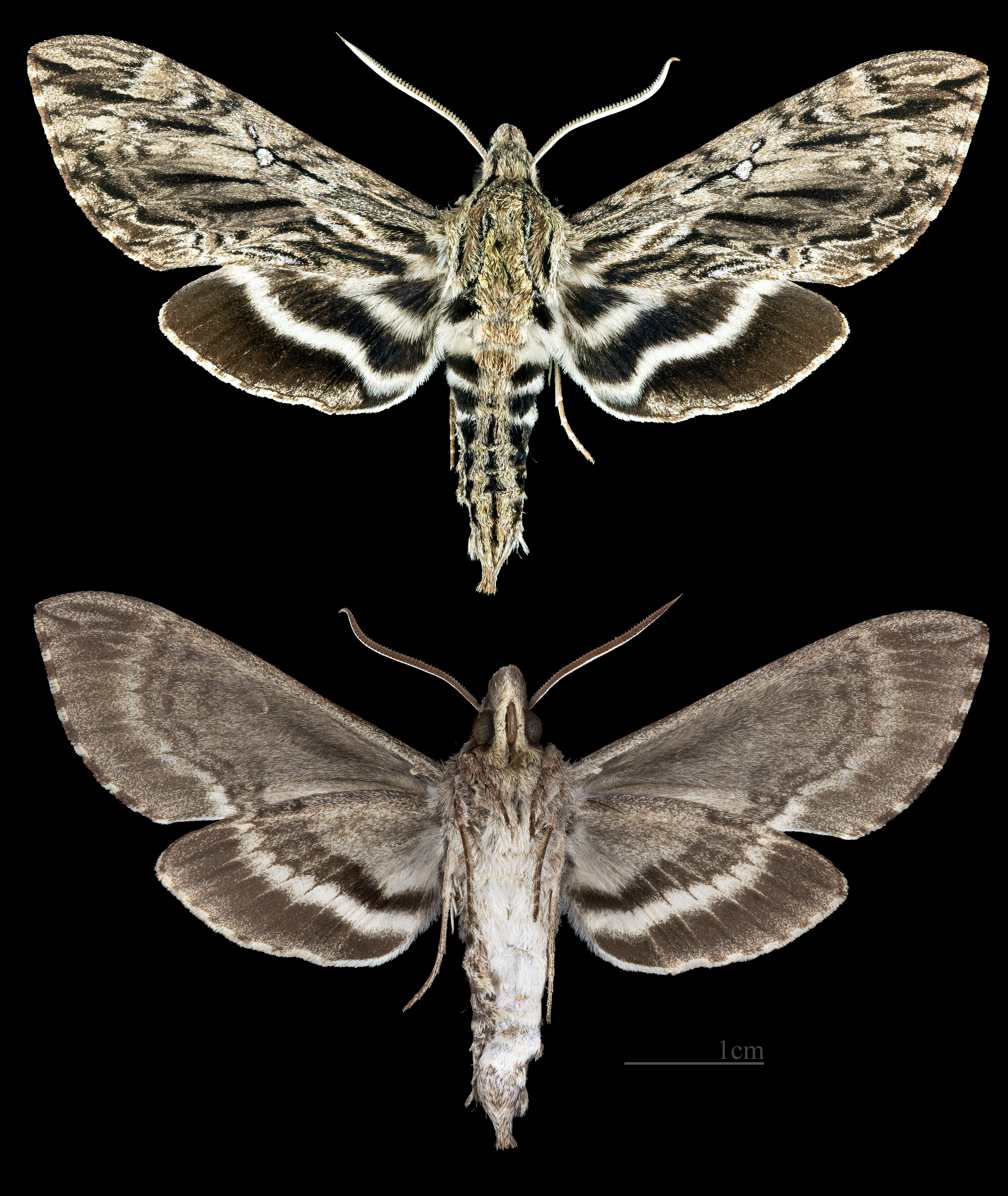
Lintneria eremitus

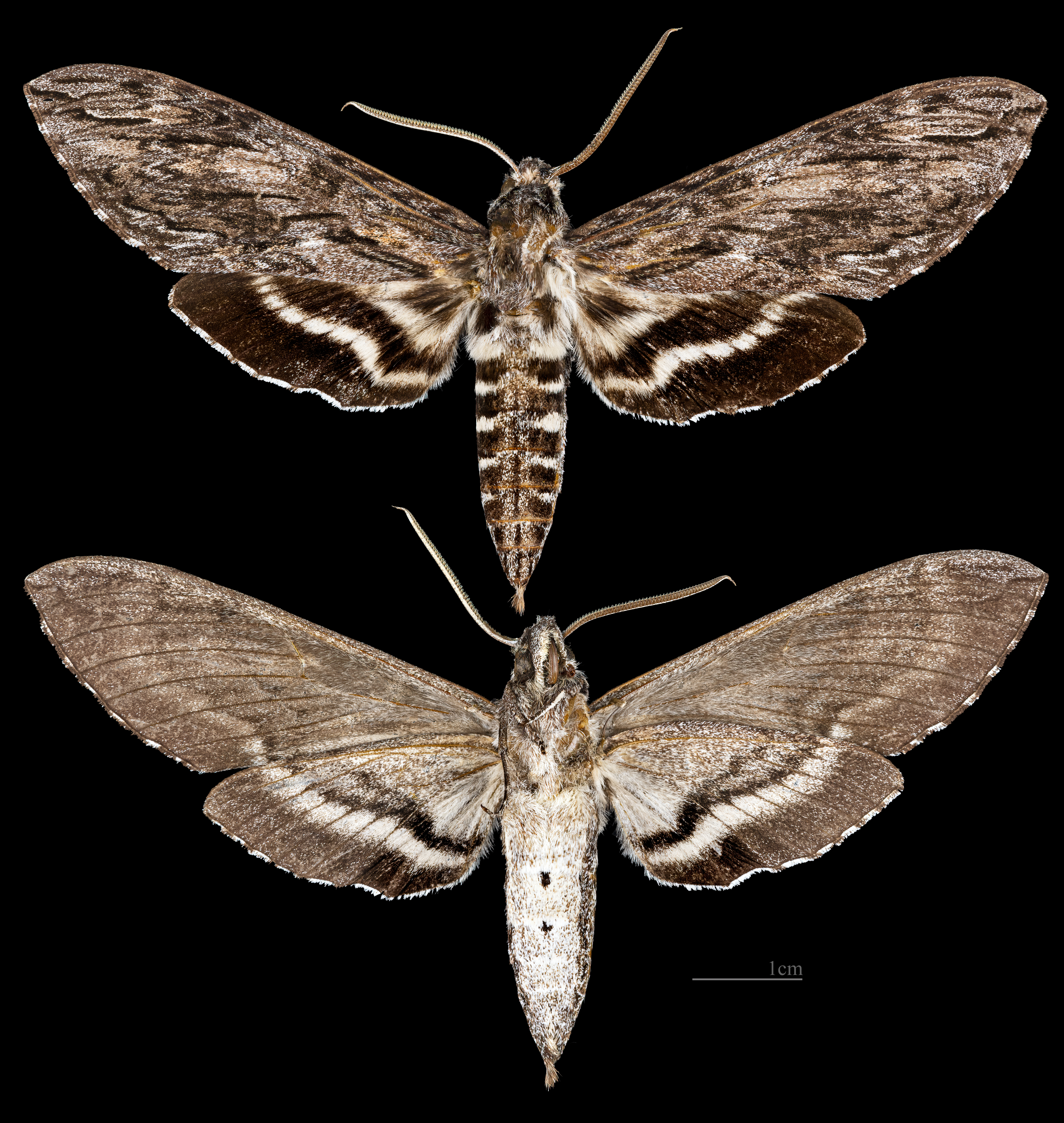
Lintneria lugens

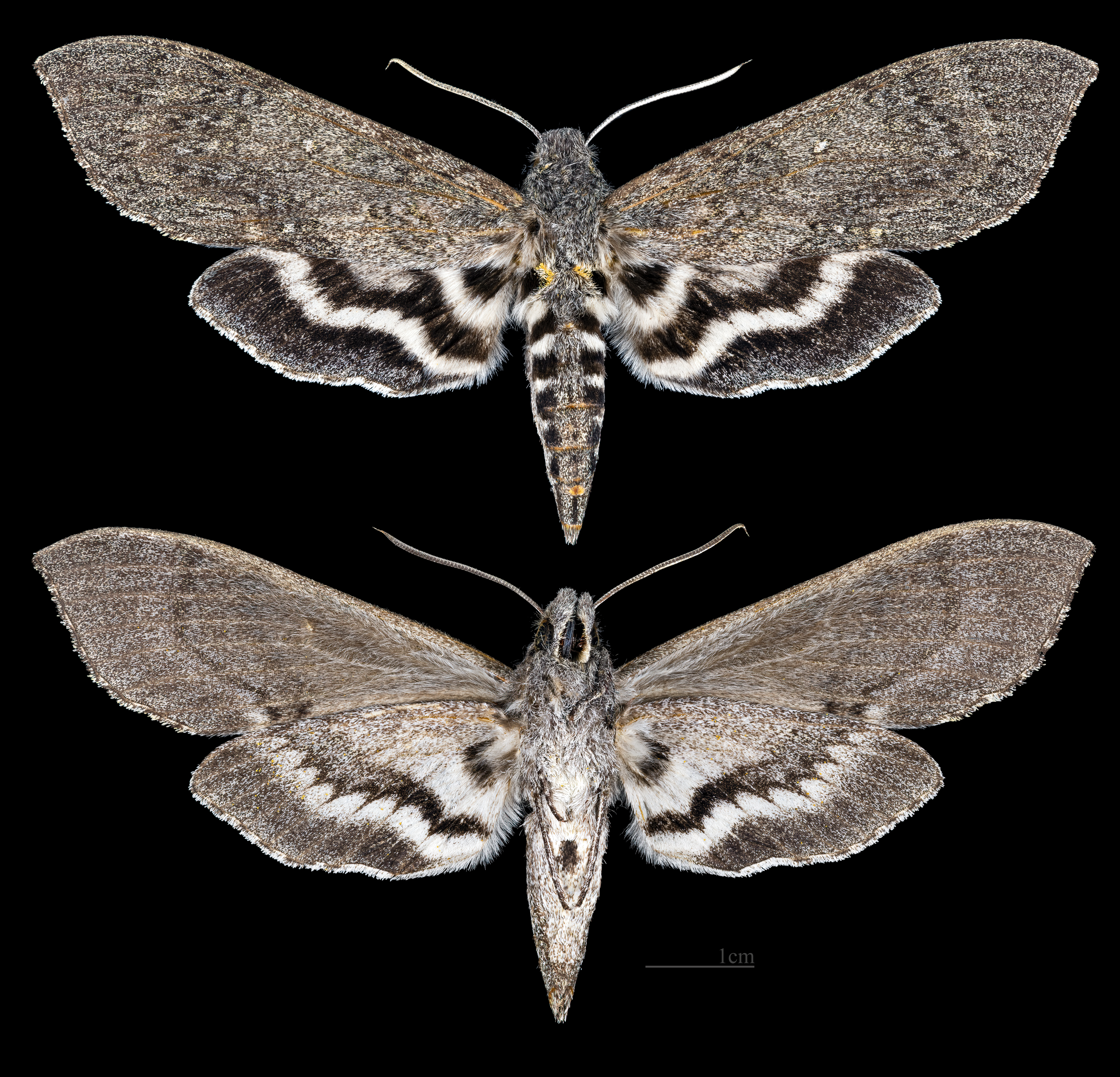
Lintneria maura

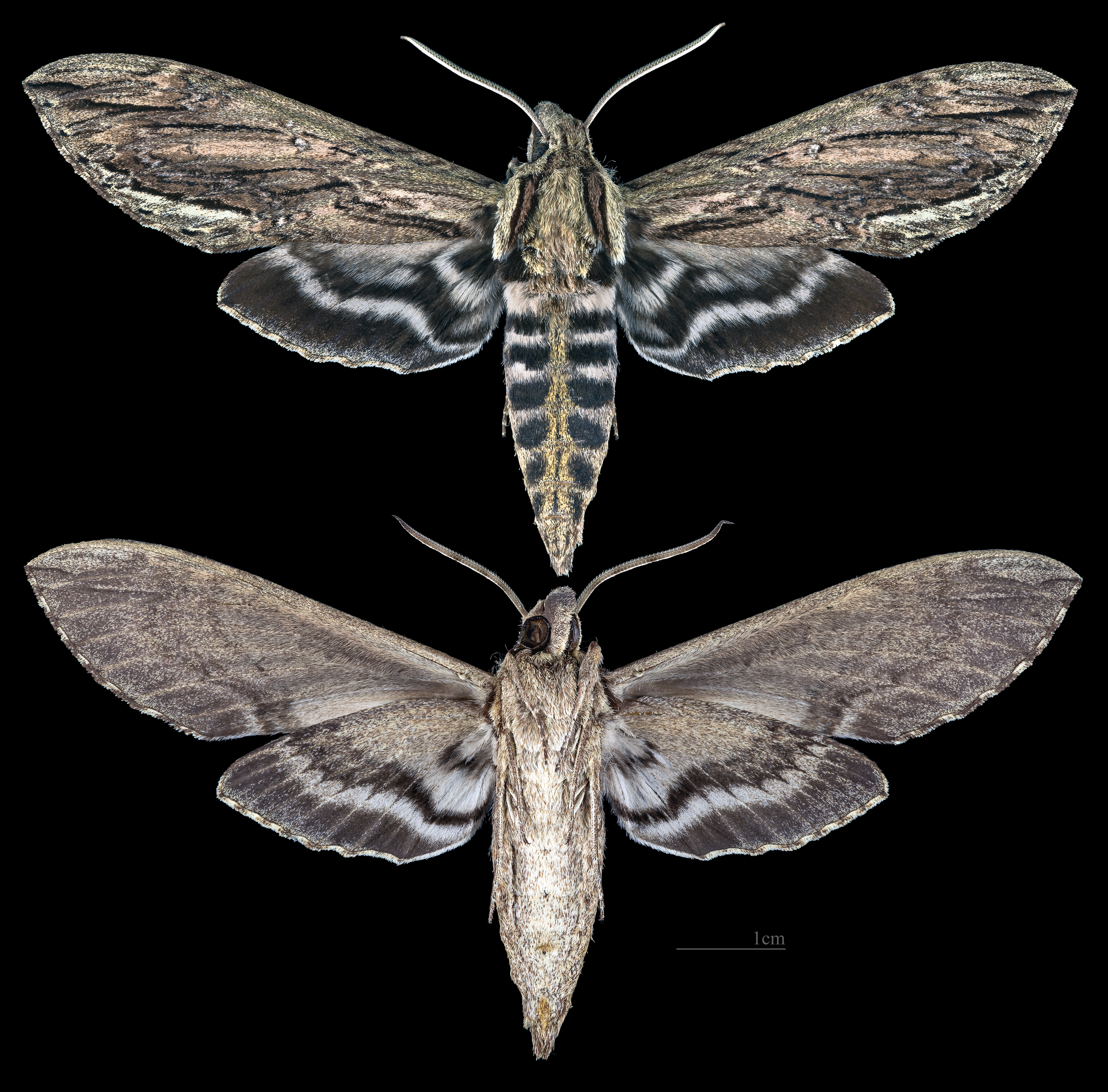
Lintneria merops

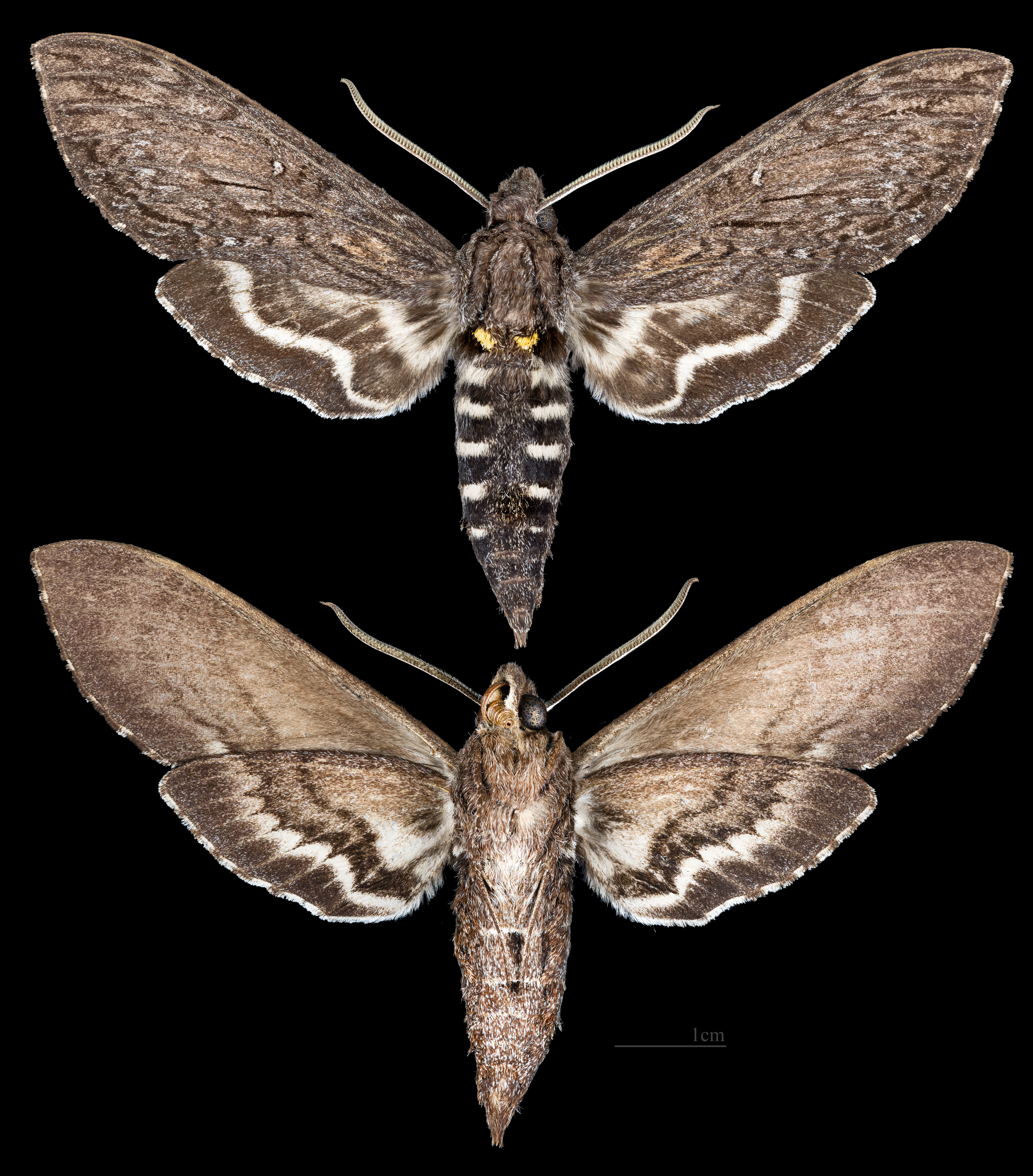
Lintneria phalerata

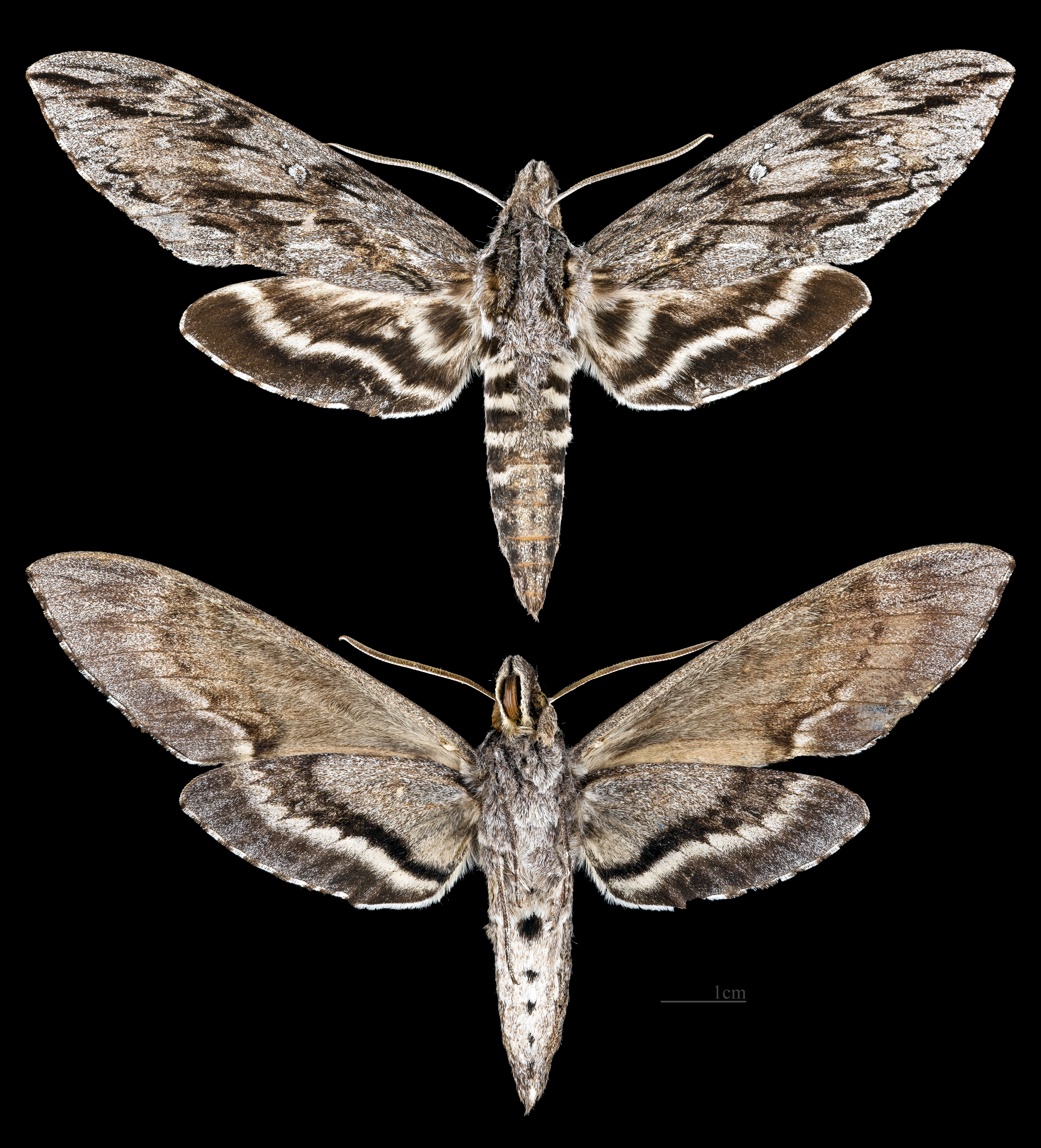
Lintneria praelongus

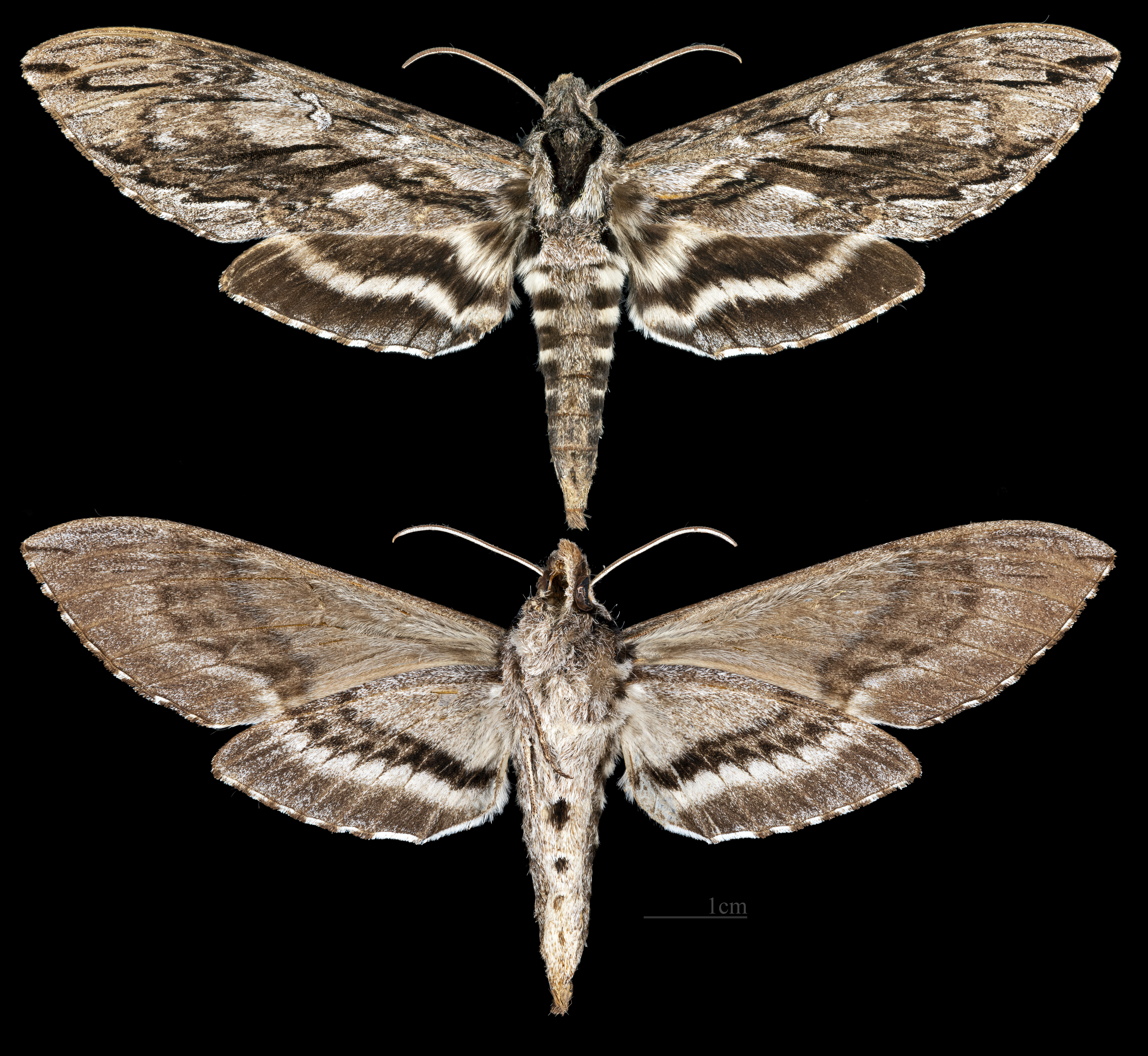
Lintneria separatus
