= Lintneria arthuri =

Scientific classification
- Kingdom: Animalia
- Phylum: Arthropoda
- Clade: Pancrustacea
- Class: Insecta
- Order: Lepidoptera
- Family: Sphingidae
- Genus: Lintneria
- Species: L. arthuri

Binomial name
- Lintneria arthuri (Rothschild, 1897)

Synonyms
- Sphinx arthuri Rothschild, 1897

Species of moth

Lintneria arthuri is a moth of the family Sphingidae. It is known from Bolivia. The wingspan is about 114 mm. Adults are on wing in November and December. The larvae probably feed on Lamiaceae (such as Salvia), Hydrophylloideae (such as Wigandia) and Verbenaceae species (such as Lantana).
