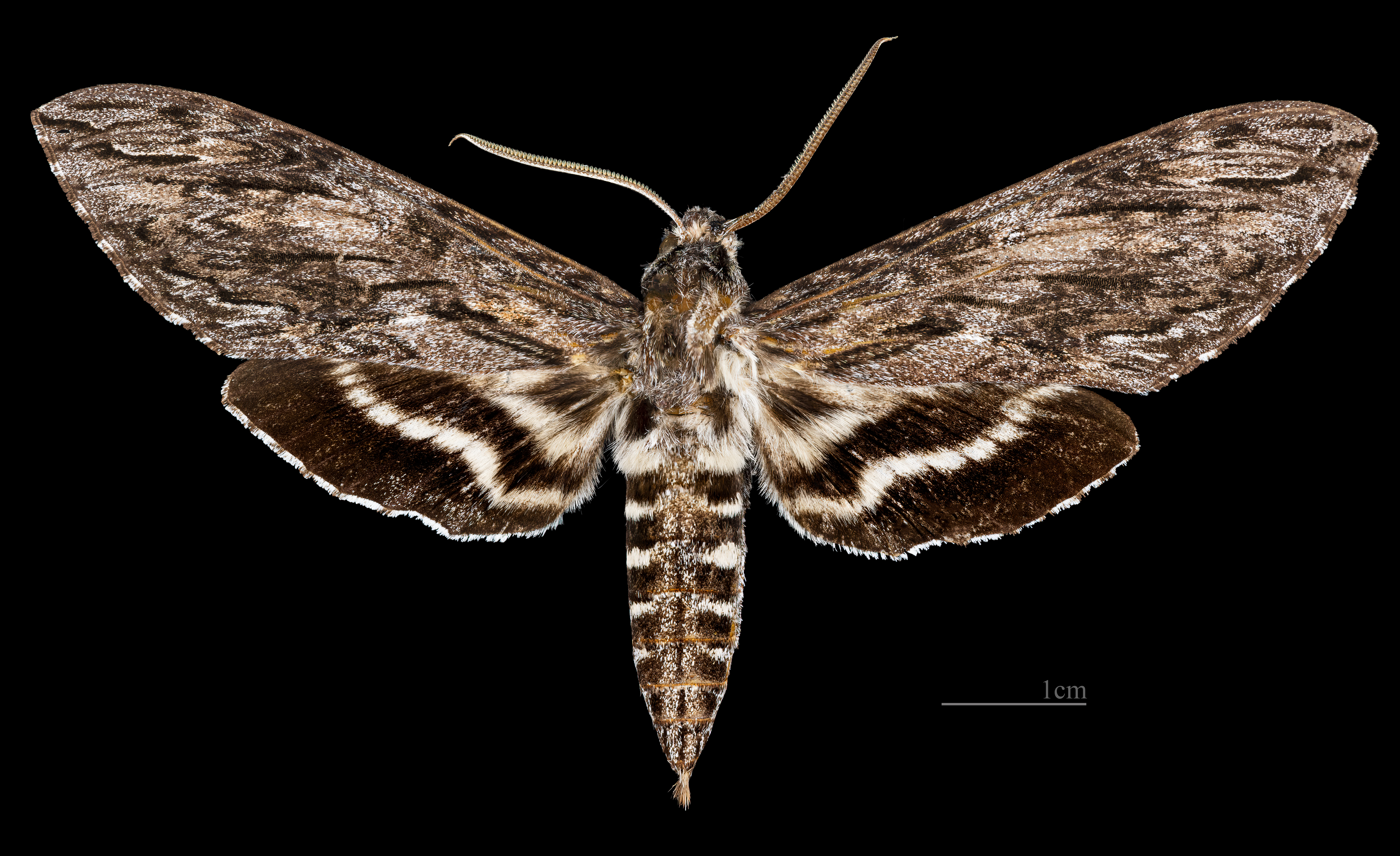
- Lintneria lugens ♂
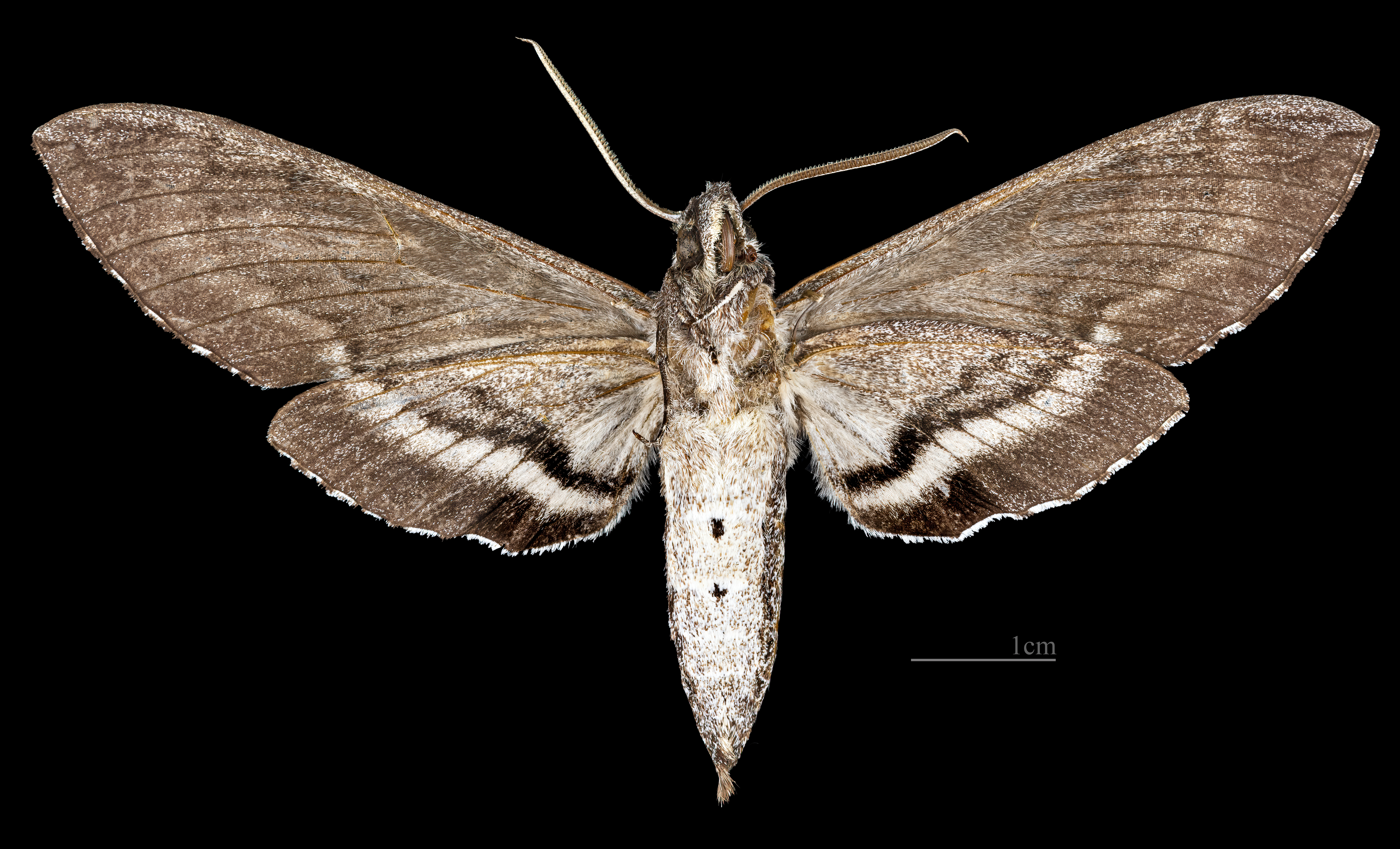
- Lintneria lugens ♂ △

Scientific classification
- Domain: Eukaryota
- Kingdom: Animalia
- Phylum: Arthropoda
- Class: Insecta
- Order: Lepidoptera
- Family: Sphingidae
- Genus: Lintneria
- Species: L. lugens

Binomial name
- Lintneria lugens (Walker, 1856)

Synonyms
- Sphinx lugens Walker, 1856; Sphinx andromedae Boisduval, 1870

= Lintneria lugens =

Species of moth

Lintneria lugens is a moth of the family Sphingidae.

== Distribution ==
It is known from Mexico, Honduras and Nicaragua.

== Description ==
It is similar to Lintneria eremitus, but larger. There are small black spots on the pale abdomen underside. The forewing upperside is blackish grey and there are two narrow, faint median bands on the forewing underside.

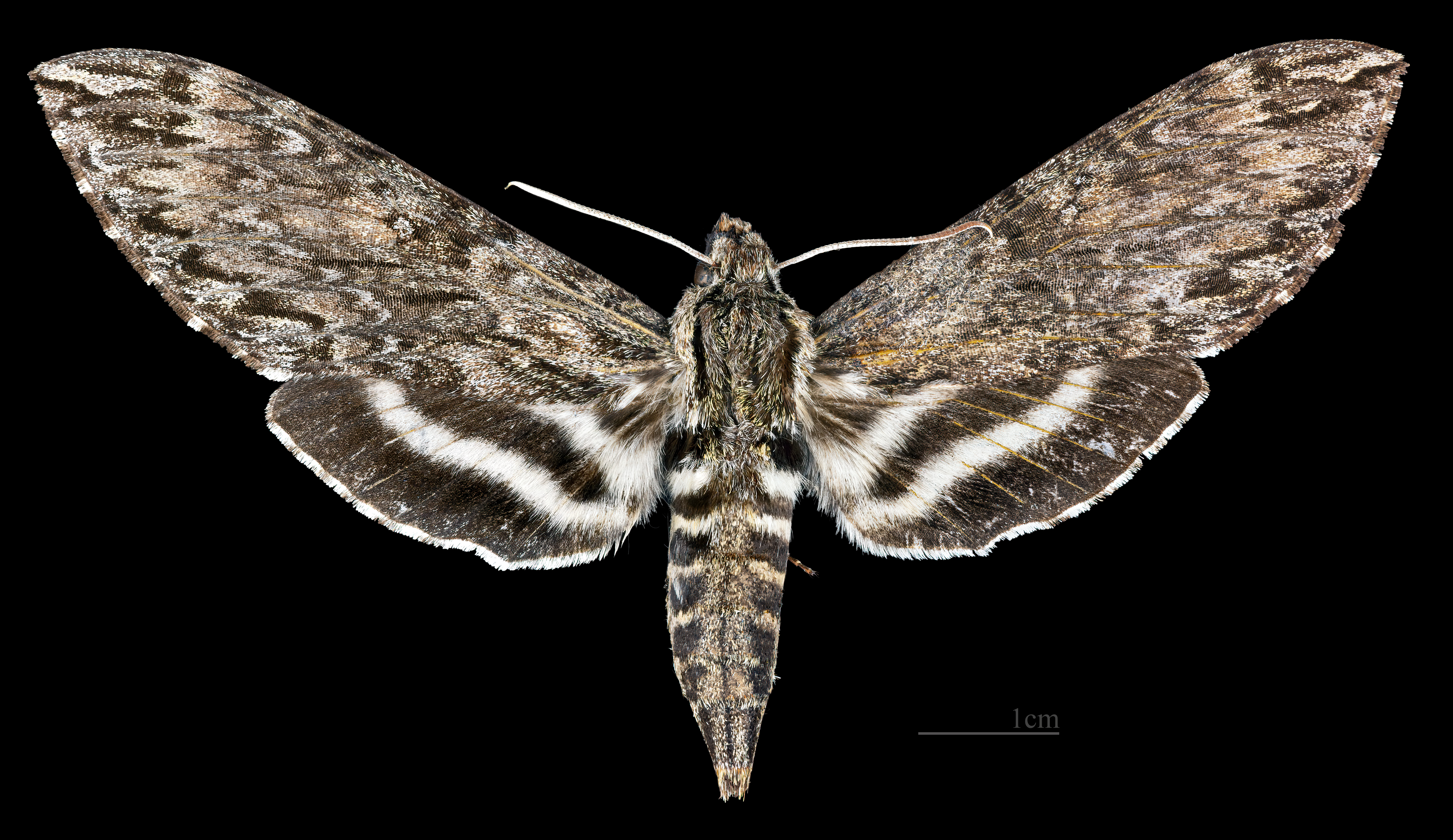
Lintneria lugens ♀

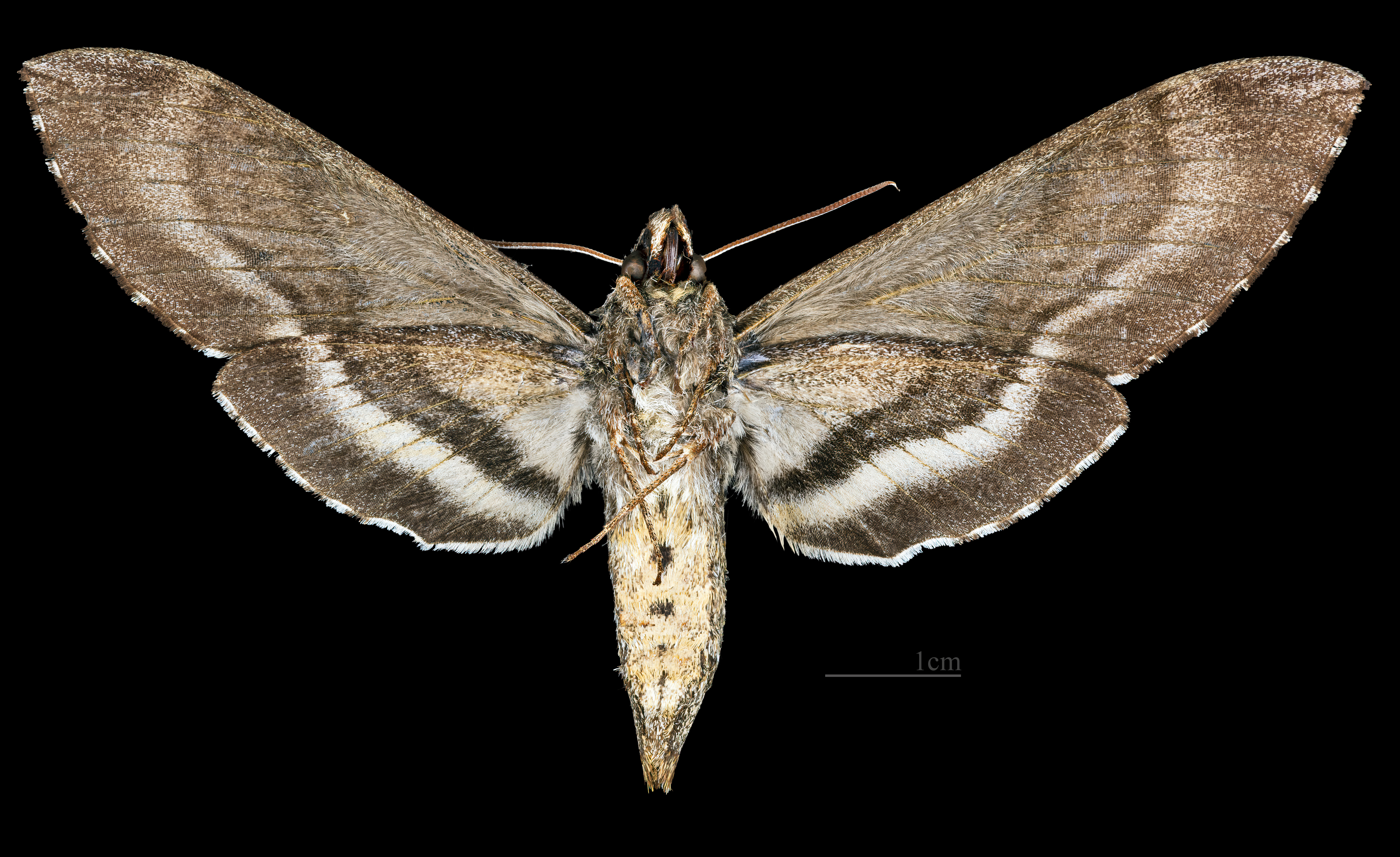
Lintneria lugens ♀ △

== Biology ==
There is one generation per year with adults on wing from July to September.

The larvae feed on Wigandia urens.
