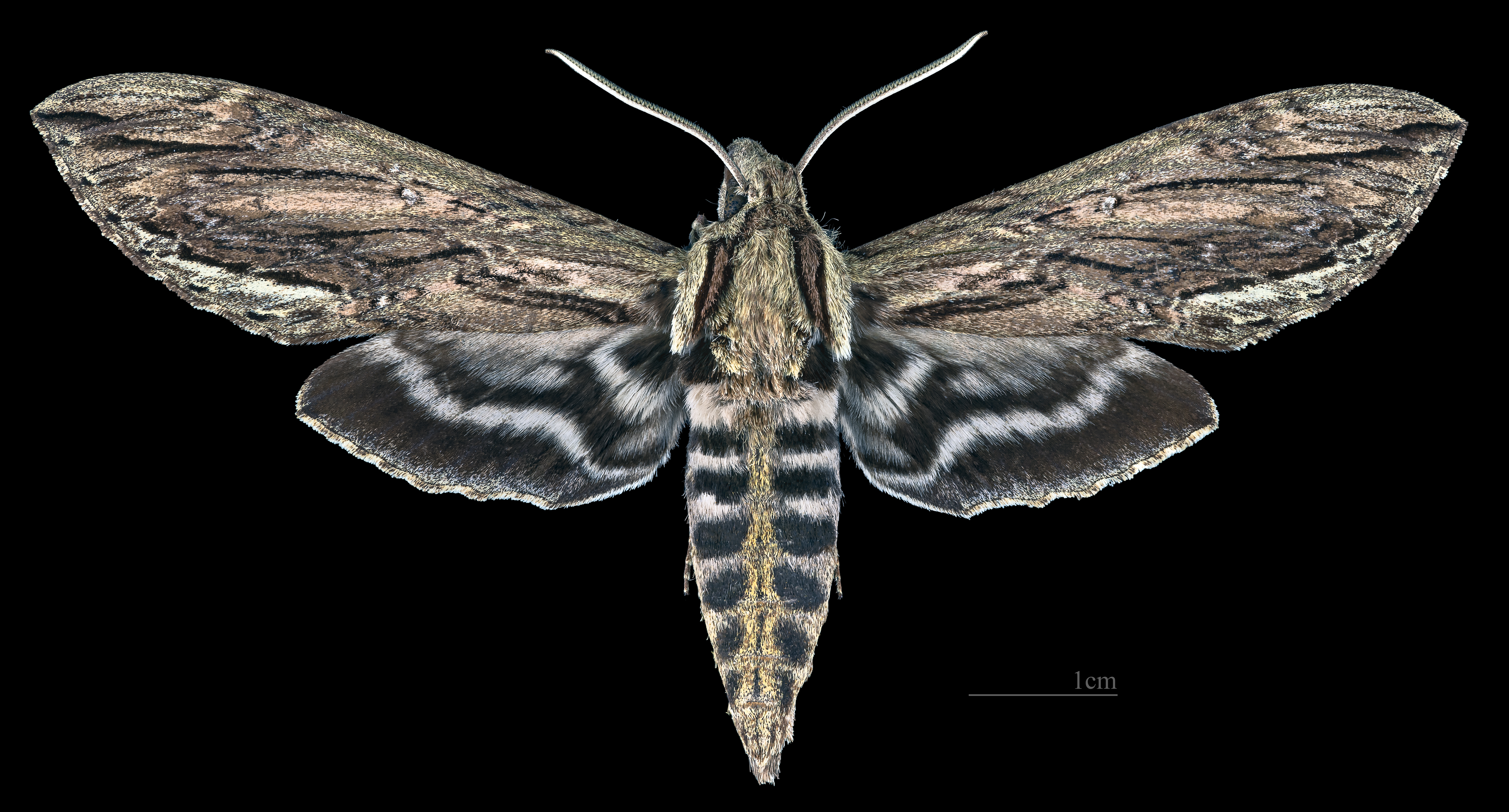
- Male dorsal
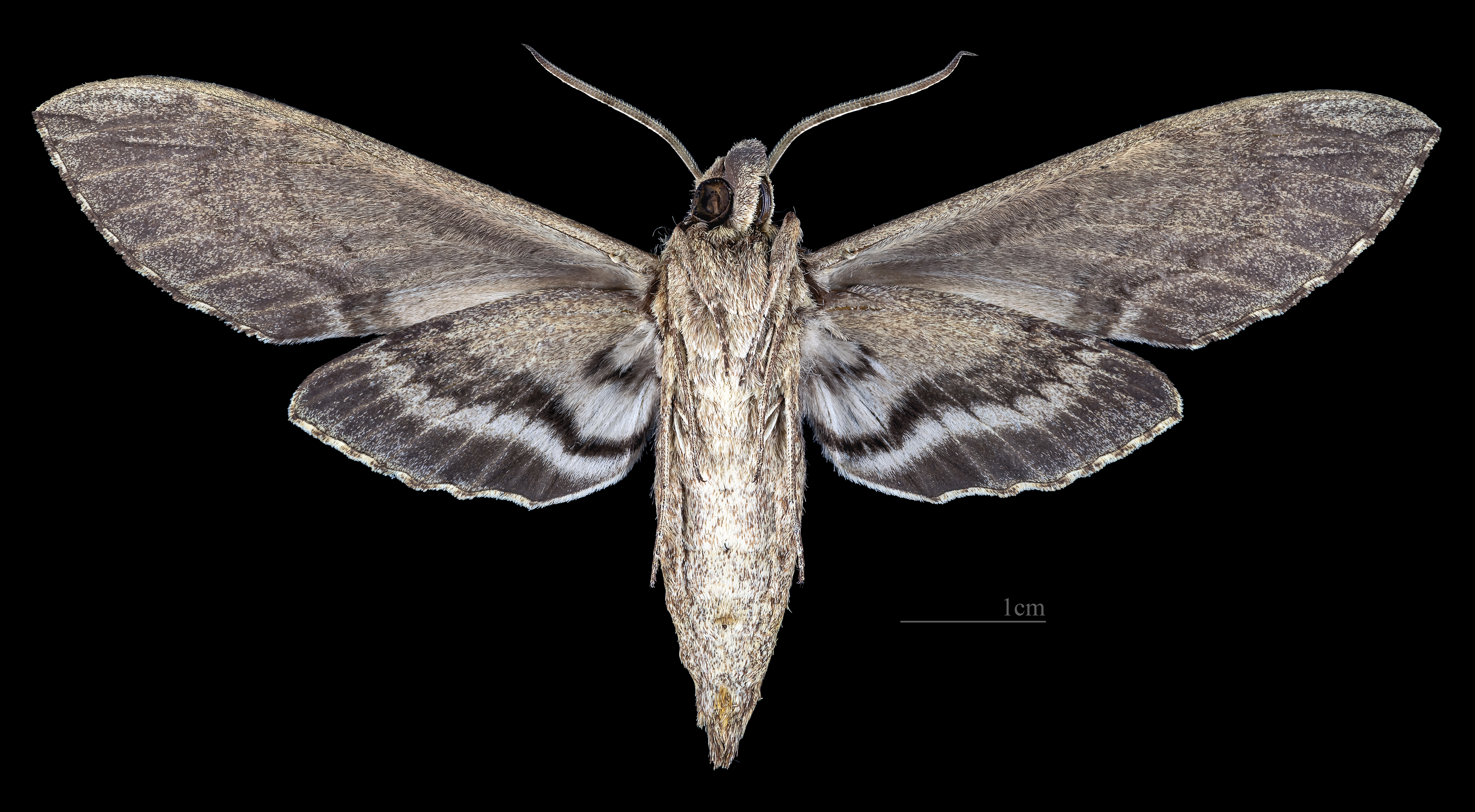
- Male ventral

Scientific classification
- Domain: Eukaryota
- Kingdom: Animalia
- Phylum: Arthropoda
- Class: Insecta
- Order: Lepidoptera
- Family: Sphingidae
- Genus: Lintneria
- Species: L. merops

Binomial name
- Lintneria merops (Boisduval, 1870)

Synonyms
- Sphinx merops Boisduval, 1870; Hyloicus merops judsoni Schaus, 1932; Hyloicus merops monjena Schaus, 1932

= Lintneria merops =

Species of moth

Lintneria merops is a moth of the family Sphingidae.

== Distribution ==
It is found from western South America, including Venezuela, to Mexico, Belize, Guatemala, Nicaragua, Honduras and Costa Rica.

== Description ==
The wingspan is 103–122 mm.

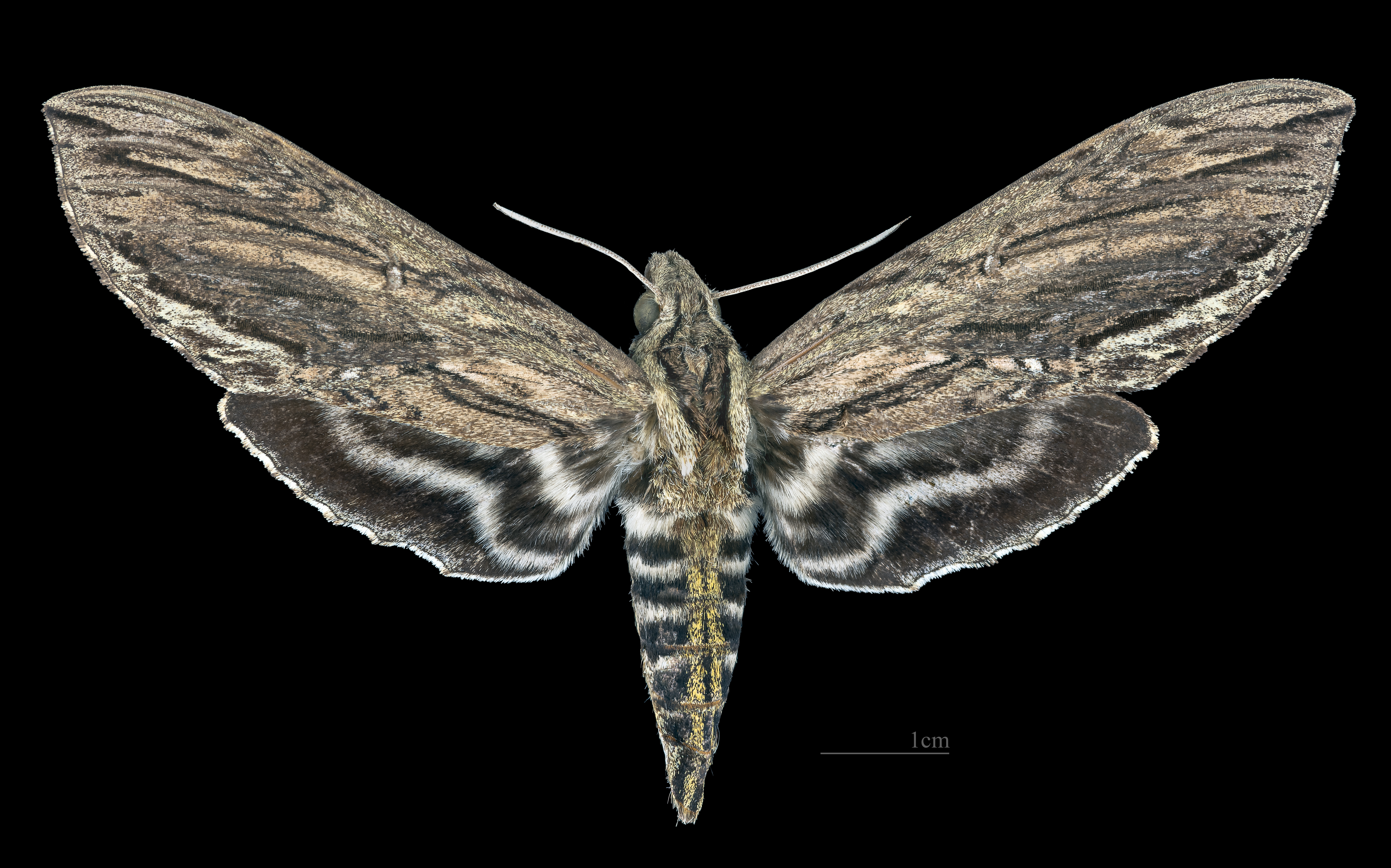
Lintneria merops ♀

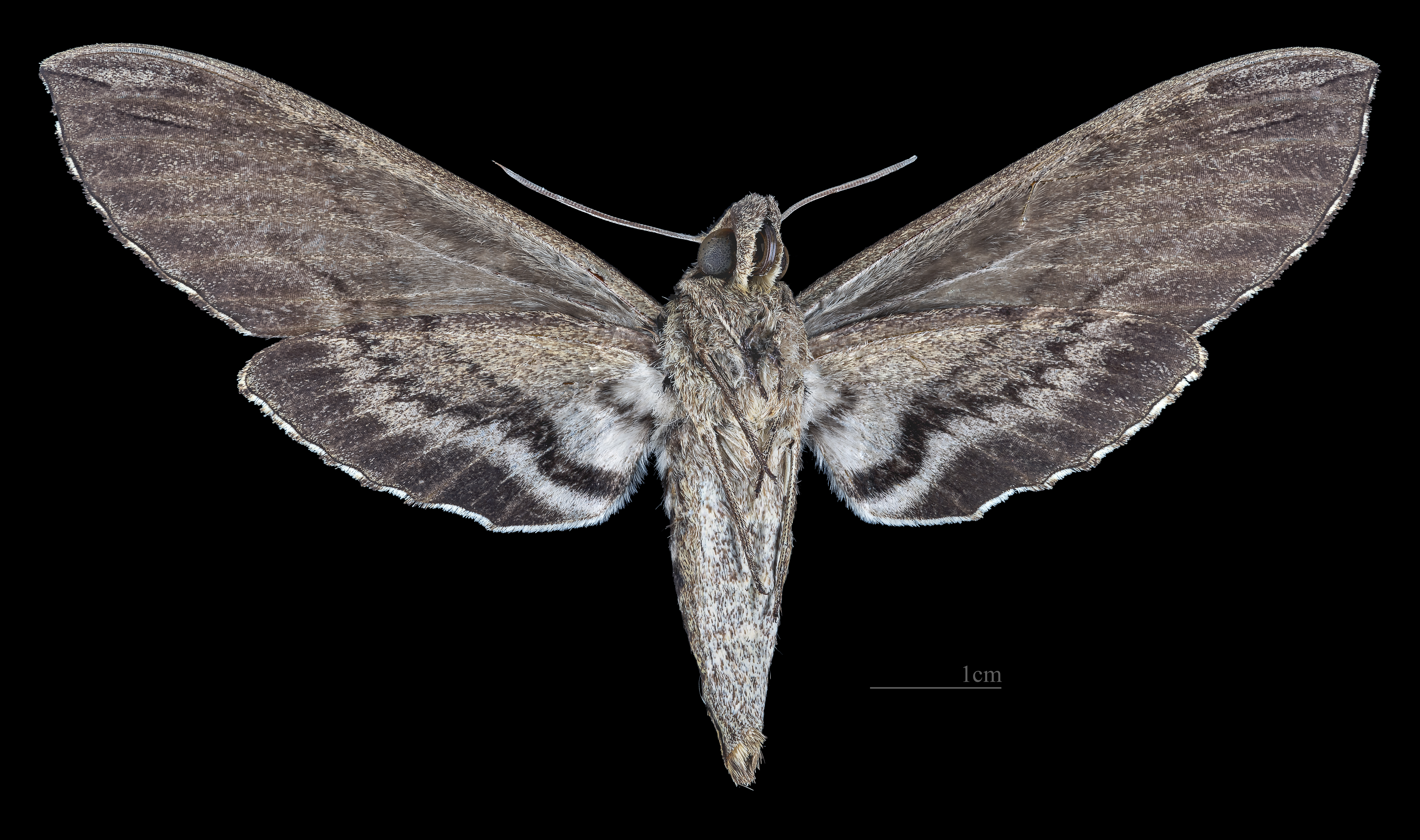
Lintneria merops ♀ △

== Biology ==
Adults have been recorded from April to January in Costa Rica.

The larvae feed on Lantana camara and probably other Verbenaceae species.
