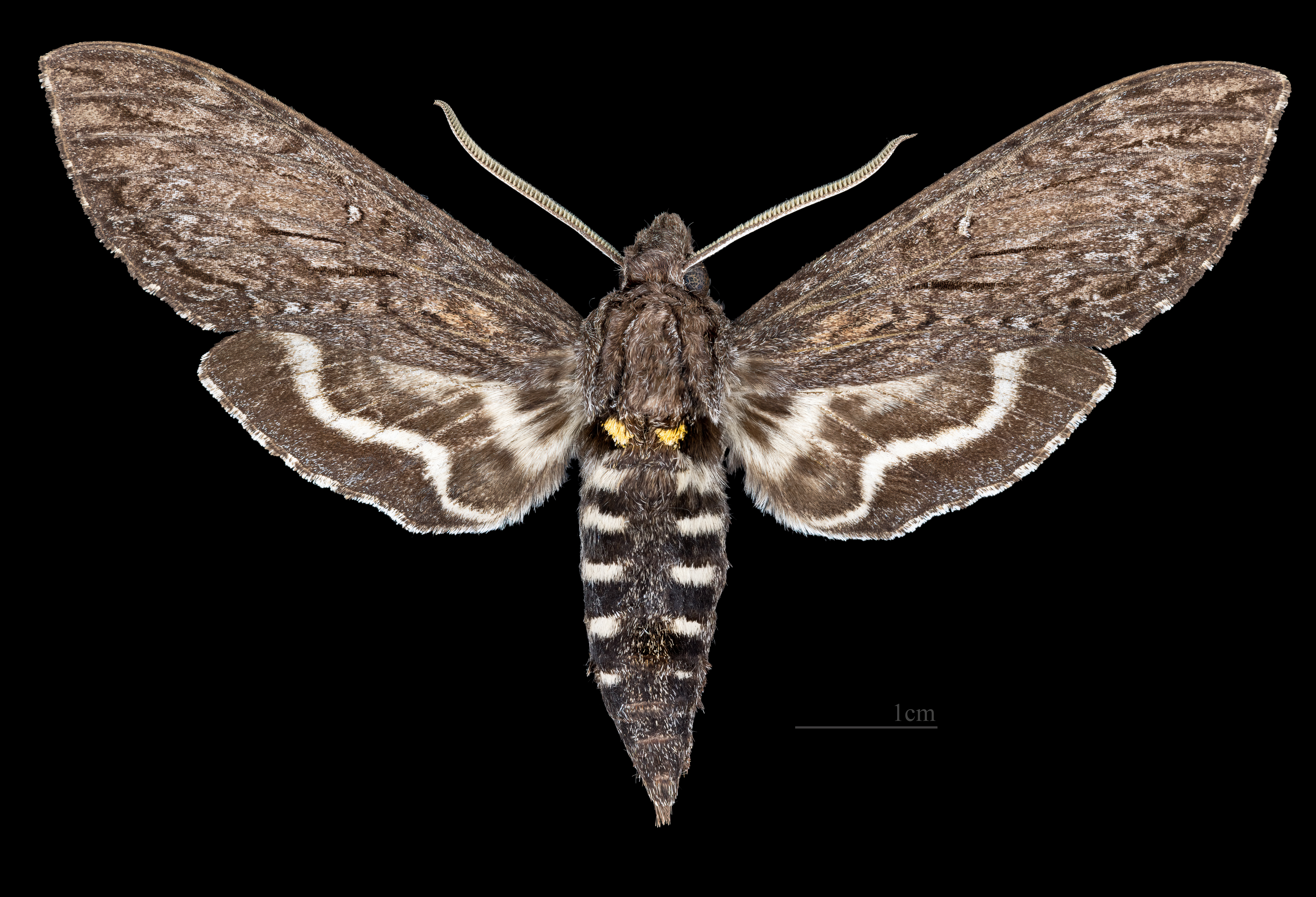
- Lintneria phalerata ♂
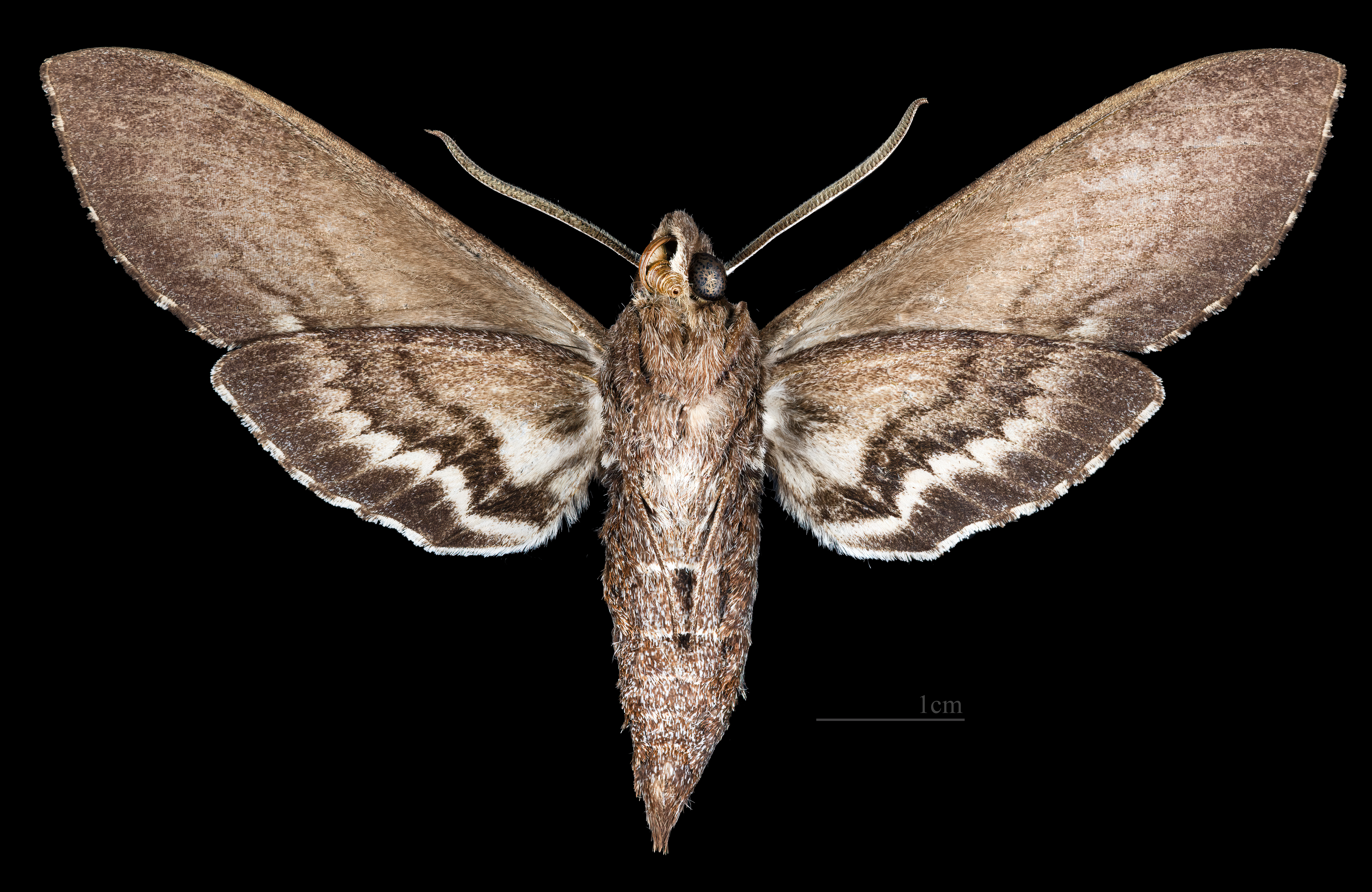
- Lintneria phalerata ♂ △

Scientific classification
- Domain: Eukaryota
- Kingdom: Animalia
- Phylum: Arthropoda
- Class: Insecta
- Order: Lepidoptera
- Family: Sphingidae
- Genus: Lintneria
- Species: L. phalerata

Binomial name
- Lintneria phalerata (Kernbach, 1955)

Synonyms
- Sphinx phalerata Kernbach, 1955

= Lintneria phalerata =

Species of moth

Lintneria phalerata is a moth of the family Sphingidae. It is known from Argentina and Bolivia.

The length of the forewings is 40–45 mm. Adults have been recorded from January to March and in November.

The larvae probably feed on Lamiaceae (such as Salvia, Mentha, Monarda and Hyptis), Hydrophylloideae (such as Wigandia) and Verbenaceae species (such as Verbena and Lantana).
