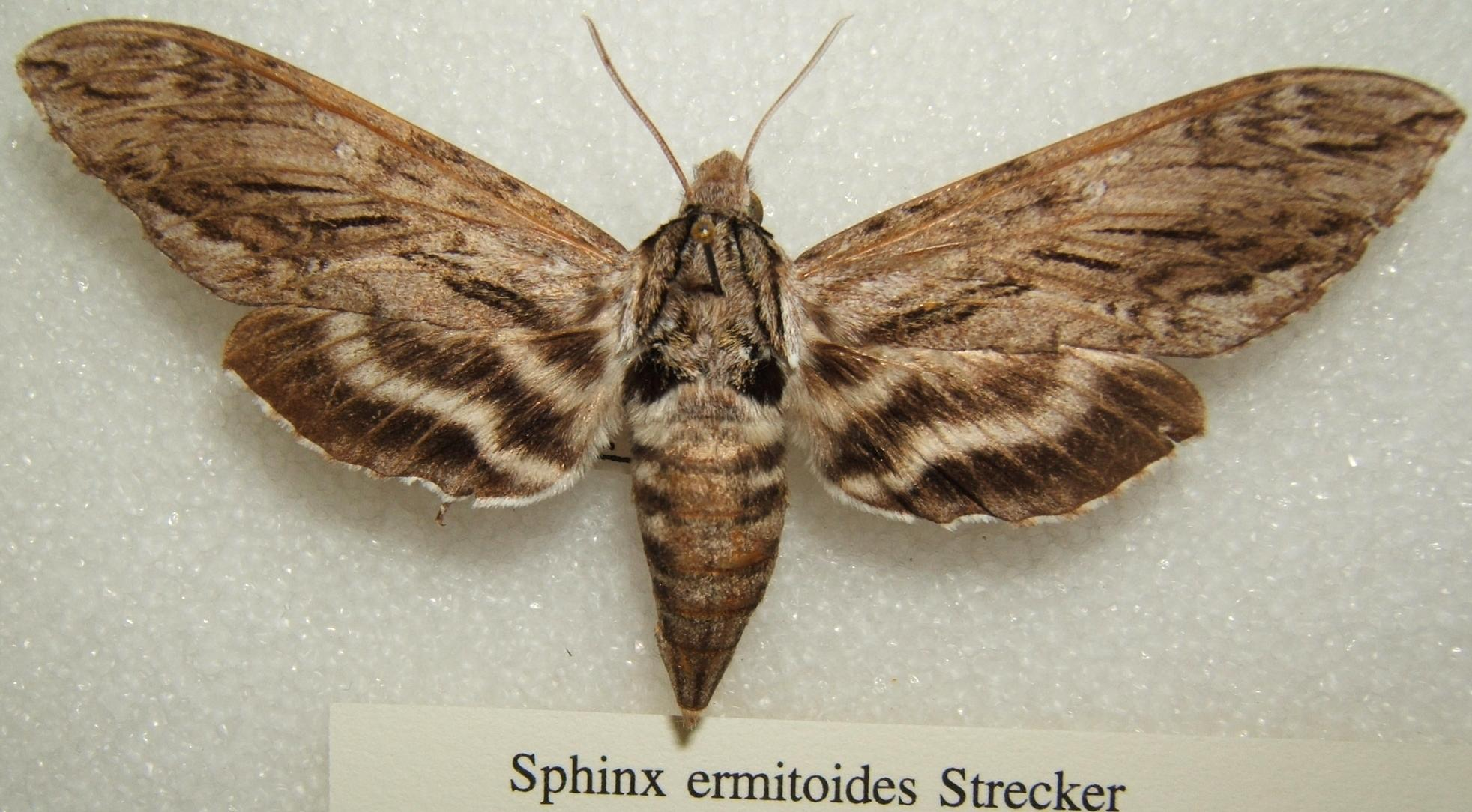

Scientific classification
- Domain: Eukaryota
- Kingdom: Animalia
- Phylum: Arthropoda
- Class: Insecta
- Order: Lepidoptera
- Family: Sphingidae
- Genus: Lintneria
- Species: L. eremitoides

Binomial name
- Lintneria eremitoides (Strecker, 1874)

Synonyms
- Sphinx eremitoides Strecker, 1874

= Lintneria eremitoides =

Sage sphinx

Species of moth

Lintneria eremitoides, the sage sphinx, is a moth from the family Sphingidae. The species was first described by Herman Strecker in 1874. It is known from North America's sandy prairies in the Great Plains from Kansas south through central Oklahoma to Texas, and possibly west to Colorado and New Mexico, and as a rare stray to western Missouri.

The wingspan is 71–90 mm. There are two generations per year with adults on wing from April to May and from August to September. They feed on the nectar of various deep-throated flowers.

The larvae feed on Salvia species.
