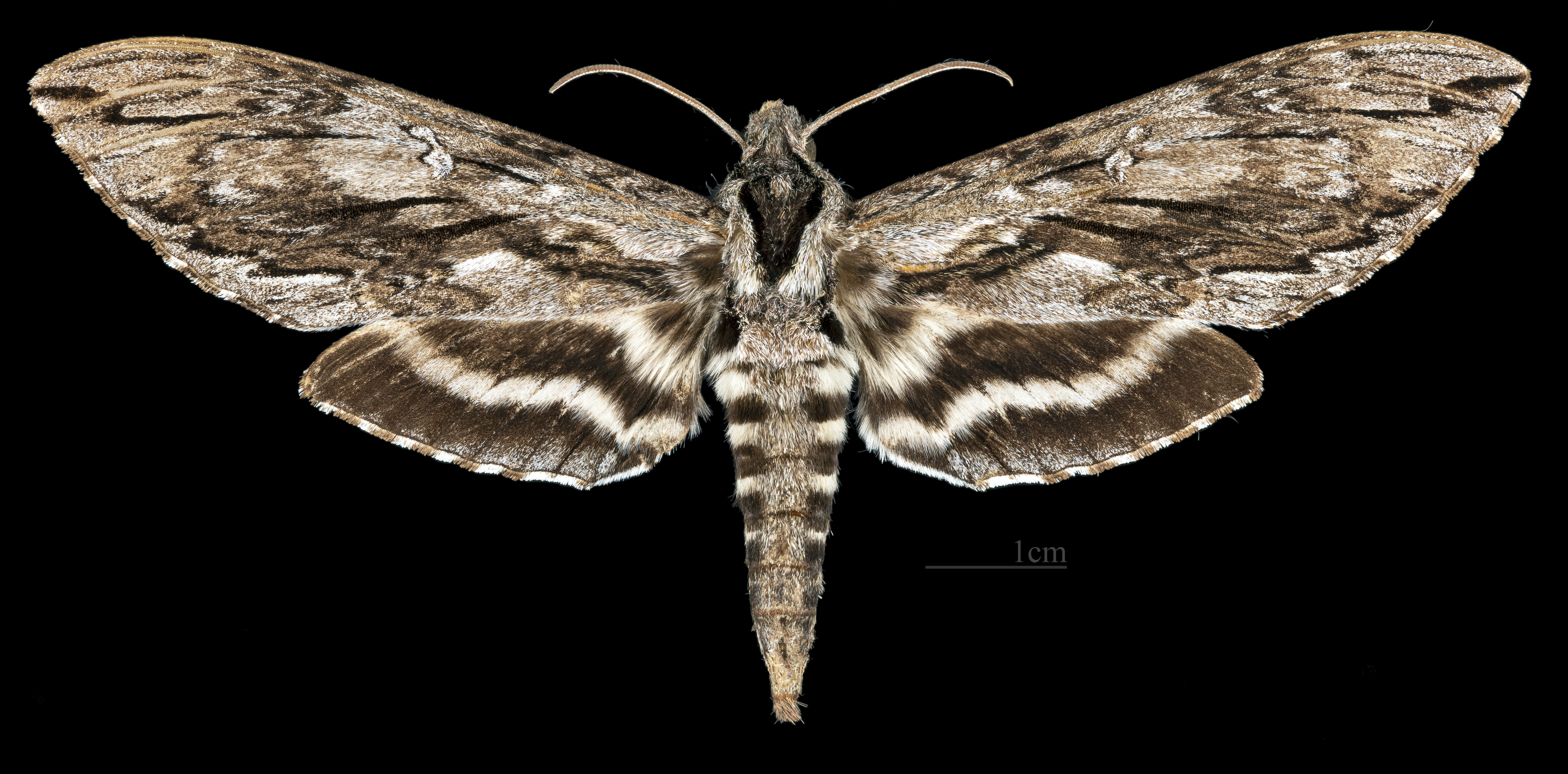
- Lintneria separatus ♂
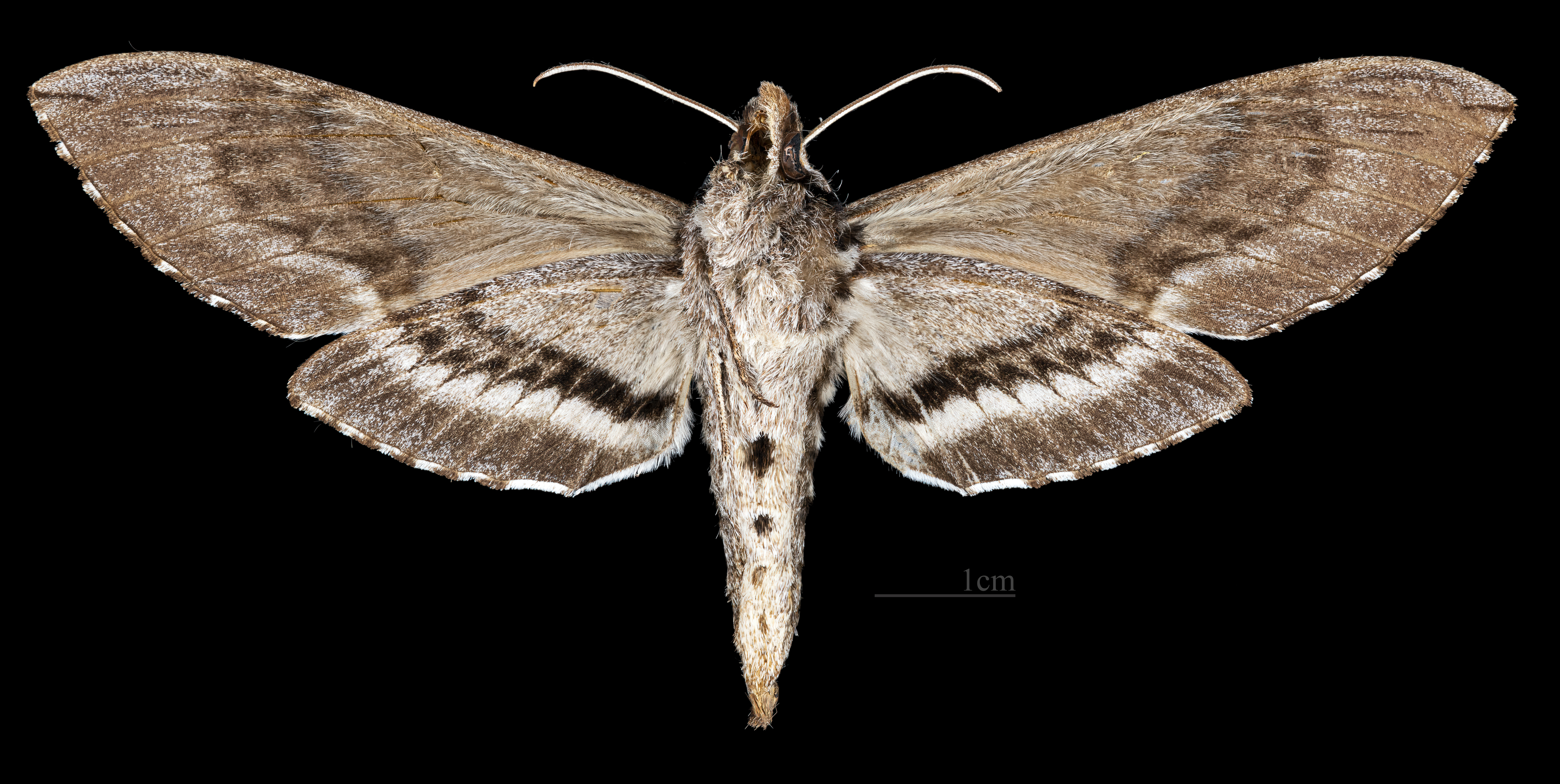
- Lintneria separatus ♂ △

Conservation status
- Apparently Secure (NatureServe)

Scientific classification
- Kingdom: Animalia
- Phylum: Arthropoda
- Class: Insecta
- Order: Lepidoptera
- Family: Sphingidae
- Genus: Lintneria
- Species: L. separatus

Binomial name
- Lintneria separatus (Neumoegen, 1885)

Synonyms
- Sphinx separatus Neumoegen, 1885; Sphinx separatus melaena Rothschild & Jordan, 1916

= Lintneria separatus =

Separated sphinx

Species of moth

Lintneria separatus, the separated sphinx, is a moth of the family Sphingidae. The species was first described by Berthold Neumoegen in 1885. It is found from Colorado south through New Mexico and Arizona to Veracruz and Hidalgo in Mexico.

The wingspan is 110–125 mm. It probably has one brood from late June to early August.

The larvae have been recorded feeding on Salvia greggii.
