= Lintneria biolleyi =

Scientific classification
- Domain: Eukaryota
- Kingdom: Animalia
- Phylum: Arthropoda
- Class: Insecta
- Order: Lepidoptera
- Family: Sphingidae
- Genus: Lintneria
- Species: L. biolleyi

Binomial name
- Lintneria biolleyi (Schaus, 1912)

Synonyms
- Sphinx biolleyi; Hyloicus biolleyi Schaus, 1912

Species of moth

Lintneria biolleyi is a moth of the family Sphingidae. It is known from Costa Rica and Guatemala.

The wingspan is about 90 mm.

The larvae probably feed on Lamiaceae (such as Salvia, Mentha, Monarda and Hyptis), Hydrophylloideae (such as Wigandia) and Verbenaceae species (such as Verbena and Lantana).
