= Lintneria porioni =

Scientific classification
- Kingdom: Animalia
- Phylum: Arthropoda
- Clade: Pancrustacea
- Class: Insecta
- Order: Lepidoptera
- Family: Sphingidae
- Genus: Lintneria
- Species: L. porioni

Binomial name
- Lintneria porioni (Cadiou, 1995)

Synonyms
- Sphinx porioni Cadiou, 1995

Species of moth

Lintneria porioni is a moth of the family Sphingidae. It is known from Peru.

The wingspan is about 110 mm.

There is probably one generation per year with adults recorded from late June to early August. Specimens have been taken at Balsas in early November.

The larvae probably feed on Lamiaceae (such as Salvia, Mentha, Monarda and Hyptis), Hydrophylloideae (such as Wigandia) and Verbenaceae species (such as Verbena and Lantana).
