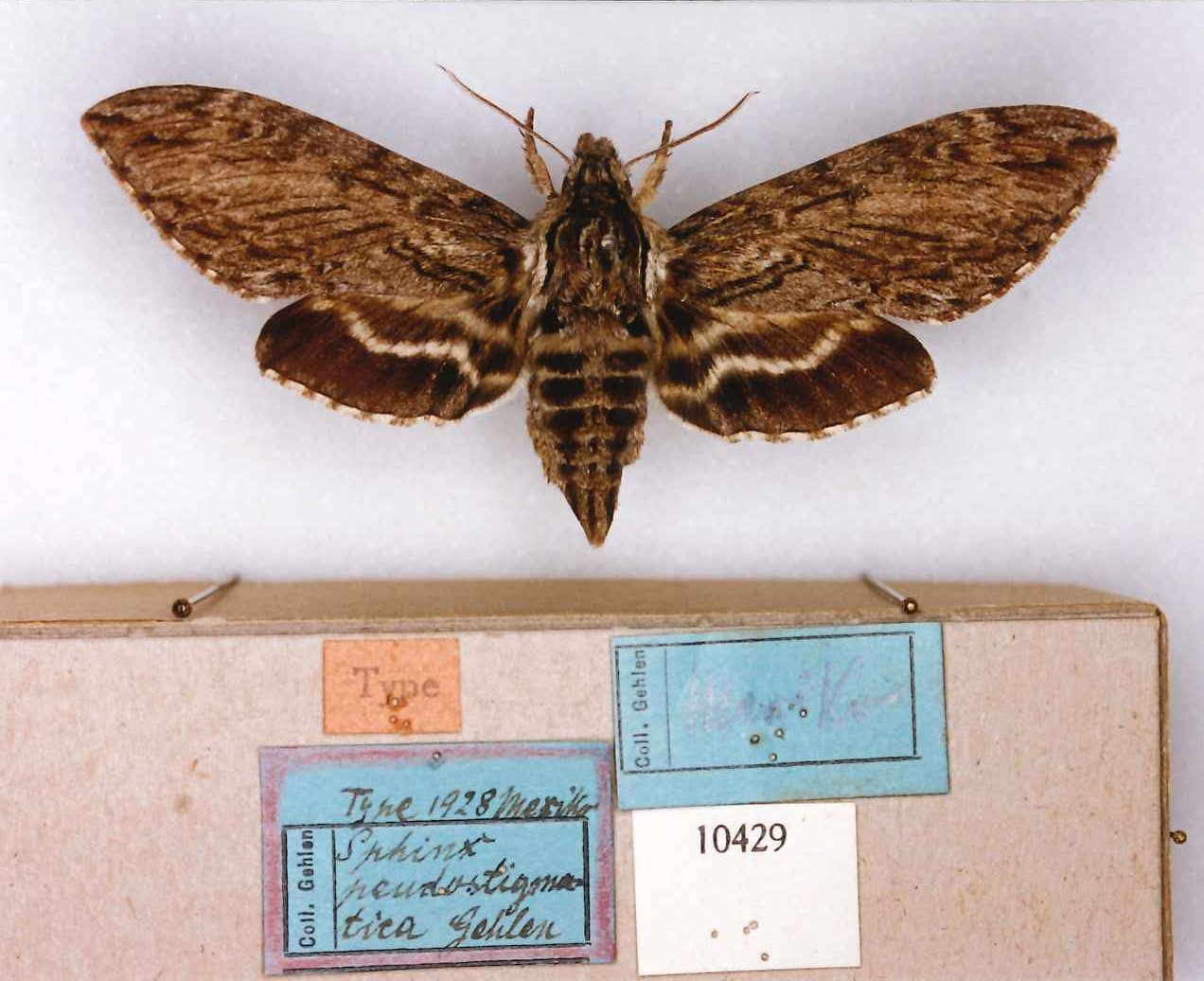

Scientific classification
- Domain: Eukaryota
- Kingdom: Animalia
- Phylum: Arthropoda
- Class: Insecta
- Order: Lepidoptera
- Family: Sphingidae
- Genus: Lintneria
- Species: L. pseudostigmatica

Binomial name
- Lintneria pseudostigmatica (Gehlen, 1928)

Synonyms
- Sphinx pseudostigmatica Gehlen, 1928

= Lintneria pseudostigmatica =

Species of moth

Lintneria pseudostigmatica is a moth of the family Sphingidae. It is known from Mexico.

The larvae have been recorded feeding on Salvia ballotaeflora.
