= Lintneria xantus =

Scientific classification
- Domain: Eukaryota
- Kingdom: Animalia
- Phylum: Arthropoda
- Class: Insecta
- Order: Lepidoptera
- Family: Sphingidae
- Genus: Lintneria
- Species: L. xantus

Binomial name
- Lintneria xantus (Cary, 1963)

Synonyms
- Sphinx xantus Cary, 1963

Species of moth

Lintneria xantus is a moth of the family Sphingidae. It is known from Baja California and north-western Mexico.

The larvae probably feed on Lamiaceae (such as Salvia, Mentha, Monarda and Hyptis), Hydrophylloideae (such as Wigandia) and Verbenaceae species (such as Verbena and Lantana).
