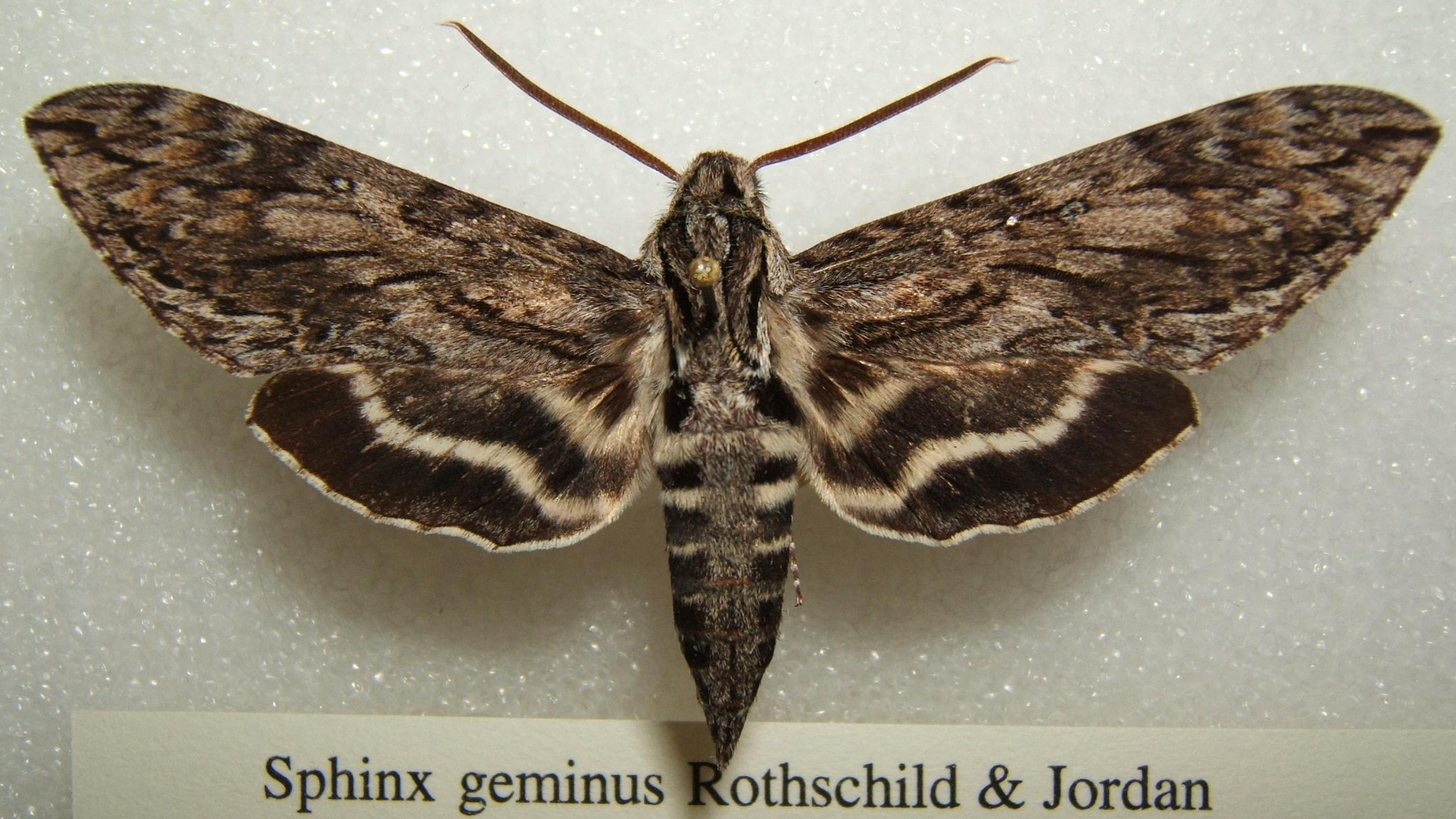

Scientific classification
- Domain: Eukaryota
- Kingdom: Animalia
- Phylum: Arthropoda
- Class: Insecta
- Order: Lepidoptera
- Family: Sphingidae
- Genus: Lintneria
- Species: L. geminus

Binomial name
- Lintneria geminus (Rothschild & Jordan, 1903)

Synonyms
- Sphinx geminus; Hyloicus geminus Rothschild & Jordan, 1903

= Lintneria geminus =

Gemmed sphinx

Species of moth

Lintneria geminus, the gemmed sphinx, is a moth of the family Sphingidae. The species was first described by Walter Rothschild and Karl Jordan in 1903. It is found from Mexico to Honduras and Nicaragua with an occasional stray into Texas.

The wingspan is 92–105 mm. The upperside of the forewings is gray with wavy black and light gray bands and two small gray spots, while the upperside of the hindwing is black with two wavy white bands.

There is one generation per year with adults on wing in from July to August. They feed on the nectar of various deep-throated flowers, including Lonicera japonica, Saponaria officinalis, Petunia species and Catalpa speciosa.
