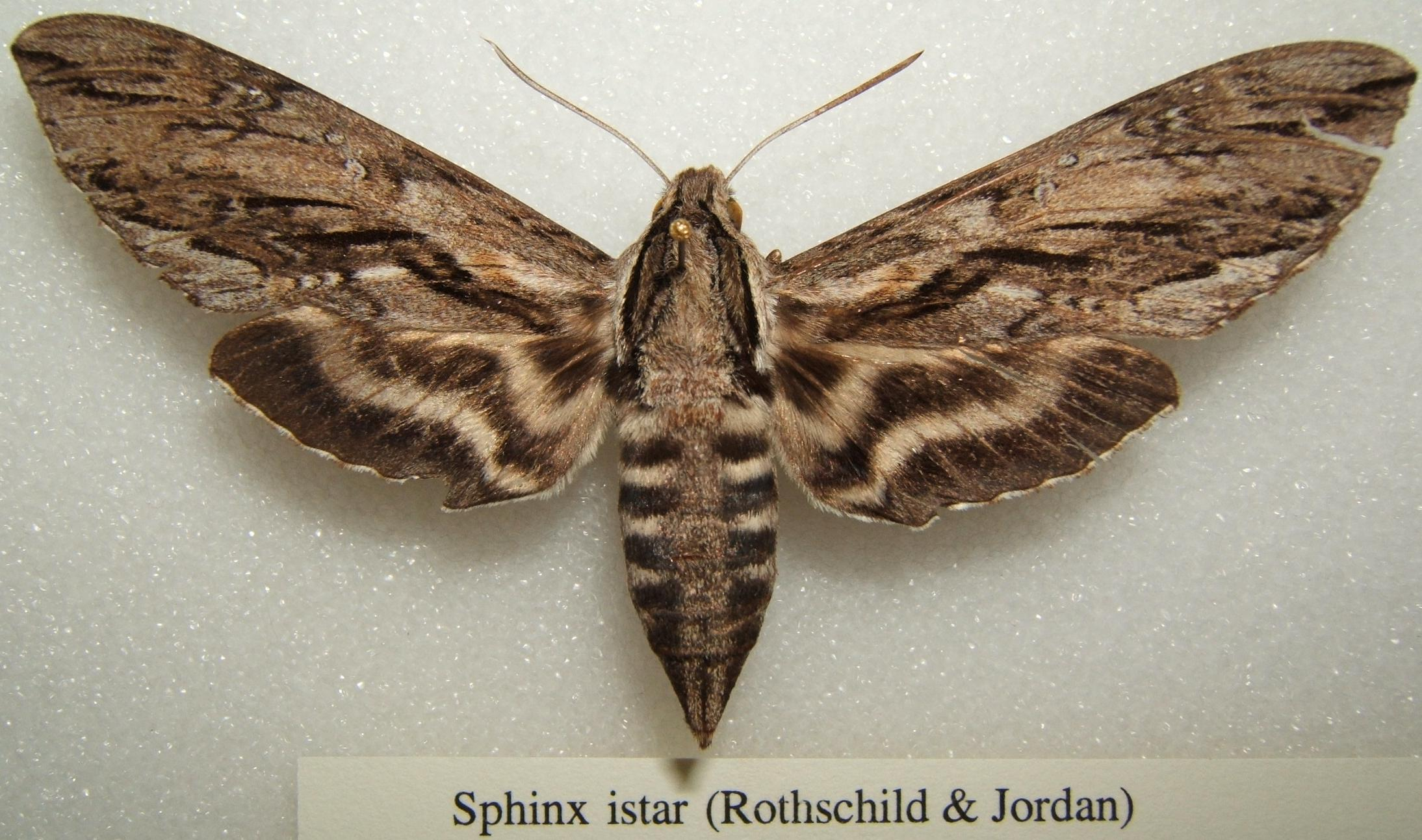

Conservation status
- Apparently Secure (NatureServe)

Scientific classification
- Kingdom: Animalia
- Phylum: Arthropoda
- Class: Insecta
- Order: Lepidoptera
- Family: Sphingidae
- Genus: Lintneria
- Species: L. istar

Binomial name
- Lintneria istar (Rothschild & Jordan, 1903)

Synonyms
- Sphinx istar; Hyloicus istar Rothschild & Jordan, 1903

= Lintneria istar =

Istar sphinx moth

Species of moth

Lintneria istar, the Istar sphinx moth, is a moth of the family Sphingidae. The species was first described by Walter Rothschild and Karl Jordan in 1903. It is found in mountains and pine-oak woodlands from southern Arizona east to southern Texas and south through Mexico to Guatemala.

Adults are on wing from July to September.

The larvae feed on Salvia species.
