= Lintneria tricolor =

Scientific classification
- Domain: Eukaryota
- Kingdom: Animalia
- Phylum: Arthropoda
- Class: Insecta
- Order: Lepidoptera
- Family: Sphingidae
- Genus: Lintneria
- Species: L. tricolor

Binomial name
- Lintneria tricolor (Clark, 1923)

Synonyms
- Sphinx tricolor Clark, 1923

Species of moth

Lintneria tricolor is a moth of the family Sphingidae. It is known from Dominica.

The wingspan is 95–100 mm. Adults have been recorded in June.

The larvae probably feed on Lamiaceae (such as Salvia, Mentha, Monarda and Hyptis), Hydrophylloideae (such as Wigandia) and Verbenaceae species (such as Verbena and Lantana).
