= C16H14O6 =

The molecular formula C_{16}H_{14}O_{6} may refer to:

- Blumeatin, a flavanone
- Dihydrokaempferide, a flavanonol
- Haematoxylin, a natural dye
- Hesperetin, a flavanone
- Homoeriodictyol, a flavanone
- Sterubin, a flavanone
- Thunberginol E, an isocoumarin
