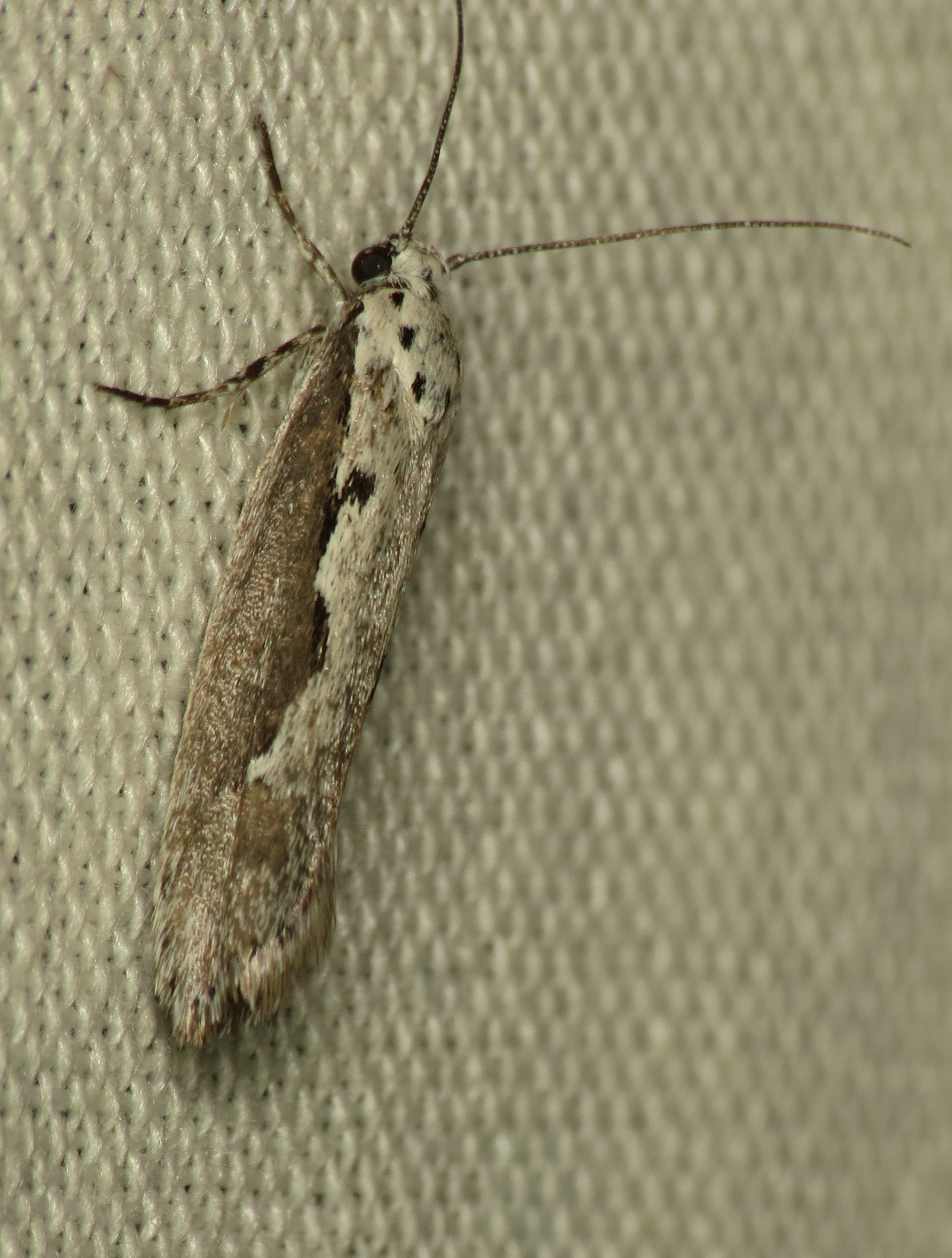

Scientific classification
- Domain: Eukaryota
- Kingdom: Animalia
- Phylum: Arthropoda
- Class: Insecta
- Order: Lepidoptera
- Family: Depressariidae
- Genus: Ethmia
- Species: E. arctostaphylella

Binomial name
- Ethmia arctostaphylella (Walsingham, 1880)

Synonyms
- Psecadia arctostaphylella Walsingham, 1880; Psecadia obscurella Beutenmuller, 1888; Ethmia obscurella Dyar, 1902; Ethmia mediella Busck, 1913

= Ethmia arctostaphylella =

Species of moth

Ethmia arctostaphylella is a moth in the family Depressariidae. It is found in the United States and Mexico from southern Oregon and northern California, southward to the Sierra San Pedro Martir in Baja California and eastward in southern Nevada (Mount Charleston) and Arizona (the Pinaleno Mountains and Oak Creek Canyon). The range possibly extends northward in Oregon and into Utah following the distribution of its host plants.

The length of the forewings is 8.4–11.7 mm (0.33–0.46 in). The ground color of the forewings is divided by longitudinal line and is dark gray on the costal half and whitish gray on the dorsal half. There are several black spots. The ground color of the hindwings is pale to dark gray. Adults are on wing from February to October.

The larvae feed on Eriodictyon species, including Eriodictyon californicum, Eriodictyon tomentosum, Eriodictyon trichocalyx and possibly Eriodictyon angustifolium.
