= Hesperidin =

Flavonoid found in citrus

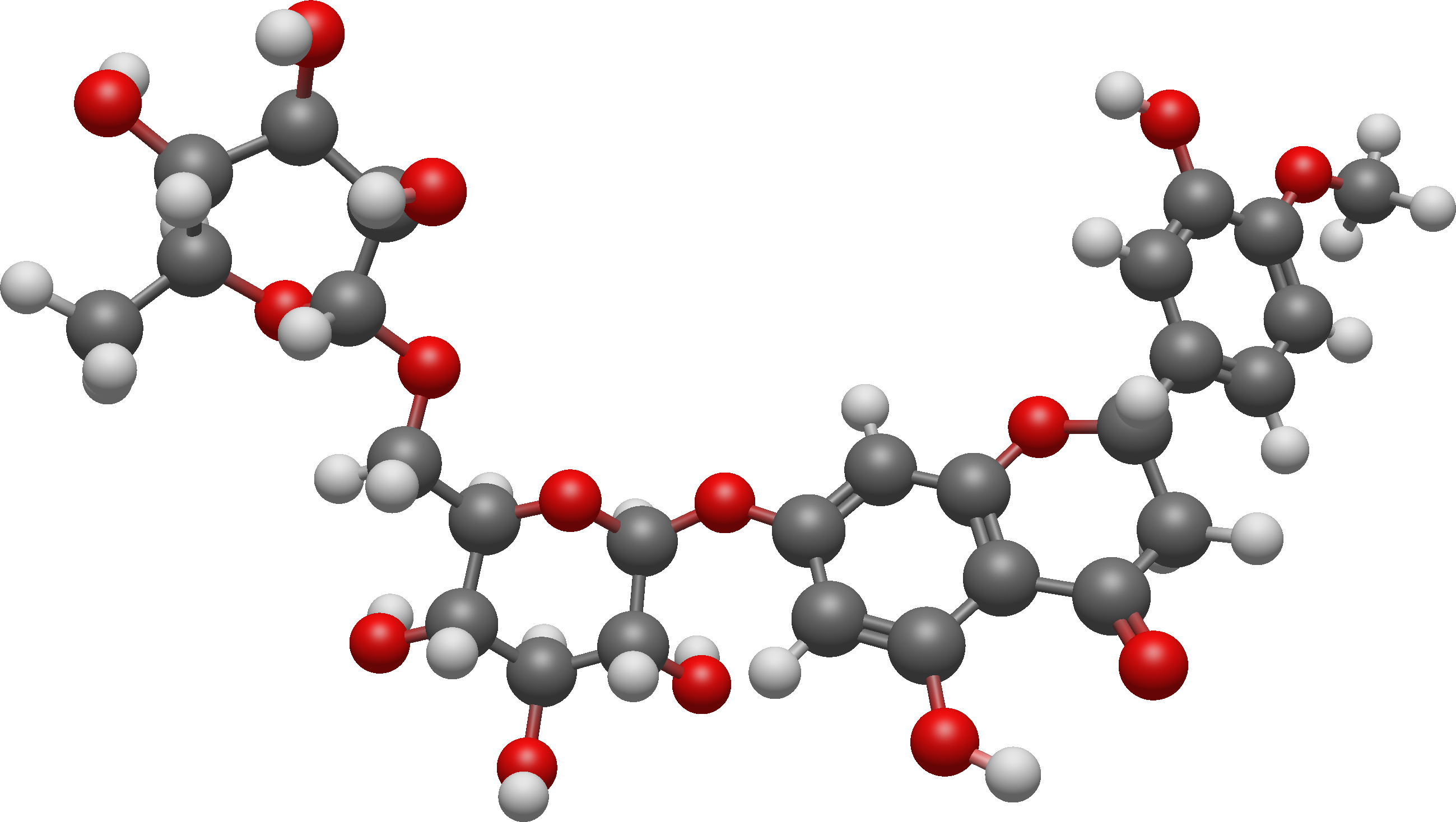

Names
- IUPAC name (2S)-3′,5-Dihydroxy-4′-methoxy-7-[α-L-rhamnopyranosyl-(1→6)-β-D-glucopyranosyloxy]flavan-4-one
- Systematic IUPAC name (2^{2}S,4^{2}S,4^{3}R,4^{4}S,4^{5}S,4^{6}R,7^{2}R,7^{3}R,7^{4}R,7^{5}R,7^{6}S)-1^{3},2^{5},4^{3},4^{4},4^{5},7^{3},7^{4},7^{5}-Octahydroxy-1^{4}-methoxy-7^{6}-methyl-2^{2},2^{3}-dihydro-2^{4}H-3,6-dioxa-2(2,7)-[1]benzopyrana-4(2,6),7(2)-bis(oxana)-1(1)-benzenaheptaphan-2^{4}-one
- Other names Hesperetin, 7-rutinoside, Cirantin, hesperidoside|heperetin, 7-rhamnoglucoside, hesperitin, 7-O-rutinoside

Identifiers
CAS Number	520-26-3
3D model (JSmol)	Interactive image
ChEBI	CHEBI:28775
ChEMBL	ChEMBL449317
ChemSpider	10176
ECHA InfoCard	100.007.536
KEGG	C09755
PubChem CID	10621
UNII	E750O06Y6O
CompTox Dashboard (EPA)	DTXSID9044328
- InChI: InChI=1S/C28H34O15/c1-10-21(32)23(34)25(36)27(40-10)39-9-19-22(33)24(35)26(37)28(43-19)41-12-6-14(30)20-15(31)8-17(42-18(20)7-12)11-3-4-16(38-2)13(29)5-11/h3-7,10,17,19,21-30,32-37H,8-9H2,1-2H3/t10-,17-,19+,21-,22+,23+,24-,25+,26+,27+,28+/m0/s1 Key: QUQPHWDTPGMPEX-QJBIFVCTSA-N; InChI=1/C28H34O15/c1-10-21(32)23(34)25(36)27(40-10)39-9-19-22(33)24(35)26(37)28(43-19)41-12-6-14(30)20-15(31)8-17(42-18(20)7-12)11-3-4-16(38-2)13(29)5-11/h3-7,10,17,19,21-30,32-37H,8-9H2,1-2H3/t10-,17-,19+,21-,22+,23+,24-,25+,26+,27+,28+/m0/s1 Key: QUQPHWDTPGMPEX-QJBIFVCTBQ; InChI=1/C28H34O15/c1-10-21(32)23(34)25(36)27(40-10)39-9-19-22(33)24(35)26(37)28(43-19)41-12-6-14(30)20-15(31)8-17(42-18(20)7-12)11-3-4-16(38-2)13(29)5-11/h3-7,10,17,19,21-30,32-37H,8-9H2,1-2H3/t10-,17-,19+,21-,22+,23+,24-,25+,26+,27+,28+/m0/s1 Key: QUQPHWDTPGMPEX-QJBIFVCTBQ
- SMILES: O=C4c5c(O)cc(O[C@@H]2O[C@H](CO[C@@H]1O[C@H]([C@H](O)[C@@H](O)[C@H]1O)C)[C@@H](O)[C@H](O)[C@H]2O)cc5O[C@H](c3ccc(OC)c(O)c3)C4

Properties
Chemical formula	C_{28}H_{34}O_{15}
Molar mass	610.565 g·mol^{−1}
Density	1.65 ± 0.1g/mL (predicted)
Melting point	262 °C
Boiling point	930.1 ± 65 °C (predicted)
- Except where otherwise noted, data are given for materials in their standard state (at 25 °C [77 °F], 100 kPa). verify (what is ?) Infobox references

Hesperidin is a flavanone glycoside found in citrus fruits. Its aglycone is hesperetin. Its name is derived from the word "hesperidium", for fruit produced by citrus trees.

Hesperidin was first isolated in 1828 by French chemist M. Lebreton from the white inner layer of citrus peels (mesocarp, albedo).

Hesperidin is believed to play a role in plant defense.

== Sources ==
=== Rutaceae ===
- 700–2,500 ppm in fruit of Citrus aurantium (bitter orange, petitgrain)
- in orange juice (Citrus sinensis)
- in Zanthoxylum gilletii
- in lemon
- in lime
- in leaves of Agathosma serratifolia

=== Lamiaceae ===
Peppermint contains hesperidin.

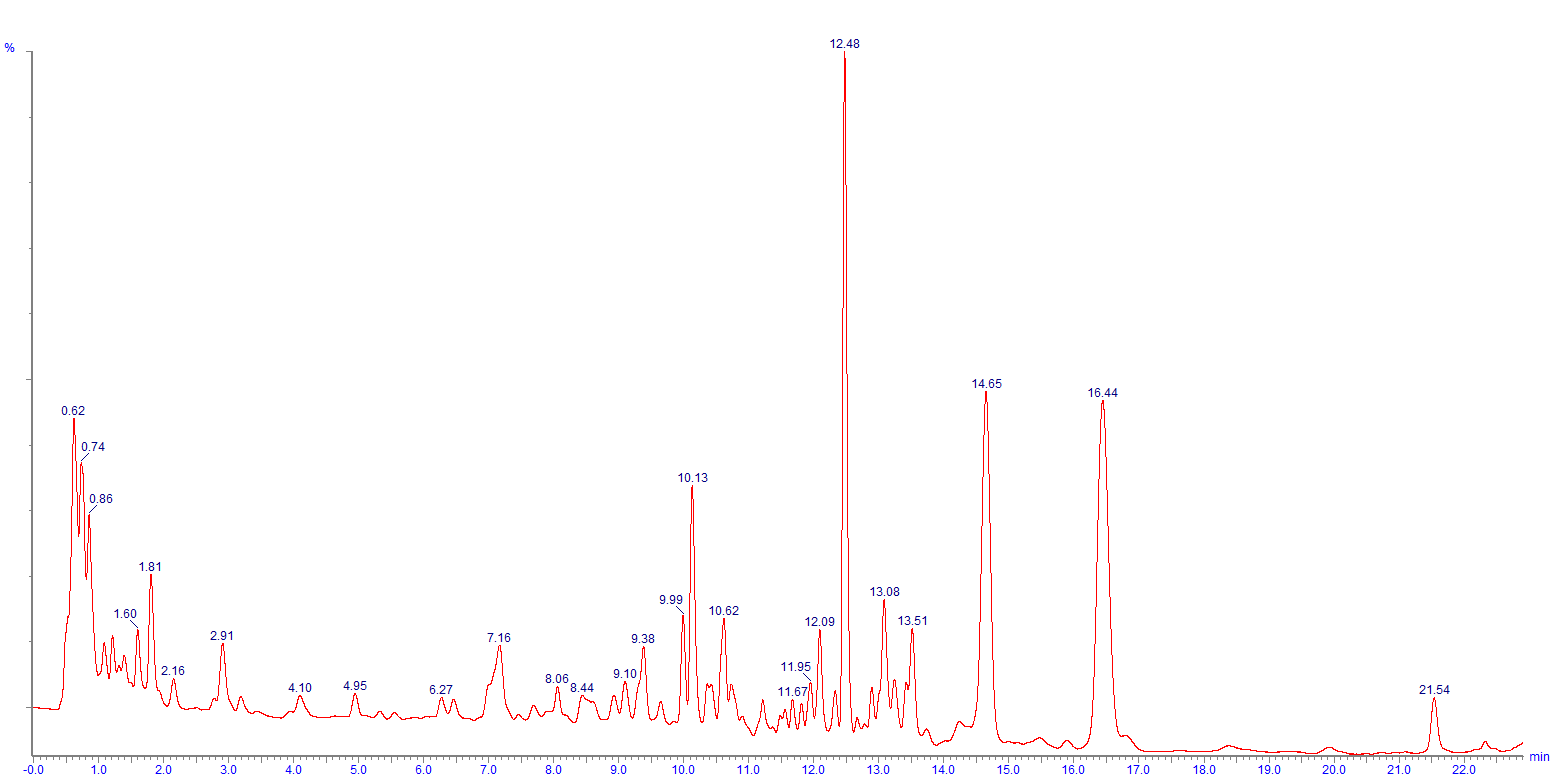
Ultraviolet 280 nm chromatogram after UHPLC separation of commercial orange juice. Hesperidin is the peak at 16.44 min.

=== Content in foods ===
Approximate hesperidin content per 100 ml or 100 g

- 481 mg peppermint, dried
- 44 mg blood orange, pure juice
- 26 mg orange, pure juice
- 18 mg lemon, pure juice
- 14 mg lime, pure juice
- 1 mg grapefruit, pure juice

== Metabolism ==
Hesperidin 6-O-α-L-rhamnosyl-β-D-glucosidase, an enzyme that uses hesperidin and water to produce hesperetin and rutinose, is found in the Ascomycetes species.

== Research ==
As a flavanone found in the rinds of citrus fruits (such as oranges or lemons), hesperidin is under preliminary research for its possible biological properties in vivo. One review did not find evidence that hesperidin affected blood lipid levels or hypertension. Another review found that hesperidin may improve endothelial function in humans, but the overall results were inconclusive.

== Biosynthesis ==
The biosynthesis of hesperidin proceeds from L-phenylalanine in nine steps.

The biosynthesis of hesperidin stems from the phenylpropanoid pathway, in which the natural amino acid L-phenylalanine undergoes a deamination by phenylalanine ammonia lyase to afford (E)-cinnamate. The resulting monocarboxylate undergoes an oxidation by cinnamate 4-hydroxylase to afford (E)-4-coumarate, which is transformed into (E)-4-coumaroyl-CoA by 4-coumarate-CoA ligase. (E)-4-coumaroyl-CoA is then subjected to the type III polyketide synthase naringenin chalcone synthase, undergoing successive condensation reactions and ultimately a ring-closing Claisen condensation to afford naringenin chalcone. The corresponding chalcone undergoes an isomerization by chalcone isomerase to afford (2S)-naringenin, which is oxidized to (2S)-eriodictyol by flavonoid 3′-hydroxylase. After O-methylation by caffeoyl-CoA O-methyltransferase, the hesperitin product undergoes a glycosylation by flavanone 7-O-glucosyltransferase to afford hesperitin-7-O-β-D-glucoside. Finally, a rhamnosyl moiety is introduced to the monoglycosylated product by 1,2-rhamnosyltransferase, forming hesperidin.

== See also ==
- Diosmin
- List of phytochemicals in food
- List of MeSH codes (D03)
- List of food additives
