= C27H32O15 =

The molecular formula C_{27}H_{32}O_{15} (molar mass: 596.53 g/mol, exact mass: 596.1741 u) may refer to:

- Eriocitrin (eriodictyol glycoside)
- Neoeriocitrin
