= C27H30O17 =

The molecular formula C_{27}H_{30}O_{17} (molar mass: 626 g/mol, exact mass: 626.1482994 u) may refer to:

- Myricetin 3-O-rutinoside, a flavonol glycoside
- Quercetin 3,4'-diglucoside, a flavonol glycoside
