= Neoeriocitrin =

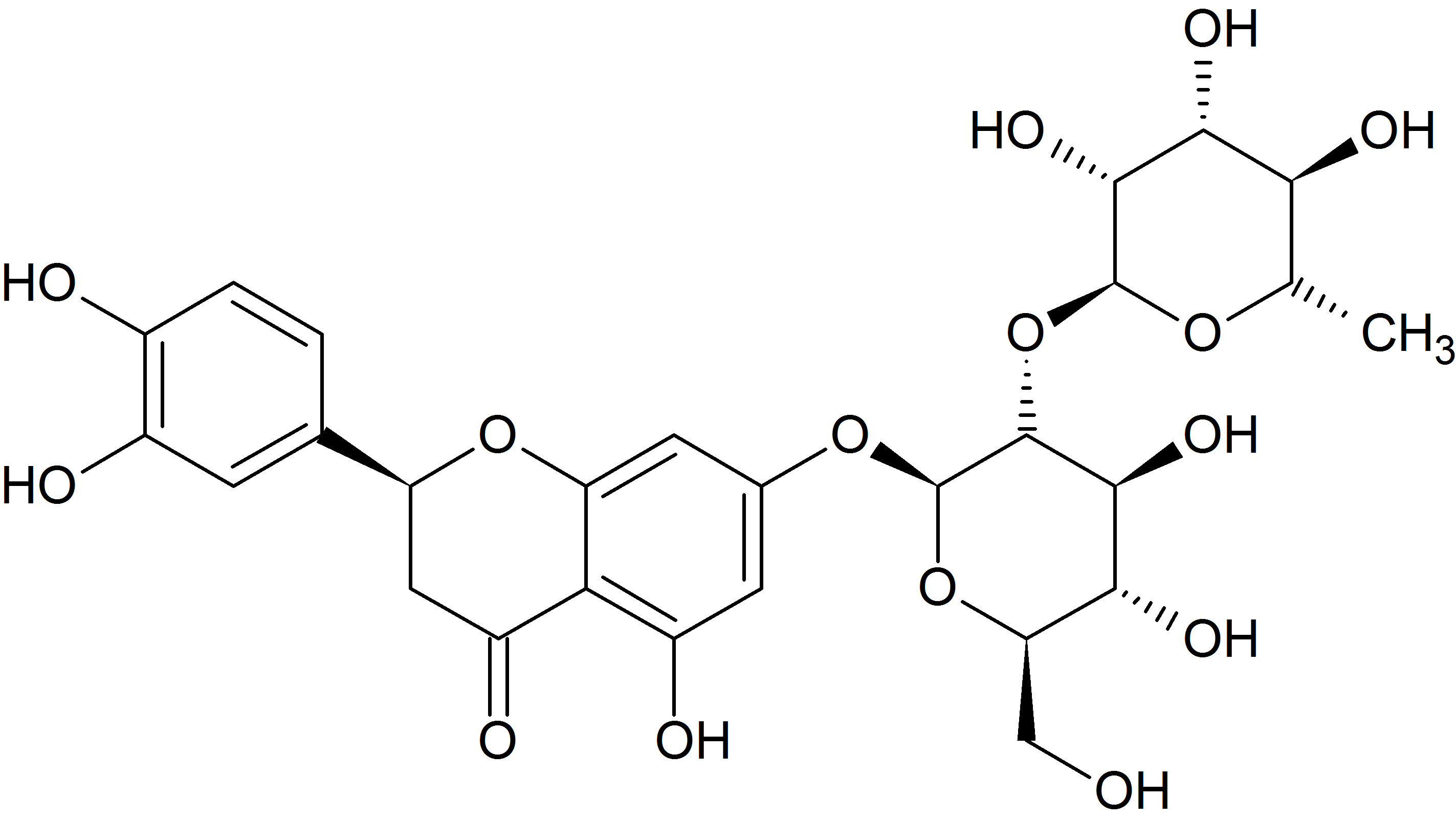

Names
- IUPAC name (2S)-3′,4′,5-Trihydroxy-7-[α-L-rhamnopyranosyl-(1→2)-β-D-glucopyranosyloxy]flavan-4-one
- Systematic IUPAC name (2S)-7-{[(2S,3R,4S,5S,6R)-4,5-Dihydroxy-6-(hydroxymethyl)-3-{[(2S,3R,4R,5R,6S)-3,4,5-trihydroxy-6-methyloxan-2-yl]oxy}oxan-2-yl]oxy}-2-(3,4-dihydroxyphenyl)-5-hydroxy-2,3-dihydro-4H-1-benzopyran-4-one
- Other names Eriodictyol-7-O-neohesperidoside

Identifiers
CAS Number	13241-32-2
3D model (JSmol)	Interactive image
ChEBI	CHEBI:7502
ChemSpider	102656
ECHA InfoCard	100.032.909
KEGG	C09805
PubChem CID	114627
UNII	AA3CDU8N34
CompTox Dashboard (EPA)	DTXSID70157530
- InChI: InChI=1S/C27H32O15/c1-9-20(33)22(35)24(37)26(38-9)42-25-23(36)21(34)18(8-28)41-27(25)39-11-5-14(31)19-15(32)7-16(40-17(19)6-11)10-2-3-12(29)13(30)4-10/h2-6,9,16,18,20-31,33-37H,7-8H2,1H3/t9-,16-,18+,20-,21+,22+,23-,24+,25+,26-,27+/m0/s1 Key: OBKKEZLIABHSGY-DOYQYKRZSA-N; InChI=1/C27H32O15/c1-9-20(33)22(35)24(37)26(38-9)42-25-23(36)21(34)18(8-28)41-27(25)39-11-5-14(31)19-15(32)7-16(40-17(19)6-11)10-2-3-12(29)13(30)4-10/h2-6,9,16,18,20-31,33-37H,7-8H2,1H3/t9-,16-,18+,20-,21+,22+,23-,24+,25+,26-,27+/m0/s1 Key: OBKKEZLIABHSGY-DOYQYKRZBY
- SMILES: C[C@H]1[C@@H]([C@H]([C@H]([C@@H](O1)O[C@@H]2[C@H]([C@@H]([C@H](O[C@H]2OC3=CC(=C4C(=O)C[C@H](OC4=C3)C5=CC(=C(C=C5)O)O)O)CO)O)O)O)O)O

Properties
Chemical formula	C_{27}H_{32}O_{15}
Molar mass	596.538 g·mol^{−1}
- Except where otherwise noted, data are given for materials in their standard state (at 25 °C [77 °F], 100 kPa). Infobox references

Neoeriocitrin is a 7-O-glycoside of the flavanone eriodictyol and the disaccharide neohesperidose (α-L-rhamnopyranosyl-(1→2)-β-D-glucopyranose). Note that the 'neo' in the name in this case does not refer to the position of the B-ring (which is not in a neo position), but refer to the glycosyl moiety.
