= Apiforol =

- Chemical structure of Apiforol.

Names
- IUPAC name (2S)-2-(4-Hydroxyphenyl)-3,4-dihydro-2H-chromene-4,5,7-triol

Identifiers
CAS Number	55167-29-8
3D model (JSmol)	Interactive image; Interactive image
ChEBI	CHEBI:74812
ChemSpider	391780
KEGG	C12124
PubChem CID	443638
CompTox Dashboard (EPA)	DTXSID60970513
- InChI: InChI=1S/C15H14O5/c16-9-3-1-8(2-4-9)13-7-12(19)15-11(18)5-10(17)6-14(15)20-13/h1-6,12-13,16-19H,7H2/t12?,13-/m0/s1 Key: RPKUCYSGAXIESU-ABLWVSNPSA-N
- SMILES: C1C(C2=C(C=C(C=C2OC1C3=CC=C(C=C3)O)O)O)O; Oc1ccc(cc1)[C@H]3Oc2cc(O)cc(O)c2C(O)C3

Properties
Chemical formula	C_{15}H_{14}O_{5}
Molar mass	274.272 g·mol^{−1}
- Except where otherwise noted, data are given for materials in their standard state (at 25 °C [77 °F], 100 kPa). verify (what is ?) Infobox references

Apiforol is a chemical compound belonging to the flavan-4ol class of flavonoids.

== Metabolism ==
Flavanone 4-reductase is an enzyme transforming naringenin into apiforol. This enzyme can be found in Columnea hybrida, in Malus domestica, in Pyrus communis, in Sinningia cardinalis, and in Zea mays.
