= Eriocitrin =

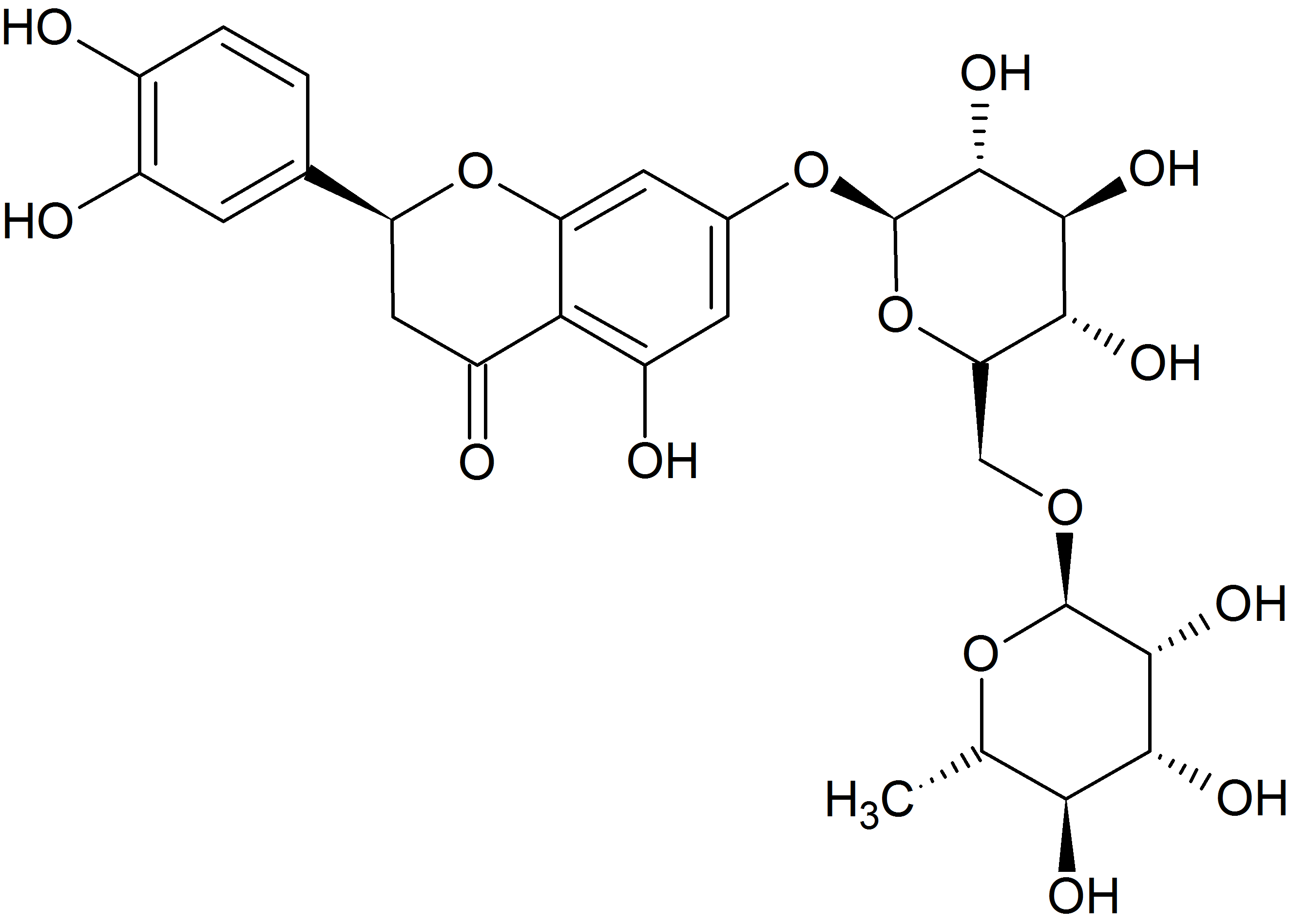

Names
- IUPAC name (2S)-3′,4′,5-Trihydroxy-7-[α-L-rhamnopyranosyl-(1→6)-β-D-glucopyranosyloxy]flavan-4-one
- Systematic IUPAC name (2^{2}S,4^{2}S,4^{3}R,4^{4}S,4^{5}S,4^{6}R,7^{2}R,7^{3}R,7^{4}R,7^{5}R,7^{6}S)-1^{3},1^{4},2^{5},4^{3},4^{4},4^{5},7^{3},7^{4},7^{5}-Nonahydroxy-7^{6}-methyl-2^{2},2^{3}-dihydro-2^{4}H-3,6-dioxa-2(2,7)-[1]benzopyrana-4(2,6),7(2)-bis(oxana)-1(1)-benzenaheptaphan-2^{4}-one
- Other names Eriodictyol glycoside Eriodictyol-7-O-rutinoside

Identifiers
| CAS Number | 13463-28-0 |
| 3D model (JSmol) | Interactive image |
| ChemSpider | 75327 |
| ECHA InfoCard | 100.033.321 |
| KEGG | C09732 |
| PubChem CID | 83489 |
| UNII | AS293HR5XQ |
- InChI: InChI=1S/C27H32O15/c1-9-20(32)22(34)24(36)26(39-9)38-8-18-21(33)23(35)25(37)27(42-18)40-11-5-14(30)19-15(31)7-16(41-17(19)6-11)10-2-3-12(28)13(29)4-10/h2-6,9,16,18,20-30,32-37H,7-8H2,1H3/t9-,16-,18+,20-,21+,22+,23-,24+,25+,26+,27+/m0/s1 Key: OMQADRGFMLGFJF-MNPJBKLOSA-N; InChI=1/C27H32O15/c1-9-20(32)22(34)24(36)26(39-9)38-8-18-21(33)23(35)25(37)27(42-18)40-11-5-14(30)19-15(31)7-16(41-17(19)6-11)10-2-3-12(28)13(29)4-10/h2-6,9,16,18,20-30,32-37H,7-8H2,1H3/t9-,16-,18+,20-,21+,22+,23-,24+,25+,26+,27+/m0/s1 Key: OMQADRGFMLGFJF-MNPJBKLOBI
- SMILES: C[C@H]1[C@@H]([C@H]([C@H]([C@@H](O1)OC[C@@H]2[C@H]([C@@H]([C@H]([C@@H](O2)Oc3cc(c4c(c3)O[C@@H](CC4=O)c5ccc(c(c5)O)O)O)O)O)O)O)O)O

Properties
| Chemical formula | C_{27}H_{32}O_{15} |
| Molar mass | 596.538 g·mol^{−1} |
- Except where otherwise noted, data are given for materials in their standard state (at 25 °C [77 °F], 100 kPa). Infobox references

Eriocitrin (eriodictyol glycoside) is a flavanone-7-O-glycoside between the flavanone eriodictyol and the disaccharide rutinose. It is commonly found in lemons and other citrus fruits. It is colloquially called lemon flavonoid or a citrus flavonoid, one of the plant pigments that bring color to fruit and flowers. This antioxidant also predominates (38% in 1 study) in Peppermint infusions.

The compound has lipid-lowering properties in liver cells. It is marketed as a dietary supplement, usually in conjunction with B and C vitamins and other substances, but there is no established medical use or FDA approved application of the compound.

== Clinical Significance ==
The effectiveness of Eriocitrin in managing hyperglycemia and reversal of prediabetes condition was demonstrated in a double-blind, randomized controlled study. This study evaluated the potential effectiveness of different doses of Eriomin on hyperglycemia and insulin resistance associated with other metabolic biomarkers in prediabetic individuals. Prediabetes patients (n = 103, 49 ± 10 years) were randomly divided into four parallel groups: (a) Placebo; (b) Eriomin 200 mg; (c) Eriomin 400 mg; and (d) Eriomin 800 mg. Assessment of biochemical, metabolic, inflammatory, hepatic, renal, anthropometric markers, blood pressure, and dietary parameters were performed during 12 weeks of intervention. Treatment with all doses of Eriomin (200, 400, and 800 mg) had similar effects and altered significantly the following variables: blood glucose (−5%), insulin resistance (−7%), glucose intolerance (−7%), glycated hemoglobin (−2%), glucagon (−6.5%), C-peptide (−5%), hsCRP (−12%), interleukin-6 (−13%), TNFα (−11%), lipid peroxidation (−17%), systolic blood pressure (−8%), GLP-1 (+15%), adiponectin (+19%), and antioxidant capacity (+6%). Eriomin or placebo did not influence the anthropometric and dietary variables. Short-term intervention with Eriomin, at doses of 200, 400, or 800 mg/day, benefited glycemic control, reduced systemic inflammation and oxidative stress, and reversed the prediabetic condition in 24% of the evaluated patients.

A published crossover-randomized clinical trial researched the nutraceutical Eriocitrin (Eriomin) in reducing hyperglycemia by increasing glucagon-like peptide 1 and downregulates systemic inflammation. This double-blind, randomized, placebo/controlled, crossover study evaluated the efficacy of Eriomin in reducing hyperglycemia and improving diabetes-related biomarkers in individuals with hyperglycemia above 110 mg/dL (mean 123 ± 18 mg/dL). Subjects (n = 30), divided into two groups (Eriomin or Placebo), who received a dose of 200 mg/d of the designated supplement for 12 weeks and, after a washout period of 2 weeks, switched to the other supplement in the following 12 weeks. Assessments of biochemical, metabolic, inflammatory, blood pressure, anthropometry, and dietary parameters were performed at the beginning and end of each intervention. Treatment with 200 mg/d of Eriomin significantly decreased blood glucose (−5%), homeostasis model assessment of insulin resistance (−11%), glucagon (−13%), interleukin-6 (−14%), tumor necrosis factor alpha (−20%), and alkaline phosphatase (−13%); but increased glucagon-like peptide 1 (GLP-1) by (17%) (P ≤ .05). At the end of the placebo period, there was a 13% increase in triglycerides (P ≤ .05). Other parameters evaluated did not change with Eriomin or placebo. In conclusion, intervention with Eriomin benefited the glycemic control of prediabetic and diabetic patients, with higher blood glucose levels, by increasing GLP-1 and decreasing systemic inflammation.

== See also ==
- Rutin
- Quercetin
