= Hesperidin 6-O-alpha-L-rhamnosyl-beta-D-glucosidase =

Identifiers
- EC no.: 3.2.1.168

Databases
- BRENDA: enzyme data
- ExPASy: NiceZyme view
- KEGG: enzyme entry
- MetaCyc: metabolic pathway
- Rhea: reactions
- PDB structures: RCSB PDB PDBe PDBsum
Search
- PMC: articles
- PubMed: articles
- NCBI: proteins

Hesperidin 6-O-alpha-L-rhamnosyl-beta-D-glucosidase (EC 3.2.1.168) is an enzyme with systematic name hesperetin 7-(6-O-alpha-L-rhamnopyranosyl-beta-D-glucopyranoside) 6-O-alpha-rhamnopyranosyl-beta-glucohydrolase. It catalyses the following chemical reaction

hesperidin
H_{2}O
hesperetin
+
rutinose

The enzyme characterised from Stilbella fimetaria removes the rutinose glycoside unit (shown in its aldehydo form) from hesperidin, to give the flavone hesperetin. It exhibits high specificity towards 7-O-linked flavonoid beta-rutinosides.

The enzyme is produced by the fungus Acremonium sp. DSM24697. The genera Acremonium and morphologically similar Stilbella have not yet been fully studied on a molecular basis. Under the morphological basis, the fungus Stilbella fimetaria SES201 was reidentified as Acremonium sp. SES201 = DSM24697.
