= Neohesperidose =

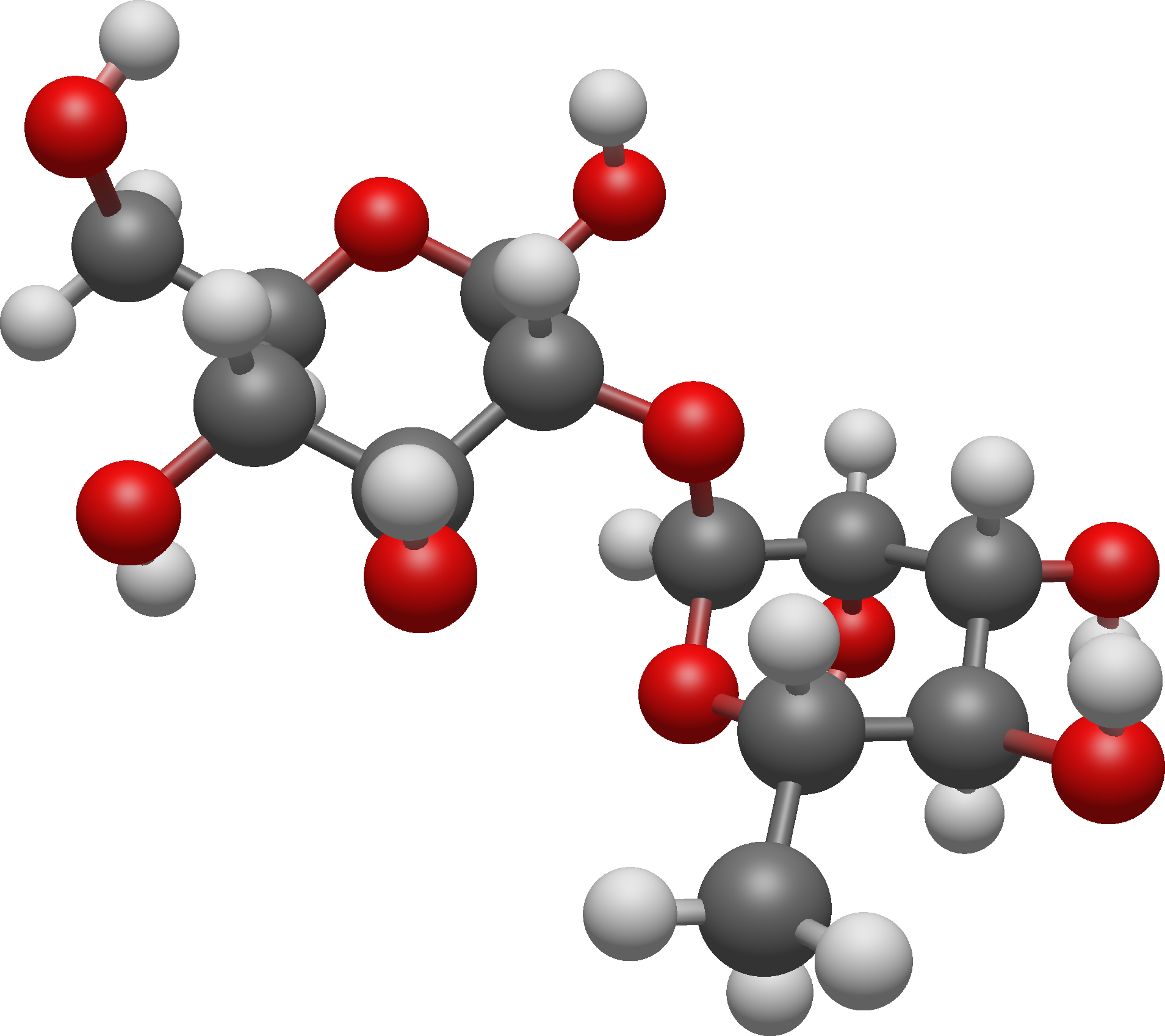

Names
- IUPAC name α-L-Rhamnopyranosyl-(1→2)-D-glucose
- Systematic IUPAC name (2R,3S,4R,5R)-3,4,5,6-Tetrahydroxy-2-{[(2S,3R,4R,5R,6S)-3,4,5-trihydroxy-6-methyloxan-2-yl]oxy}hexanal
- Other names 2-O-alpha-L-Rhamnopyranosyl-D-glucopyranose; 2-O-alpha-L-Rhamnosyl-D-glucose; 2-O-(6-deoxy-alpha-L-mannopyranosyl)-beta-D-glucopyranose

Identifiers
| CAS Number | 17074-02-1 |
| 3D model (JSmol) | Interactive image |
| ChEBI | CHEBI:73992 |
| ChEMBL | ChEMBL1651520 |
| ChemSpider | 390159 |
| ECHA InfoCard | 100.037.379 |
| KEGG | C08244 |
| PubChem CID | 441426 |
| CompTox Dashboard (EPA) | DTXSID20937829 |
- InChI: InChI=1S/C12H22O10/c1-3-5(14)7(16)9(18)12(20-3)22-10-8(17)6(15)4(2-13)21-11(10)19/h3-19H,2H2,1H3/t3-,4+,5-,6+,7+,8-,9+,10+,11+,12-/m0/s1 Key: VSRVRBXGIRFARR-OUEGHFHCSA-N; InChI=1/C12H22O10/c1-3-5(14)7(16)9(18)12(20-3)22-10-8(17)6(15)4(2-13)21-11(10)19/h3-19H,2H2,1H3/t3-,4+,5-,6+,7+,8-,9+,10+,11+,12-/m0/s1 Key: VSRVRBXGIRFARR-OUEGHFHCBJ
- SMILES: O([C@H]1[C@H](O)O[C@H](CO)[C@@H](O)[C@@H]1O)[C@@H]2O[C@H]([C@H](O)[C@@H](O)[C@H]2O)C

Properties
| Chemical formula | C_{12}H_{22}O_{10} |
| Molar mass | 326.29 g/mol |
| Density | 1.662 g/mL |

Related compounds
| Related compounds | Rhamnose; Glucose |
- Except where otherwise noted, data are given for materials in their standard state (at 25 °C [77 °F], 100 kPa). verify (what is ?) Infobox references

Neohesperidose is the disaccharide which is present in some flavonoids. It can be found in species of Typha.

== Neohesperidosides ==
- Cyanidin-3-neohesperidoside
- Delphinidin-3-neohesperidoside
- Rhoifolin or apigenin 7-O-neohesperidoside
- Myricetin-3-O-neohesperidoside found in Physalis angulata
- Neohesperidin (hesperetin 7-O-neohesperidoside)
- Neoeriocitrin (eriodictyol 7-O-neohesperidoside)

== See also ==
- Pyranose
