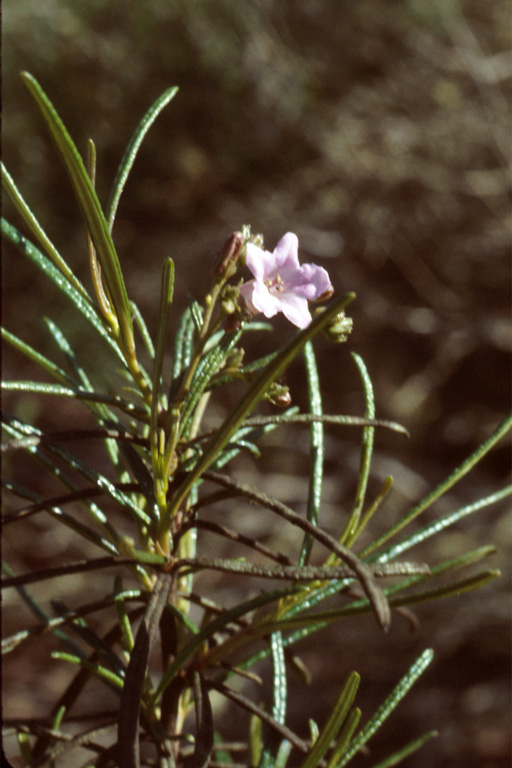

Conservation status
- Endangered (ESA)

Scientific classification
- Kingdom: Plantae
- Clade: Embryophytes
- Clade: Tracheophytes
- Clade: Spermatophytes
- Clade: Angiosperms
- Clade: Eudicots
- Clade: Asterids
- Order: Boraginales
- Family: Namaceae
- Genus: Eriodictyon
- Species: E. altissimum

Binomial name
- Eriodictyon altissimum P.V.Wells

= Eriodictyon altissimum =

Species of flowering plant

Eriodictyon altissimum is a rare species of flowering plant in the borage family known by the common name Indian Knob mountainbalm. It is endemic to San Luis Obispo County, California, where it is known from only about six occurrences in the Irish Hills on the coast and nearby Indian Knob.

== Description ==
This is a shrub growing erect to a maximum height of nearly 4 meters. It has shreddy bark on its larger branches and stems and a sticky exudate on its smaller twigs. The narrow, linear leaves are up to 9 centimeters long, white-hairy on the undersides and hairless and sticky on top. The inflorescence is a curled cluster of bell-shaped lavender flowers, each just over a centimeter long. The fruit is a small capsule containing many tiny seeds.

== Conservation ==
It grows in scrub, oak woodland, and chaparral habitats on sandstone soils. When the plant was federally listed as an endangered species in 1994, fewer than 600 individuals were known to remain. This plant sometimes occurs with the threatened endemic Morro manzanita (Arctostaphylos morroensis). There are occurrences on protected land within Montaña de Oro State Park and the Morro Dunes Ecological Reserve. When the plant was listed as an endangered species, the main threat to its survival was habitat destruction; by 2009, enough of the plants were located on protected land that this is no longer considered a major threat. For this reason, the United States Fish and Wildlife Service has recommended that the species be downlisted to threatened status.
