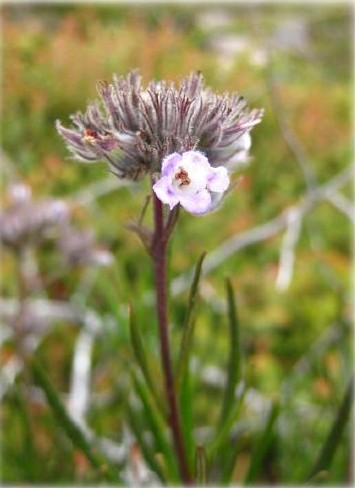

Conservation status
- Endangered (ESA)

Scientific classification
- Kingdom: Plantae
- Clade: Tracheophytes
- Clade: Angiosperms
- Clade: Eudicots
- Clade: Asterids
- Order: Boraginales
- Family: Namaceae
- Genus: Eriodictyon
- Species: E. capitatum

Binomial name
- Eriodictyon capitatum Eastw.

= Eriodictyon capitatum =

Species of flowering plant

Eriodictyon capitatum, the Lompoc yerba santa, is a rare evergreen shrub in the family Namaceae. It is endemic to western Santa Barbara County, in California.

== Distribution ==
The plant is endemic to western Santa Barbara County, California, where it is known from only five remaining populations, two of which are located on Vandenberg Air Force Base. It was made a federally listed endangered species in 2000. Besides the Vandenberg populations, there are two populations located just north of Lompoc and a single population just south on the slopes of the Santa Ynez Mountains.

=== Ecology ===
This plant grows in two types of habitat. The first is California coastal sage and chaparral, including maritime chaparral and coastal sage scrub on sandstone soils. Here it grows amongst buckbrush (Ceanothus cuneatus), black sage (Salvia mellifera) and California sagebrush (Artemisia californica). The second habitat type of the plant is coastal coniferous forest, where it is often associated with bishop pine (Pinus muricata).

== Description ==
Eriodictyon capitatum produces hairless, resinous, sticky stems up to about 3 meters (9 feet) tall. The bark is shreddy.

The leathery herbage is aromatic, lining the stems with very narrow linear leaves up to 9 centimeters long.

The inflorescence is a cluster of hairy bell-shaped lavender flowers.

The plant undergoes both sexual and vegetative reproduction. During the latter it produces more aboveground stems from its rootstock, sometimes creating a "population" of many plants which are actually one genetic individual. Some occurrences are made up of fewer than 20 plants.

== Conservation ==
Threats to the existence of this species include non-native plants and fire management regimes in the area. Also, the plant is not prolific in its reproduction, producing little seed. Because some colonies are made up of clones, this self-incompatible plant has less chance of being pollinated by genetically separate individuals.

== See also ==
- California chaparral and woodlands
- California coastal sage and chaparral ecoregion
