= Luteoforol =

- Chemical structure of luteoforol

Names
- IUPAC name (2S)-2-(3,4-dihydroxyphenyl)-3,4-dihydro-2H-chromene-4,5,7-triol
- Other names 3-Deoxyleucocyanidin

Identifiers
CAS Number	24897-98-1
3D model (JSmol)	Interactive image
ChEBI	CHEBI:27686
ChemSpider	102562
KEGG	C05907
PubChem CID	440834
UNII	830GM1N73B
CompTox Dashboard (EPA)	DTXSID901336190
- InChI: InChI=1S/C15H14O6/c16-8-4-11(19)15-12(20)6-13(21-14(15)5-8)7-1-2-9(17)10(18)3-7/h1-5,12-13,16-20H,6H2/t12?,13-/m0/s1 Key: FSYDWKPCKNCRDI-ABLWVSNPSA-N
- SMILES: C1C(C2=C(C=C(C=C2OC1C3=CC(=C(C=C3)O)O)O)O)O

Properties
Chemical formula	C_{15}H_{14}O_{6}
Molar mass	290.26 g/mol
- Except where otherwise noted, data are given for materials in their standard state (at 25 °C [77 °F], 100 kPa). verify (what is ?) Infobox references

Luteoforol is a chemical compound belonging to the flavan-4-ol class of flavonoids.

Luteoforol is induced in pome fruits by prohexadione-calcium.
