= Hesperetin =

- Hesperetin

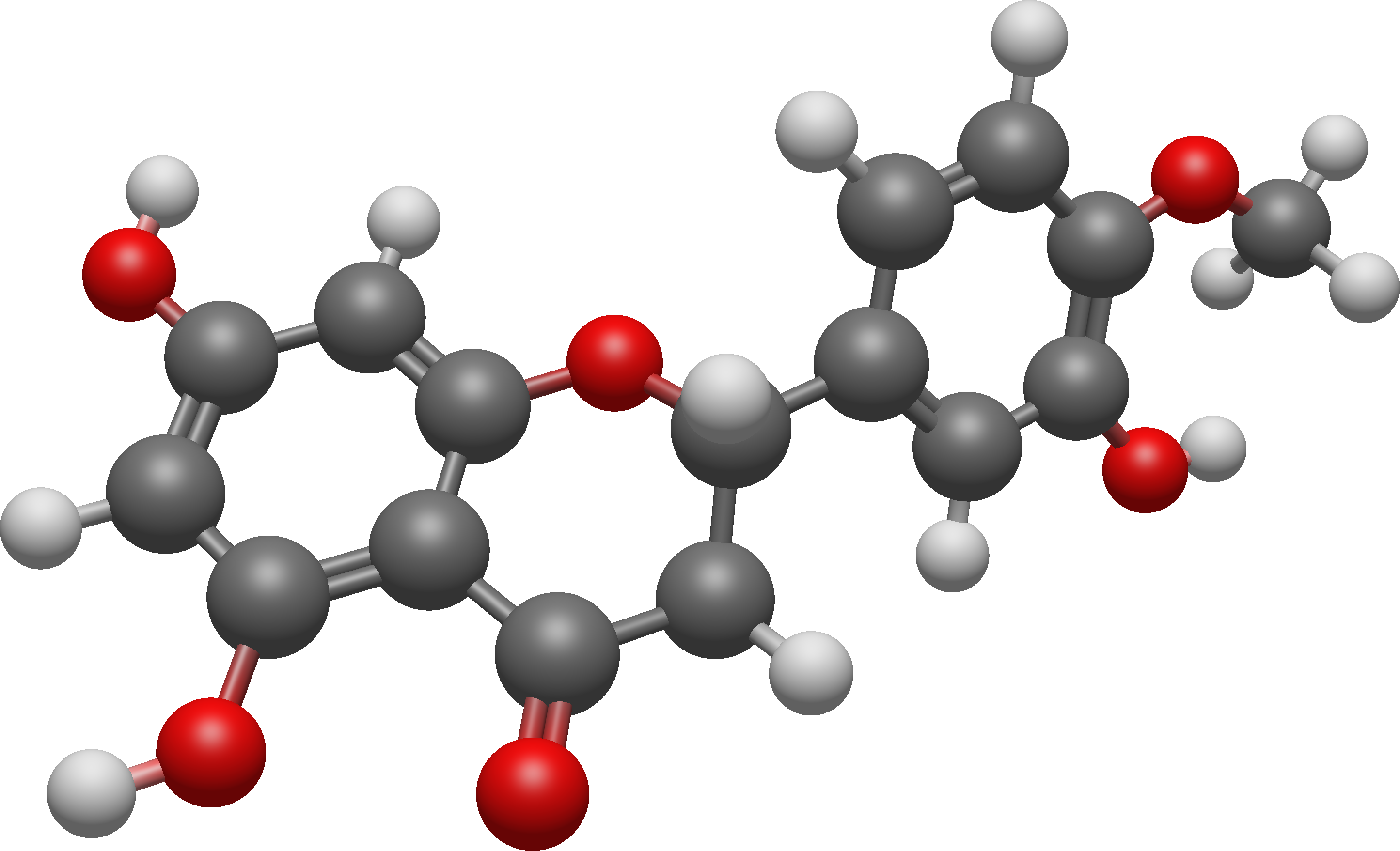
- Hesperetin

Names
- IUPAC name (2S)-3′,5,7-Trihydroxy-4′-methoxyflavan-4-one
- Systematic IUPAC name (2S)-5,7-Dihydroxy-2-(3-hydroxy-4-methoxyphenyl)-2,3-dihydro-4H-1-benzopyran-4-one

Identifiers
CAS Number	520-33-2
3D model (JSmol)	Interactive image
ChEBI	CHEBI:28230
ChEMBL	ChEMBL399121
ChemSpider	65234
DrugBank	DB01094
ECHA InfoCard	100.007.538
EC Number	208-290-2
KEGG	C01709
PubChem CID	72281
UNII	Q9Q3D557F1
CompTox Dashboard (EPA)	DTXSID4022319
- InChI: InChI=1S/C16H14O6/c1-21-13-3-2-8(4-10(13)18)14-7-12(20)16-11(19)5-9(17)6-15(16)22-14/h2-6,14,17-19H,7H2,1H3/t14-/m0/s1 Key: AIONOLUJZLIMTK-AWEZNQCLSA-N; InChI=1/C16H14O6/c1-21-13-3-2-8(4-10(13)18)14-7-12(20)16-11(19)5-9(17)6-15(16)22-14/h2-6,14,17-19H,7H2,1H3/t14-/m0/s1 Key: AIONOLUJZLIMTK-AWEZNQCLBH
- SMILES: O=C2c3c(O[C@H](c1ccc(OC)c(O)c1)C2)cc(O)cc3O

Properties
Chemical formula	C_{16}H_{14}O_{6}
Molar mass	302.282 g·mol^{−1}
Melting point	226–228 °C (439–442 °F; 499–501 K)
Solubility in other solvents	Sol. EtOH, alkalis
- Except where otherwise noted, data are given for materials in their standard state (at 25 °C [77 °F], 100 kPa). verify (what is ?) Infobox references

Hesperetin is the 4'-methoxy derivative of eriodictyol, a flavanone. The 7-O-glycoside of hesperetin, hesperidin, is a naturally occurring flavanone-glycoside, the main flavonoid in grapefruits, lemons, and sweet oranges.

== Glycosides ==
Various glycosides of hesperetin are known, including hesperidin (hesperetin-7-O-rutinoside), a water-insoluble flavonoid glycoside with low water solubility, Hesperidin is found in citrus fruits and upon ingestion it releases its aglycone, hesperetin. Neohesperidin is the 7-O-neohesperidoside of hesperetin.

== Metabolism ==
Hesperidin 6-O-α-L-rhamnosyl-β-D-glucosidase is an enzyme that uses hesperidin and H_{2}O to produce hesperetin and rutinose. Upon digestion in the gastrointestinal tract, hesperetin – as for all flavonoids – is rapidly metabolized in intestinal and liver cells, releasing smaller metabolites into the blood and urine for excretion. The biological effects of such metabolites in vivo are unknown.

== Laboratory research ==
In vitro, hesperetin may affect the slow inactivation phase of inward sodium current channels, and therefore could be used as a template to develop drugs against cardiac arrhythmias. Hesperetin also inhibits TRPM3 channels in vitro.
