= Sakuranin =

- Sakuranin

Names
- IUPAC name (2S)-5-(β-D-Glucopyranosyloxy)-4′-hydroxy-7-methoxyflavan-4-one
- Systematic IUPAC name (2S)-2-(4-Hydroxyphenyl)-7-methoxy-5-{[(2S,3R,4S,5S,6R)-3,4,5-trihydroxy-6-(hydroxymethyl)oxan-2-yl]oxy}-2,3-dihydro-4H-1-benzopyran-4-one

Identifiers
CAS Number	529-39-5
3D model (JSmol)	Interactive image
ChemSpider	66275
PubChem CID	73607
UNII	59YX7QWM4S
CompTox Dashboard (EPA)	DTXSID20967363
- InChI: InChI=1S/C22H24O10/c1-29-12-6-15-18(13(25)8-14(30-15)10-2-4-11(24)5-3-10)16(7-12)31-22-21(28)20(27)19(26)17(9-23)32-22/h2-7,14,17,19-24,26-28H,8-9H2,1H3/t14-,17+,19+,20-,21+,22+/m0/s1 Key: NEPMMBQHELYZIW-YMTXFHFDSA-N; InChI=1/C22H24O10/c1-29-12-6-15-18(13(25)8-14(30-15)10-2-4-11(24)5-3-10)16(7-12)31-22-21(28)20(27)19(26)17(9-23)32-22/h2-7,14,17,19-24,26-28H,8-9H2,1H3/t14-,17+,19+,20-,21+,22+/m0/s1 Key: NEPMMBQHELYZIW-YMTXFHFDBM
- SMILES: COC1=CC(=C2C(=O)C[C@H](OC2=C1)C3=CC=C(C=C3)O)O[C@H]4[C@@H]([C@H]([C@@H]([C@H](O4)CO)O)O)O

Properties
Chemical formula	C_{22}H_{24}O_{10}
Molar mass	448.424 g·mol^{−1}
- Except where otherwise noted, data are given for materials in their standard state (at 25 °C [77 °F], 100 kPa). verify (what is ?) Infobox references

Sakuranin is a flavanone, a type of flavonoid. It is the O-glucoside of sakuranetin. It can be found in Prunus sp.
