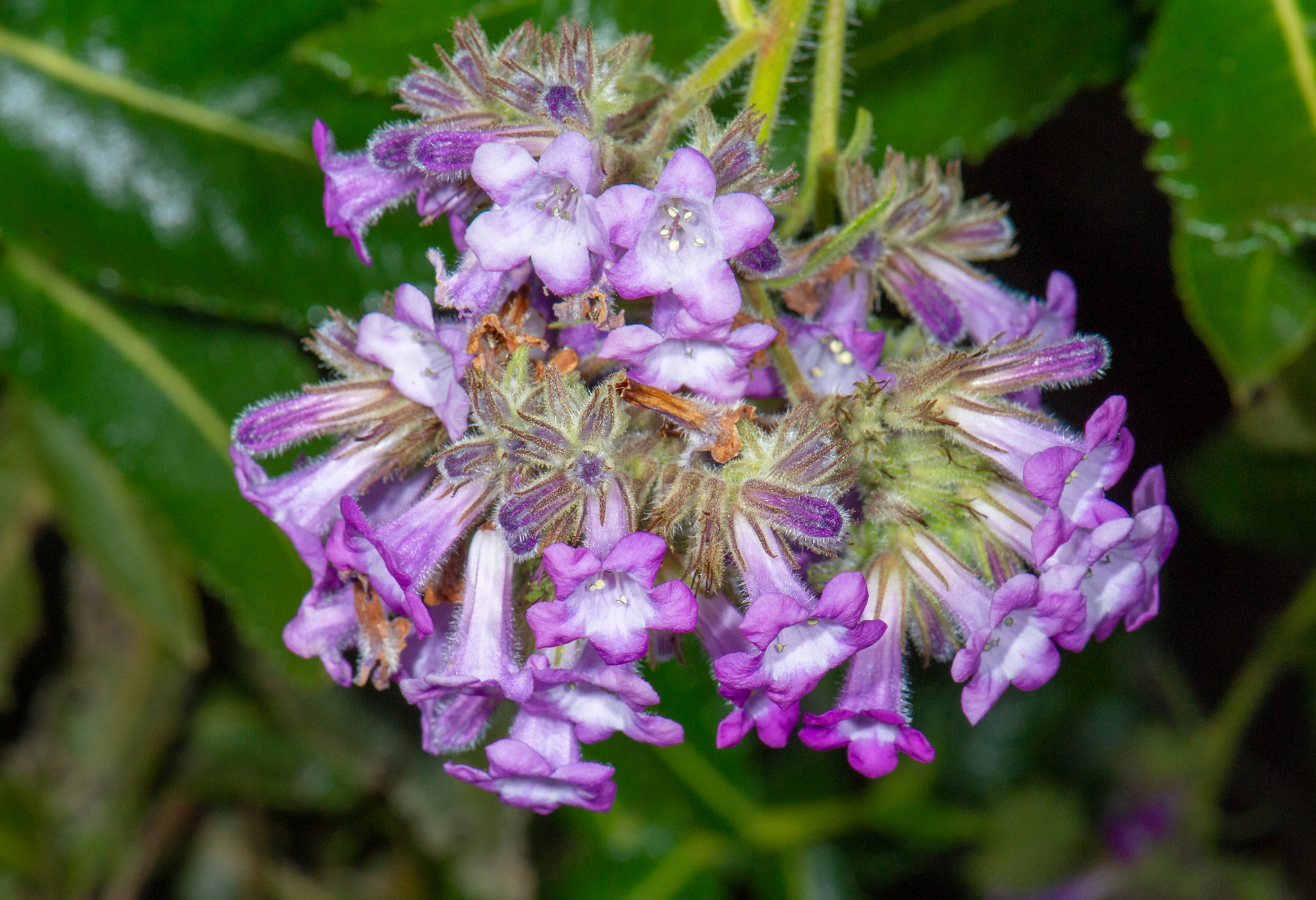

Scientific classification
- Kingdom: Plantae
- Clade: Tracheophytes
- Clade: Angiosperms
- Clade: Eudicots
- Clade: Asterids
- Order: Boraginales
- Family: Namaceae
- Genus: Eriodictyon
- Species: E. sessilifolium

Binomial name
- Eriodictyon sessilifolium Greene, 1885

= Eriodictyon sessilifolium =

Baja California yerba santa

Species of plant

Eriodictyon sessilifolium, known by the common names Baja California yerba santa, sessile-leaved yerba santa or sessileleaf yerba santa is a perennial shrub in the family Namaceae family, near-endemic to Baja California but also rarely found in the southern California, in a locality near Poway.

== Description ==
This species grows in a perennial shrub habit. The stem is 1 to 3 m. Leaves are sessile, with the blade 6 to 12 cm, 2 to 5 cm wide, shaped oblanceolate to oblong, coarse-toothed. The upper surface of the leaves are sparse to coarse-hairy, while the bottom face is sparsely to moderately coarse-hairy on the veins, stalked-glandular on all veins, with short hairs between veins. The margin is slightly rolled under between the teeth. The peduncle and pedicel are hirsute. The flower is mostly coarse-hairy throughout, including on the filaments and ovaries. The calyx lobes of the flower are 5 mm, while the corolla is 12 to 15 mm long, funnel shaped, and colored lilac purple. The fruits are 5 mm large, and also coarse-hairy. The chromosome count is n=14. Flowering is from April to June.

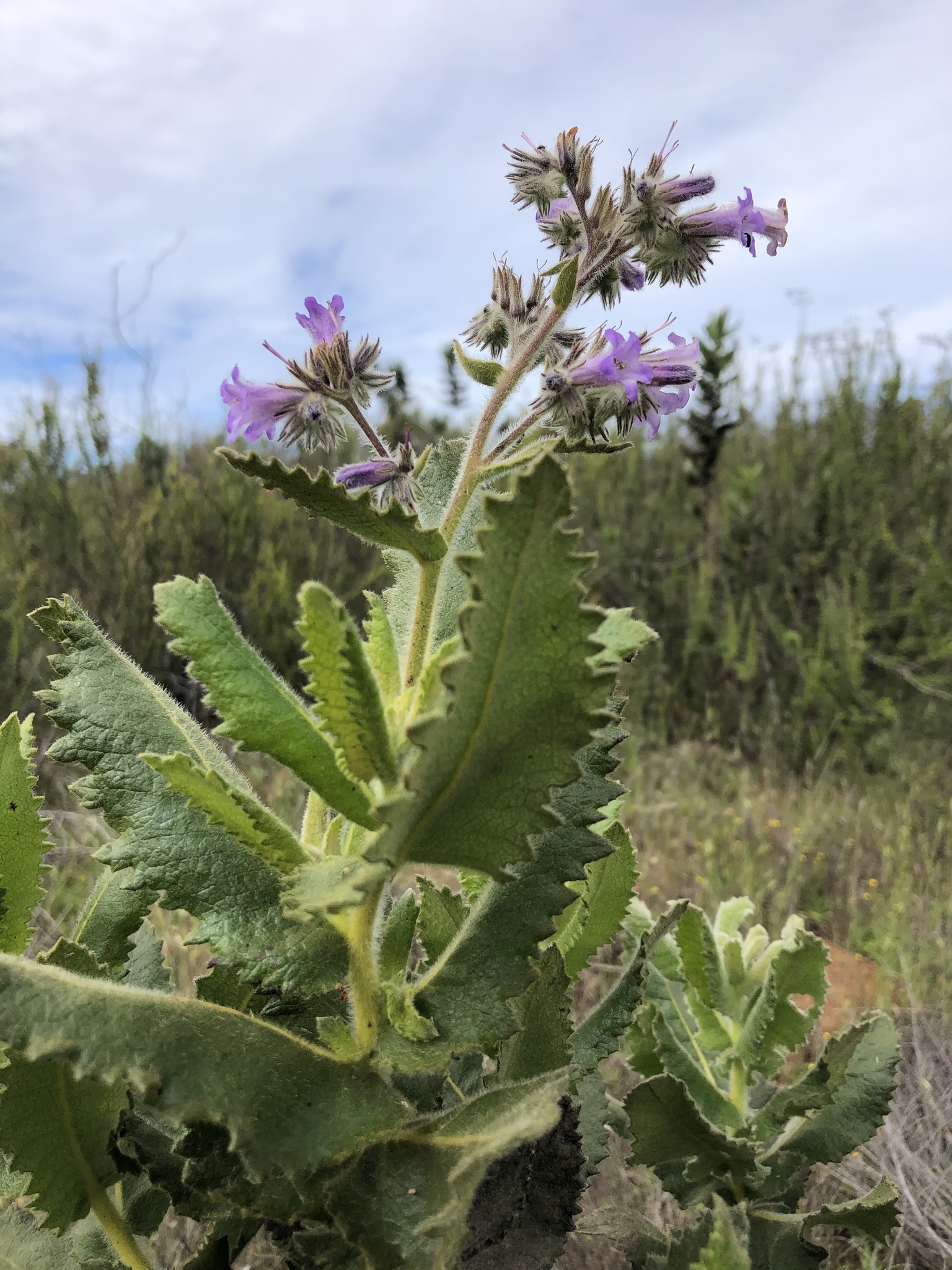
Detail of the leaves and inflorescence.

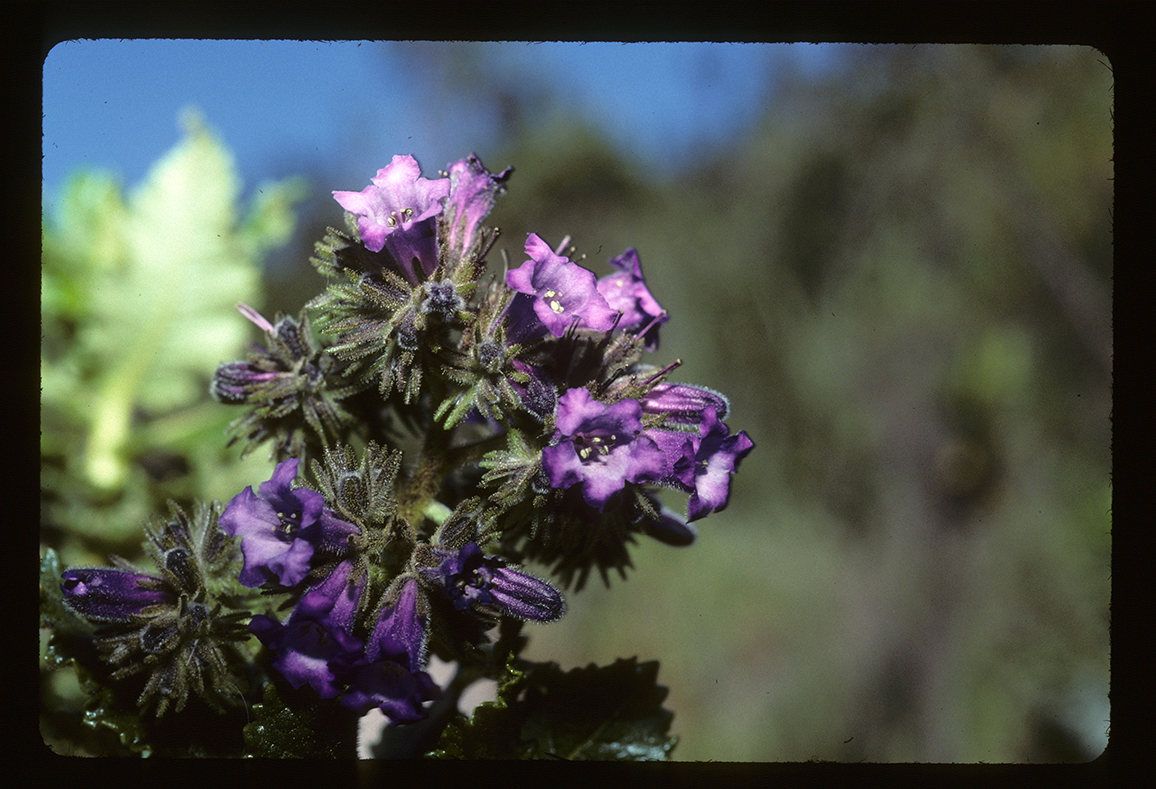
Detail of inflorescence.

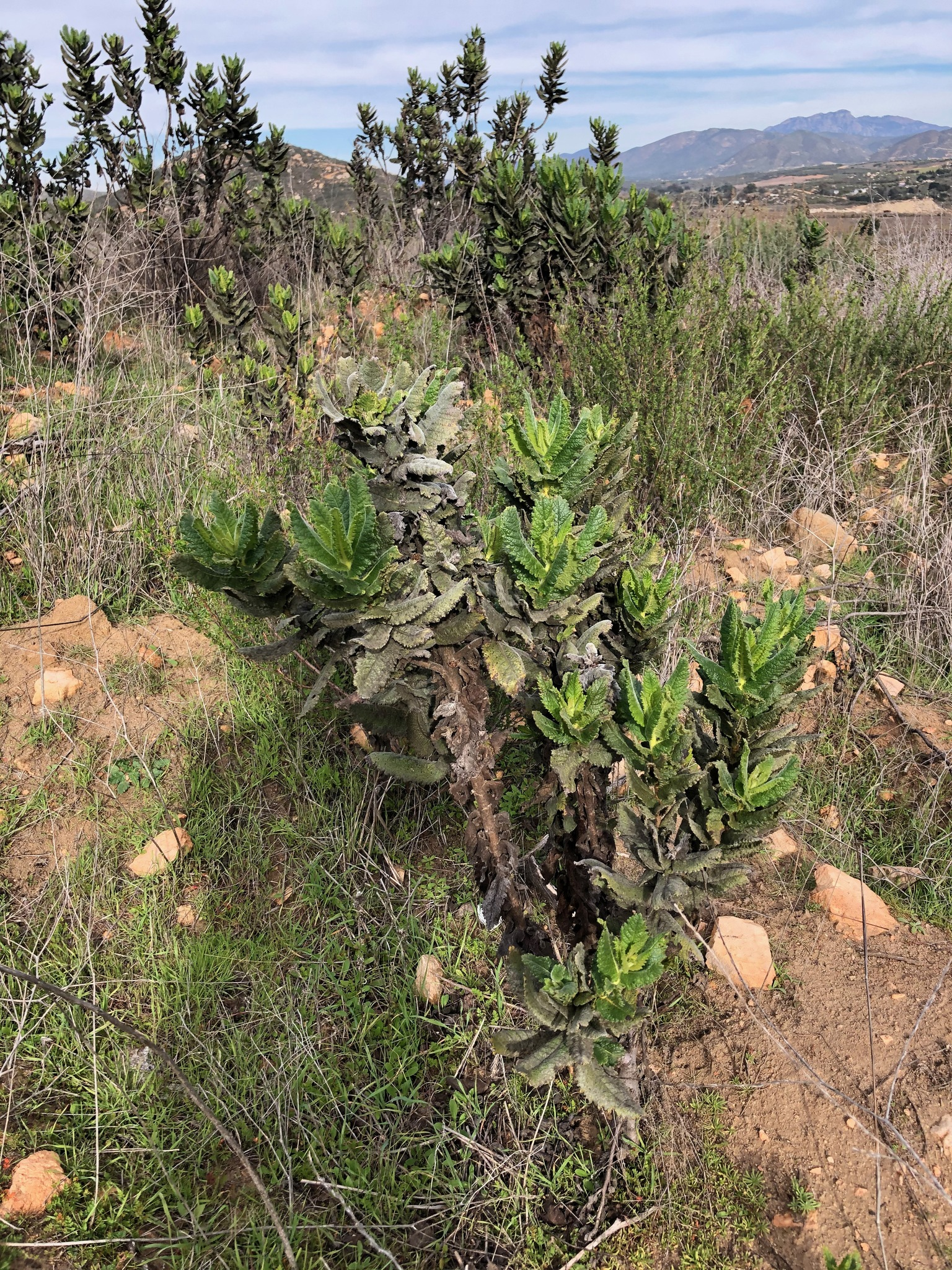
In habitat near Ensenada.

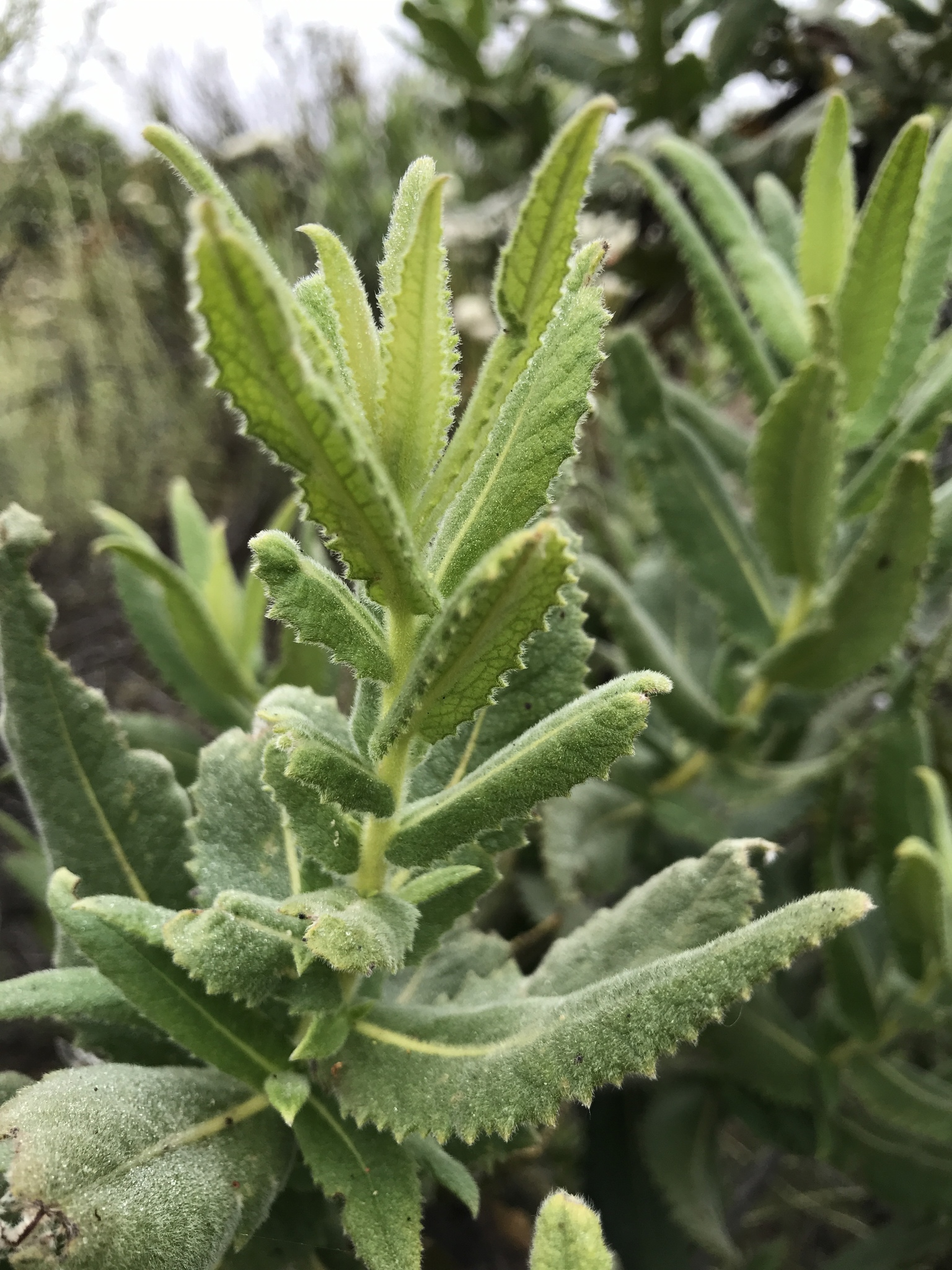
Note the sessile leaves.

== Distribution and habitat ==
This plant is mostly found in Baja California, from Ensenada south to San Quintin. An occurrence was found in 2015 near Poway, California, growing on Santiago Peak metavolcanics.

The plant grows on slopes, ridges, and ravines, along with disturbed areas, grassland, and chaparral. It is found from an elevation of 25 to 880 meters.
