= Butin (molecule) =

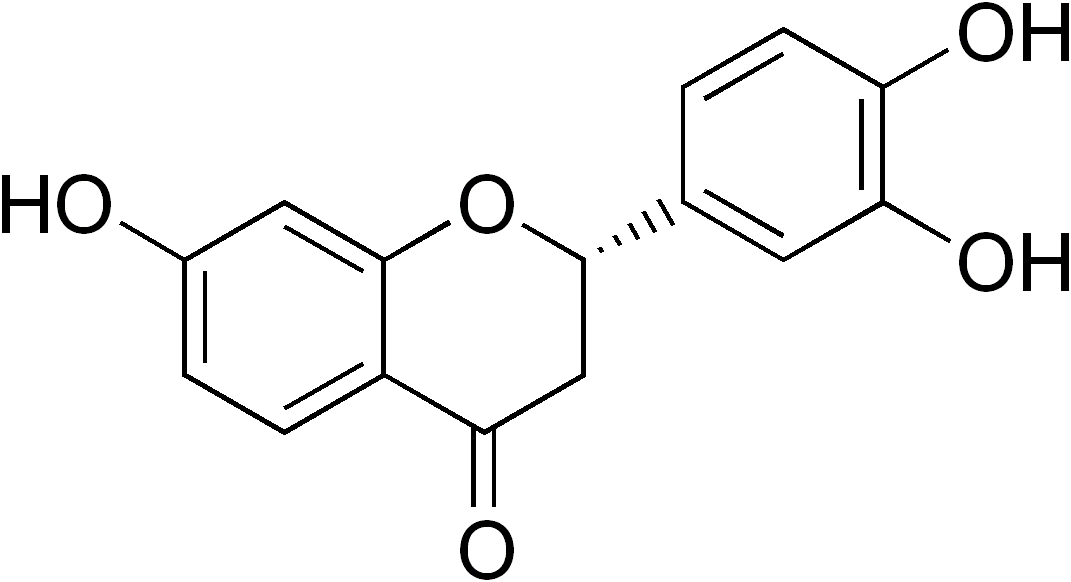

Names
- IUPAC name (2S)-3′,4′,7-Trihydroxyflavan-4-one
- Systematic IUPAC name (2S)-2-(3,4-Dihydroxyphenyl)-7-hydroxy-4H-1-benzopyran-4-one
- Other names 5-Deoxyeriodictyol

Identifiers
CAS Number	492-14-8
3D model (JSmol)	Interactive image; Interactive image
ChEBI	CHEBI:27725
ChEMBL	ChEMBL451168
ChemSpider	83750
KEGG	C09614
PubChem CID	92775
UNII	S23T8BI9DD
CompTox Dashboard (EPA)	DTXSID60197708
- InChI: InChI=1S/C15H12O5/c16-9-2-3-10-12(18)7-14(20-15(10)6-9)8-1-4-11(17)13(19)5-8/h1-6,14,16-17,19H,7H2/t14-/m0/s1 Key: MJBPUQUGJNAPAZ-AWEZNQCLSA-N; InChI=1/C15H12O5/c16-9-2-3-10-12(18)7-14(20-15(10)6-9)8-1-4-11(17)13(19)5-8/h1-6,14,16-17,19H,7H2/t14-/m0/s1 Key: MJBPUQUGJNAPAZ-AWEZNQCLBW
- SMILES: C1C(OC2=C(C1=O)C=CC(=C2)O)C3=CC(=C(C=C3)O)OC1[C@H](OC2=C(C1=O)C=CC(=C2)O)C3=CC(=C(C=C3)O)O; O=C2c3c(O[C@H](c1ccc(O)c(O)c1)C2)cc(O)cc3

Properties
Chemical formula	C_{15}H_{12}O_{5}
Molar mass	272.256 g·mol^{−1}
Density	1.485 g/mL
- Except where otherwise noted, data are given for materials in their standard state (at 25 °C [77 °F], 100 kPa). verify (what is ?) Infobox references

Butin is a flavanone, a type of flavonoid. The compound can be found in the seeds of Vernonia anthelmintica (Asteraceae) and in the wood of Dalbergia odorifera (Fabaceae).

== Glycosides ==
- Butin 7-O-β-D-glucopyranoside is found in Bidens tripartita (Asteraceae).
