= Myricetin 3-O-rutinoside =

- Myricetin 3-O-rutinoside structure

Names
- IUPAC names Myricetin rutinoside Myricetin 3-O-rhamnosyl-glucoside
- Other names Myricetin rutinoside

Identifiers
3D model (JSmol)	Interactive image
ChEMBL	ChEMBL3918733
ChemSpider	24845112
PubChem CID	44259428
CompTox Dashboard (EPA)	DTXSID001336212
- InChI: InChI=1S/C27H30O17/c1-7-16(32)20(36)22(38)26(41-7)40-6-14-18(34)21(37)23(39)27(43-14)44-25-19(35)15-10(29)4-9(28)5-13(15)42-24(25)8-2-11(30)17(33)12(31)3-8/h2-5,7,14,16,18,20-23,26-34,36-39H,6H2,1H3/t7?,14?,16-,18+,20-,21?,22?,23?,26+,27-/m0/s1 Key: QCIILLDRJZPUDI-HSGFTUQLSA-N
- SMILES: CC1[C@@H]([C@@H](C([C@@H](O1)OCC2[C@H](C(C([C@@H](O2)OC3=C(OC4=CC(=CC(=C4C3=O)O)O)C5=CC(=C(C(=C5)O)O)O)O)O)O)O)O)O

Properties
Chemical formula	C_{27}H_{30}O_{17}
Molar mass	626.51 g/mol
- Except where otherwise noted, data are given for materials in their standard state (at 25 °C [77 °F], 100 kPa). verify (what is ?) Infobox references

Myricetin 3-O-rutinoside (or Myricetin 3-rutinoside) is a chemical compound. It can be isolated in Chrysobalanus icaco and in fruits (blackcurrant: 3.14 mg/100 g, greencurrant: 0.78 mg/100 g).
