= Rhoifolin =

- Rhoifolin structure

Names
- IUPAC name 4′,5-Dihydroxy-7-[α-L-rhamnopyranosyl-(1→2)-β-D-glucopyranosyloxy]flavone
- Systematic IUPAC name 7-{[(2S,3R,4S,5S,6R)-4,5-Dihydroxy-6-(hydroxymethyl)-3-{[(2S,3R,4R,5R,6S)-3,4,5-trihydroxy-6-methyloxan-2-yl]oxy}oxan-2-yl]oxy}-5-hydroxy-2-(4-hydroxyphenyl)-4H-1-benzopyran-4-one
- Other names Apigenin 7-O-neohesperidoside

Identifiers
CAS Number	17306-46-6
3D model (JSmol)	Interactive image
ChEBI	CHEBI:31227
ChEMBL	ChEMBL395990
ChemSpider	4445347
ECHA InfoCard	100.037.562
KEGG	C12627
PubChem CID	5282150
UNII	K86F9AKS2A
CompTox Dashboard (EPA)	DTXSID10938284
- InChI: InChI=1S/C27H30O14/c1-10-20(32)22(34)24(36)26(37-10)41-25-23(35)21(33)18(9-28)40-27(25)38-13-6-14(30)19-15(31)8-16(39-17(19)7-13)11-2-4-12(29)5-3-11/h2-8,10,18,20-30,32-36H,9H2,1H3/t10-,18+,20-,21+,22+,23-,24+,25+,26-,27+/m0/s1 Key: RPMNUQRUHXIGHK-PYXJVEIZSA-N
- SMILES: O=C\4c5c(O)cc(O[C@@H]2O[C@H](CO)[C@@H](O)[C@H](O)[C@H]2O[C@@H]1O[C@H]([C@H](O)[C@@H](O)[C@H]1O)C)cc5O/C(c3ccc(O)cc3)=C/4

Properties
Chemical formula	C_{27}H_{30}O_{14}
Molar mass	578.52 g/mol
- Except where otherwise noted, data are given for materials in their standard state (at 25 °C [77 °F], 100 kPa). verify (what is ?) Infobox references

Rhoifolin is a chemical compound. It is first isolated from plant Rhus succedanea. The term "Rhoi" derived from generic name of plant Rhus. It is a flavone, a type of flavonoid isolated from Boehmeria nivea, China grass or ramie (leaf), from Citrus limon, Canton lemon (leaf), from Citrus x aurantium, the bigarade or bitter orange (plant), from Citrus x paradisi, the grapefruit (leaf), from Ononis campestris, the cammock (shoot) and from Sabal serratula, the serenoa or sabal fruit (plant).
