= Flavan-4-ol =

- Chemical structure of flavan-4-ol

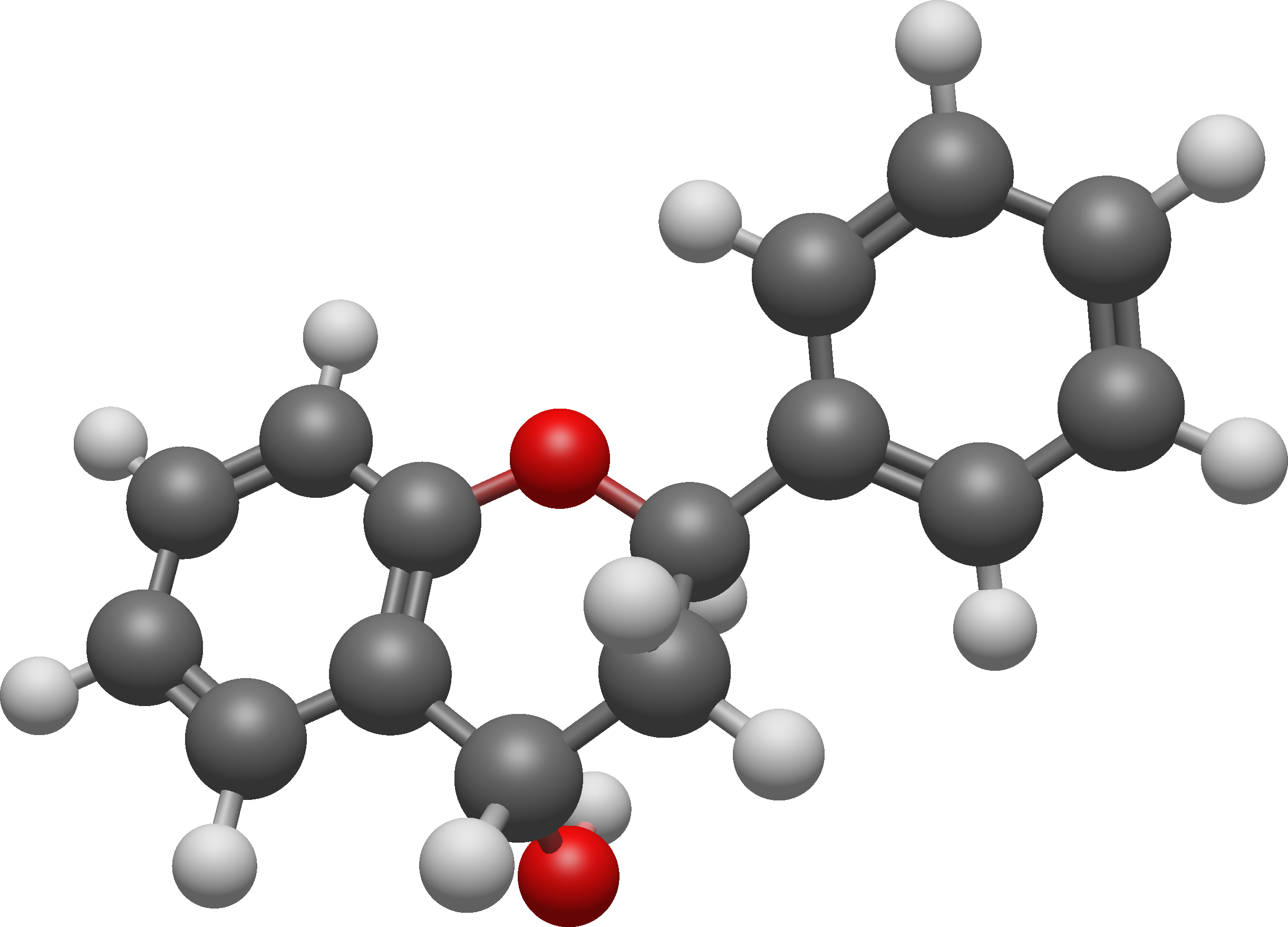
- Chemical structure of flavan-4-ol in ball-and-stick model

Names
- IUPAC name Flavan-4-ol
- Systematic IUPAC name 2-Phenyl-3,4-dihydro-2H-1-benzopyran-4-ol
- Other names 2-Phenylchroman-4-ol

Identifiers
CAS Number	487-25-2
3D model (JSmol)	Interactive image
ChemSpider	222586
PubChem CID	253959
- InChI: InChI=1S/C15H14O2/c16-13-10-15(11-6-2-1-3-7-11)17-14-9-5-4-8-12(13)14/h1-9,13,15-16H,10H2 Key: YTMFRMLVZQOBDR-UHFFFAOYSA-N
- SMILES: C1C(C2=CC=CC=C2OC1C3=CC=CC=C3)O

Properties
Chemical formula	C_{15}H_{14}O_{2}
Molar mass	226.275 g·mol^{−1}
- Except where otherwise noted, data are given for materials in their standard state (at 25 °C [77 °F], 100 kPa). verify (what is ?) Infobox references

The flavan-4-ols (3-deoxyflavonoids) are flavone-derived alcohols and a family of flavonoids. Flavan-4-ols are colorless precursor compounds that polymerize to form red phlobaphene pigments. They can be found in the sorghum. Glycosides (abacopterins A, B, C and D, together with triphyllin A and 6,8-dimethyl-7-hydroxy-4‘-methoxyanthocyanidin-5-O-β-d-glucopyranoside) can be isolated from a methanol extract of the rhizomes of Abacopteris penangiana.

== Known flavan-4-ols ==
- Apiforol
- Luteoforol

== Metabolism ==
Flavanone 4-reductase is an enzyme that uses (2S)-flavan-4-ol and NADP^{+} to produce (2S)-flavanone, NADPH, and H^{+}.

== Spectral data ==
These compounds have absorption maxima of 564 nm.
