= Naringenin 7-O-methyltransferase =

Class of enzymes

Identifiers
- EC no.: 2.1.1.232

Databases
- IntEnz: IntEnz view
- BRENDA: BRENDA entry
- ExPASy: NiceZyme view
- KEGG: KEGG entry
- MetaCyc: metabolic pathway
- PRIAM: profile
- PDB structures: RCSB PDB PDBe PDBsum
Search
- PMC: articles
- PubMed: articles
- NCBI: proteins

Naringenin 7-O-methyltransferase (EC 2.1.1.232, NOMT) (full systematic name S-adenosyl-L-methionine:(2S)-5,7,4'-trihydroxyflavanone 7-O-methyltransferase) is a methyltransferase isolated from rice, which catalyzes the final step in the biosynthesis of sakuranetin from naringenin. The chemical reaction is:

naringenin
+ SAM
sakuranetin
+ SAH

This is a methylation reaction in which the methyl group comes from the cofactor, S-adenosyl methionine (SAM), which becomes S-adenosyl-L-homocysteine (SAH). The enzyme was characterised from Oryza sativa. While the enzyme is not present in healthy rice leaves, it can be induced by treatment with ultraviolet radiation, jasmonic acid and copper chloride.
