= Sakuranetin =

- Sakuranetin

Names
- IUPAC name (2S)-4′,5-Dihydroxy-7-methoxyflavan-4-one
- Systematic IUPAC name (2S)-5-Hydroxy-2-(4-hydroxyphenyl)-7-methoxy-2,3-dihydro-4H-1-benzopyran-4-one
- Other names Naringenin 7-methyl ether

Identifiers
CAS Number	2957-21-3
3D model (JSmol)	Interactive image
ChEBI	CHEBI:28927
ChEMBL	ChEMBL448297
ChemSpider	66249
ECHA InfoCard	100.019.073
IUPHAR/BPS	412
PubChem CID	73571
UNII	3O38P61299
CompTox Dashboard (EPA)	DTXSID10874774
- InChI: InChI=1S/C16H14O5/c1-20-11-6-12(18)16-13(19)8-14(21-15(16)7-11)9-2-4-10(17)5-3-9/h2-7,14,17-18H,8H2,1H3/t14-/m0/s1 Key: DJOJDHGQRNZXQQ-AWEZNQCLSA-N
- SMILES: COC1=CC(=C2C(=O)CC(OC2=C1)C3=CC=C(C=C3)O)O

Properties
Chemical formula	C_{16}H_{14}O_{5}
Molar mass	286.27 g/mol
- Except where otherwise noted, data are given for materials in their standard state (at 25 °C [77 °F], 100 kPa). Infobox references

Sakuranetin is a flavan-on, the 7-methoxy derivative of naringenin, found in Polymnia fruticosa and rice, where it acts as a phytoalexin against spore germination of Pyricularia oryzae.

== Glycosides ==
Sakuranin is the 5-O-glucoside of sakuranetin.

== Metabolism ==
biosynthesis

Naringenin 7-O-methyltransferase uses naringenin to yield sakuranetin, with S-adenosyl-methionine (SAM) as the methyl donor.

naringenin
+ SAM
sakuranetin
+ SAH

biodegradation

In compounds like 7-methoxylated flavanones like sakuranetin, demethylation followed by sulfation occur in model organism Cunninghamella elegans.
