= Eriodictyon traskiae =

Scientific classification
- Kingdom: Plantae
- Clade: Tracheophytes
- Clade: Angiosperms
- Clade: Eudicots
- Clade: Asterids
- Order: Boraginales
- Family: Namaceae
- Genus: Eriodictyon
- Species: E. traskiae

Binomial name
- Eriodictyon traskiae Eastw.

Species of flowering plant

Eriodictyon traskiae is a species of flowering plant in the family Namaceae family known by the common names Pacific yerba santa and Trask's yerba santa.

== Description ==
Eriodictyon traskiae approaches a maximum height of two meters. Its twigs and foliage are covered in a dense coat of white woolly hairs, giving the bush a gray-green look. The leaves are oval and anywhere from 3 to 14 centimeters long and 1 to 7 wide. They are woolly and crinkled and the edges roll under, and they may have small teeth. The bush flowers in dense fuzzy bunches of white to brownish-purple glandular blossoms, each under a centimeter wide. The fruit is a tiny capsule up to three millimeters wide containing two to four minute seeds.

== Distribution ==
This shrub is endemic to California, where it grows on the chaparral slopes of the central Coast Ranges and Southern California Transverse Ranges.
