= Sterubin =

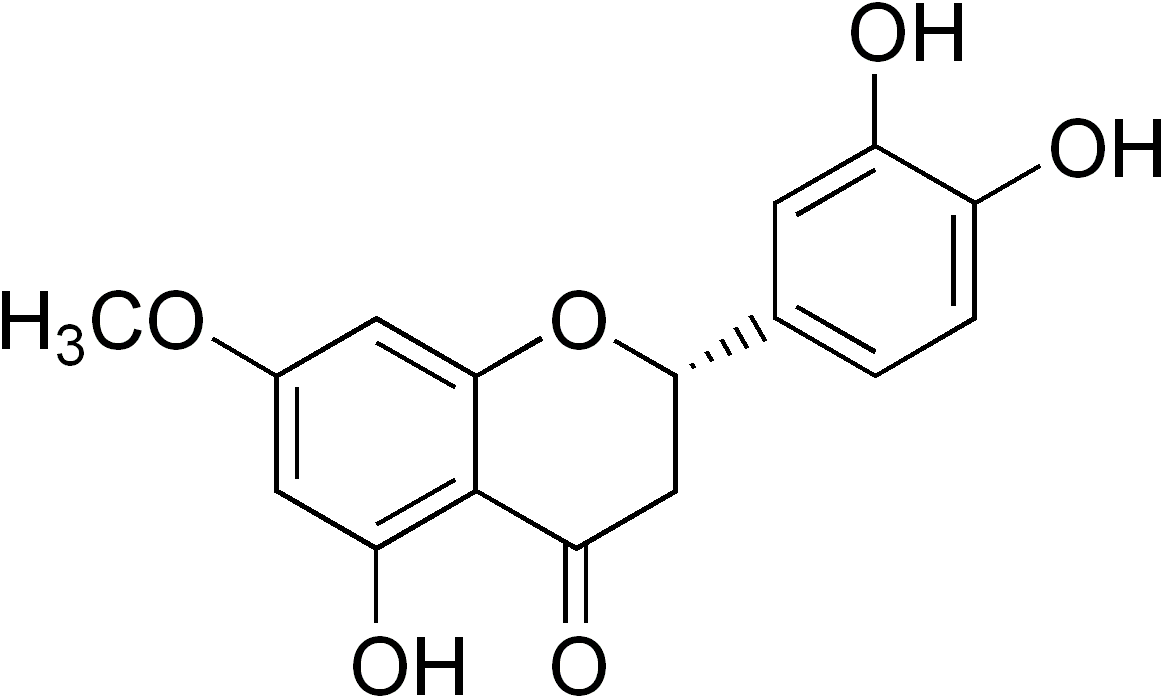

Names
- IUPAC name (2S)-3′,4′,5-Trihydroxy-7-methoxyflavan-4-one
- Systematic IUPAC name (2S)-2-(3,4-Dihydroxyphenyl)-5-hydroxy-7-methoxy-2,3-dihydro-4H-1-benzopyran-4-one
- Other names 7-Methoxy-3′,4′,5-trihydroxyflavanone

Identifiers
CAS Number	51857-11-5
3D model (JSmol)	Interactive image
ChemSpider	1064932
PubChem CID	1268276
UNII	0IT00NY6AC
CompTox Dashboard (EPA)	DTXSID70199819
- InChI: InChI=1S/C16H14O6/c1-21-9-5-12(19)16-13(20)7-14(22-15(16)6-9)8-2-3-10(17)11(18)4-8/h2-6,14,17-19H,7H2,1H3/t14-/m0/s1 Key: DSAJORLEPQBKDA-AWEZNQCLSA-N; InChI=1/C16H14O6/c1-21-9-5-12(19)16-13(20)7-14(22-15(16)6-9)8-2-3-10(17)11(18)4-8/h2-6,14,17-19H,7H2,1H3/t14-/m0/s1 Key: DSAJORLEPQBKDA-AWEZNQCLBS
- SMILES: O=C2c3c(O[C@H](c1ccc(O)c(O)c1)C2)cc(OC)cc3O

Properties
Chemical formula	C_{16}H_{14}O_{6}
Molar mass	302.28 g/mol
Density	1.458 g/mL
- Except where otherwise noted, data are given for materials in their standard state (at 25 °C [77 °F], 100 kPa). verify (what is ?) Infobox references

Sterubin (7-methoxy-3',4',5-trihydroxyflavanone) is a bitter-masking flavanone extracted from Yerba Santa (Eriodictyon californicum) a plant native to western and southwestern North America.

Sterubin is one of the four flavanones identified by Symrise in this plant which elicit taste-modifying properties. The others are homoeriodictyol, its sodium salt, and eriodictyol.

Recent research has demonstrated some neuroprotective properties of Sterubin in vitro, but more research is needed before it can be considered a true drug candidate.
