= Homoeriodictyol =

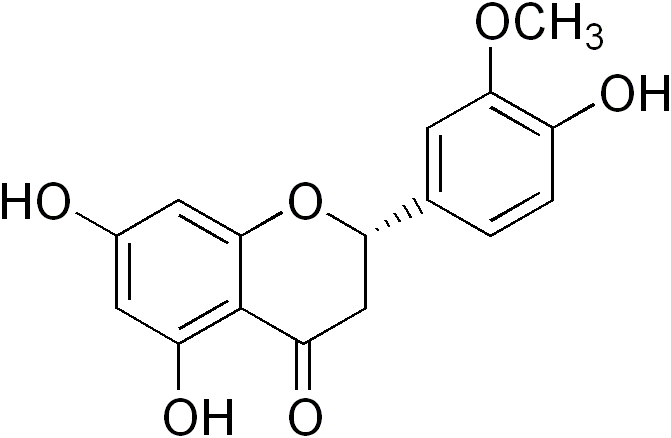

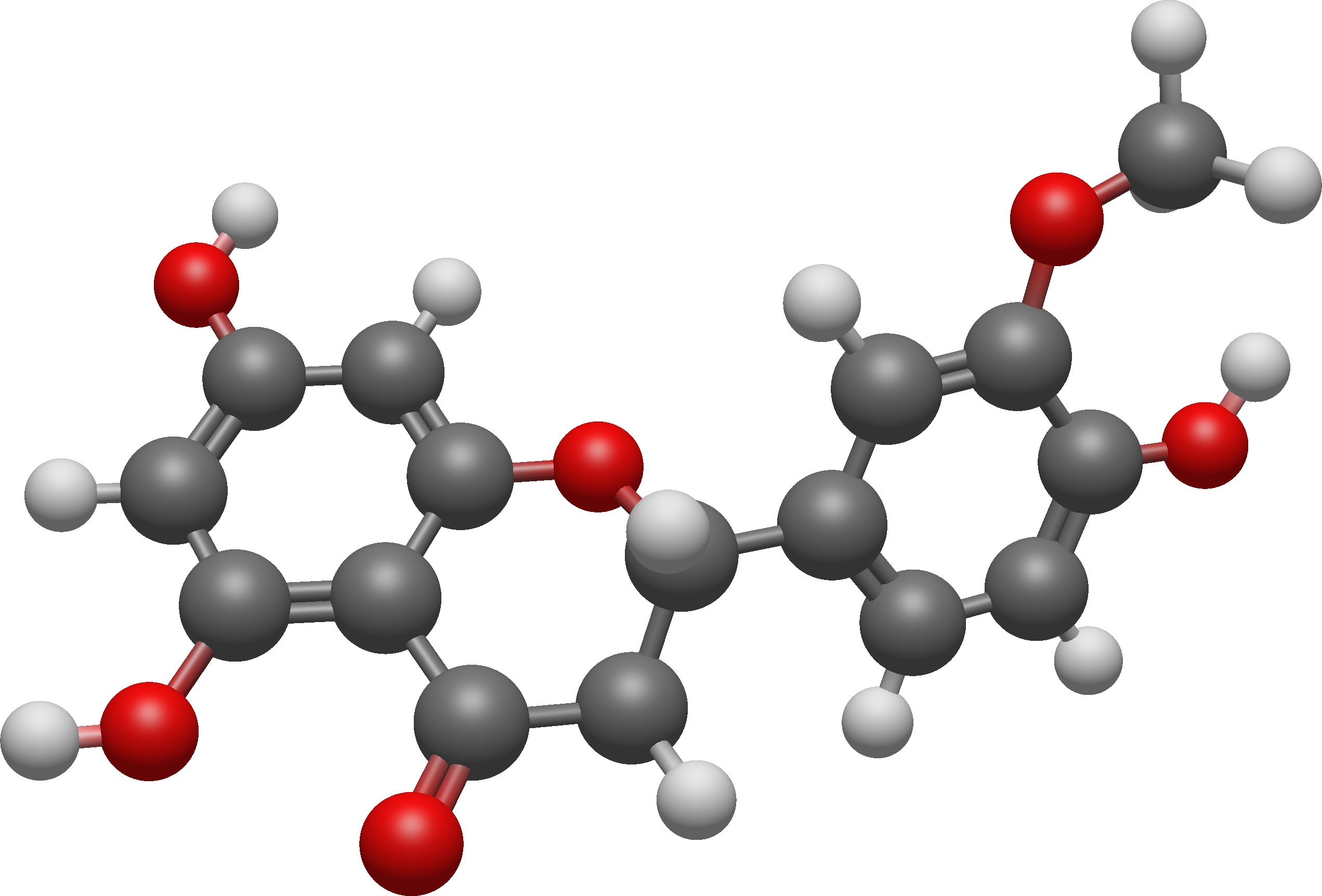

Names
- IUPAC name (2S)-4′,5,7-Trihydroxy-3′-methoxyflavan-4-one
- Systematic IUPAC name (2S)-5,7-Dihydroxy-2-(4-hydroxy-3-methoxyphenyl)-2,3-dihydro-4H-1-benzopyran-4-one

Identifiers
CAS Number	446-71-9
3D model (JSmol)	Interactive image
ChEMBL	ChEMBL490170
ChemSpider	66296
ECHA InfoCard	100.006.523
PubChem CID	73635
UNII	EHE7H3705C
CompTox Dashboard (EPA)	DTXSID30196243
- InChI: InChI=1S/C16H14O6/c1-21-14-4-8(2-3-10(14)18)13-7-12(20)16-11(19)5-9(17)6-15(16)22-13/h2-6,13,17-19H,7H2,1H3/t13-/m0/s1 Key: FTODBIPDTXRIGS-ZDUSSCGKSA-N; InChI=1/C16H14O6/c1-21-14-4-8(2-3-10(14)18)13-7-12(20)16-11(19)5-9(17)6-15(16)22-13/h2-6,13,17-19H,7H2,1H3/t13-/m0/s1 Key: FTODBIPDTXRIGS-ZDUSSCGKBL
- SMILES: COC1=C(C=CC(=C1)[C@@H]2CC(=O)C3=C(C=C(C=C3O2)O)O)O

Properties
Chemical formula	C_{16}H_{14}O_{6}
Molar mass	302.27876
- Except where otherwise noted, data are given for materials in their standard state (at 25 °C [77 °F], 100 kPa). verify (what is ?) Infobox references

Homoeriodictyol is a bitter-masking flavanone extracted from Yerba Santa (Eriodictyon californicum) a plant growing in America.

Homoeriodictyol (3`-methoxy-4`,5,7-trihydroxyflavanone) is one of the 4 flavanones identified by Symrise in this plant eliciting taste-modifying property: homoeriodictyol sodium salt, eriodictyol and sterubin. Homoeriodictyol Sodium salt elicited the most potent bitter-masking activity by reducing from 10 to 40% the bitterness of salicin, amarogentin, paracetamol and quinine. However no bitter-masking activity was detected with bitter linoleic acid emulsions. According to Symrise's scientists homoeriodictyol sodium salt seems to be a taste-modifier with large potential in food applications and pharmaceuticals.

Structural relatives investigation based on eriodictyol and homoeriodictyol, found 2,4-Dihydroxybenzoic acid vanillylamide to elicits bitter-masking activity. At 0.1g/L, this vanillin derivative, was able to reduce the bitterness of a 0.5g/L caffeine solution by about 30%.
