= Dihydrokaempferide =

Names
- IUPAC name 3,5,7-trihydroxy-2-(4-methoxyphenyl)-2,3-dihydrochromen-4-one

Identifiers
CAS Number	3570-69-2
3D model (JSmol)	Interactive image
ChemSpider	10305947
PubChem CID	586387
UNII	9V3SE2M92C
CompTox Dashboard (EPA)	DTXSID60929743
- InChI: InChI=1S/C16H14O6/c1-21-10-4-2-8(3-5-10)16-15(20)14(19)13-11(18)6-9(17)7-12(13)22-16/h2-7,15-18,20H,1H3/t15-,16+/m0/s1 Key: CKDYDMSDCNQHEB-JKSUJKDBSA-N
- SMILES: COc1ccc(cc1)[C@@H]2[C@H](C(=O)c3c(cc(cc3O2)O)O)O

Properties
Chemical formula	C_{16}H_{14}O_{6}
Molar mass	302.27 g/mol
- Except where otherwise noted, data are given for materials in their standard state (at 25 °C [77 °F], 100 kPa). verify (what is ?) Infobox references

Dihydrokaempferide is a flavanonol, a type of flavonoid. It can be found in Prunus domestica (plum tree), in the wood of Salix caprea (goat willow) and in the Brazilian green propolis.
