= Blumeatin =

Names
- IUPAC name (2S)-3′,5,5′-Trihydroxy-7-methoxyflavan-4-one
- Systematic IUPAC name (2S)-2-(3,5-Dihydroxyphenyl)-5-hydroxy-7-methoxy-2,3-dihydro-4H-1-benzopyran-4-one

Identifiers
CAS Number	118024-26-3
3D model (JSmol)	Interactive image
ChEMBL	ChEMBL2037158
ChemSpider	27445003
PubChem CID	70696494
UNII	FYN981DTL9
CompTox Dashboard (EPA)	DTXSID001318666
- InChI: InChI=1S/C16H14O6/c1-21-11-5-12(19)16-13(20)7-14(22-15(16)6-11)8-2-9(17)4-10(18)3-8/h2-6,14,17-19H,7H2,1H3/t14-/m0/s1 Key: YEYLMQKEGSQNGZ-AWEZNQCLSA-N
- SMILES: COC1=CC(=C2C(=O)CC(OC2=C1)C3=CC(=CC(=C3)O)O)O

Properties
Chemical formula	C_{16}H_{14}O_{6}
Molar mass	302.282 g·mol^{−1}
- Except where otherwise noted, data are given for materials in their standard state (at 25 °C [77 °F], 100 kPa). Infobox references

Blumeatin is a flavanone found in Blumea balsamifera, and has been reported to be present in Artemisia annua.

== Structure ==
Blumeatin has the skeleton structure of a flavanone with three hydroxy groups at 5, 3' and 5' carbon positions and a methoxy group at the 7 carbon position.
