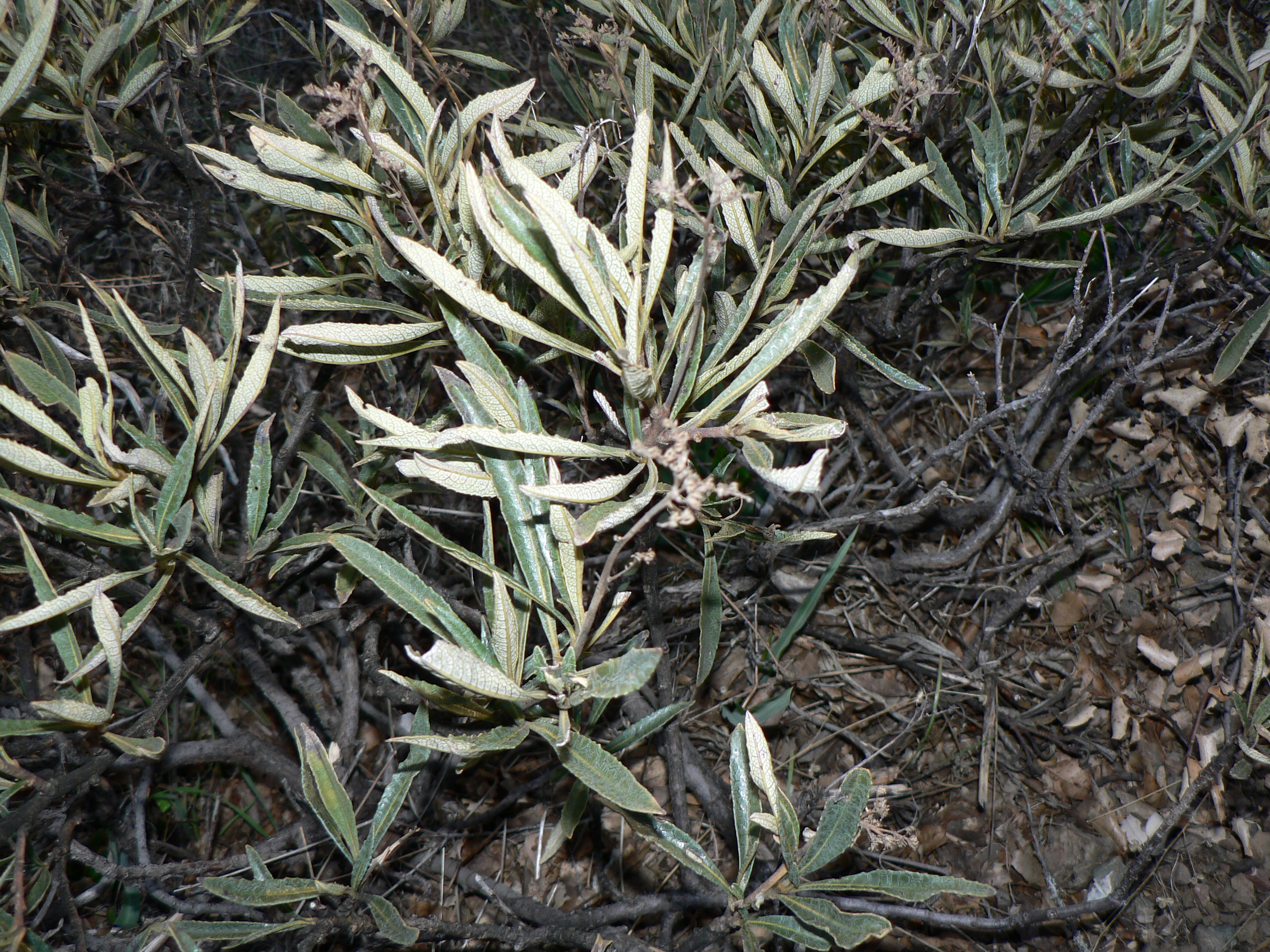
- Eriodictyon californicum

Scientific classification
- Kingdom: Plantae
- Clade: Tracheophytes
- Clade: Angiosperms
- Clade: Eudicots
- Clade: Asterids
- Order: Boraginales
- Family: Namaceae
- Genus: Eriodictyon; Benth.

Species
- see text

= Eriodictyon =

Genus of flowering plants

Eriodictyon is a genus of plants known by the common name yerba santa within the family Namaceae. They are distributed throughout the southwestern United States and Mexico.

== Description ==
Most species grow as either perennial herbs or shrubs. They grow in a prostrate to ascending or erect stance. The stems are characterized by shredding barking. The leaves are cauline and alternate. The inflorescence is generally open and terminal. The corolla is funnel to urn shaped, and white, lavender or purple, and generally hairy on the abaxial surface. The sexual organs of the plant, including the stamens, filaments, and ovaries, are also generally hairy. The fruits are 1 to 3 mm wide. The fruits are schizocarpic, and not all mericarpids are fertile. The seeds are striated, and colored a dark brown or black.

== Taxonomy ==
=== Etymology ===
It includes California yerba santa (Eriodictyon californica), along with other similarly named plants. Yerba santa means "sacred herb" in the Spanish language. The name Eriodictyon, from the Greek erio + dictyon refers to the wooly surface of the abaxial leaves.

=== Species ===
As of April 2026, Plants of the World Online accepted 10 species native to the southwestern United States and northwestern Mexico. Six species are used by indigenous peoples.

- Eriodictyon altissimum — Indian Knob mountainbalm
- Eriodictyon angustifolium — Narrow-leaved yerba santa
- Eriodictyon californicum — California yerba santa
- Eriodictyon capitatum — Lompoc yerba santa
- Eriodictyon crassifolium — Thick-leaved yerba santa
- Eriodictyon parryi — Poodle-dog bush
- Eriodictyon sessilifolium — Baja California yerba santa
- Eriodictyon tomentosum — Woolly yerba santa
- Eriodictyon traskiae — Pacific yerba santa
- Eriodictyon trichocalyx — Hairy yerba santa
