= Quercetin 3,4'-diglucoside =

Names
- IUPAC name 3,4′-Bis(β-D-glucopyranosyloxy)-3′,5,7-trihydroxyflavone
- Systematic IUPAC name 5,7-Dihydroxy-2-(3-hydroxy-4-{[(2S,3R,4S,5S,6R)-3,4,5-trihydroxy-6-(hydroxymethyl)oxan-2-yl]oxy}phenyl)-3-{[(2S,3R,4S,5S,6R)-3,4,5-trihydroxy-6-(hydroxymethyl)oxan-2-yl]oxy}-4H-1-benzopyran-4-one
- Other names Quercetin 3,4’-di-O-β-glucopyranoside; Quercetin-3,4'-O-di-beta-glucopyranoside

Identifiers
CAS Number	29125-80-2
3D model (JSmol)	Interactive image
ChEBI	CHEBI:131498
ChemSpider	4478806
PubChem CID	5320835
CompTox Dashboard (EPA)	DTXSID301045305
- InChI: InChI=1S/C27H30O17/c28-6-14-17(33)20(36)22(38)26(42-14)41-12-2-1-8(3-10(12)31)24-25(19(35)16-11(32)4-9(30)5-13(16)40-24)44-27-23(39)21(37)18(34)15(7-29)43-27/h1-5,14-15,17-18,20-23,26-34,36-39H,6-7H2/t14-,15-,17-,18-,20+,21+,22-,23-,26-,27+/m1/s1 Key: RPVIQWDFJPYNJM-DEFKTLOSSA-N
- SMILES: C1=CC(=C(C=C1C2=C(C(=O)C3=C(C=C(C=C3O2)O)O)OC4C(C(C(C(O4)CO)O)O)O)O)OC5C(C(C(C(O5)CO)O)O)O

Properties
Chemical formula	C_{27}H_{30}O_{17}
Molar mass	626.520 g·mol^{−1}
- Except where otherwise noted, data are given for materials in their standard state (at 25 °C [77 °F], 100 kPa). Infobox references

Quercetin 3,4'-diglucoside is a flavonol glycoside found in onions (Allium cepa) and in horse chestnut seeds (Aesculus hippocastanum).
