= Flavanone 4-reductase =

flavanone 4-reductase

Identifiers
- EC no.: 1.1.1.234
- CAS no.: 115232-53-6

Databases
- IntEnz: IntEnz view
- BRENDA: BRENDA entry
- ExPASy: NiceZyme view
- KEGG: KEGG entry
- MetaCyc: metabolic pathway
- PRIAM: profile
- PDB structures: RCSB PDB PDBe PDBsum
- Gene Ontology: AmiGO / QuickGO
Search
- PMC: articles
- PubMed: articles
- NCBI: proteins

In enzymology, a flavanone 4-reductase (EC 1.1.1.234) is an enzyme that catalyzes the chemical reaction

(2S)-flavan-4-ol + NADP^{+} $\rightleftharpoons$ (2S)-flavanone + NADPH + H^{+}

Thus, the two substrates of this enzyme are (2S)-flavan-4-ol and NADP^{+}, whereas its 3 products are (2S)-flavanone, NADPH, and H^{+}.

This enzyme belongs to the family of oxidoreductases, specifically those acting on the CH-OH group of donor with NAD^{+} or NADP^{+} as acceptor. The systematic name of this enzyme class is (2S)-flavan-4-ol:NADP^{+} 4-oxidoreductase. This enzyme participates in flavonoid biosynthesis.
