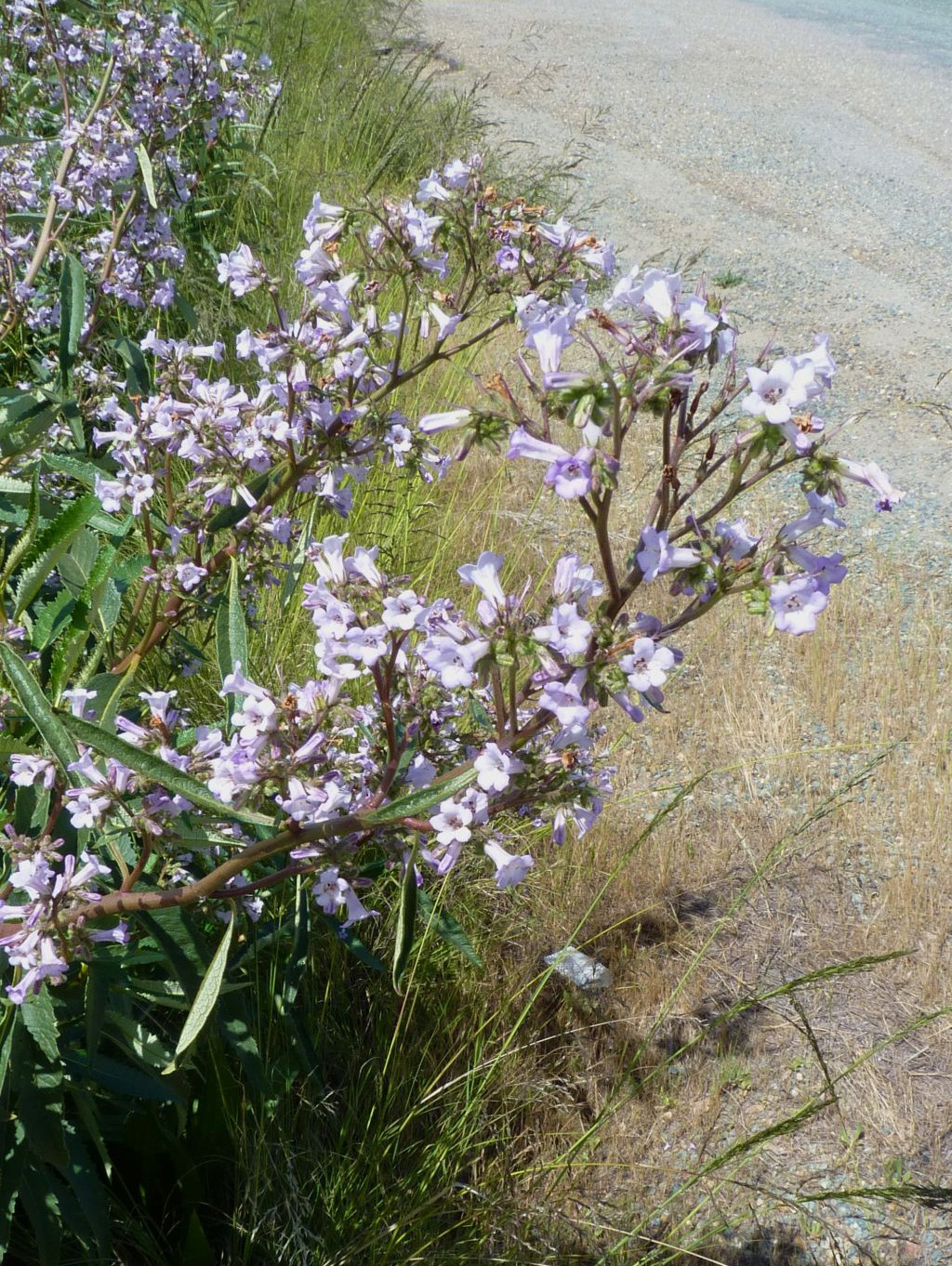

Conservation status
- Apparently Secure (NatureServe)

Scientific classification
- Kingdom: Plantae
- Clade: Tracheophytes
- Clade: Angiosperms
- Clade: Eudicots
- Clade: Asterids
- Order: Boraginales
- Family: Namaceae
- Genus: Eriodictyon
- Species: E. californicum

Binomial name
- Eriodictyon californicum (Hook. & Arn.) Torr.

Synonyms
- Wigandia californica Hook. & Arn. (basionym)

= Eriodictyon californicum =

Yerba santa

Species of flowering plant

Eriodictyon californicum, common name Yerba santa, is a species of plant in the family Namaceae. It is a perennial evergreen shrub native to California and Oregon.

== Description ==
Eriodictyon californicum is an evergreen aromatic shrub with woody rhizomes, typically found in clonal stands growing to a height of 3 to 4 feet (0.91 to 1.22 m). The dark green, leathery leaves are narrow, oblong to lanceolate, and up to 15 centimeters (5.9 in) in length. Foliage and twigs are covered with shiny resin and are often dusted with black fungi, Heterosporium californicum.

It is similar to its Southern California sibling E. crassofolium.

The shrub is known to be an occasional source of nutrition for wildlife and livestock. Their bitterness makes them unpalatable to most animals, although it does have multiple insect herbivores, including butterflies. The inflorescence is a cluster of bell-shaped white to purplish flowers, each between one and two centimeters in length.

== Taxonomy ==
When first described, it was placed in genus Wigandia, so its basionym is Wigandia californica.

== Distribution ==
It is native to California and Oregon, where it grows in several types of habitats, including chaparral and coast redwood forests.

== Ecology ==
E. californicum is a specific food and habitat plant for the butterfly Papilio eurymedon. It is the primary nectar source for variable checkerspot butterflies in the Jasper Ridge Biological Preserve in California.

== Phytochemicals ==
Eriodictyol is one of the 4 flavanones identified as having taste-modifying properties, the other three being: homoeriodictyol, its sodium salt, and sterubin. These compounds may be used in food and pharmaceuticals to mask bitter taste.

== Uses ==
This species of shrub is used for revegetating damaged or disturbed lands, such as overgrazed rangeland. It is strongly fire-adapted, sprouting from rhizomes after wildfire and developing a waxy film of flammable resins on its foliage.

The leaves have historically been used in traditional medicine to treat various ailments.

Yerba santa extract may be marketed as a dietary supplement.
