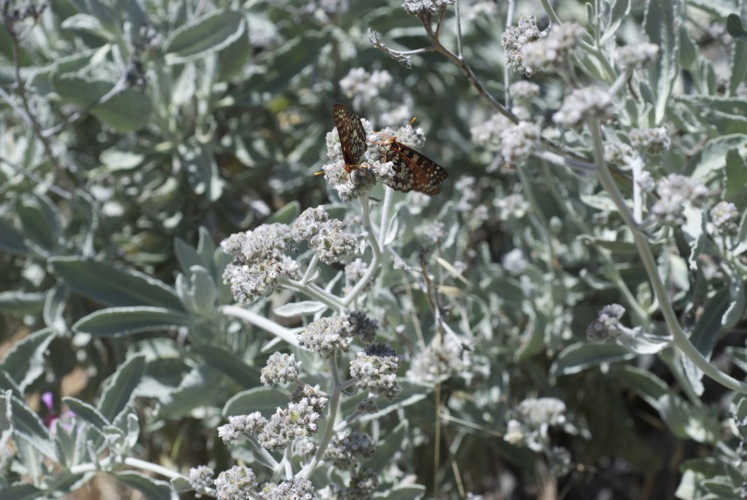

Scientific classification
- Kingdom: Plantae
- Clade: Tracheophytes
- Clade: Angiosperms
- Clade: Eudicots
- Clade: Asterids
- Order: Boraginales
- Family: Namaceae
- Genus: Eriodictyon
- Species: E. tomentosum

Binomial name
- Eriodictyon tomentosum Benth.

= Eriodictyon tomentosum =

Species of flowering plant

Eriodictyon tomentosum is a species of flowering plant in the family Namaceae known by the common name woolly yerba santa. It is endemic to California, where it grows on the slopes of the central coast ranges.

== Description ==
Eriodictyon tomentosum is a shrub reaching a maximum height of one to three meters. Its twigs and foliage are covered in a dense coat of white woolly hairs, giving the bush a silvery look. The leaves are oval and up to ten centimeters long and five wide, and they may have small teeth along the edges. The bush flowers in dense fuzzy bunches of very light lavender glandular blossoms, each a few millimeters long. The fruit is a tiny capsule less than three millimeters wide, containing about 10 minute seeds.

== Distribution ==
This shrub can be found only in the California Coast Ranges, where it occurs in grassland and chaparral plant communities.
