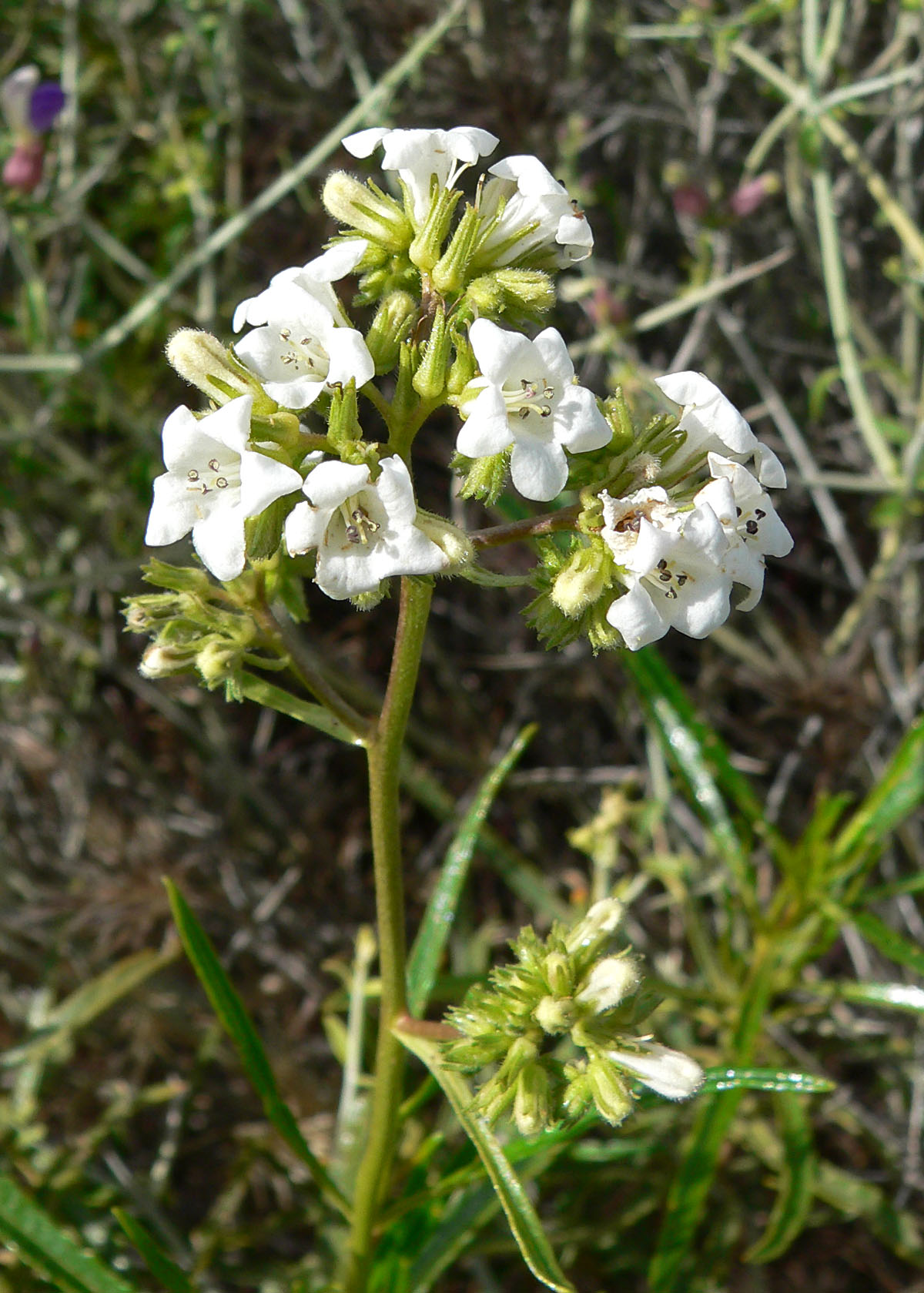

Scientific classification
- Kingdom: Plantae
- Clade: Tracheophytes
- Clade: Angiosperms
- Clade: Eudicots
- Clade: Asterids
- Order: Boraginales
- Family: Namaceae
- Genus: Eriodictyon
- Species: E. angustifolium

Binomial name
- Eriodictyon angustifolium Nutt.

= Eriodictyon angustifolium =

Species of flowering plant

Eriodictyon angustifolium, common name narrowleaf yerba santa, is a perennial shrub.

The plant is native to pinyon-juniper woodland habits of western North American deserts. It is found in the Mojave Desert in California, Nevada, & Utah; and in Baja California.

== Description ==
Eriodictyon angustifolium has toothed leaves, about 10 centimeters in length, that are sticky above and hairy below.

The white, five-petaled flowers are in bloom in June &/or July.

== Distribution ==
In Baja California, this plant is found growing in the foothills of the Sierra de Juarez and the Sierra de San Pedro Martir, but it can be found growing further south on the sky islands of the Sierra de la Asamblea and the Sierra de San Borja.

== Uses ==
Eriodictyon angustifolium extract, but not Eriodictyon californicum extract, reduces human hair greying. Sterubin is the most abundant flavonoid in Eriodictyon angustifolium extract.

Dietary eriodictyon angustifolium tea supports prevention of hair graying by reducing DNA damage in CD34+ hair follicular keratinocyte stem cells.
