= Flavanone =

Class of chemical compounds

Flavanone skeleton with locants

The flavanones, a type of flavonoids, are various aromatic, colorless ketones derived from flavone that often occur in plants as glycosides.

== List of flavanones ==
- Blumeatin
- Butin
- Dichamanetin
- Eriodictyol
- Eriocitrin
- Hesperetin
- Hesperidin
- Homoeriodictyol
- Isosakuranetin
- Kolaflavanone
- Naringenin
- Naringin
- Pinocembrin
- Poncirin
- Sakuranetin
- Sakuranin
- Sterubin
- Pinostrobin

== Metabolism ==
The enzyme chalcone isomerase uses a chalcone-like compound to produce a flavanone.

Flavanone 4-reductase is an enzyme that uses (2S)-flavan-4-ol and NADP^{+} to produce (2S)-flavanone, NADPH, and H^{+}.

== Synthesis ==
Numerous methods exist for the enantioselective chemical and biochemical synthesis of flavanones and related compounds.
