= Eriodictyol =

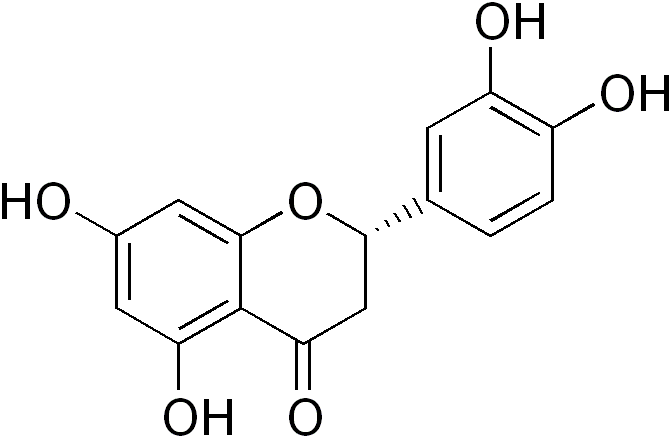

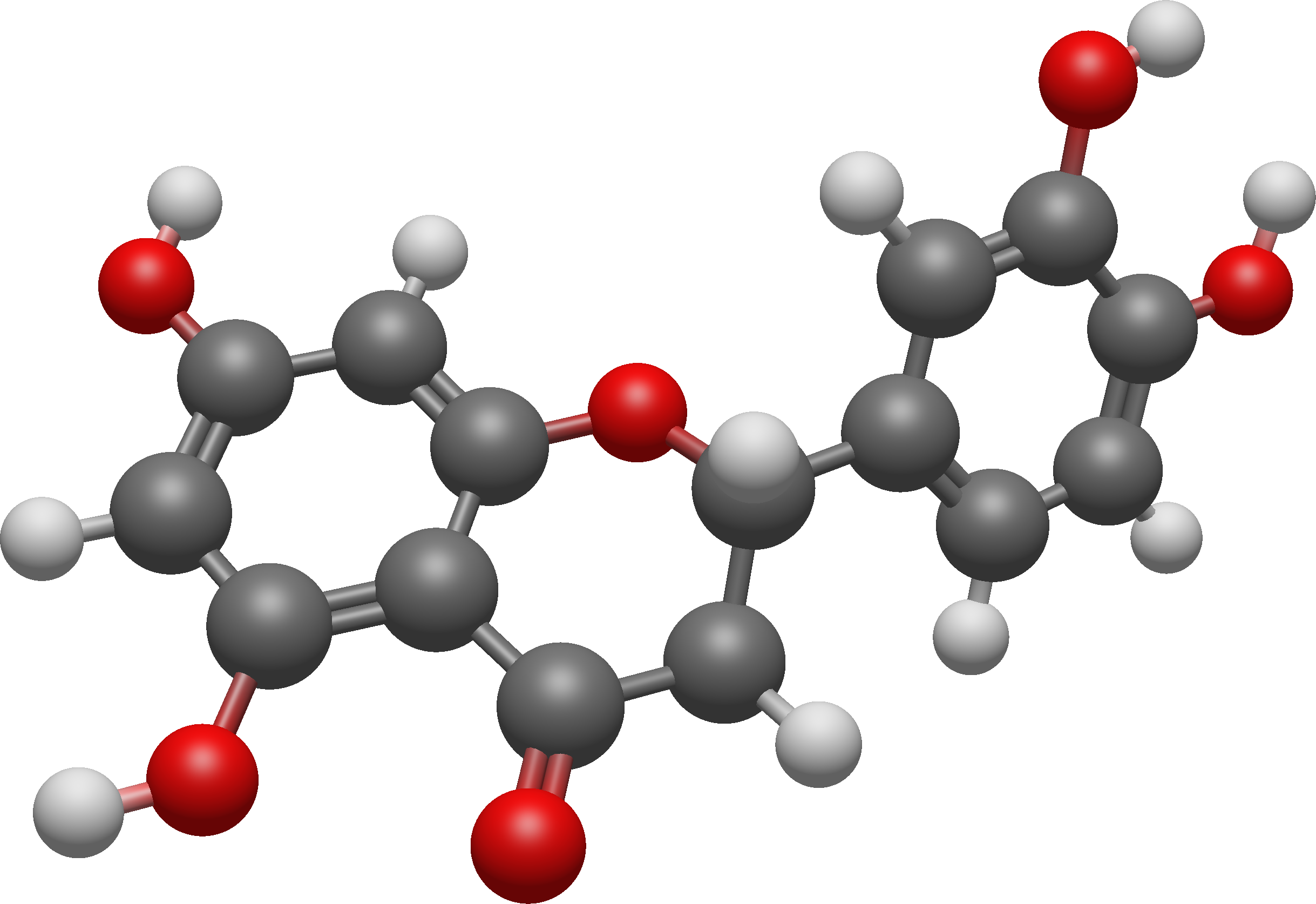

Names
- IUPAC name (2S)-3′,4′,5,7-Tetrahydroxyflavan-4-one
- Systematic IUPAC name (2S)-2-(3,4-Dihydroxyphenyl)-5,7-dihydroxy-2,3-dihydro-4H-1-benzopyran-4-one
- Other names Eriodictiol

Identifiers
CAS Number	552-58-9
3D model (JSmol)	Interactive image
Beilstein Reference	92358
ChEBI	CHEBI:28412
ChEMBL	ChEMBL8996
ChemSpider	389606
ECHA InfoCard	100.008.198
EC Number	209-016-4
KEGG	C05631
PubChem CID	440735
UNII	Q520486B8Y
CompTox Dashboard (EPA)	DTXSID70877706
- InChI: InChI=1S/C15H12O6/c16-8-4-11(19)15-12(20)6-13(21-14(15)5-8)7-1-2-9(17)10(18)3-7/h1-5,13,16-19H,6H2/t13-/m0/s1 Key: SBHXYTNGIZCORC-ZDUSSCGKSA-N; InChI=1/C15H12O6/c16-8-4-11(19)15-12(20)6-13(21-14(15)5-8)7-1-2-9(17)10(18)3-7/h1-5,13,16-19H,6H2/t13-/m0/s1 Key: SBHXYTNGIZCORC-ZDUSSCGKBZ
- SMILES: O=C2c3c(O[C@H](c1ccc(O)c(O)c1)C2)cc(O)cc3O

Properties
Chemical formula	C_{15}H_{12}O_{6}
Molar mass	288.255 g·mol^{−1}
- Except where otherwise noted, data are given for materials in their standard state (at 25 °C [77 °F], 100 kPa). verify (what is ?) Infobox references

Eriodictyol is a bitter-masking flavanone, a flavonoid extracted from yerba santa (Eriodictyon californicum), a plant native to North America. Eriodictyol is one of the four flavanones identified in this plant as having taste-modifying properties, the other three being homoeriodictyol, its sodium salt, and sterubin.

Eriodictyol has garnered scientific attention for its strong antioxidant, anti-inflammatory, and neuroprotective properties. Structurally similar to other flavonoids, such as hesperidin and naringenin, eriodictyol scavenges free radicals and regulates inflammatory responses.

Eriodictyol was also found in the twigs of Millettia duchesnei, in Eupatorium arnottianum, and its glycosides (eriocitrin) in lemons and rose hips (Rosa canina).

Eriodictyol belongs to the flavanone subclass of flavonoids and has a chemical structure defined by the molecular formula C_{15}H_{12}O_{6}, with a molecular weight of 288.25 g/mol.
