= Rutinose =

Names
- IUPAC name 6-Deoxy-α-L-mannopyranosyl-(1→6)-β-D-glucopyranose
- Systematic IUPAC name (2R,3S,4S,5S)-6-[ [(2R,3R,4R,5R,6S)-3,4,5-trihydroxy-6-methyl-oxan-2-yl]oxymethyl]oxane-2,3,4,5-tetrol
- Other names 6-O-(α-L-Rhamnosyl)-D-glucose, 6-O-(α-L-Rhamnopyranosyl)-D-glucopyranose, 6-O-(6-Deoxy-alpha-L-mannopyranosyl)-D-glucose, α-L-Rhamnopyranosyl-(1→6)-β-D-glucopyranose

Identifiers
| CAS Number | 90-74-4 |
| 3D model (JSmol) | Interactive image |
| ChEBI | CHEBI:27522 |
| ChemSpider | 390162 |
| ECHA InfoCard | 100.001.832 |
| EC Number | 202-014-4 |
| PubChem CID | 441429 |
| UNII | 0C4U3505G3 |
| CompTox Dashboard (EPA) | DTXSID401226338 DTXSID70896972, DTXSID401226338 |
- InChI: InChI=1S/C12H22O10/c1-3-5(13)7(15)10(18)12(21-3)20-2-4-6(14)8(16)9(17)11(19)22-4/h3-19H,2H2,1H3/t3-,4+,5-,6+,7+,8-,9+,10+,11+,12+/m0/s1 Key: OVVGHDNPYGTYIT-BNXXONSGSA-N; InChI=1/C12H22O10/c1-3-5(13)7(15)10(18)12(21-3)20-2-4-6(14)8(16)9(17)11(19)22-4/h3-19H,2H2,1H3/t3-,4+,5-,6+,7+,8-,9+,10+,11+,12+/m0/s1 Key: OVVGHDNPYGTYIT-BNXXONSGBT
- SMILES: O(C[C@H]1O[C@@H](O)[C@H](O)[C@@H](O)[C@@H]1O)[C@@H]2O[C@H]([C@H](O)[C@@H](O)[C@H]2O)C

Properties
| Chemical formula | C_{12}H_{22}O_{10} |
| Molar mass | 326.297 g/mol |
| Density | 1.662 g/mL |
- Except where otherwise noted, data are given for materials in their standard state (at 25 °C [77 °F], 100 kPa). verify (what is ?) Infobox references

Rutinose is the disaccharide also known as 6-O-α-L-rhamnosyl-D-glucose (C_{12}H_{22}O_{10}) that is present in some flavonoid glycosides. It is prepared from rutin by hydrolysis with the enzyme rhamnodiastase.
