= Wilfred Stein =

South African – Israeli biophysicist

Wilfred Donald Stein
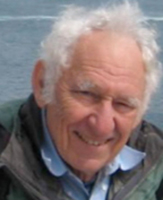
- Stein in 2015
- Born: Wilfred Donald Stein; November 26, 1931 (age 94); Durban, South Africa
- Spouse: Chana Morgenstern (m. 1954)
- Awards: Honorary Member, National Society of Pure and Applied Biophysics of Romania (1991)

Education
- Education: King's College London

Philosophical work
- Era: 21st-century philosophy
- Region: Biophysics
- School: Natural science
- Institutions: Hebrew University
- Main interests: Biophysics, Natural science, membrane transport, water transport, transport kinetics, mathematical modeling, evolution
- Notable works: The Movement of Molecules across Cell Membranes (1967); Transport & Diffusion Across Cell Membranes (1986); Channels, Carriers & Pumps: An Introduction to Membrane Transport (1990/2015); Thinking about Biology (1993)
- Notable ideas: cation occlusion, osmotic engines, the cell membrane as a fluid, amphiphilic structure

Wilfred D. Stein (Hebrew: זאב וילפרד שטיין) is a writer and biophysicist who has applied mathematical principles to medical, biologic, and oncologic problems.

== Early life and education ==
Wilfred Donald Stein was born on 26 November 1931 in Durban, South Africa to Philip, a mathematician, and Lily (née Rolnick) Stein. His parents emigrated from Lithuania as young children. He was the third of his siblings, Sylvester Stein (born 25 December 1920) and Zena Stein (born 7 July 1922). Wilfred Stein attended the University of the Witwatersrand (Wits), Johannesburg SA, receiving his MSc degree in 1954 based on his thesis "Melanogenesis and the structure of the melanin granue." In 1954, he married Chana Morgenstern, born 27 October 1934, before leaving South Africa to study in London, UK. They had four children, Aryeh David (b. 1956), Moshe Baruch (b 1960), Gideon Paschal (b. 1962) and Rebecca Miriam (b. 1966). He has 9 grandchildren.

== Scientific career ==
Stein received his M.Sc. degree in 1954 in Physiological Chemistry from the University of the Witwatersrand, and his PhD degree from King's College London in 1958 in Biophysics. He did postdoctoral work in University of Cambridge UK and University of Michigan Ann Arbor, before taking up a position as Assistant Professor at the University of Manchester UK (1963–1968). He moved to Israel in late 1968, joining the faculty of the Alexander Silberman Institute of Life sciences, Hebrew University of Jerusalem in 1969, where he remained until his retirement in 2006. He taught biochemistry, biophysics and physiology. He also taught at the Weizmann Institute in Israel, where he continued as a consultant through 2003.

Following his retirement, Stein has continued to bring his mathematical perspective to medical problems, both while working as a Professor Emeritus at Hebrew University and including also a number of Visiting Professorships and Sabbatical fellowships in the laboratories of Dr. Michael Lanzer, Dr. Igor Roninson, Dr. Michael Gottesman, Dr. Thomas Zeuthen, Dr. Susan Bates and Dr. Tito Fojo.

Besides Stein's contribution to concepts in kinetics, biology, and medicine, he also, together with Eric Barnard, conducted work on the first labeling of the active center of an enzyme, ribonuclease, identifying histidine residue 119. He is the author of more than 300 peer-reviewed publications, 9 books on topics in science, and 2 family memoirs.

== Research accomplishments ==
=== Membrane transport physiology ===
Conceptualization and mathematical modeling of how membrane channels, carriers and pumps work to transport molecules across the cell membrane. Stein was the first to propose a model of the cell membrane as a fluid, amphiphilic structure. He presented this idea at the Society of General Physiology meeting in 1968, where the chairman of the session said: "Let’s stop here and discuss this interesting new idea" . Stein's model, however, was not as cogent as the fluid mosaic model some years later presented by Singer and Nicolson, who are credited with the idea in text-books.

The kinetic equations of membrane transport were developed by Stein, together with William Lieb, and published in “Transport and Diffusion Across Cell Membranes”, a comprehensive treatment of transport kinetics.

=== Na,K-pump (Na,K-ATPase) ===
In collaboration with Steven Karlish at the Weizmann Institute, Stein investigated the kinetic mechanism of active Na and K ion transport, confirming the basic alternating access model of active Na and K transport. An important finding was that trapping or “occlusion” of the K and Na ions in the protein has the functional role of minimizing wasteful cation leakages through the system, thus ensuring optimal efficiency of energy coupling between ATP (Adenosine Triphosphate) hydrolysis and active Na and K ion movements, 3 Na ions out of and 2 K ions into the cell per cycle, respectively. Cation occlusion is now considered an essential property of all ATP-driven cation pumps and also other coupled cation transport systems (e.g. cation exchangers or co-transport proteins).

=== Flux of calcium across calcium-transporting cells ===
Stein collaborated with Felix Bronner, an authority on the physiology of calcium movements, in developing a model that could account for the rates of transmembrane movements of calcium in the face of the cell's extremely low concentrations of the ion. They postulated that the role of the cell's calcium-binding proteins was to raise effective calcium concentrations and thus provide the necessary high transcellular calcium fluxes.

=== Coupling of salt/substrate and water transport in membrane proteins ===
As a visiting scientist at the University of Copenhagen in 1993, Stein worked with the Danish physiologist Thomas Zeuthen on the coupling of water and substrates in membrane proteins. They provided a conceptual framework for how a flux of substrates through a membrane protein can lead to a co-flux of water. Zeuthen & Stein suggested that the substrate-flux generates a hyperosmolar compartment within the protein, i.e. in the aqueous cavities abutting the outer solutions. As a result, water enters this compartment by osmosis and proceeds across the membrane.

=== ABC transporter kinetics ===
In collaboration with Thomas Litman, at the University of Copenhagen, Stein worked out the kinetics of the ABC transporter P-glycoprotein (ABCB1) based on transport and ATPase measurements.

The two often observed co-operative behavior between 2 substrates, and found that kinetics included non-competitive, competitive, and allosteric interactions.

=== A two-step model for pumping of drugs by P-glycoprotein ===
In a collaboration with Suresh Ambudkar and his group, Stein presented estimates of the turnover numbers for ATP hydrolysis and drug transport by P-glycoprotein, leading them to conclude that more than a single ATP molecule was hydrolyzed for each drug molecule pumped. In further collaboration with Litman, and based on detailed kinetic measurements of drug accumulation in cell lines with different levels of the multidrug resistance transporter P-glycoprotein, Stein worked out a simple equation for the “leak-pump” mode of action of the drug efflux pump, P-glycoprotein.

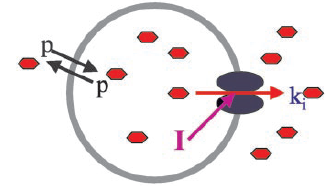
Leak-pump model of P-glycoprotein

The ratio of free substrate concentration (inside to outside) at steady state

=== Cell cycle effects of drugs are concentration dependent ===
In collaboration with Michael M. Gottesman, Stein demonstrated that high and low concentrations of cytotoxic chemotherapy can provoke two entirely different effects on cell cycle events in NIH3T3 cells despite their intact cell cycle check points: reversible G2/M versus irreversible G1 and S arrest. This experiment demonstrated that understanding clinical drug resistance will require knowledge of the drug levels to which cells are actually exposed

=== Modeling of P-glycoprotein inhibition ===
In collaboration with Dr. Susan Bates, Stein carried out mathematical modeling of P-glycoprotein inhibition in blood samples from patients enrolled on clinical trials of ABCB1 inhibitors. Channel shift values as a function of valspodar (P-glycoprotein inhibitor) blood concentrations were fitted to a simple descending hyperbolic, Michaelis–Menten-type saturation curve, revealing that valspodar is a P-glycoprotein substrate, which is effluxed from the cells. Inhibition appears to plateau above a plasma level of 1000 ng/ml indicating that concentrations were typically in range for inhibition of P-glycoprotein in patient tumors.

=== Mathematical model of ABCB1 conformational changes ===
Together with Igor Roninson and Todd Druley, Stein performed mathematical modeling of conformational changes observed in ABC transporters after substrate binding.

=== Malaria transport kinetics ===
In collaboration with Michael Lanzer, Stein demonstrated that via mutations in the chloroquine resistance transporter (PfCRT), the antimalarial drug chloroquine is transported away from its target, the parasite's digestive vacuole, which does not occur via the wild-type form of PfCRT. They also demonstrated that PfCRT is able to transport diverse antimalarial drugs and that chloroquine and quinine compete for transport via PfCRT in a manner that is consistent with mixed-type inhibition. Other studies showed that PfMDR1 transports drugs, such as chloroquine and quinine, into the digestive vacuole and that mutations in this ABC-transporter reduce drug transport efficiency and, hence, contribute to drug resistance. Their kinetic studies further supported the hypothesis that drug transport via PfCRT and PfMDR1 can incur a fitness cost as these drugs compete with the natural substrate for transport.

An important finding from the joint work with Lanzer, was that – based on transport kinetics – they showed the system is a co-transporter of chloroquine and protons. In addition, work with the Lanzer group led to the identification of a candidate gene for quinine and quinidine resistance.

With his son Moshe Hoshen, together with Hoshen's doctoral supervisor, Hagai Ginsburg, Stein also carried out mathematical modeling of artemisinin treatment of malaria. Hoshen proposed a model in which artemisinin resistance is based on a dormancy stage during which the parasite waits out toxic concentrations of this antimalarial drug. Fundamental to these studies was the mathematical modeling on transport of antimalarial drugs, collaborations with Ginsburg at Hebrew University, that led to a series of joint publications.

=== Relationship of tumor growth to outcome ===
Applying exponential growth kinetics to clinical trial data, Stein derived a set of equations that model tumor growth metrics in patients. These equations have now been applied to over 40,000 patient data sets, in collaboration with Drs. Tito Fojo, Krastan Blagoev, and Susan Bates.

Individual patient data including tumor measurements for most, PSA data for prostate cancer, CA19-9 data for pancreatic cancer, and M-spike measurements, are fit to Stein's series of equations developed and validated that allow determination of regression, d, or growth, g. A series of observations using these equations have been generated – that g correlates with survival, that g is stable while patients are on therapy, that g determines the tumor nadir rather than d, that g for an individual patient can be benchmarked against g for groups of patients, that g can often be determined in a higher fraction of patients on study than a progression endpoint, that g offers a continuous response assessment metric, and that median g for patients enrolled on a clinical trial can be compared across trials, or benchmarked against historical data. This work is poised for use by the pharmaceutical industry in drug development.

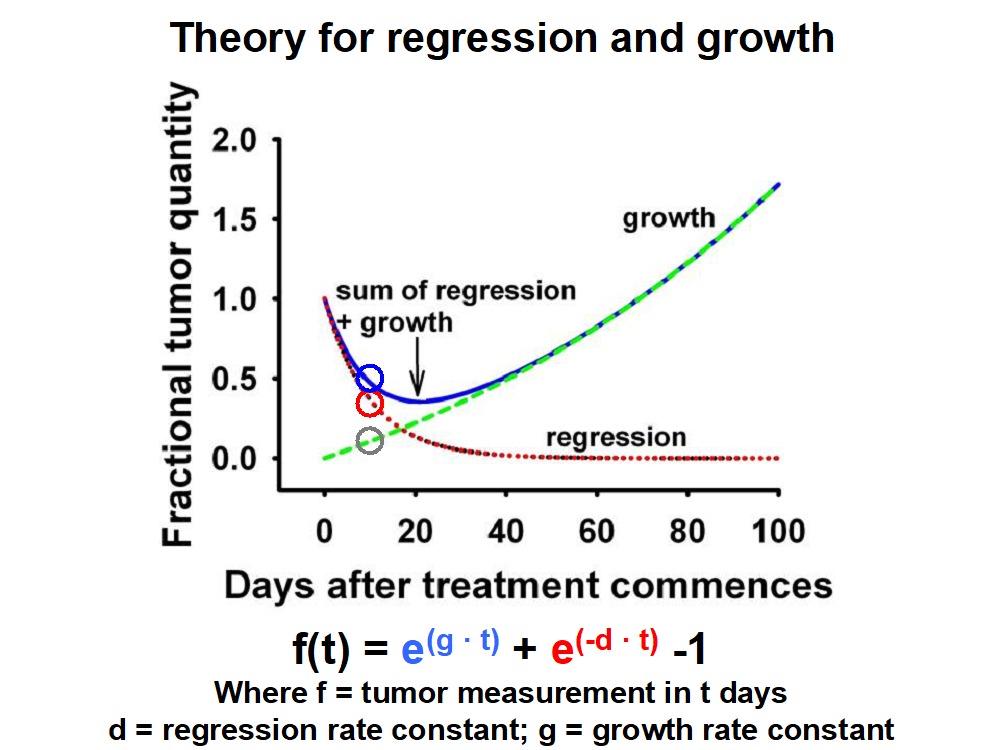
Stein's Growth and Regression Rate Equation

=== On the ages of genes ===
In recent years Stein has focused on the phylostratigraphic understanding of gene evolution.

== Books ==
=== Science ===
- Stein WD. The Movement of Molecules across Cell Membranes. Academic Press 1967.
- Stein WD. Transport and Diffusion Across Cell Membranes. Academic Press 1986.
- Stein WD. Thinking About Biology. Westview Press 1993.
- Stein WD, Litman T. Channels, Carriers, and Pumps: An Introduction to Membrane Transport, 2nd Edition. Academic Press 2015.

=== Memoir and genealogy ===
- Stein WD. The Rolnick Chromosomes: The Global Dispersion of the Rolniks of Lithuania Paperback. CreateSpace Independent Publishing Platform 2014
- Stein WD. Roch's History Of The Morgenstern-Maisel-Atlas Families: A History of the Morgenstern, Maisel and Atlas Families. CreateSpace Independent Publishing Platform 2014
