= Chloroquine =

Medication used to treat malaria

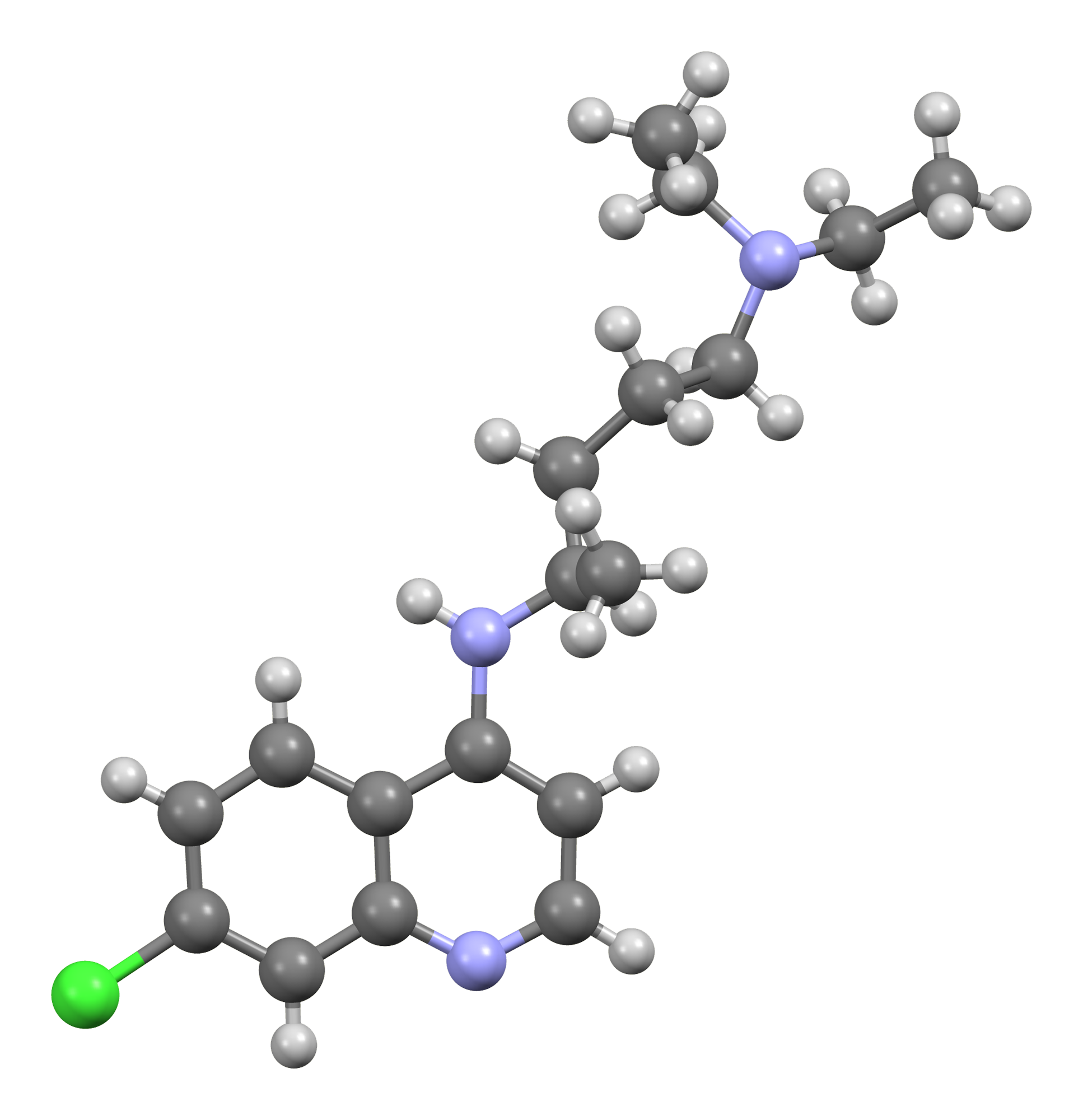

Clinical data
- Pronunciation: /ˈklɔːrəkwiːn/
- Trade names: Aralen, other
- Other names: Chloroquine phosphate
- AHFS/Drugs.com: Monograph
- License data: US DailyMed: Chloroquine
- Routes of administration: By mouth
- ATC code: P01BA01 (WHO) P01BB52 (WHO)

Legal status
- Legal status: UK: P (Pharmacy medicines); US: ℞-only; In general: ℞ (Prescription only)

Pharmacokinetic data
- Metabolism: Liver
- Elimination half-life: 1-2 months

Identifiers
- IUPAC name: (RS)-N'-(7-chloroquinolin-4-yl)-N,N-diethylpentane-1,4-diamine
- CAS Number: 54-05-7
- PubChem CID: 2719
- IUPHAR/BPS: 5535
- DrugBank: DB00608
- ChemSpider: 2618
- UNII: 886U3H6UFF
- KEGG: D02366
- ChEBI: CHEBI:3638
- ChEMBL: ChEMBL76
- NIAID ChemDB: 000733
- CompTox Dashboard (EPA): DTXSID2040446
- ECHA InfoCard: 100.000.175

Chemical and physical data
- Formula: C_{18}H_{26}ClN_{3}
- Molar mass: 319.88 g·mol^{−1}
- 3D model (JSmol): Interactive image
- SMILES: Clc1cc2nccc(c2cc1)NC(C)CCCN(CC)CC
- InChI: InChI=1S/C18H26ClN3/c1-4-22(5-2)12-6-7-14(3)21-17-10-11-20-18-13-15(19)8-9-16(17)18/h8-11,13-14H,4-7,12H2,1-3H3,(H,20,21); Key:WHTVZRBIWZFKQO-UHFFFAOYSA-N

Chloroquine is an antiparasitic medication that treats malaria. It works by increasing the levels of heme in the blood, a substance toxic to the malarial parasite. This kills the parasite and stops the infection from spreading. Certain types of malaria, resistant strains, and complicated cases typically require different or additional medication. Chloroquine is also occasionally used for amebiasis that is occurring outside the intestines, rheumatoid arthritis, and lupus erythematosus. While it has not been formally studied in pregnancy, it appears safe. It is taken by mouth. It was studied to treat COVID-19 early in the pandemic, but these studies were largely halted in mid-2020, and the NIH does not recommend its use for this purpose.

Common side effects include muscle problems, loss of appetite, diarrhea, and skin rash. Serious side effects include problems with vision, muscle damage, seizures, and low blood cell levels. Chloroquine is a member of the drug class 4-aminoquinoline. As an antimalarial, it works against the asexual form of the malaria parasite in the stage of its life cycle within the red blood cell. How it works in rheumatoid arthritis and lupus erythematosus is unclear.

Chloroquine was discovered in 1934 by Hans Andersag. It is on the World Health Organization's List of Essential Medicines. It is available as a generic medication.

== Medical uses ==
=== Malaria ===
Chloroquine has been used in the treatment and prevention of malaria from Plasmodium vivax, P. ovale, and P. malariae. It is generally not used for Plasmodium falciparum as there is widespread resistance to it.

Chloroquine has been extensively used in mass drug administrations, which may have contributed to the emergence and spread of resistance. It is recommended to check if chloroquine is still effective in the region prior to using it. In areas where resistance is present, other antimalarials, such as mefloquine or atovaquone, may be used instead. The Centers for Disease Control and Prevention recommend against treatment of malaria with chloroquine alone due to more effective combinations.

=== Amebiasis ===
In treatment of amoebic liver abscess, chloroquine may be used instead of or in addition to other medications in the event of failure of improvement with metronidazole or another nitroimidazole within five days or intolerance to metronidazole or a nitroimidazole.

=== Rheumatic disease ===
As it mildly suppresses the immune system, chloroquine is used in some autoimmune disorders, such as rheumatoid arthritis and has an off-label indication for lupus erythematosus.

== Side effects ==
Side effects include blurred vision, nausea, vomiting, abdominal cramps, headache, diarrhea, swelling legs/ankles, shortness of breath, pale lips/nails/skin, muscle weakness, easy bruising/bleeding, hearing and mental problems.

- Unwanted/uncontrolled movements (including tongue and face twitching, diskenesia, and dystonia)
- Deafness or tinnitus
- Nausea, vomiting, diarrhea, abdominal cramps
- Headache
- Mental/mood changes (such as confusion, personality changes, unusual thoughts/behavior, depression, feeling being watched, hallucinating)
- Signs of serious infection (such as high fever, severe chills, persistent sore throat)
- Skin itchiness, skin color changes, hair loss, and skin rashes
  - Chloroquine-induced itching is very common among black Africans (70%), but much less common in other races. It increases with age, and is so severe as to stop compliance with drug therapy. It is increased during malaria fever; its severity is correlated to the malaria parasite load in blood. Some evidence indicates it has a genetic basis and is related to chloroquine action with opiate receptors centrally or peripherally.
- Triggering of a severe psoriasis attack in those with psoriasis
- Unpleasant metallic taste
  - This could be avoided by "taste-masked and controlled release" formulations such as multiple emulsions.
- Chloroquine retinopathy (irreversible retinal damage)
- Electrocardiographic changes
  - This manifests itself as either conduction disturbances (bundle-branch block, atrioventricular block) or cardiomyopathy — often with hypertrophy, restrictive physiology, and congestive heart failure. The changes may be irreversible. Only two cases have been reported requiring heart transplantation, suggesting this particular risk is very low. Electron microscopy of cardiac biopsies show pathognomonic cytoplasmic inclusion bodies.
- Pancytopenia, aplastic anemia, reversible agranulocytosis, low blood platelets, neutropenia
- Worsening of the condition for those with porphyria
- Delayed hypersensitivity syndrome has been described.

=== Pregnancy ===
Chloroquine has not been shown to have any harmful effects on the fetus when used in the recommended doses for malarial prophylaxis. Small amounts of chloroquine are excreted in the breast milk of lactating women. However, this drug can be safely prescribed to infants, the effects are not harmful. Studies with mice show that radioactively tagged chloroquine passed through the placenta rapidly and accumulated in the fetal eyes which remained present five months after the drug was cleared from the rest of the body. Women who are pregnant or planning on getting pregnant are still advised against traveling to malaria-risk regions.

=== Elderly ===
There is not enough evidence to determine whether chloroquine is safe to be given to people aged 65 and older. Since it is cleared by the kidneys, toxicity should be monitored carefully in people with poor kidney functions, as is more likely to be the case in the elderly.

== Drug interactions ==
Chloroquine has a number of drug–drug interactions that might be of clinical concern:

- Ampicillin – levels may be reduced by chloroquine;
- Antacids – may reduce absorption of chloroquine;
- Cimetidine – may inhibit metabolism of chloroquine; increasing levels of chloroquine in the body;
- Cyclosporine – levels may be increased by chloroquine; and
- Mefloquine – may increase risk of convulsions.

== Overdose ==
Chloroquine, in overdose, has a risk of death of about 20%. It is rapidly absorbed from the gut with an onset of symptoms generally within an hour. Symptoms of overdose may include sleepiness, vision changes, seizures, stopping of breathing, and heart problems such as ventricular fibrillation and low blood pressure. Low blood potassium may also occur.

While the usual dose of chloroquine used in treatment is 10 mg/kg, toxicity begins to occur at 20 mg/kg, and death may occur at 30 mg/kg. In children as little as a single tablet can be fatal.

Treatment recommendations include early mechanical ventilation, cardiac monitoring, and activated charcoal. Intravenous fluids and vasopressors may be required with epinephrine being the vasopressor of choice. Seizures may be treated with benzodiazepines. Intravenous potassium chloride may be required, however this may result in high blood potassium later in the course of the disease. Dialysis has not been found to be useful.

== Pharmacology ==
Absorption of chloroquine is rapid and primarily happens in the gastrointestinal tract. It is widely distributed in body tissues. Protein binding in plasma ranges from 46% to 79%. Its metabolism is partially hepatic, giving rise to its main metabolite, desethylchloroquine. Its excretion is ≥50% as unchanged drug in urine, where acidification of urine increases its elimination. It has a very high volume of distribution, as it diffuses into the body's adipose tissue.

Accumulation of the drug may result in deposits that can lead to blurred vision and blindness. It and related quinines have been associated with cases of retinal toxicity, particularly when provided at higher doses for longer times. With long-term doses, routine visits to an ophthalmologist are recommended.

Chloroquine is also a lysosomotropic agent, meaning it accumulates preferentially in the lysosomes of cells in the body. The pK_{a} for the quinoline nitrogen of chloroquine is 8.5, meaning it is about 10% deprotonated at physiological pH (per the Henderson-Hasselbalch equation). This decreases to about 0.2% at a lysosomal pH of 4.6. Because the deprotonated form is more membrane-permeable than the protonated form, a quantitative "trapping" of the compound in lysosomes results.

== Mechanism of action ==
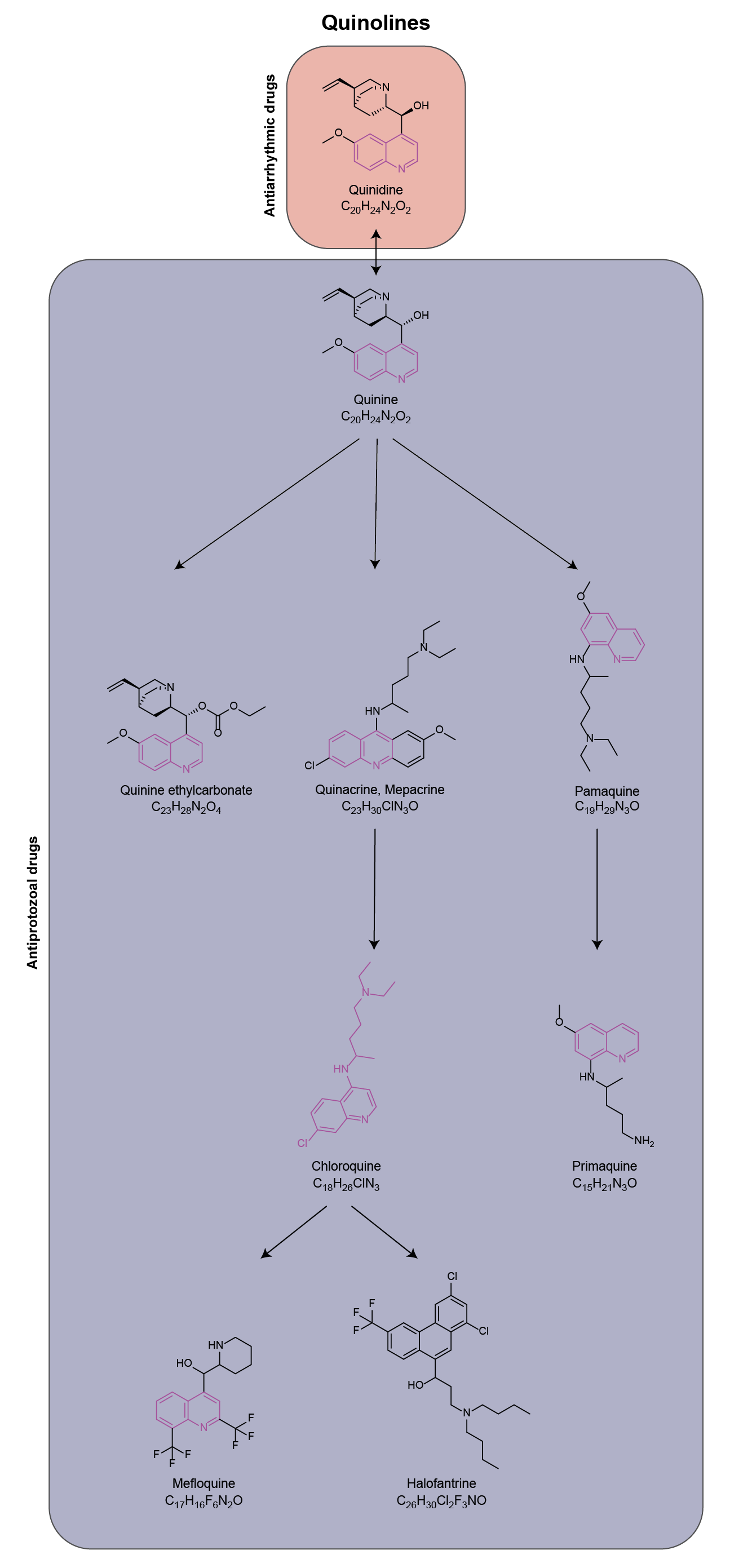
Medical quinolines

=== Malaria ===
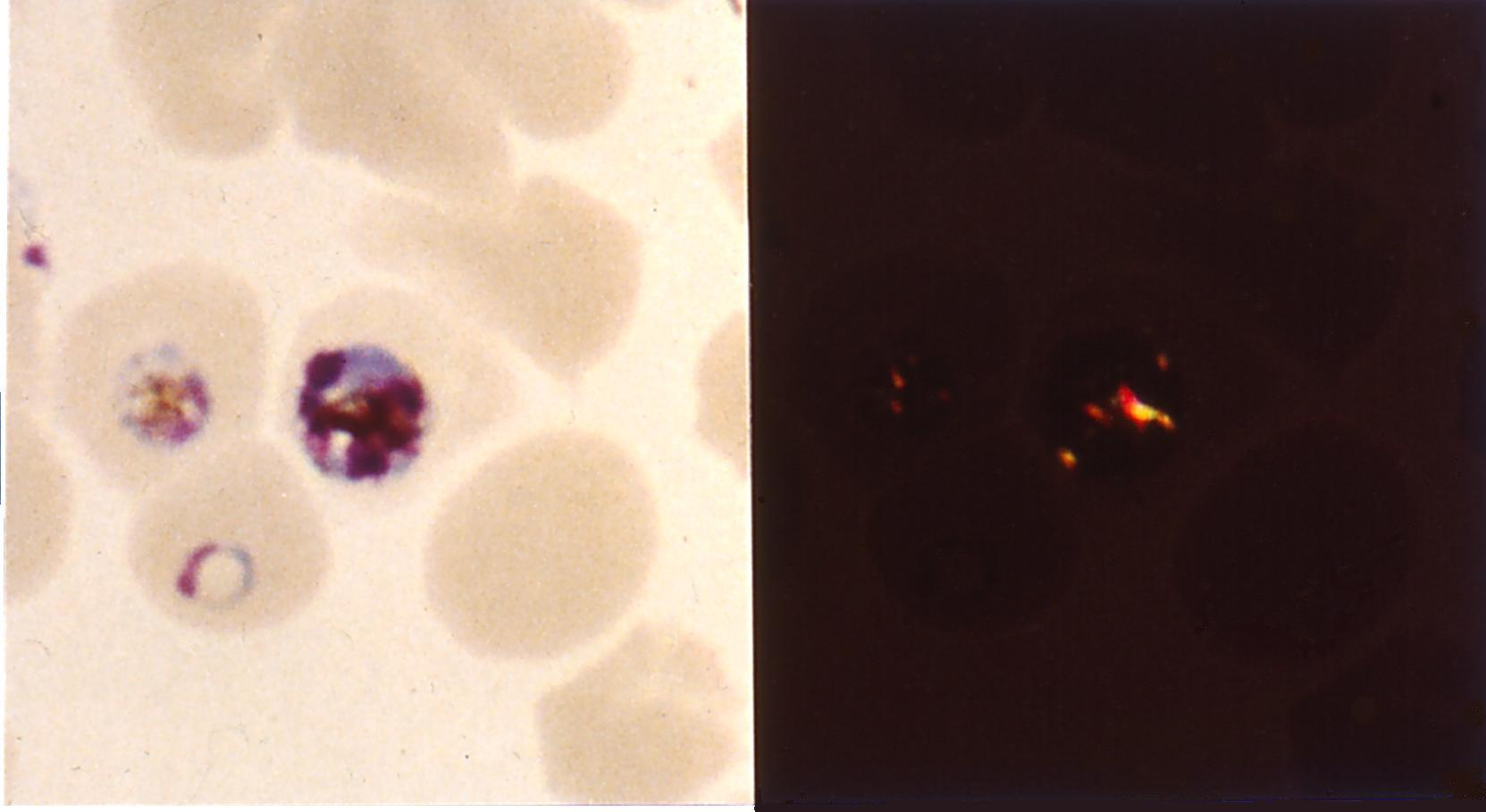
Hemozoin formation in P. falciparum: many antimalarials are strong inhibitors of hemozoin crystal growth.

The lysosomotropic character of chloroquine is believed to account for much of its antimalarial activity; the drug concentrates in the acidic food vacuole of the parasite and interferes with essential processes. Its lysosomotropic properties further allow for its use for in vitro experiments pertaining to intracellular lipid related diseases, autophagy, and apoptosis.

Inside red blood cells, the malarial parasite, which is then in its asexual lifecycle stage, must degrade hemoglobin to acquire essential amino acids, which the parasite requires to construct its own protein and for energy metabolism. Digestion is carried out in a vacuole of the parasitic cell.

Hemoglobin is composed of a protein unit (digested by the parasite) and a heme unit (not used by the parasite). During this process, the parasite releases the toxic and soluble molecule heme. The heme moiety consists of a porphyrin ring called Fe(II)-protoporphyrin IX (FP). To avoid destruction by this molecule, the parasite biocrystallizes heme to form hemozoin, a nontoxic molecule. Hemozoin collects in the digestive vacuole as insoluble crystals.

Chloroquine enters the red blood cell by simple diffusion, inhibiting the parasite cell and digestive vacuole. Chloroquine (CQ) then becomes protonated (to CQ^{2+}), as the digestive vacuole is known to be acidic (pH 4.7); chloroquine then cannot leave by diffusion. Chloroquine caps hemozoin molecules to prevent further biocrystallization of heme, thus leading to heme buildup. Chloroquine binds to heme (or FP) to form the FP-chloroquine complex; this complex is highly toxic to the cell and disrupts membrane function. Action of the toxic FP-chloroquine and FP results in cell lysis and ultimately parasite cell autodigestion. Parasites that do not form hemozoin are therefore resistant to chloroquine.

==== Resistance in malaria ====
Since the first documentation of P. falciparum chloroquine resistance in the 1950s, resistant strains have appeared throughout East and West Africa, Southeast Asia, and South America. The effectiveness of chloroquine against P. falciparum has declined as resistant strains of the parasite evolved.

Resistant parasites are able to rapidly remove chloroquine from the digestive vacuole using a transmembrane pump. Chloroquine-resistant parasites pump chloroquine out at 40 times the rate of chloroquine-sensitive parasites; the pump is coded by the P. falciparum chloroquine resistance transporter (PfCRT) gene. The natural function of the chloroquine pump is to transport peptides: mutations to the pump that allow it to pump chloroquine out impairs its function as a peptide pump and comes at a cost to the parasite, making it less fit.

Resistant parasites also frequently have mutation in the ABC transporter P. falciparum multidrug resistance (PfMDR1) gene, although these mutations are thought to be of secondary importance compared to PfCRT. An altered chloroquine-transporter protein, CG2 has been associated with chloroquine resistance, but other mechanisms of resistance also appear to be involved.

Verapamil, a Ca^{2+} channel blocker, has been found to restore both the chloroquine concentration ability and sensitivity to this drug. Other agents which have been shown to reverse chloroquine resistance in malaria are chlorpheniramine, gefitinib, imatinib, tariquidar and zosuquidar.

As of 2014 chloroquine is still effective against poultry malaria in Thailand. Sohsuebngarm et al. 2014 tested P. gallinaceum at Chulalongkorn University and found that the parasite is not resistant. Sertraline, fluoxetine and paroxetine reverse chloroquine resistance, making resistant biotypes susceptible if used in a cotreatment.

=== Antiviral ===
Chloroquine has antiviral effects against some viruses. It increases late endosomal and lysosomal pH, resulting in impaired release of the virus from the endosome or lysosome — release of the virus requires a low pH. The virus is therefore unable to release its genetic material into the cell and replicate.

Chloroquine also seems to act as a zinc ionophore that allows extracellular zinc to enter the cell and inhibit viral RNA-dependent RNA polymerase.

=== Other ===
Chloroquine inhibits thiamine uptake. It acts specifically on the transporter SLC19A3.

Against rheumatoid arthritis, it operates by inhibiting lymphocyte proliferation, phospholipase A2, antigen presentation in dendritic cells, release of enzymes from lysosomes, release of reactive oxygen species from macrophages, and production of IL-1.

== History ==
Quinine

In Peru, the indigenous people extracted the bark of the Cinchona tree (Cinchona officinalis) and used the extract to fight chills and fever in the seventeenth century. In 1633, this herbal medicine was introduced in Europe, where it was given the same use and also began to be used against malaria. The quinoline antimalarial drug quinine was isolated from the extract in 1820.

3-Methylchloroquine (sontochin)

After World War I, the German government sought alternatives to quinine. Chloroquine, a synthetic analogue with the same mechanism of action was discovered in 1934, by Hans Andersag and coworkers at the Bayer laboratories, who named it resochin. It was ignored for a decade, because it was considered too toxic for human use. Instead, in World War II, the German Africa Corps used the chloroquine analogue 3-methyl-chloroquine, known as sontochin. After Allied forces arrived in Tunis, sontochin fell into the hands of Americans, who sent the material back to the United States for analysis, leading to renewed interest in chloroquine. United States government-sponsored clinical trials for antimalarial drug development showed unequivocally that chloroquine has a significant therapeutic value as an antimalarial drug. It was introduced into clinical practice in 1947 for the prophylactic treatment of malaria.

=== Chemical synthesis ===
The first synthesis of chloroquine was disclosed in a patent filed by IG Farben in 1937. In the final step, 4,7-dichloroquinoline was reacted with 1-diethylamino-4-aminopentane.

By 1949, chloroquine manufacturing processes had been established to allow its widespread use.

== Society and culture ==
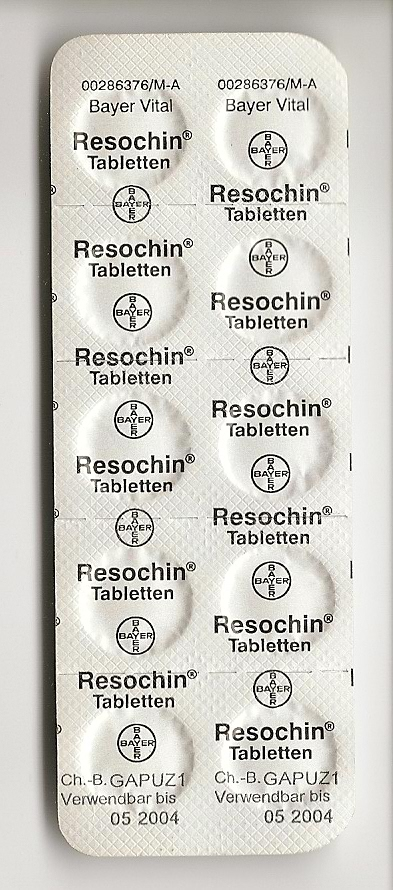
Resochin tablet package

=== Formulations ===
Chloroquine comes in tablet form as the phosphate, sulfate, and hydrochloride salts. Chloroquine is usually dispensed as the phosphate.

=== Names ===
Brand names include Chloroquine FNA, Resochin, Dawaquin, and Lariago.

== Other animals ==
Chloroquine, in various chemical forms, is used to treat and control surface growth of anemones and algae, and many protozoan infections in aquariums, e.g. the fish parasite Amyloodinium ocellatum. It is also used in poultry malaria.

== Research ==
In biomedicinal science, chloroquine is used for in vitro experiments to inhibit lysosomal degradation of protein products.

=== SARS-CoV ===
Chloroquine was proposed as a treatment for SARS, with in vitro tests inhibiting the severe acute respiratory syndrome coronavirus (SARS-CoV). In October 2004, a published report stated that chloroquine acts as an effective inhibitor of the replication of SARS-CoV in vitro. In August 2005, a peer-reviewed study confirmed and expanded upon the results.

=== COVID-19 ===
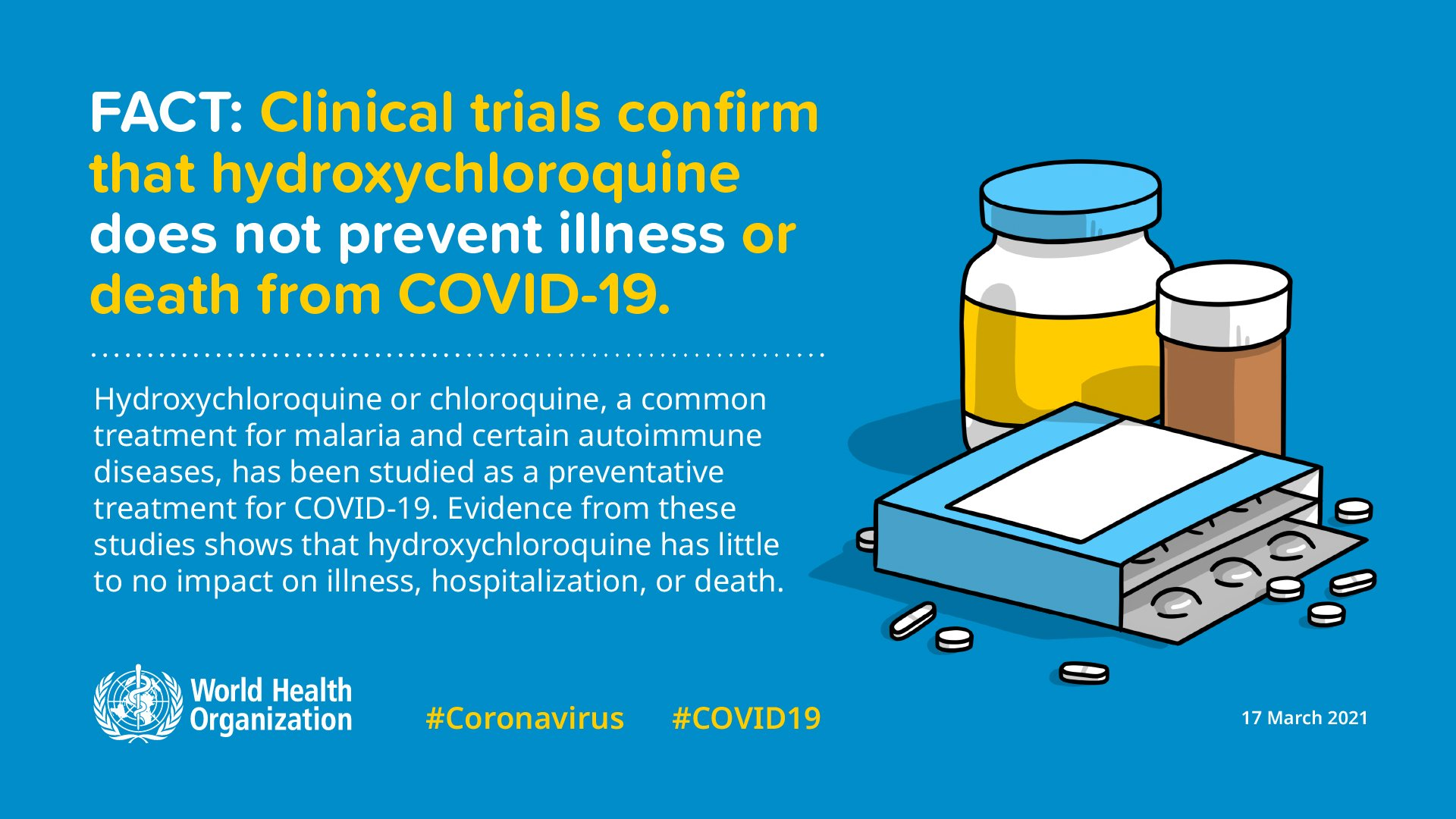
A World Health Organization infographic that states that hydroxychloroquine does not prevent illness or death from COVID-19

Chloroquine and hydroxychloroquine are anti-malarial medications also used against some auto-immune diseases. Chloroquine, along with hydroxychloroquine, was an early experimental treatment for COVID-19. Neither drug has been useful to prevent or treat SARS-CoV-2 infection. Administration of chloroquine or hydroxychloroquine to COVID-19 patients, either as monotherapies or in conjunction with azithromycin, has been associated with deleterious outcomes, such as QT prolongation. Scientific evidence does not substantiate the efficacy of hydroxychloroquine, with or without the addition of azithromycin, in the therapeutic management of COVID-19.

Cleavage of the SARS-CoV-2 S2 spike protein required for viral entry into cells can be accomplished by proteases TMPRSS2 located on the cell membrane, or by cathepsins (primarily cathepsin L) in endolysosomes. Hydroxychloroquine inhibits the action of cathepsin L in endolysosomes, but because cathepsin L cleavage is minor compared to TMPRSS2 cleavage, hydroxychloroquine does little to inhibit SARS-CoV-2 infection.

Several countries initially used chloroquine or hydroxychloroquine for treatment of persons hospitalized with COVID-19 (as of March 2020), though the drug was not formally approved through clinical trials. From April to June 2020, there was an emergency use authorization for their use in the United States, and was used off label for potential treatment of the disease. On 24 April 2020, citing the risk of "serious heart rhythm problems", the FDA posted a caution against using the drug for COVID-19 "outside of the hospital setting or a clinical trial".

Their use was withdrawn as a possible treatment for COVID-19 infection when it proved to have no benefit for hospitalized patients with severe COVID-19 illness in the international Solidarity trial and UK RECOVERY Trial. On 15 June 2020, the FDA revoked its emergency use authorization, stating that it was "no longer reasonable to believe" that the drug was effective against COVID-19 or that its benefits outweighed "known and potential risks". In late 2020, the National Institutes of Health issued treatment guidelines recommending against the use of hydroxychloroquine for COVID-19 except as part of a clinical trial.

In 2021, hydroxychloroquine was part of the recommended treatment for mild cases in India.

In 2020, the speculative use of hydroxychloroquine for COVID-19 threatened its availability for people with established indications (malaria and auto-immune diseases).

=== Other ===
Chloroquine was being considered in 2003, in pre-clinical models as a potential agent against chikungunya fever.

The radiosensitizing and chemosensitizing properties of chloroquine are being evaluated for anticancer strategies in humans.

Chloroquine and its modified forms have also been evaluated as treatment options for inflammatory conditions like rheumatoid arthritis and inflammatory bowel disease.
