= C28H34O14 =

The molecular formula C_{28}H_{34}O_{14} (molar mass: 594.56 g/mol, exact mass: 594.194856 u) may refer to:

- Poncirin
- Didymin
