= Zosuquidar =

Chemical compound

Clinical data
- Other names: LY-335979
- ATC code: None

Legal status
- Legal status: Investigational

Identifiers
- IUPAC name: (2R)-1-{4-[(1aR,10bS)-1,1-Difluoro-1,1a,6,10b-tetrahydrodibenzo[a,e]cyclopropa[c][7]annulen-6-yl}-3-(quinolin-5-yloxy)propan-2-ol
- CAS Number: 167354-41-8
- PubChem CID: 153997
- DrugBank: DB06191
- ChemSpider: 24599682
- UNII: AB5K82X98Y
- KEGG: D06387
- ChEMBL: ChEMBL444172
- CompTox Dashboard (EPA): DTXSID9057894
- ECHA InfoCard: 100.236.552

Chemical and physical data
- Formula: C_{32}H_{31}F_{2}N_{3}O_{2}
- Molar mass: 527.616 g·mol^{−1}
- 3D model (JSmol): Interactive image
- SMILES: Cl.Cl.Cl.FC4(F)[C@@H]3c1ccccc1C(c2c(cccc2)[C@@H]34)N5CCN(CC5)C[C@@H](O)COc7c6cccnc6ccc7
- InChI: InChI=1S/C32H31F2N3O2/c33-32(34)29-22-7-1-3-9-24(22)31(25-10-4-2-8-23(25)30(29)32)37-17-15-36(16-18-37)19-21(38)20-39-28-13-5-12-27-26(28)11-6-14-35-27/h1-14,21,29-31,38H,15-20H2/t21-,29-,30+,31-/m1/s1; Key:IHOVFYSQUDPMCN-DBEBIPAYSA-N

Zosuquidar (development code LY-335979) is an experimental antineoplastic drug. Zosquidir inhibits P-glycoproteins. Other drugs with this mechanism include tariquidar and laniquidar. P-glycoproteins are trans-membrane proteins that pump foreign substances out of cells in an ATP dependent fashion. Cancers overexpressing P-glycoproteins are able to pump out therapeutic molecules before they are able to reach their target, effectively making the cancer multi-drug resistant. Zosuquidar inhibits P-glycoproteins, inhibiting the efflux pump and restoring sensitivity to chemotherapeutic agents.

Zosuqidar was initially characterized by Syntex Corporation, which was acquired by Roche in 1990. Roche licensed the drug to Eli Lilly in 1997. It was granted orphan drug status by the FDA in 2006 for AML. In 2010, it was announced that a phase III clinical trial for the treatment of acute myeloid leukemia (AML) and myelodysplastic syndrome did not meet its primary endpoint and Eli Lilly discontinued its development.

== Synthesis ==
Original: Improved: Also: Starting material:

When dibenzosuberone (1) is treated with difluorocarbene (generated in situ from lithium chlorodifluoroacetate), a cyclopropanation occurs to give 10,11-difluoromethanodibenzosuberone [167155-75-1] (2). Reduction of the ketone with borohydride proceeds to afford the derivative wherein the fused cyclpropyl and alcohol are on the same side of the seven-membered ring to give 1,1-Difluorocyclopropane Dibenzosuberol [797790-94-4]&[172925-68-7] (3). This is halogenated with 48% HBr to give the product where both groups are now positioned anti [312905-19-4] (4). Displacement of the bromide with pyrazine [290-37-9] gives the quat [312905-15-0] (5). Sodium borohydride was able to reduce the aromaticity in the sidechain giving the corresponding piperazine, i.e. Fb=[167155-78-4] HCl=PC9799090 (6). The reaction of 5-hydroxyquinoline [578-67-6] (7) with (R)-glycidyl nosylate (8) affords (R)-1-(5-Quinolinyloxy)-2,3-epoxypropane [123750-60-7] [118629-64-4] (8). The convergent synthesis between 6 and 9 giveszosuquidar in good yield.
