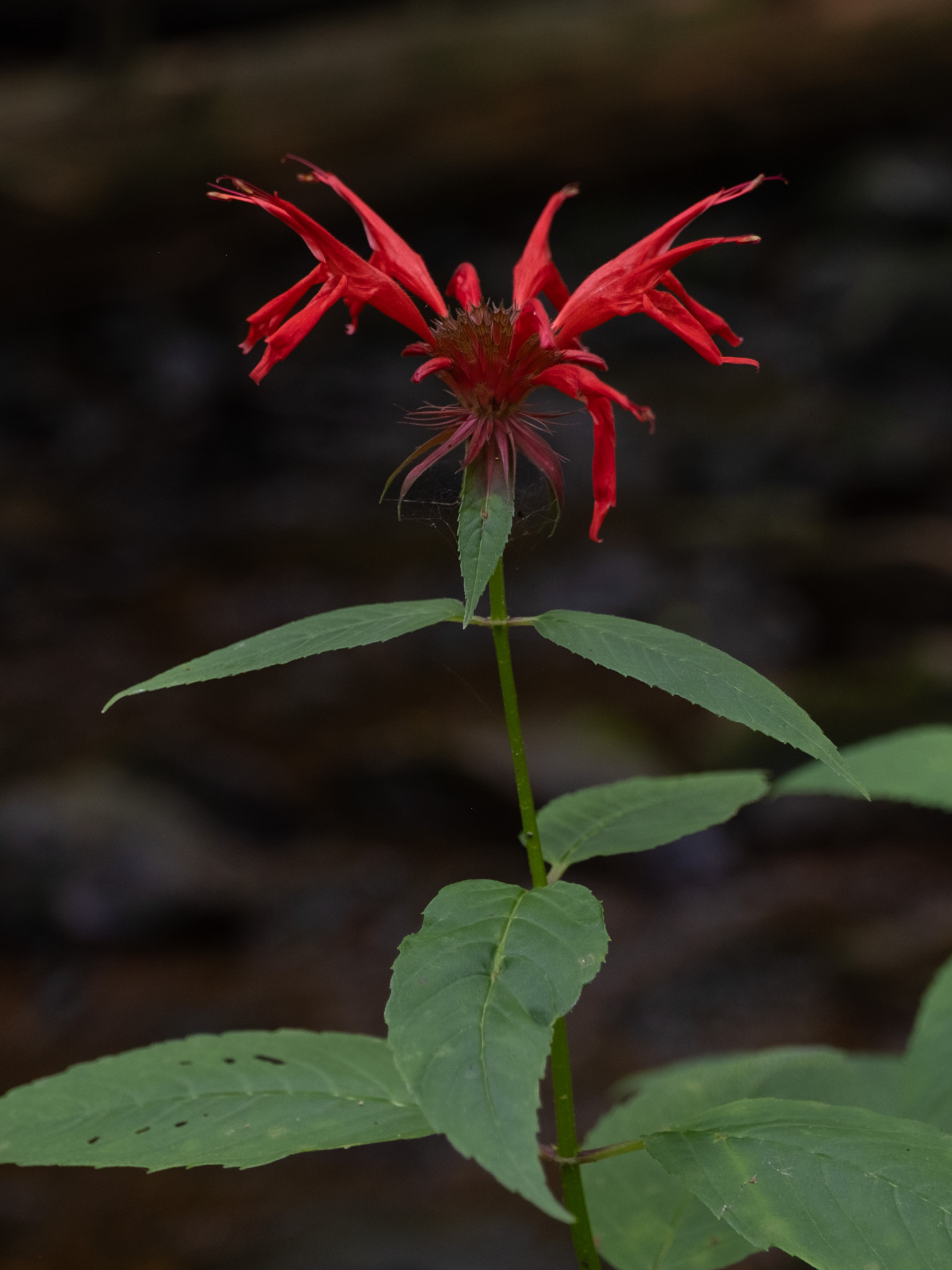

Scientific classification
- Kingdom: Plantae
- Clade: Tracheophytes
- Clade: Angiosperms
- Clade: Eudicots
- Clade: Asterids
- Order: Lamiales
- Family: Lamiaceae
- Genus: Monarda
- Species: M. didyma

Binomial name
- Monarda didyma L.
- U.S. distribution of Monarda didyma

= Monarda didyma =

Aromatic ornamental herb, Lamiaceae

Monarda didyma, the scarlet beebalm, crimson beebalm, scarlet monarda, Eau-de-Cologne plant, Oswego tea, or bergamot, is a North American aromatic herb in the family Lamiaceae.

== Description ==
Monarda didyma is a perennial plant that grows to 0.6–1.2 metres (2–4 feet) in height and spreads 0.4–0.6 m (1 1/2–2 ft). The medium to deep green leaves are 7–15 centimetres (3–6 inches) long, shaped ovate to ovate-lanceolate, with serrate margins, placed opposite on square, hollow stems. The leaves are minty fragrant when crushed. The plant's odor is similar to that of the bergamot orange (used to flavor Earl Grey tea).

The bright and red flowers are ragged, tubular and 3–4 cm (1–1 1/2 in) long, borne on showy heads of about 30 together, with reddish bracts. It grows in dense clusters along stream banks, moist thickets, and ditches, blooming for about 8 weeks from early to late summer.

== Taxonomy ==
The genus name comes from Nicolas Monardes, the first European to describe the American flora, in 1569.

== Distribution and habitat ==
The species is native to eastern North America from Maine west to Ontario and Michigan, and south to northern Georgia. It is naturalized further west in the United States and in parts of Europe.

== Ecology ==
This plant attracts pollinators, including bees, butterflies and hummingbirds. It is a larval host to the hermit sphinx, raspberry pyrausta, and orange mint moth.

== Uses ==
Scarlet beebalm is extensively grown as an ornamental plant, both within and outside its native range. It grows best in full sun, but tolerates light shade and thrives in any moist, but well-drained soil. Several cultivars have been selected for different flower color, ranging from white through pink to dark red and purple.

Monarda didyma has a long history of use as a medicinal plant by many Native Americans, including the Blackfoot. The Blackfoot people recognized this plant's strong antiseptic action, and used poultices of the plant for skin infections and minor wounds. In traditional medicine, preparations of the plant have been used for digestive and respiratory complaints. Monarda didyma contains the antiseptic thymol. Thymol is one of the active ingredients in some commercial mouthwash formulas containing essential oils. The Ho-Chunk used an herbal tea made from beebalm as a general stimulant. It was also used as a carminative herb by Native Americans to treat excessive flatulence. The Native Americans of Oswego, New York, made the leaves into a tea, giving the plant one of its common names. Following the Boston Tea Party of 1773 and the boycott of imported tea, colonists used the leaves as a tea substitute.

The leaves and flowers are used to prepare herbal tea and syrups. Fresh leaves and flowers are also used to flavor salads.

The leaves contain the flavonoids didymin and linarin. The essential oil contains thymol and carvacrol, with its composition varying between chemotypes and growing conditions.

Laboratory studies have examined the biological activity of the essential oil. A 2022 study reported antioxidant activity in a chemical assay and reduced expression of the inflammatory mediator interleukin 6 in cultured human monocytic cells. A 2026 study found that essential oils from leaves, flowers and aerial parts inhibited the growth of bacteria and yeasts in laboratory tests.

In cell cultures, a didymin containing leaf extract reduced protein oxidation and markers of cellular senescence. The randomized, double-blind, placebo-controlled trial involved 81 adults aged 45 to 65 who received 100 mg of the extract daily or placebo for 12 weeks. At the end of the trial, the authors reported a telomere protecting effect and lower DNA methylation age in the extract group compared to the placebo group but had limited conclusions about long-term effects. A 2026 systematic review of human studies on natural-product-derived antioxidants included this trial. The review noted that changes in DNA methylation-based age do not necessarily indicate a lasting slowing of biological aging and called for adequately powered randomized trials linking these measures to functional and clinical outcomes.

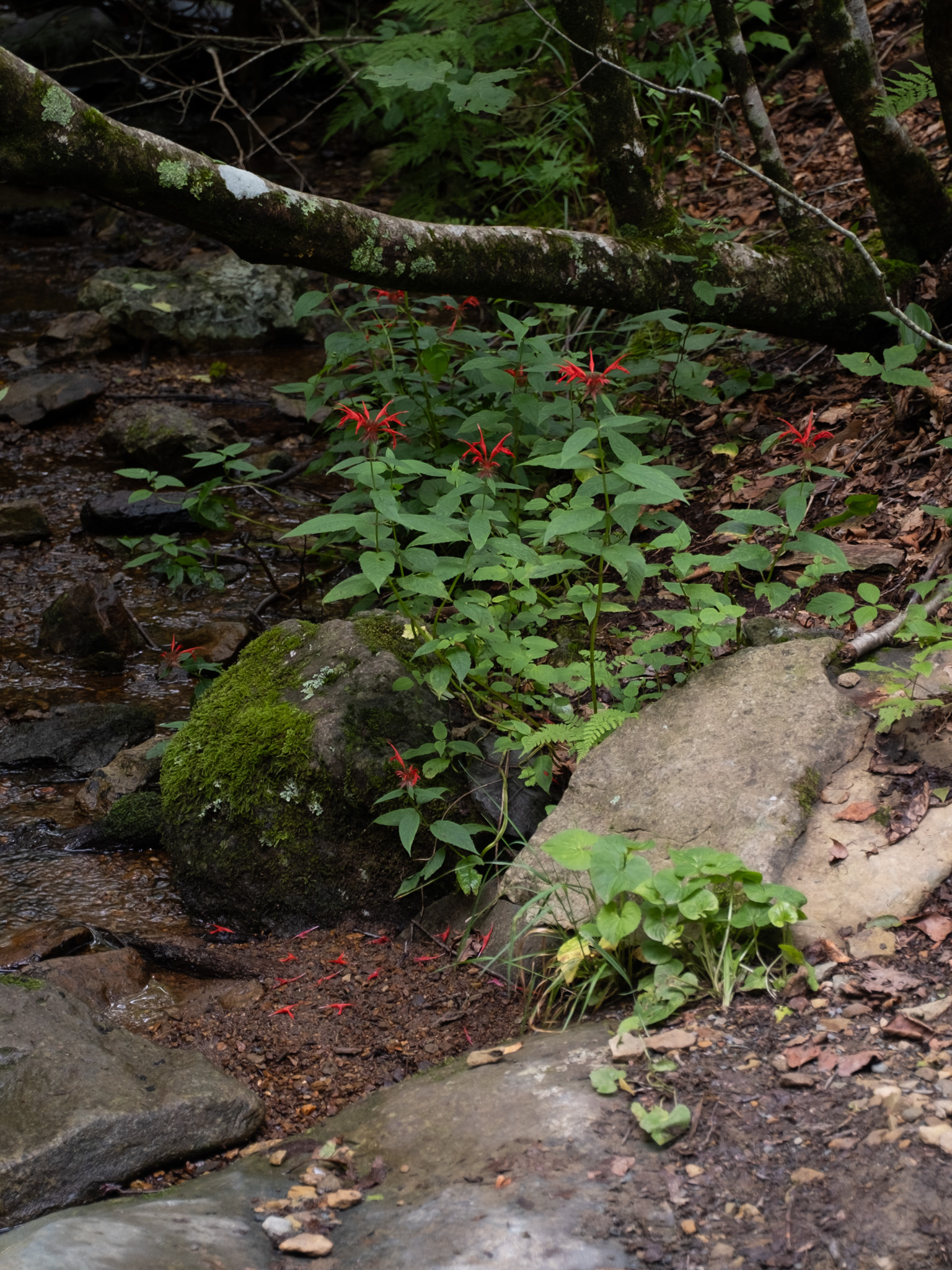
Beebalm near a stream

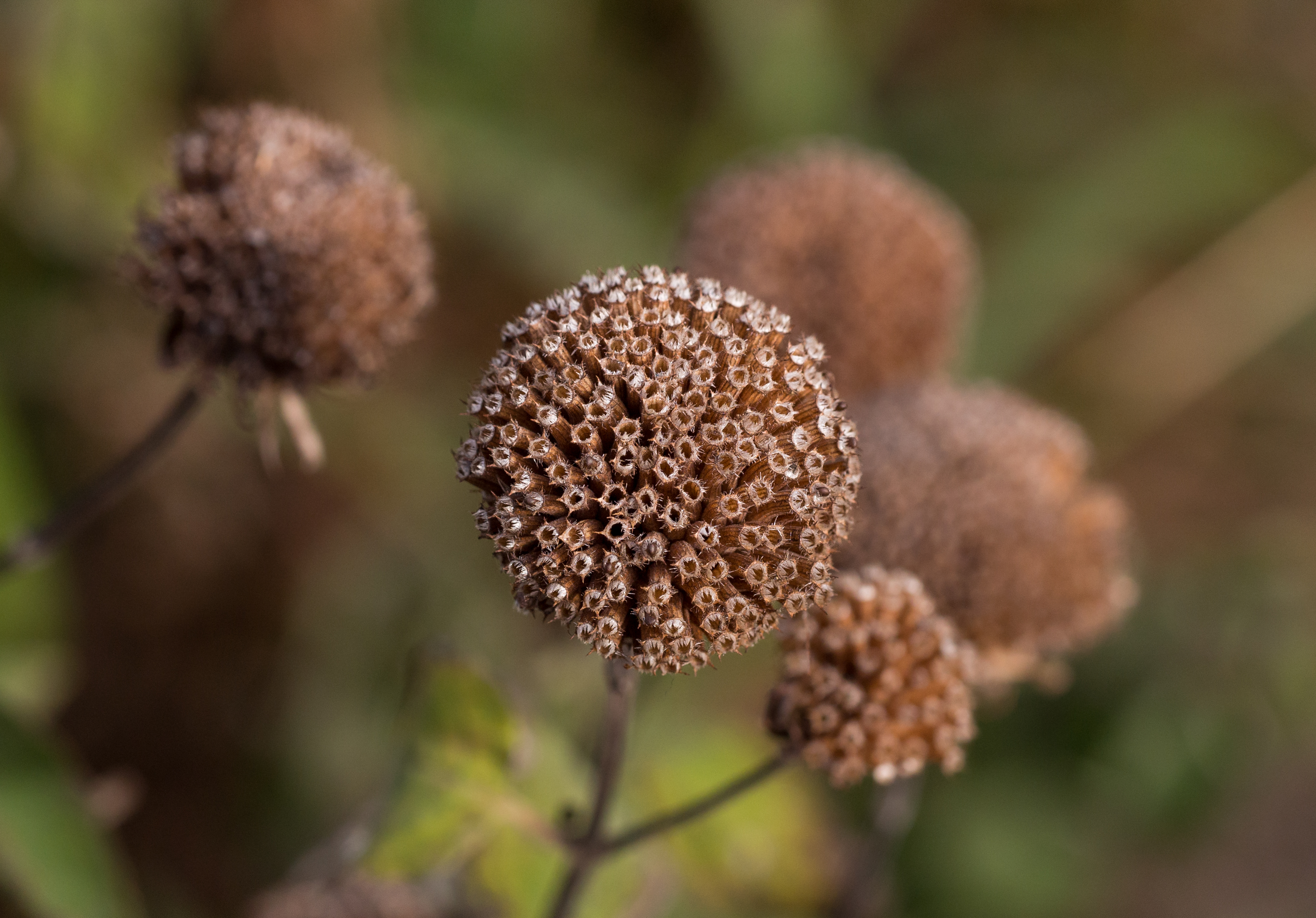
Seed head

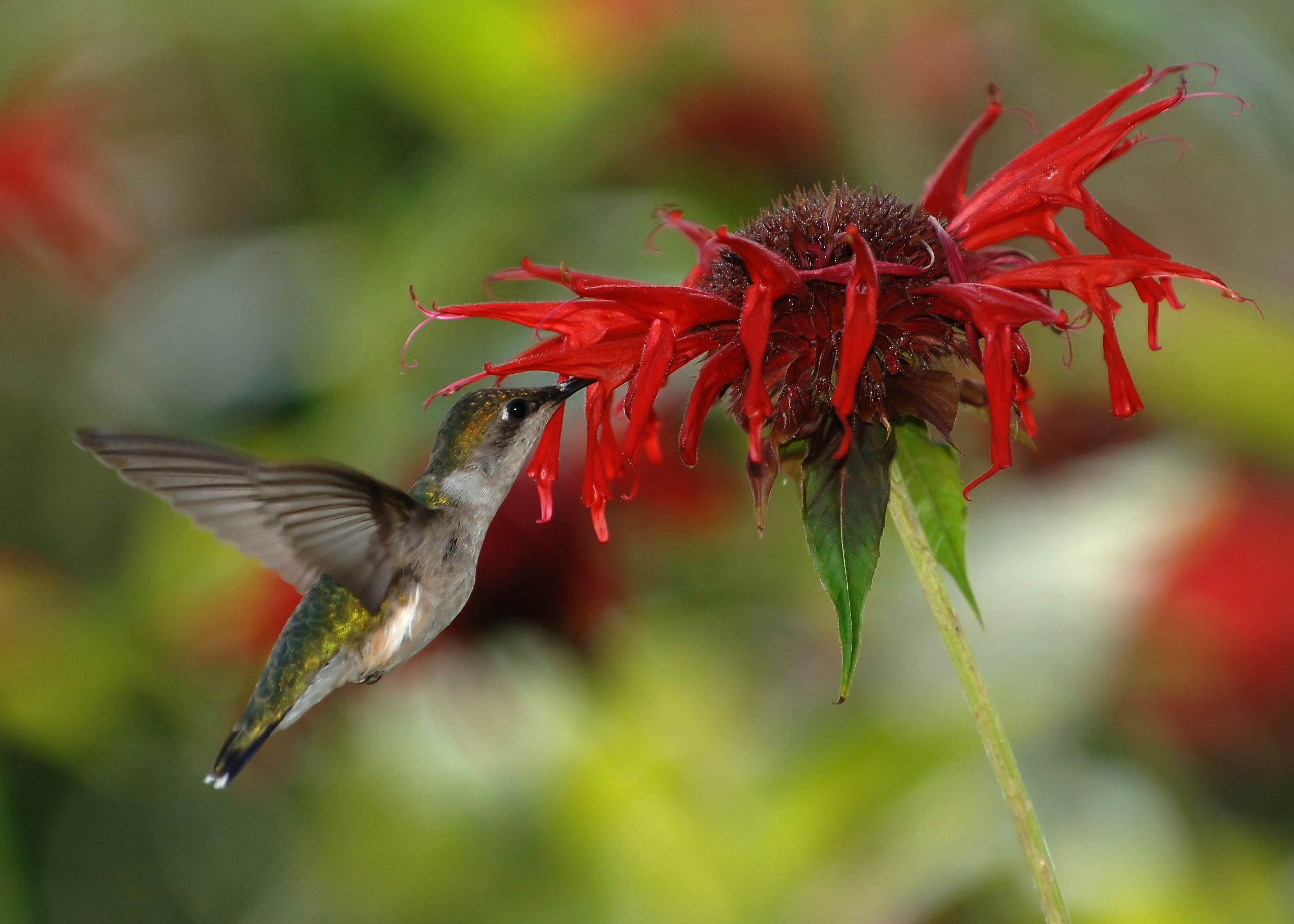
Visited by a hummingbird

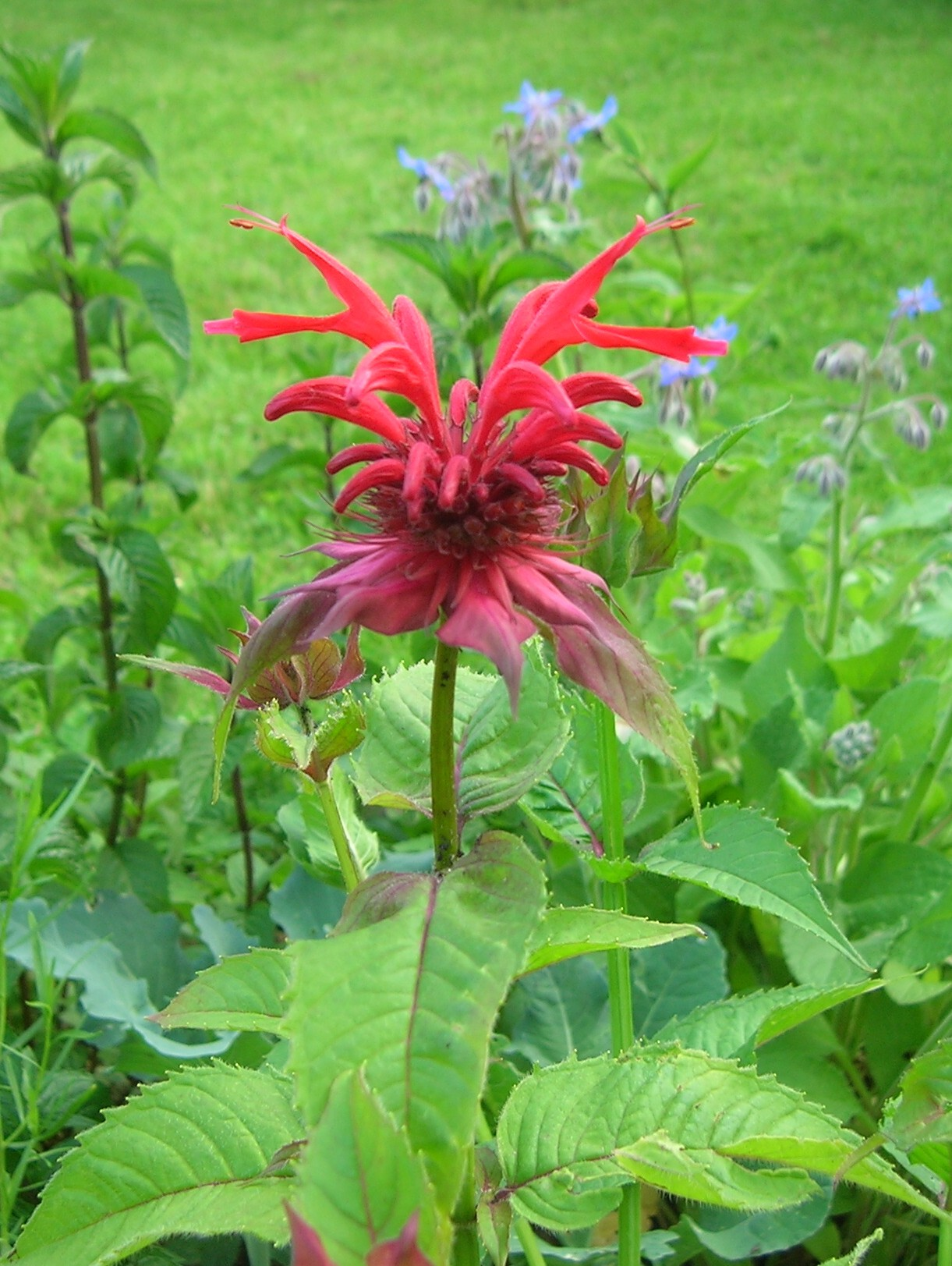
