= C63H111N11O12 =

The molecular formula C_{63}H_{111}N_{11}O_{12} (molar mass: 1214.622 g/mol) may refer to:

- Valspodar (PSC833)
- Voclosporin
