= Isosakuranetin =

- Isosakuranetin

Names
- IUPAC name (2S)-5,7-Dihydroxy-4′-methoxyflavan-4-one
- Systematic IUPAC name (2S)-5,7-Dihydroxy-2-(4-methoxyphenyl)-2,3-dihydro-4H-1-benzopyran-4-one
- Other names 4'-Methylnaringenin; Ponciretin

Identifiers
CAS Number	480-43-3
3D model (JSmol)	Interactive image
ChEMBL	ChEMBL470266
ChemSpider	141023
ECHA InfoCard	100.006.866
KEGG	C05334
PubChem CID	160481
UNII	U02X7TF8UA
CompTox Dashboard (EPA)	DTXSID60963980
- InChI: InChI=1S/C16H14O5/c1-20-11-4-2-9(3-5-11)14-8-13(19)16-12(18)6-10(17)7-15(16)21-14/h2-7,14,17-18H,8H2,1H3/t14-/m0/s1 Key: HMUJXQRRKBLVOO-AWEZNQCLSA-N
- SMILES: COC1=CC=C(C=C1)C2CC(=O)C3=C(C=C(C=C3O2)O)O

Properties
Chemical formula	C_{16}H_{14}O_{5}
Molar mass	286.27 g/mol
- Except where otherwise noted, data are given for materials in their standard state (at 25 °C [77 °F], 100 kPa). Infobox references

Isosakuranetin, an O-methylated flavonoid, is the 4'-methoxy derivative of naringenin, a flavanone. Didymin, a disaccharide of isosakuranetin, occurs e.g. in scarlet beebalm, sweet orange, blood orange and mandarin. Isosakuranetin is a potent inhibitor of TRPM3 channels.

== Biosynthesis ==
In soybean, isosakuranetin is biosynthesised from naringenin in a methylation reaction catalysed by the enzyme flavonoid 4'-O-methyltransferase. The methyl group comes from the cofactor, S-adenosyl methionine (SAM)

naringenin
+ SAM
isosakuranetin
+ SAH

== Glycosides ==
- Poncirin is the 7-O-neohesperidoside of isosakuranetin.
- Didymin is the 7-O-rutinoside of isosakuranetin
