= Hans Andersag =

German chemist (1902–1955)

- Born: Johann Andersag; February 16, 1902; Lana, Tyrol, Austria-Hungary (now South Tyrol, Italy)
- Died: August 10, 1955 (aged 53); Wuppertal, West Germany

Hans Andersag was a German chemist (1902–1955). While working for Bayer AG, he discovered chloroquine, the active ingredient in the malaria drug Resochin. He also first synthesized vitamin B_{6} with Richard Kuhn, Kurt Westphal, and Gerhardt Wendt.

== Education and life ==
He was awarded a doctorate degree for his dissertation Synthese des natürlichen Koproporphyrins sowie zweier damit isomerer Porphyrine at the Technical University of Munich on September 9, 1927.

He was married to Else Andersag (née Nouvortne). The couple lived with their three daughters Christel, Marianne and Renate on Jaegerhofstrasse 44 in Wuppertal-Elberfeld. Hans Andersag died from bronchial cancer. His grave and gravestone are located at the Alter Lutherischer Friedhof an der Hochstrasse in Wuppertal-Elberfeld.

== See also ==
- History of malaria

== Pictures ==
Gravestone of Hans Andersag, his wife Else and youngest daughter Renate

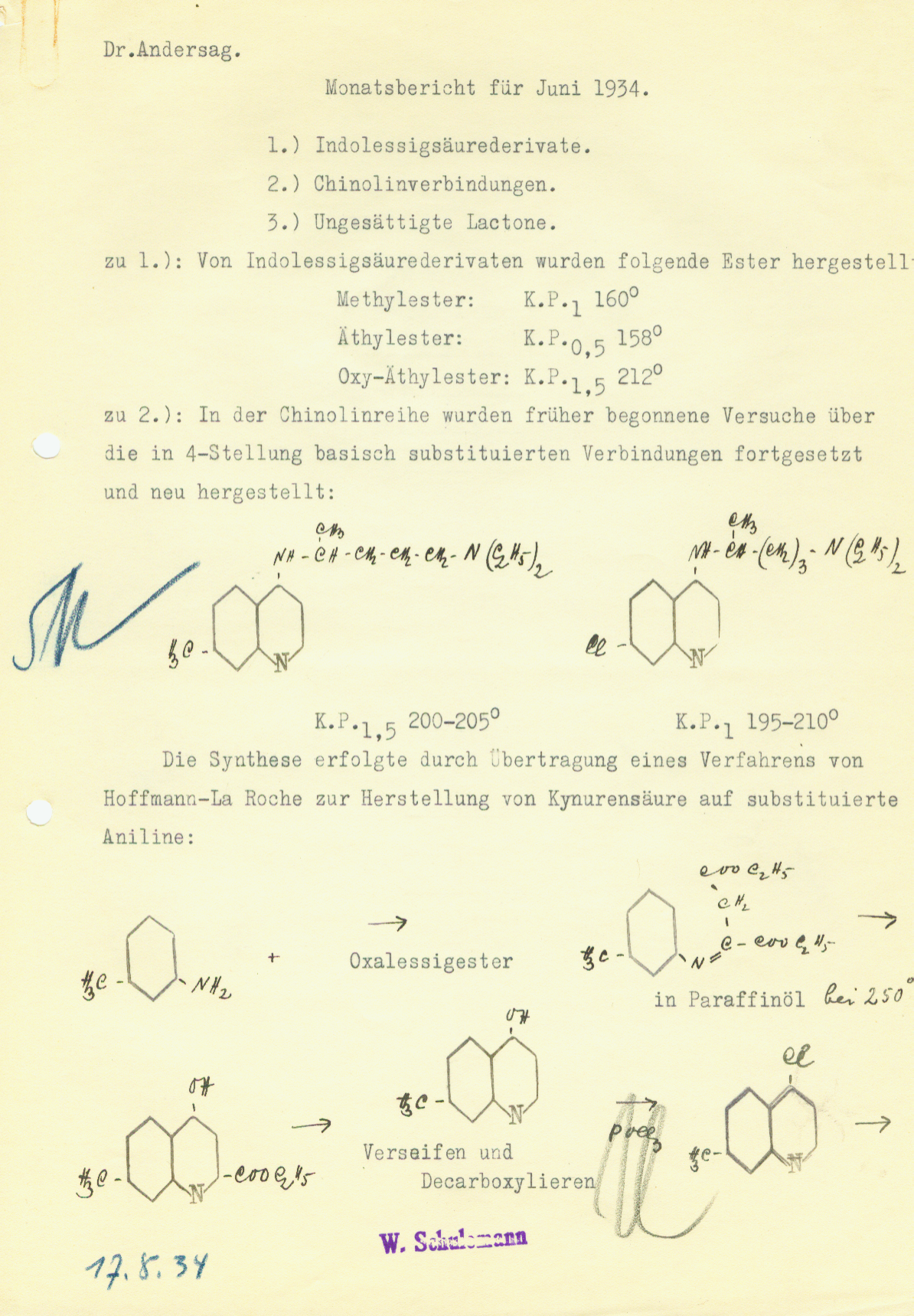
Protocol for the synthesis of Resochin, Hans Andersag 1934
