= Laniquidar =

Chemical compound

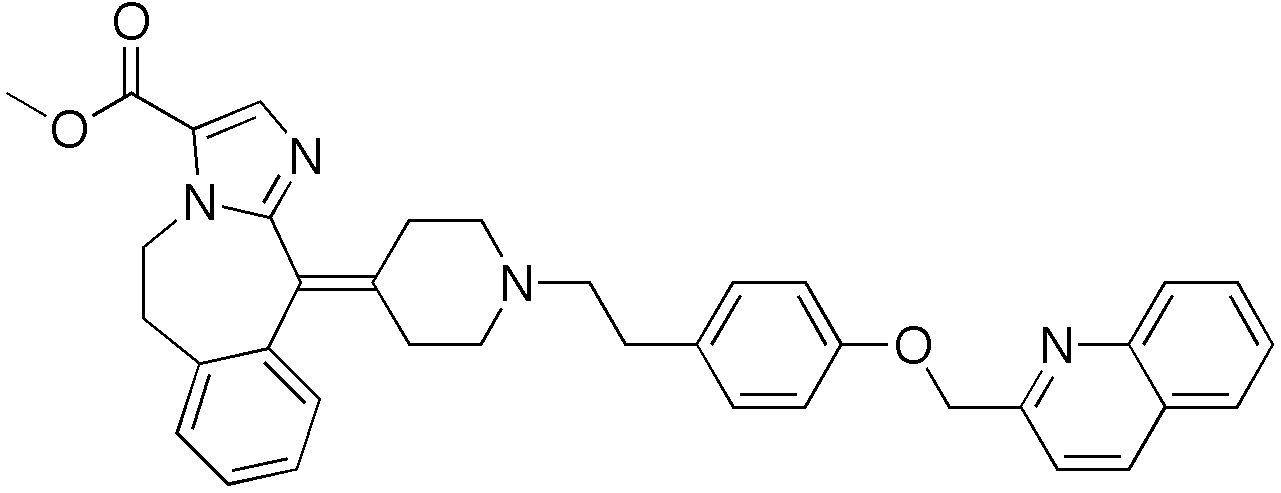

Clinical data
- ATC code: none

Identifiers
- IUPAC name: methyl 11-(1-{2-[4-(quinolin-2-ylmethoxy)phenyl]ethyl}piperidin-4-ylidene)-6,11-dihydro-5H-imidazo[2,1-b][3]benzazepine-3-carboxylate
- CAS Number: 197509-46-9
- PubChem CID: 6450806
- ChemSpider: 4953357
- UNII: K3FRN4DDOY
- CompTox Dashboard (EPA): DTXSID10173436

Chemical and physical data
- Formula: C_{37}H_{36}N_{4}O_{3}
- Molar mass: 584.720 g·mol^{−1}
- 3D model (JSmol): Interactive image
- SMILES: COC(=O)C1=CN=C2N1CCC3=CC=CC=C3C2=C4CCN(CC4)CCC5=CC=C(C=C5)OCC6=NC7=CC=CC=C7C=C6
- InChI: InChI=1S/C37H36N4O3/c1-43-37(42)34-24-38-36-35(32-8-4-2-6-27(32)19-23-41(34)36)29-17-21-40(22-18-29)20-16-26-10-14-31(15-11-26)44-25-30-13-12-28-7-3-5-9-33(28)39-30/h2-15,24H,16-23,25H2,1H3; Key:TULGGJGJQXESOO-UHFFFAOYSA-N

Laniquidar (INN) is a third generation P-glycoprotein inhibitor that underwent clinical studies for acute myeloid leukemia (AML) and myelodysplastic syndrome (MDS). It has been discontinued because of its low bioavailability and a high variability with how the patients responded to the drug.

== Clinical Trials ==
Laniquidar has been tested for its efficacy for treating refractory breast cancer together with docetaxel and paclitaxel. Phase 2 clinical trials began in September 2001 by the European Organization for Research and Treatment of Cancer (EORTC) which included 35 participants. These patients have not responded to prior chemotherapy treatments. The study ended in June 2002 but the results have not been reported.

== Chemistry ==
Laniquidar is a benzazepine. The chemical name for Laniquidar is methyl 11-(1-(4-quinolin-2-ylmethoxy)phenethyl)piperidin-4ylidene)-6,11-dihydro-5H-benzo[d]imidazo[1,2-a]azepine-3-carboxylate and its free base form has a chemical formula of C_{37}H_{36}N_{4}O_{3} with a molecular weight of 584.720 g/mol.

== Mechanism of Action ==
Laniquidar is a highly selective P-Glycoprotein (P-gp) inhibitor that also has a high lipophilicity. P-gp is a mulit-drug resistant protein that causes the efflux of substrates such as chemotherapeutic drugs out of the cell. Laniquidar works to inhibit the efflux by causing a conformational change of P-gp. This hinders ATP hydrolysis and the substrate can not be positioned to leave the cell since the permeability of the cell membrane decreases.
