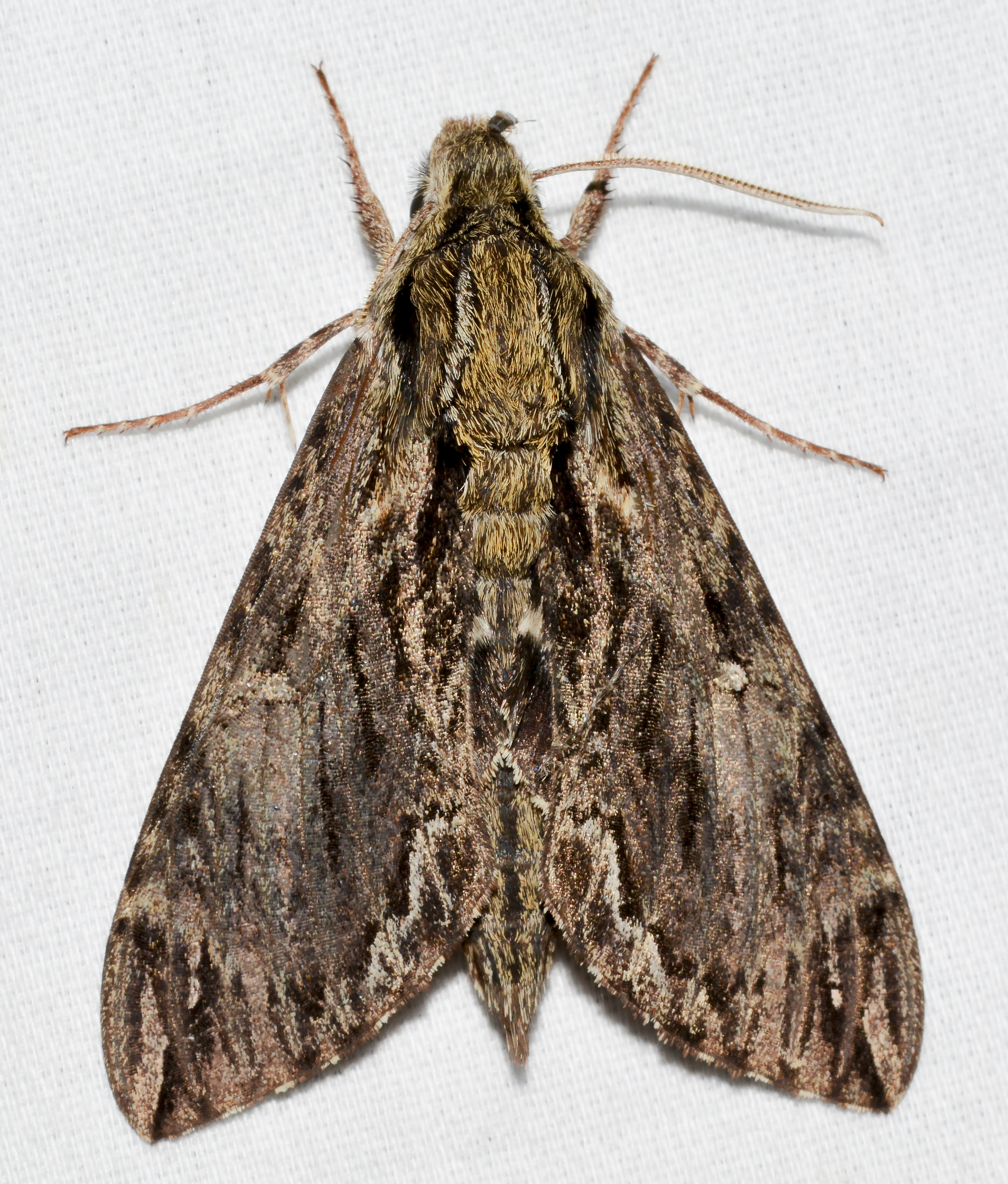

Scientific classification
- Domain: Eukaryota
- Kingdom: Animalia
- Phylum: Arthropoda
- Class: Insecta
- Order: Lepidoptera
- Family: Sphingidae
- Genus: Lintneria
- Species: L. eremitus

Binomial name
- Lintneria eremitus (Hübner, 1823)

Synonyms
- Sphinx eremitus; Agrius eremitus Hübner, 1823; Sphinx sordida Harris, 1839; Sphinx eremitus mccrearyi Clark, 1929

= Lintneria eremitus =

Hermit sphinx

Species of moth

Lintneria eremitus, the hermit sphinx, is a moth of the family Sphingidae. The species was first described by Jacob Hübner in 1823. It is found in the temperate areas of the eastern United States, north into southern Canada over the Great Plains. It prefers gardens and yards, but is common wherever the nectar and larval host plants are found. This moth is easily confused with the Canadian sphinx (Sphinx canadensis) but these two moths do not typically co-occur.

The wingspan is 65–75 mm. There is one generation per year with adults on wing from late June to August. They nectar at deep-throated, light-colored flowers such as phlox (Phlox species) or milkweed (Asclepias species). Adults typically fly at dusk. They are easily attracted to light.

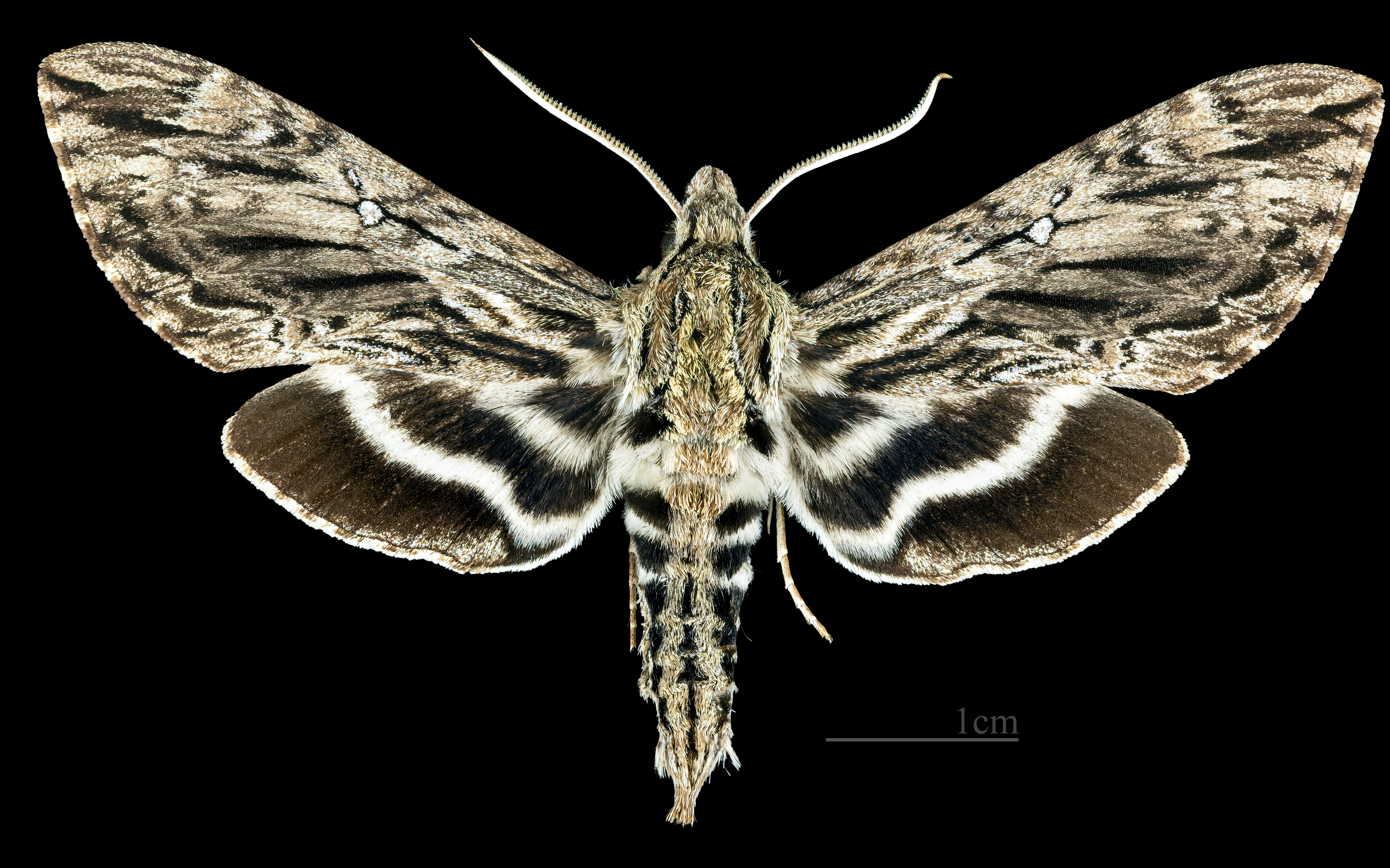
Lintneria eremitus ♂

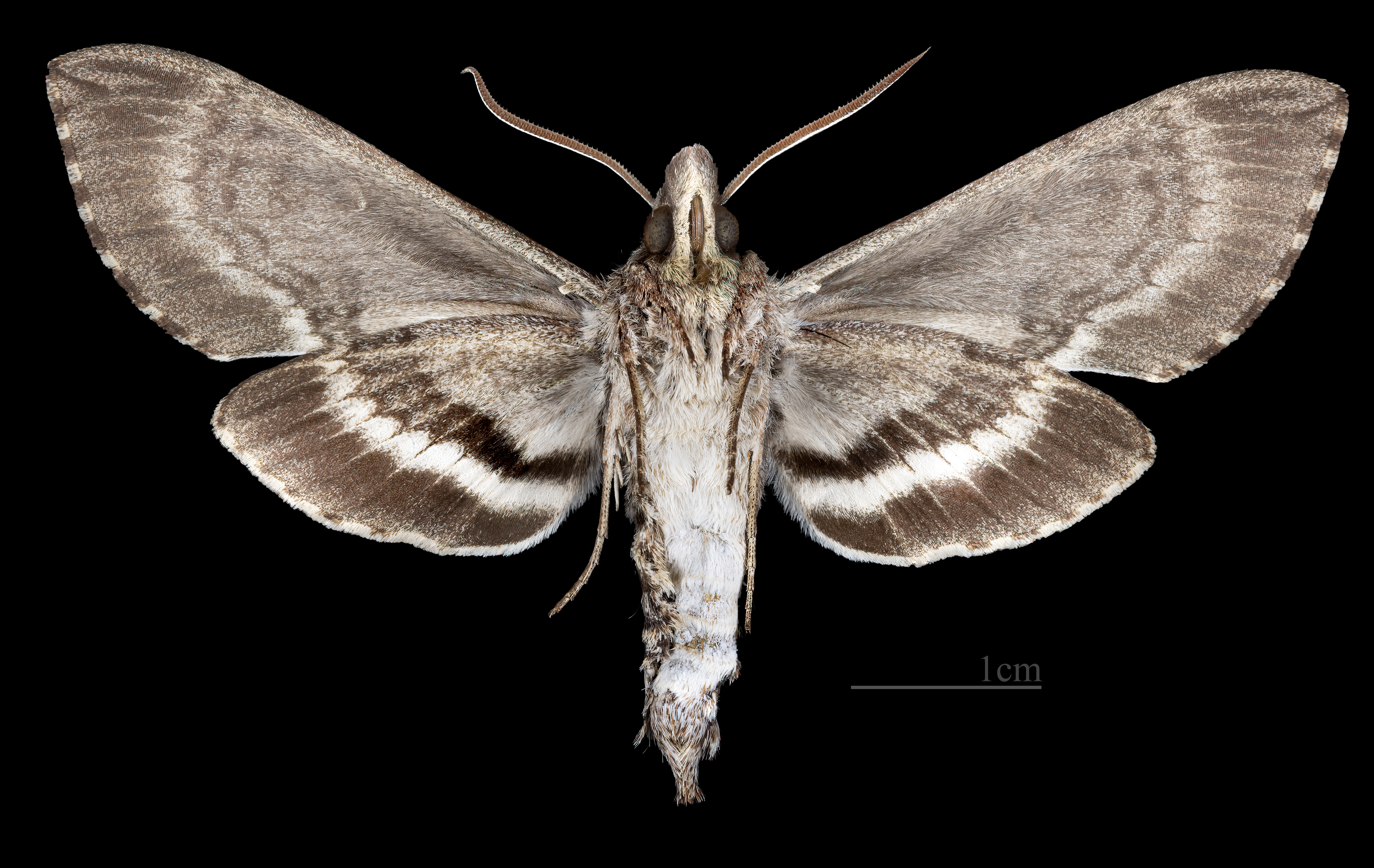
Lintneria eremitus ♂ △

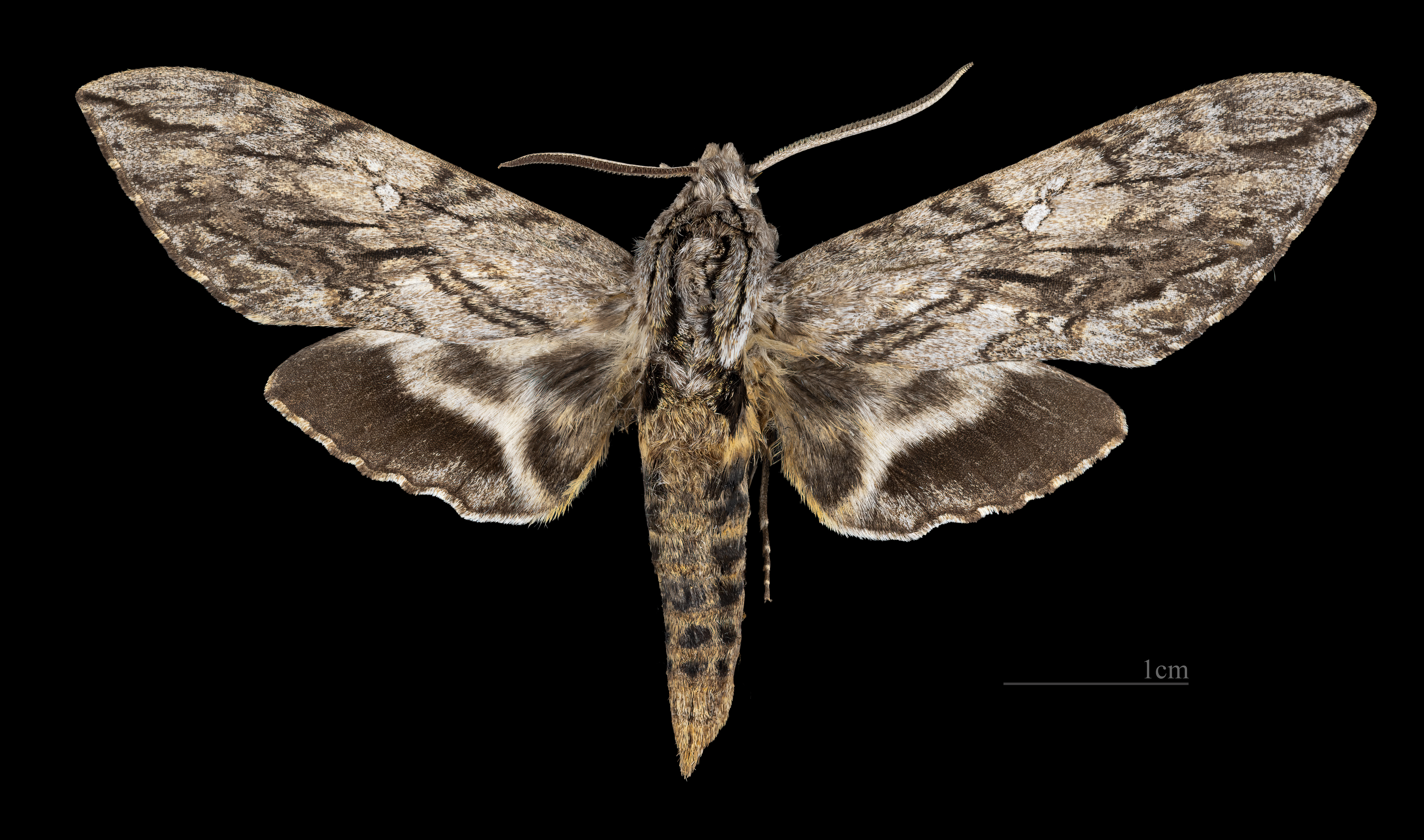
Lintneria eremitus ♀

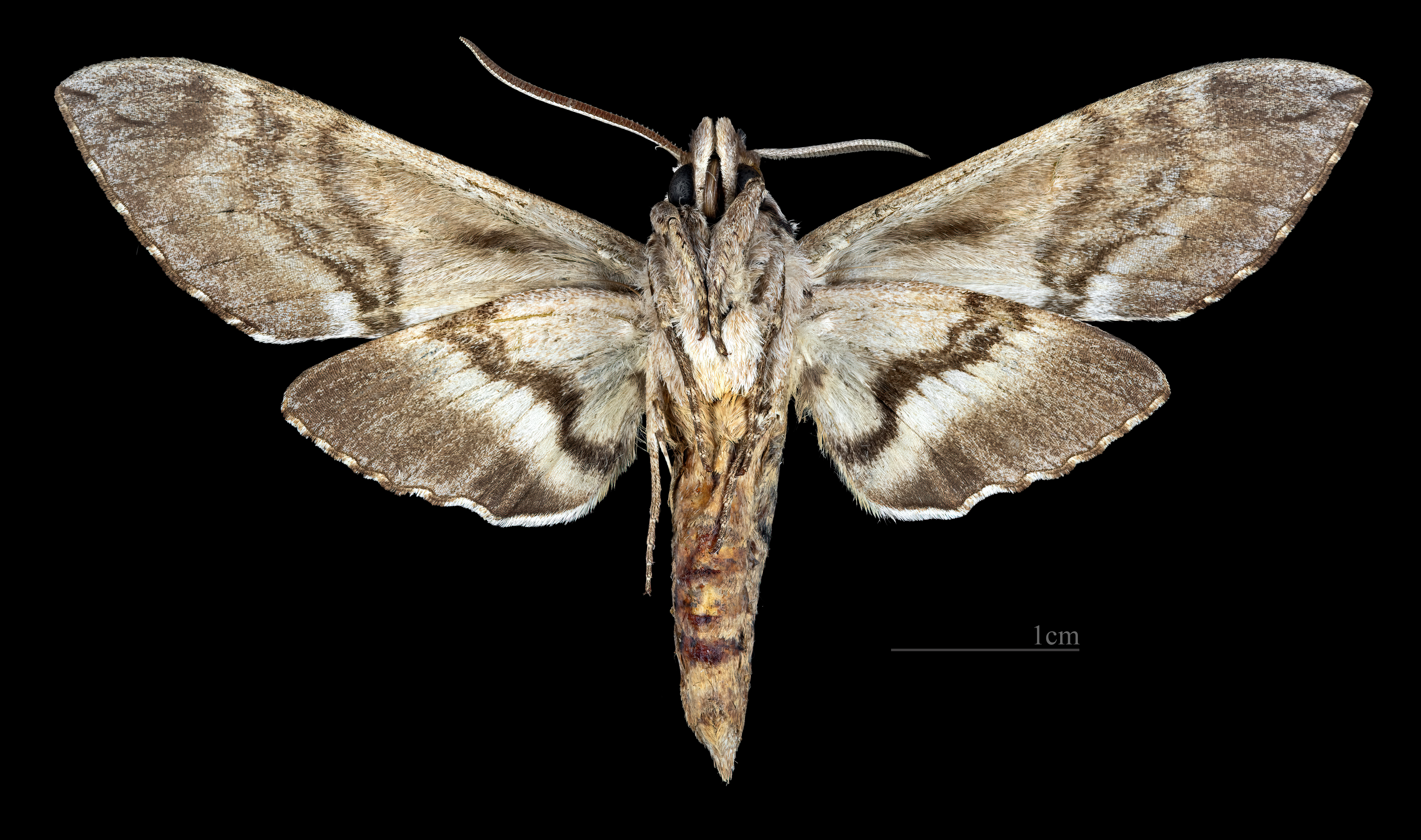
Lintneria eremitus ♀ △

The larvae feed on many plants in the family Lamiaceae, such as Lycopus, Mentha, Monarda and Salvia species. Larvae have green, black, or brown coloration.
