= Valspodar =

Names
- IUPAC name (3S,6S,9S,12R,15S,18S,21S,24S,30S,33S)-6,9,18,24-Tetraisobutyl-3,21,30-triisopropyl-1,4,7,10,12,15,19,25,28-nonamethyl-33-[(2R,4E)-2-methyl-4-hexenoyl]-1,4,7,10,13,16,19,22,25,28,31-undecaazacyclotritriacontane-2,5,8,11,14,17,20,23,26,29,32-undecone
- Other names PSC833; PSC-833

Identifiers
CAS Number	121584-18-7
3D model (JSmol)	Interactive image
ChemSpider	4445174
PubChem CID	5281884
UNII	Q7ZP55KF3X
CompTox Dashboard (EPA)	DTXSID90873386
- InChI: InChI=1S/C63H111N11O12/c1-26-27-28-41(16)53(76)52-57(80)67-49(38(10)11)61(84)68(19)33-48(75)69(20)44(29-34(2)3)56(79)66-50(39(12)13)62(85)70(21)45(30-35(4)5)55(78)64-42(17)54(77)65-43(18)58(81)71(22)46(31-36(6)7)59(82)72(23)47(32-37(8)9)60(83)73(24)51(40(14)15)63(86)74(52)25/h26-27,34-47,49-52H,28-33H2,1-25H3,(H,64,78)(H,65,77)(H,66,79)(H,67,80)/b27-26+/t41-,42+,43-,44+,45+,46+,47+,49+,50+,51+,52+/m1/s1 Key: YJDYDFNKCBANTM-QCWCSKBGSA-N; InChI=1/C63H111N11O12/c1-26-27-28-41(16)53(76)52-57(80)67-49(38(10)11)61(84)68(19)33-48(75)69(20)44(29-34(2)3)56(79)66-50(39(12)13)62(85)70(21)45(30-35(4)5)55(78)64-42(17)54(77)65-43(18)58(81)71(22)46(31-36(6)7)59(82)72(23)47(32-37(8)9)60(83)73(24)51(40(14)15)63(86)74(52)25/h26-27,34-47,49-52H,28-33H2,1-25H3,(H,64,78)(H,65,77)(H,66,79)(H,67,80)/b27-26+/t41-,42+,43-,44+,45+,46+,47+,49+,50+,51+,52+/m1/s1 Key: YJDYDFNKCBANTM-QCWCSKBGBB
- SMILES: C/C=C/C[C@@H](C)C(=O)[C@H]1C(=O)N[C@H](C(=O)N(CC(=O)N([C@H](C(=O)N[C@H](C(=O)N([C@H](C(=O)N[C@H](C(=O)N[C@@H](C(=O)N([C@H](C(=O)N([C@H](C(=O)N([C@H](C(=O)N1C)C(C)C)C)CC(C)C)C)CC(C)C)C)C)C)CC(C)C)C)C(C)C)CC(C)C)C)C)C(C)C

Properties
Chemical formula	C_{63}H_{111}N_{11}O_{12}
Molar mass	1214.646 g·mol^{−1}
- Except where otherwise noted, data are given for materials in their standard state (at 25 °C [77 °F], 100 kPa). Infobox references

Valspodar (PSC833) is an experimental cancer treatment and chemosensitizer. It is a derivative of ciclosporin D (cyclosporin D).

Its primary use is as an inhibitor of the efflux transporter P-glycoprotein. Previous studies in animal models have found it to be effective at preventing cancer cell resistance to chemotherapeutics, but these findings did not translate to clinical success.

== Adverse effects ==
Valspodar can cause nerve damage.
