= P-glycoprotein =

Protein found in humans

ABCB1
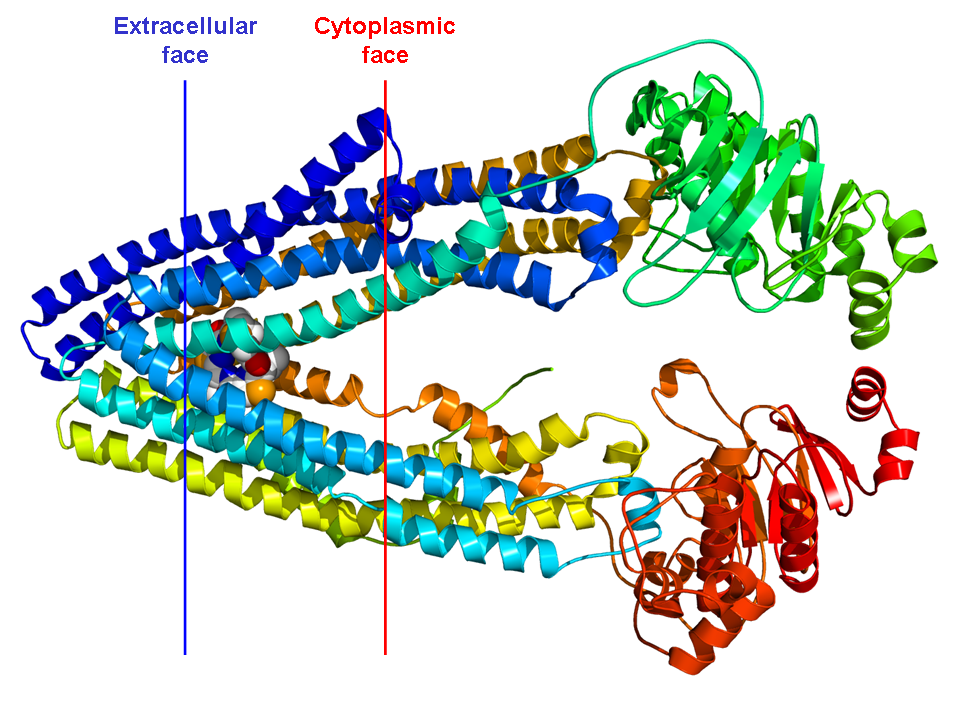

Identifiers
- Aliases: ABCB1, ABC20, CD243, CLCS, GP170, MDR1, P-GP, PGY1, ATP binding cassette subfamily B member 1, P-glycoprotein, P-gp, Pgp
- External IDs: OMIM: 171050; MGI: 97570; GeneCards: ABCB1
Enzyme activity
EC #	BRENDA	ExPASy	KEGG	MetaCyc
7.6.2.1	↗	↗	↗	↗
7.6.2.2	↗	↗	↗	↗

Gene location (Mouse)
Chr.	Chromosome 5 (mouse)
Band	5 A1|5 3.43 cM	Start	8,710,077 bp
Band	5 A1|5 3.43 cM	End	8,798,575 bp
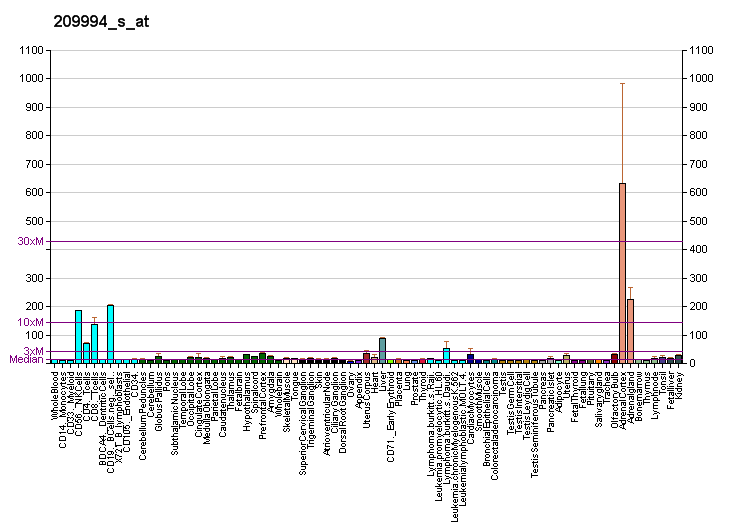

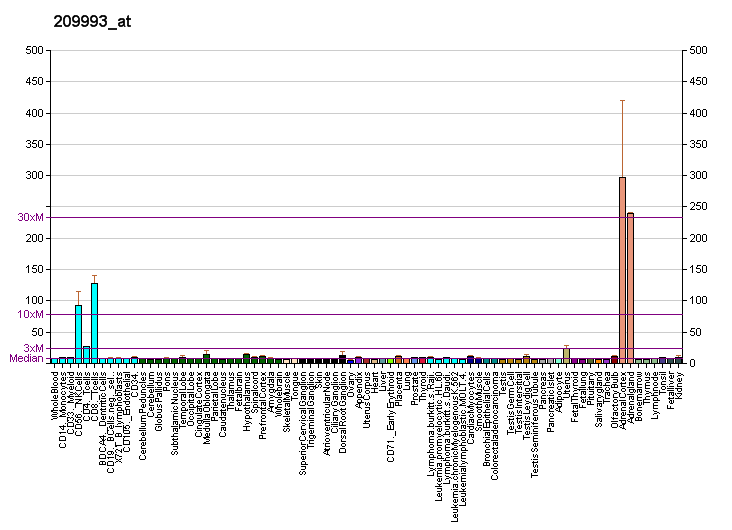
RNA expression pattern
Bgee	Human / Mouse (ortholog); n/a / Top expressed in: left colon; iris; Paneth cell; jejunum; crypt of lieberkuhn of small intestine; ileum; gallbladder; ciliary body; intestinal villus; substantia nigra
BioGPS	More reference expression data
Gene ontology
Molecular function	ATPase-coupled transmembrane transporter activity; nucleotide binding; transporter activity; ATPase activity; protein binding; hydrolase activity; ATP binding; ABC-type xenobiotic transporter activity; phosphatidylethanolamine flippase activity; phosphatidylcholine floppase activity; ceramide floppase activity
Cellular component	integral component of membrane; membrane; plasma membrane; cell surface; extracellular exosome; apical plasma membrane
Biological process	stem cell proliferation; xenobiotic transport; G2/M transition of mitotic cell cycle; transmembrane transport; phospholipid translocation; xenobiotic transmembrane transport; ceramide translocation; regulation of response to osmotic stress; positive regulation of anion channel activity; regulation of chloride transport; transport
Sources:Amigo / QuickGO
Orthologs
Databases	NCBI: entry; OMA: entry
Species	Human	Mouse
Entrez	5243	18671
Ensembl	ENSG00000085563	ENSMUSG00000040584
UniProt	P08183	P21447
RefSeq (mRNA)	NM_000927	NM_011076
RefSeq (protein)	NP_000918; NP_001335873; NP_001335874; NP_001335875	NP_035206
Location (UCSC)	n/a	Chr 5: 8.71 – 8.8 Mb
PubMed search
- Wikidata
View/Edit Human	View/Edit Mouse

P-glycoprotein 1 (permeability glycoprotein, abbreviated as P-gp or Pgp) also known as multidrug resistance protein 1 (MDR1) or ATP-binding cassette sub-family B member 1 (ABCB1) or cluster of differentiation 243 (CD243) is an important protein of the cell membrane that pumps many foreign substances out of cells. More formally, it is an ATP-dependent efflux pump with broad substrate specificity. It exists in animals, fungi, and bacteria, and it likely evolved as a defense mechanism against harmful substances.

P-gp is extensively distributed and expressed in the intestinal epithelium where it pumps xenobiotics (such as toxins or drugs) back into the intestinal lumen, in liver cells where it pumps them into bile ducts, in the cells of the proximal tubule of the kidney where it pumps them into urinary filtrate (in the proximal tubule), and in the capillary endothelial cells composing the blood–brain barrier and blood–testis barrier, where it pumps them back into the capillaries.

P-gp is a glycoprotein that in humans is encoded by the ABCB1 gene. P-gp is a well-characterized ABC-transporter (which transports a wide variety of substrates across extra- and intracellular membranes) of the MDR/TAP subfamily. The normal excretion of xenobiotics back into the gut lumen by P-gp pharmacokinetically reduces the efficacy of some pharmaceutical drugs (which are said to be P-gp substrates). In addition, some cancer cells also express large amounts of P-gp, further amplifying that effect and rendering these cancers multidrug resistant. Many drugs inhibit P-gp, typically incidentally rather than as their main mechanism of action; some foods do as well. Any such substance can sometimes be called a P-gp inhibitor.

P-gp was discovered in 1971 by Victor Ling.

== Gene ==
A 2015 review of polymorphisms in ABCB1 found that "the effect of ABCB1 variation on P-glycoprotein expression (messenger RNA and protein expression) and/or activity in various tissues (e.g. the liver, gut and heart) appears to be small. Although polymorphisms and haplotypes of ABCB1 have been associated with alterations in drug disposition and drug response, including adverse events with various ABCB1 substrates in different ethnic populations, the results have been majorly conflicting, with limited clinical relevance."

== Protein ==
P-gp is a 170 kDa transmembrane glycoprotein, which includes 10–15 kDa of N-terminal glycosylation. The N-terminal half of the protein contains six transmembrane helixes, followed by a large cytoplasmic domain with an ATP-binding site, and then a second section with six transmembrane helixes and an ATP-binding domain that shows over 65% of amino acid similarity with the first half of the polypeptide. In 2009, the first structure of a mammalian P-glycoprotein was solved (3G5U). The structure was derived from the mouse MDR3 gene product heterologously expressed in Pichia pastoris yeast. The structure of mouse P-gp is similar to structures of the bacterial ABC transporter MsbA (3B5W and 3B5X) that adopt an inward facing conformation that is believed to be important for binding substrate along the inner leaflet of the membrane. Additional structures (3G60 and 3G61) of P-gp were also solved revealing the binding site(s) of two different cyclic peptide substrate/inhibitors. The promiscuous binding pocket of P-gp is lined with aromatic amino acid side chains.

Through Molecular Dynamic (MD) simulations, this sequence was proved to have a direct impact in the transporter's structural stability (in the nucleotide-binding domains) and defining a lower boundary for the internal drug-binding pocket.

== Species, tissue, and subcellular distribution ==
P-gp is expressed primarily in certain cell types in the liver, pancreas, kidney, colon, and jejunum. P-gp is also found in brain capillary endothelial cells.

== Function ==
The substrate enters P-gp either from an opening within the inner leaflet of the membrane or from an opening at the cytoplasmic side of the protein. ATP binds at the cytoplasmic side of the protein. Following binding of each, ATP hydrolysis shifts the substrate into a position to be excreted from the cell. Release of the phosphate (from the original ATP molecule) occurs concurrently with substrate excretion. ADP is released, and a new molecule of ATP binds to the secondary ATP-binding site. Hydrolysis and release of ADP and a phosphate molecule resets the protein, so that the process can start again.

The protein belongs to the superfamily of ATP-binding cassette (ABC) transporters. ABC proteins transport various molecules across extra- and intra-cellular membranes. ABC genes are divided into seven distinct subfamilies (ABC1, MDR/TAP, MRP, ALD, OABP, GCN20, White). This protein is a member of the MDR/TAP subfamily. Members of the MDR/TAP subfamily are involved in multidrug resistance. P-gp is an ATP-dependent drug efflux pump for xenobiotic compounds with broad substrate specificity. It is responsible for decreased drug accumulation in multidrug-resistant cells and often mediates the development of resistance to anticancer drugs. This protein also functions as a transporter in the blood–brain barrier. Mutations in this gene are associated with colchicine resistance and Inflammatory bowel disease 13. Alternative splicing and the use of alternative promoters results in multiple transcript variants.

P-gp transports various substrates across the cell membrane including:

- Drugs such as colchicine, desloratadine, tacrolimus and quinidine.
- Chemotherapeutic agents such as topoisomerase inhibitors (i.e. etoposide, doxorubicin), microtubule-targeted drugs (i.e. vinblastine), and tyrosine kinase inhibitors (i.e. gefitinib, sunitinib).
- Lipids
- Steroids
- Xenobiotics
- Peptides
- Bilirubin
- Cardiac glycosides like digoxin
- Immunosuppressive agents
- Glucocorticoids like dexamethasone
- HIV-type 1 antiretroviral therapy agents like protease inhibitors and nonnucleoside reverse transcriptase inhibitors

Its ability to transport the above substrates accounts for the many roles of P-gp including:

- Regulating the distribution and bioavailability of drugs
  - Increased intestinal expression of P-glycoprotein can reduce the absorption of drugs that are substrates for P-glycoprotein. Thus, there is a reduced bioavailability, and therapeutic plasma concentrations are not attained. On the other hand, supratherapeutic plasma concentrations and drug toxicity may result because of decreased P-glycoprotein expression
  - Active cellular transport of antineoplastics resulting in multidrug resistance to these drugs
- The removal of toxic metabolites and xenobiotics from cells into urine, bile, and the intestinal lumen
- The transport of compounds out of the brain across the blood–brain barrier
- Digoxin uptake
- Prevention of ivermectin and loperamide entry into the central nervous system
- The migration of dendritic cells
- Protection of hematopoietic stem cells from toxins.

It is inhibited by many drugs, such as amiodarone, azithromycin, captopril, clarithromycin, cyclosporine, piperine, quercetin, quinidine, quinine, reserpine, ritonavir, tariquidar, and verapamil.

== Regulation of expression and function of P-gp in cancer cells ==
At the transcriptional level, the expression of P-gp has been intensively studied, and numerous transcription factors and pathways are known to play roles. A variety of transcription factors, such as p53, YB-1, and NF-κB are involved in the direct regulation of P-gp by binding to the promoter regions of the P-gp gene. Many cell signaling pathways are also involved in transcriptional regulation of P-gp. For example, the PI3K/Akt pathway and the Wnt/β-catenin pathway were reported to positively regulate the expression of P-gp. Mitogen-activated protein kinase (MAPK) signaling includes three pathways: the classical MAPK/ERK pathway, the p38 MAPK pathway, and the c-Jun N-terminal kinase (JNK) pathway, all of which were reported to have implications in the regulation of the expression of P-gp. Studies suggested that the MAPK/ERK pathway is involved in the positive regulation of P-gp; the p38 MAPK pathway negatively regulates the expression of the P-gp gene; and the JNK pathway was reported to be involved in both positive regulation and negative regulation of P-gp.

After 2008, microRNAs (miRNAs) were identified as new players in regulating the expression of P-gp in both transcriptional and post-transcriptional levels. Some miRNAs decrease the expression of P-gp. For example, miR-200c down-regulates the expression of P-gp through the JNK signaling pathway or ZEB1 and ZEB2; miR-145 down-regulates the mRNA of P-gp by directly binding to the 3'-UTR of the gene of P-gp and thus suppresses the translation of P-gp. Some other miRNAs increase the expression of P-gp. For example, miR-27a up-regulates P-gp expression by suppressing the Raf kinase inhibitor protein (RKIP); alternatively, miR-27a can also directly bind to the promoter of the P-gp gene, which works in a similar way with the mechanism of action of transcriptional factors.

The expression of P-gp is also regulated by post-translational events, such as post-transcriptional modification, degradation, and intracellular trafficking of P-gp. Pim-1 protects P-gp from ubiquitination and the following degradation in the proteasome. Small GTPase Rab5 down-regulates the endocytotic trafficking of P-gp and thus increases the functional P-gp level on the cell membrane; while small GTPase Rab4 works in an opposite way: Rab4 down-regulates the exocytotic trafficking of P-gp from intracellular compartments to the cell membrane, and therefore decreases the functional P-gp level on the cell membrane.

== Clinical significance ==
=== Drug interactions ===
Some common pharmacological inhibitors of P-glycoprotein include: amiodarone, clarithromycin, ciclosporin, colchicine, diltiazem, erythromycin, felodipine, ketoconazole, lansoprazole, omeprazole and other proton-pump inhibitors, nifedipine, paroxetine, reserpine, saquinavir, sertraline, quinidine, tamoxifen, verapamil, and duloxetine. The antischistosomal drug praziquantel is an inhibitor and likely substrate of schistosome P-glycoprotein. Elacridar and CP 100356 are other common P-gp inhibitors. Zosuquidar and tariquidar were also developed with this in mind. Lastly, valspodar and reversan are other examples of such agents. ABCB1 is linked to the daily dose of warfarin required to maintain the INR to a target of 2.5. Patients with the GT or TT genotypes of the 2677G>T SNP require around 20% more warfarin daily.

Common pharmacological inducers of P-glycoprotein include carbamazepine, dexamethasone, doxorubicin, nefazodone, phenobarbital, phenytoin, prazosin, rifampicin, St. John's wort, tenofovir, tipranavir, trazodone, and vinblastine.

Substrates of P-glycoprotein are susceptible to changes in pharmacokinetics due to drug interactions with P-gp inhibitors or inducers. Some of these substrates include colchicine, ciclosporin, dabigatran, digoxin, diltiazem, fexofenadine, indinavir, morphine, and sirolimus.

=== Diseases (non-cancer) ===
P-gp has been shown to transport the amyloid beta protein—which aggregates to form Aβ plaques in Alzheimer's disease—out of the brain. Because the expression of P-gp is decreased in Alzheimer's disease brains, increasing the function of the transporter has been proposed as a strategy for preventing and/or treating Alzheimer's disease.

Altered P-gp function has also been linked to inflammatory bowel diseases (IBD); however, due to its ambivalent effects in intestinal inflammation many questions remain so far unanswered. While decreased efflux activity may promote disease susceptibility and drug toxicity, increased efflux activity may confer resistance to therapeutic drugs in IBD. Mice deficient in MDR1A develop chronic intestinal inflammation spontaneously, which appears to resemble human ulcerative colitis.

=== Cancer ===
P-gp efflux activity is capable of lowering intracellular concentrations of otherwise beneficial compounds, such as chemotherapeutics and other medications, to sub-therapeutic levels. Consequently, P-gp overexpression is one of the main mechanisms behind decreased intracellular drug accumulation and development of multidrug resistance in human multidrug-resistant (MDR) cancers.

== History ==
P-gp was first characterized in 1976. P-gp was shown to be responsible for conferring multidrug resistance upon mutant cultured cancer cells that had developed resistance to cytotoxic drugs.

The structure of mouse P-gp, which has 87% sequence identity to human P-gp, was resolved by x-ray crystallography in 2009. The first structure of human P-gp was solved in 2018, with the protein in its ATP-bound, outward-facing conformation.

== Research ==
Radioactive verapamil can be used for measuring P-gp function with positron emission tomography.

P-gp is also used to differentiate transitional B cells from naive B cells. Dyes such as rhodamine 123 and MitoTracker dyes from Invitrogen can be used to make this differentiation.

=== P-gp as a drug target ===
It has been suggested that inhibitors of P-gp might treat various diseases, especially cancers, but none have done well in clinical trials.

== Single nucleotide polymorphism rs1045642 ==
Single Nucleotide Polymorphism rs1045642 (3435T>C or 3435C>T) is important for the differential activity of the P-gp pump.

Homozygous subjects, identified with the TT genotype, are usually more able to extrude xenobiotics from the cell. A Homozygous genotype for the allele ABCB1/MDR1 is capable of a higher absorption from the blood vessels and a lower extrusion into the lumen. Xenobiotics are extruded at a lower rate with heterozygous (CT) alleles compared to homozygous ones.
