= Poncirin =

- Poncirin

Names
- IUPAC name (2S)-5-Hydroxy-4′-methoxy-7-[α-L-rhamnopyranosyl-(1→2)-β-D-glucopyranosyloxy]flavan-4-one
- Systematic IUPAC name (2S)-7-{[(2S,3R,4S,5S,6R)-4,5-Dihydroxy-6-(hydroxymethyl)-3-{[(2S,3R,4R,5R,6S)-3,4,5-trihydroxy-6-methyloxan-2-yl]oxy}oxan-2-yl]oxy}-5-hydroxy-2-(4-methoxyphenyl)-2,3-dihydro-4H-1-benzopyran-4-one
- Other names Isosakuranetin-7-neohesperidoside

Identifiers
CAS Number	14941-08-3
3D model (JSmol)	Interactive image
ChEBI	CHEBI:66773
ChEMBL	ChEMBL451050
ChemSpider	390894
ECHA InfoCard	100.035.458
PubChem CID	442456
UNII	8MUY4P95B4
CompTox Dashboard (EPA)	DTXSID00933642
- InChI: InChI=1S/C28H34O14/c1-11-21(32)23(34)25(36)27(38-11)42-26-24(35)22(33)19(10-29)41-28(26)39-14-7-15(30)20-16(31)9-17(40-18(20)8-14)12-3-5-13(37-2)6-4-12/h3-8,11,17,19,21-30,32-36H,9-10H2,1-2H3/t11-,17-,19+,21-,22+,23+,24-,25+,26+,27-,28+/m0/s1 Key: NLAWPKPYBMEWIR-SKYQDXIQSA-N
- SMILES: C[C@H]1[C@@H]([C@H]([C@H]([C@@H](O1)O[C@@H]2[C@H]([C@@H]([C@H](O[C@H]2OC3=CC(=C4C(=O)C[C@H](OC4=C3)C5=CC=C(C=C5)OC)O)CO)O)O)O)O)O

Properties
Chemical formula	C_{28}H_{34}O_{14}
Molar mass	594.566 g·mol^{−1}
- Except where otherwise noted, data are given for materials in their standard state (at 25 °C [77 °F], 100 kPa). Infobox references

Poncirin is the 7-O-neohesperidoside of isosakuranetin. Poncirin can be extracted from trifoliate orange (Poncirus trifoliata), and varieties of grapefruit.
