= Raf kinase inhibitor protein =

The Raf kinase inhibitor protein (RKIP) is a kinase inhibitor protein, that regulates many signaling pathways within the cell. RKIP is a member of the phosphatidylethanolamine-binding protein family and has displayed disruptive regulation on the Raf-1-MEK1/2, ERK1/2 and NF-kappaB signalling pathways, by interaction with the Raf-1 kinase.

RKIP has also been shown to inhibit G protein coupled receptor kinases (GRK) when phosphorylated by protein kinase C. Via this mechanism it has been shown to exert beneficial effects on cardiac structure and function.
