= Tariquidar =

Chemical compound

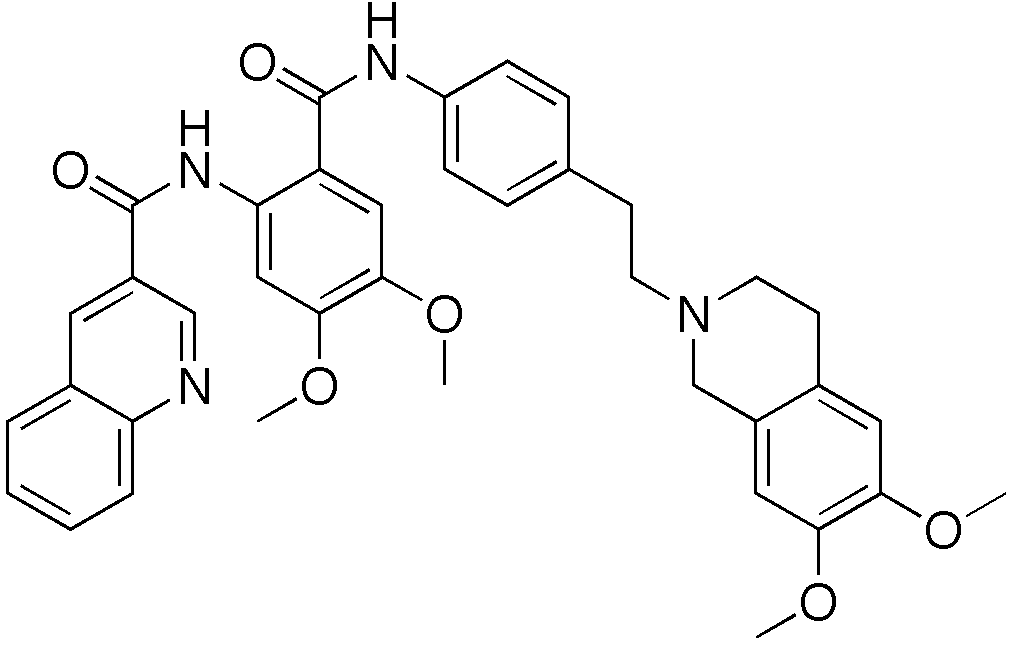

Clinical data
- ATC code: none

Identifiers
- IUPAC name: N-[2-[[4-[2-(6,7-Dimethoxy-3,4-dihydro-1H-isoquinolin-2-yl)ethyl]phenyl]carbamoyl]-4,5-dimethoxyphenyl]quinoline-3-carboxamide
- CAS Number: 206873-63-4
- PubChem CID: 148201
- ChemSpider: 130650
- UNII: J58862DTVD
- ChEMBL: ChEMBL348475
- CompTox Dashboard (EPA): DTXSID10174746

Chemical and physical data
- Formula: C_{38}H_{38}N_{4}O_{6}
- Molar mass: 646.744 g·mol^{−1}
- 3D model (JSmol): Interactive image
- SMILES: COC1=C(C=C2CN(CCC2=C1)CCC3=CC=C(C=C3)NC(=O)C4=CC(=C(C=C4NC(=O)C5=CC6=CC=CC=C6N=C5)OC)OC)OC
- InChI: InChI=1S/C38H38N4O6/c1-45-33-18-25-14-16-42(23-28(25)19-34(33)46-2)15-13-24-9-11-29(12-10-24)40-38(44)30-20-35(47-3)36(48-4)21-32(30)41-37(43)27-17-26-7-5-6-8-31(26)39-22-27/h5-12,17-22H,13-16,23H2,1-4H3,(H,40,44)(H,41,43); Key:LGGHDPFKSSRQNS-UHFFFAOYSA-N

Tariquidar (INN/USAN) is a potent P-glycoprotein inhibitor and a substrate of breast cancer protein (BCRP/ABCG2) undergoing research as an adjuvant against multi-drug resistance in cancer.

Tariquidar progressed to phase III clinical trials in combination with vinorelbine in an effort to enhance the efficacy of this chemotherapeutic agent. However, several of these trials were terminated early due to adverse effects, and further development of Tariquidar was subsequently halted.
