= Chemosensitizer =

Class of pharmaceutical compounds

A chemosensitizer is a drug that makes tumor cells more sensitive to the effects of chemotherapy, countering the effect of chemoresistance.

Chemosensitizers are being studied for the treatment of multidrug resistant cancer.
