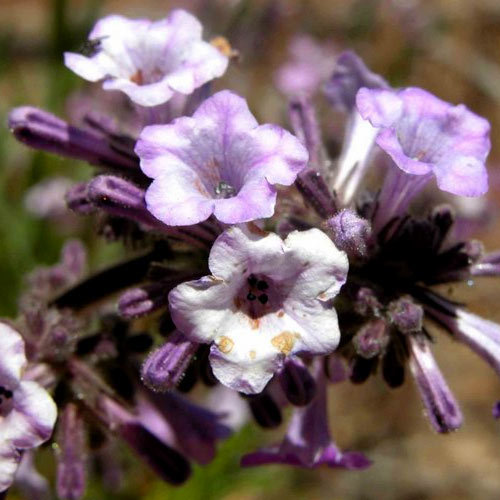

Scientific classification
- Kingdom: Plantae
- Clade: Tracheophytes
- Clade: Angiosperms
- Clade: Eudicots
- Clade: Asterids
- Order: Boraginales
- Family: Namaceae
- Genus: Eriodictyon
- Species: E. parryi

Binomial name
- Eriodictyon parryi (A.Gray) Greene

Synonyms
- Nama parryi A.Gray; Turricula parryi (A.Gray) J.F.Macbr.

= Eriodictyon parryi =

Poodle-dog bush

Species of plant

Eriodictyon parryi or poodle-dog bush is a tall California mountain shrub with showy purple flowers, which is notable for secreting a severe skin irritant. It is an opportunistic species that grows mostly in areas that have been disturbed by fire. In a dry early spring in Southern California, its semi-dormant leaves can droop and curl into coils like locks of curly hair, hence the popular name based on the metaphor of a poodle's natural hair.

== Description ==
It grows into a moderate size, perennial woody shrub, branching from the base but with main stems extending for up to 2 meters. Is leaves are long and narrow, and may be toothed at the edge; they can be from 4 to 30 centimetres (1.6 to 11.8 in) long. It flowers from June to August, having clusters (cymes) of attractive bell-shaped blue, lavender or purple flowers. The plant has a sickly-sweet, minty, or rank smell, even when not in flower.

=== Identification ===
The plant's flower clusters and hairy stem are similar to those of many plants in the genus Phacelia, but it can be distinguished from them by its greater height.

It can be more difficult to distinguish from other members of its own genus, such as yerba santa (E. californicum, E. crassifolium, and E. trichocalyx). The smells of the plants are similar. The yerba santa species are not skin irritants and not as specialized for growth in disturbed habitats such as burn areas. Of these plants, E. parryi, E. trichocalyx, and E. crassifolium grow mostly south of the latitude of the Monterey/San Luis Obispo county line, while E. californicum grows almost entirely north of that latitude. Therefore in many cases, E. parryi can be distinguished from yerba santa based on where it grows: in the southern part of the state, in recently disturbed areas. However, yerba santa may grow near or alongside E. parryi in disturbed areas.

The following factors can be used to distinguish yerba santa from E. parryi. Flowers of E. parryi are thumb-sized, while those of yerba santa are pinkie-sized or smaller. E. parryi has several stems which radiate from a common taproot and then grow straight up, each such stem being surrounded by thick leaves so as to form a symmetrical cone. E. trichocalyx has thin, woody, branching stems and tough, leathery, dark green leaves. E. parryi is a fast-growing opportunist, and when mixed in with E. trichocalyx may be obviously fresher and younger. Yerba santa may grow by crown sprouting in burn areas, while E. parryi grows in these areas from seed. E. trichocalyx, being a slower-growing perennial, often has leaves that show damage from previous years. Although both plants can grow to be as tall as a person, E. trichocalyx tends to a much smaller stature at the higher elevations; rare, large plants at these elevations tend to be old and woody, and may have a large, tree-like trunk at their base and a great deal of dead wood and twigs.

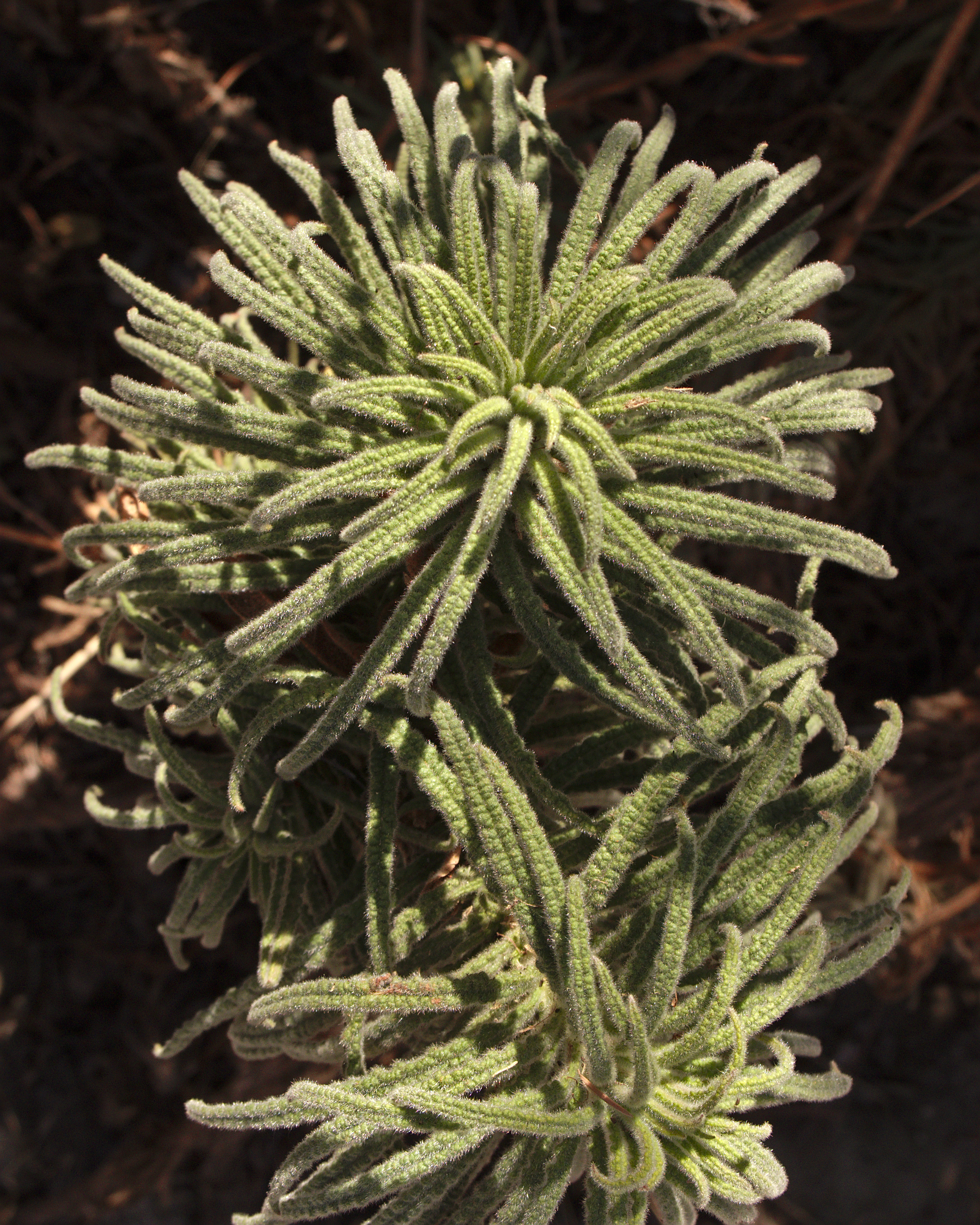
The bush after the loss of its flowers

Bush on Mt. Wilson, CA, showing the plant's typical habit. Stalks radiate outward at the base and then grow upward without further branching. Each thick, vertical stem is surrounded by a dense cone of leaves.

Growing among burned trees, i.e., in its typical habitat, which is a recently disturbed area.

== Taxonomy ==
When first described by Asa Gray, the poodle-dog bush was placed within the genus Nama. It was subsequently moved to a monotypic genus Turricula (having the same name as a genus of sea snails). Molecular phylogenetic analysis carried out by Ferguson (1998) supports treating Turricula as a separate genus within a clade (Ferguson does not use the term "subfamily") that includes Eriodictyon, and also the genera Nama and Wigandia. However, other molecular data support placing the plant in Eriodictyon.

== Distribution and habitat ==
The plant is endemic to southern California and Baja California. In Baja California it rarely appears in the southern Sierra de Juarez and the western Sierra de San Pedro Martir as a fire-following shrub. It is particularly common in the Transverse Ranges, and also occurs in the Coast Ranges south of San Luis Obispo, and in the Sierra Nevada as far north as Kings Canyon.

It is found in chaparral, on granitic slopes and ridges from 1,000 to 2,300 metres (3,300 to 7,500 ft). It thrives in areas of yellow pine forest that have been recently disturbed by fire or landslides, where it helps to prevent erosion and can cover burned hillsides with attractive color. The plant often remains dominant in such areas for about ten years until saplings and other plants fill back in and outcompete it. Its seeds can then remain dormant in soil for long periods, with the plant springing back up quickly at the next disturbance.

Presumably because of its irritant properties, poodle-dog bush is rarely grown in gardens despite its attractive flowers, and it is difficult to grow in garden conditions.

== Skin irritant ==
Like many species in the forget-me-not family, poodle-dog bush causes severe irritation if touched, akin to poison oak. It can raise blisters lasting as long as several weeks. There may be a delay of several days before the reaction starts. The hairs stick to skin and clothing. The allergic contact dermatitis is due to prenylated phenolics exuded by hairs (glandular trichomes) of the plant. The principal irritants are derivatives of farnesyl hydroquinone and 3-farnesyl-P-hydroxybenzoic acid. Once the immune system has been sensitized to the irritant, later exposure can cause a memory response, in which previously exposed areas erupt even though they were not exposed the second time.

Exposure can be prevented by learning to identify and avoid the plant, and by wearing gloves, long sleeves, and long pants. There is no definitive evidence on methods for cleansing contaminated skin of the hairs or the irritant they carry. It is not known whether washing with soap and water is effective, and there is some reason to believe that organic solvents such as acetone would be effective (curiously, alcohol is not mentioned). If clothes are contaminated, they should not be washed along with uncontaminated clothing. It is possible that the irritant can be removed from clothing by soaking overnight in a solution of sodium carbonate, a.k.a. washing soda, which is the major component of some dishwasher powders, and which can be prepared by heating baking soda (sodium hydrogen carbonate) at temperatures between 80 °C (176 °F) and 200 °C (392 °F).

Topical anaesthetics should be chosen carefully because some types such as benzocaine may worsen the reaction; better drugs are lidocaine and pramoxine (brand names Sarna Sensitive and Itch-X). Oral or topical corticosteroids may be effective. Antihistamines are not effective, because the symptoms are not mediated by histamines.

Native Americans used the plant medicinally: Zigmond (1981, p. 68) reports that the Kawaiisu people used an infusion of the leaves to relieve swellings or rheumatism, and Sparkman (1908, p. 230) also reports that the Luiseño people (who knew it as Atovikut) used it medicinally, though he does not specify for what purpose. No clinical trials have been undertaken to support the efficacy of the plant for these clinical conditions, and there is no reliable evidence that it can be used for any type of treatment.

== Scientific papers ==
- Czaplicki, CD (2013). "Contact dermatitis from Eriodictyon parryi: a novel cause of contact dermatitis in California". Wilderness Environ Med. 24: 253–6. doi:10.1016/j.wem.2013.01.003. PMID 23473793.
- Zigmond, M. L. (1981) Kawaiisu ethnobotany. Salt Lake City: University of Utah Press.
- Ferguson, D. M. (1998). "Phylogenetic analysis and relationships in Hydrophyllaceae based on ndhF sequence data". Systematic Botany. 23: 253–268. JSTOR 2419504.
- Sparkman, P. S. (1908). "The culture of the Luiseno Indians". University of California Publications in American Archaeology and Ethnology. 8 (4): 187–234.
