= Nama undulata =

Conservation status
- Secure (NatureServe)

Scientific classification
- Kingdom: Plantae
- Clade: Tracheophytes
- Clade: Angiosperms
- Clade: Eudicots
- Clade: Asterids
- Order: Boraginales
- Family: Namaceae
- Genus: Nama
- Species: N. undulata

Binomial name
- Nama undulata Kunth

Synonyms
- Marilaunidium undulatum (Kunth) Kuntze

Species of plant

Nama undulata is a species of flowering plant in the family Namaceae, native to Mexico and northern Argentina. It was first described by Carl Sigismund Kunth in 1819. Asa Gray later used the same combination for a different species, so Nama undulata A.Gray is an illegitimate name, now regarded as a synonym of Nama stenocarpa.
