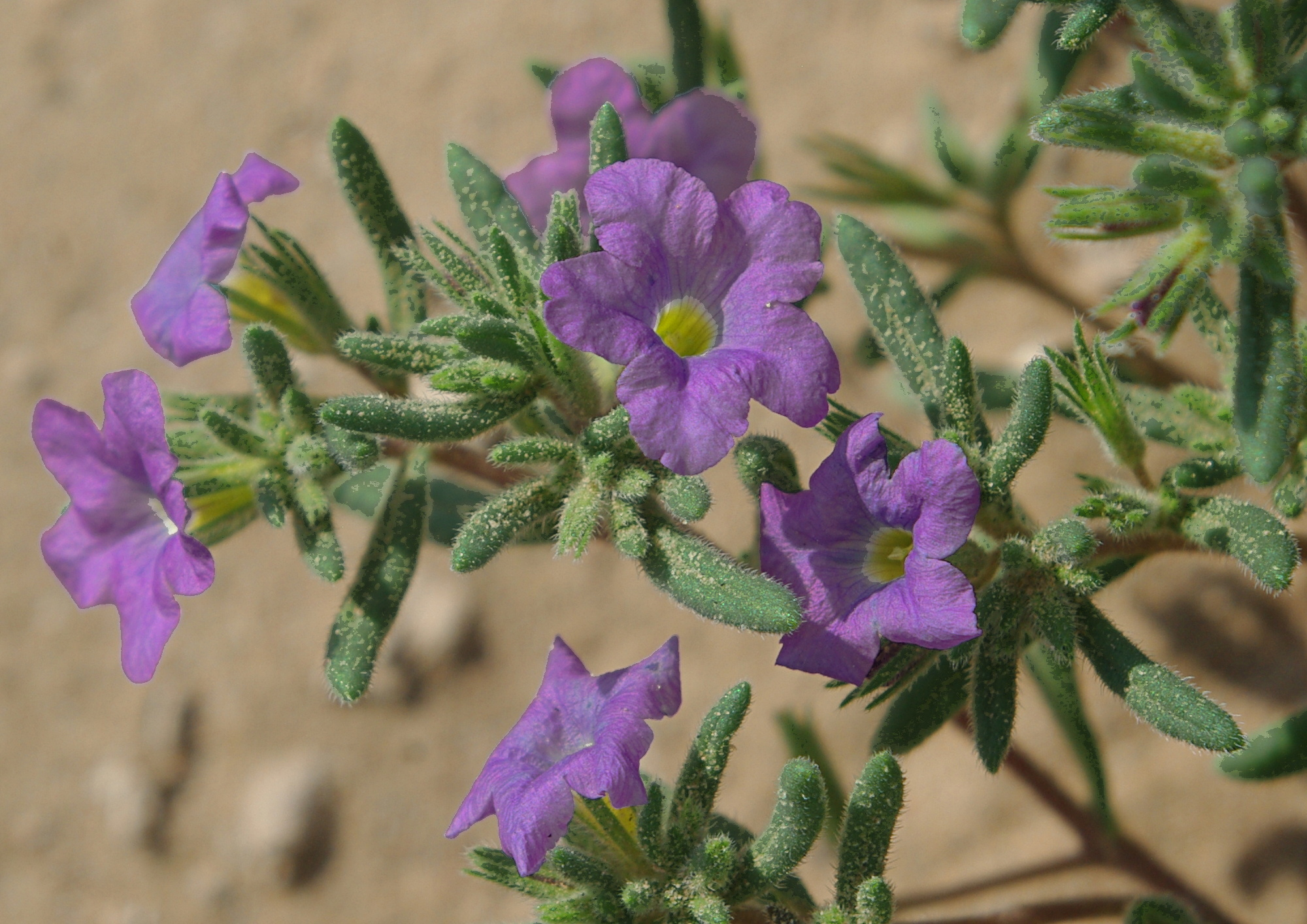

Conservation status
- Apparently Secure (NatureServe)

Scientific classification
- Kingdom: Plantae
- Clade: Tracheophytes
- Clade: Angiosperms
- Clade: Eudicots
- Clade: Asterids
- Order: Boraginales
- Family: Namaceae
- Genus: Nama
- Species: N. hispida

Binomial name
- Nama hispida Gray

Synonyms
- Nama hispidum Gray (1862)

= Nama hispida =

Species of flowering plant

Nama hispida is an annual flowering plant in the family Namaceae. Common names include sand bells, rough nama, and bristly nama. It is native to the American desert southwest and throughout northern and central Mexico.

== Description ==
Nama hispida is an annual herb growing 5–30 centimetres (2.0–11.8 in) tall. The stems are erect to ascending and may further spread with age. The leaves are alternate, slightly broader at the tip and can be 1–7 centimetres (0.39–2.76 in) long. The leaf bases narrow into a winged petiole, but the upper leaves are smaller and sessile. All the foliage is pubescent.

The flowers are bright purple, lavender, or pink, and arranged in small clusters at branch tips or they are solitary in leaf axils. The calyces have 5 lobes and are divided nearly to the base. The corolla has a funnel to bell shape, 5 lobes, and is roughly 8-15 millimeters long and nearly as wide at the top. The fruit is a capsule with many tiny seeds.

== Distribution ==
Nama hispida occurs in the southwestern United States and northern and central Mexico, largely throughout the Chihuahuan Desert. Its range extends from California east to Oklahoma and Texas. The distribution continues south into Baja and mainland Mexico, until the state of Veracruz.

== Ecology ==
Nama hispida is frequently, though not exclusively found on gypsum soils.

Halictid bees of the genera Sphecodosoma and Conanthalictus have been reported as frequent pollinators of N. hispida.

== Uses ==
Nama hispida has been used by the Navajo to treat spider bites.

== Similar species ==
- Nama demissa purple mat
