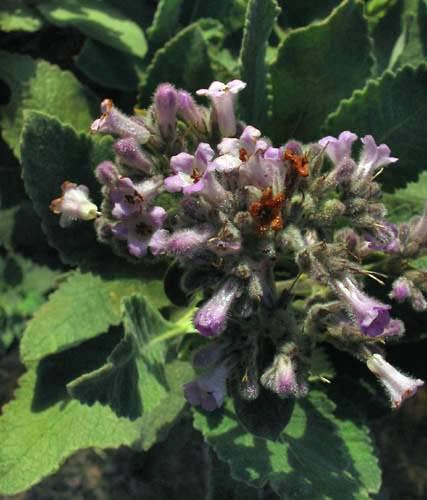

Scientific classification
- Kingdom: Plantae
- Clade: Embryophytes
- Clade: Tracheophytes
- Clade: Angiosperms
- Clade: Eudicots
- Clade: Asterids
- Order: Boraginales
- Family: Namaceae
- Genus: Eriodictyon
- Species: E. crassifolium

Binomial name
- Eriodictyon crassifolium Benth.

= Eriodictyon crassifolium =

Species of flowering plant

Eriodictyon crassifolium, or thickleaf yerba santa, is a shrub in the family Namaceae. "Crassifolium" means "thick leaf". The plant has thick, woolly leaves. It is native to California and Baja California.

== Description ==
Eriodictyon crassifolium is a hairy to woolly shrub growing one to three meters tall. The leaves are up to 17 centimeters long by 6 wide, dark green, and sometimes toothed along the edges. The underside of the leaf is hairy, while the top may be less hairy and more hard and leathery. The inflorescence is a cluster of bell-shaped lavender flowers. The stems are woody and branching.

The plant can be easily confused with E. trichocalyx and E. californicum (two other species of yerba santa) or, more consequentially, with the toxic E. parryi (poodle-dog bush). E. parryi grows in the same environments, but normally in disturbed landscapes such as burn areas. E. parryi is an extremely potent skin irritant. Information about distinguishing the species is given in the article on E. parryi.

== Distribution and habitat ==
It is native to California and Baja California, where it grows in several types of habitat, including chaparral, in the coastal and inland hills and mountains, mainly in the Southern California part of the state, south of the latitude of the Santa Barbara/San Luis Obispo county line and extending from the coast inland through the Coast Ranges and Transverse Ranges. In Baja California, it is found in the vicinity of La Misión, in the northern part of the state.

It grows mostly on dry slopes and in washes. It is commonly found along roadsides, and may also grow on mesas or in river bottoms. It can grow by crown sprouting in disturbed areas.

In the Transverse Ranges, it grows at elevations of up to 2500 m (8000 ft), although it is more common below 1800 m (6000 ft). Plants growing at the lower elevations may be up to 2 m tall and thickly vegetated.

== Uses ==
It was traditionally used by the Chumash people to keep airways open for proper breathing. The leaves can be chewed like gum or made into a bitter tea, although some people consider their odor unpleasant.

When gathering the leaves for human consumption, it is important to accurately distinguish the plant from the toxic E. parryi.
