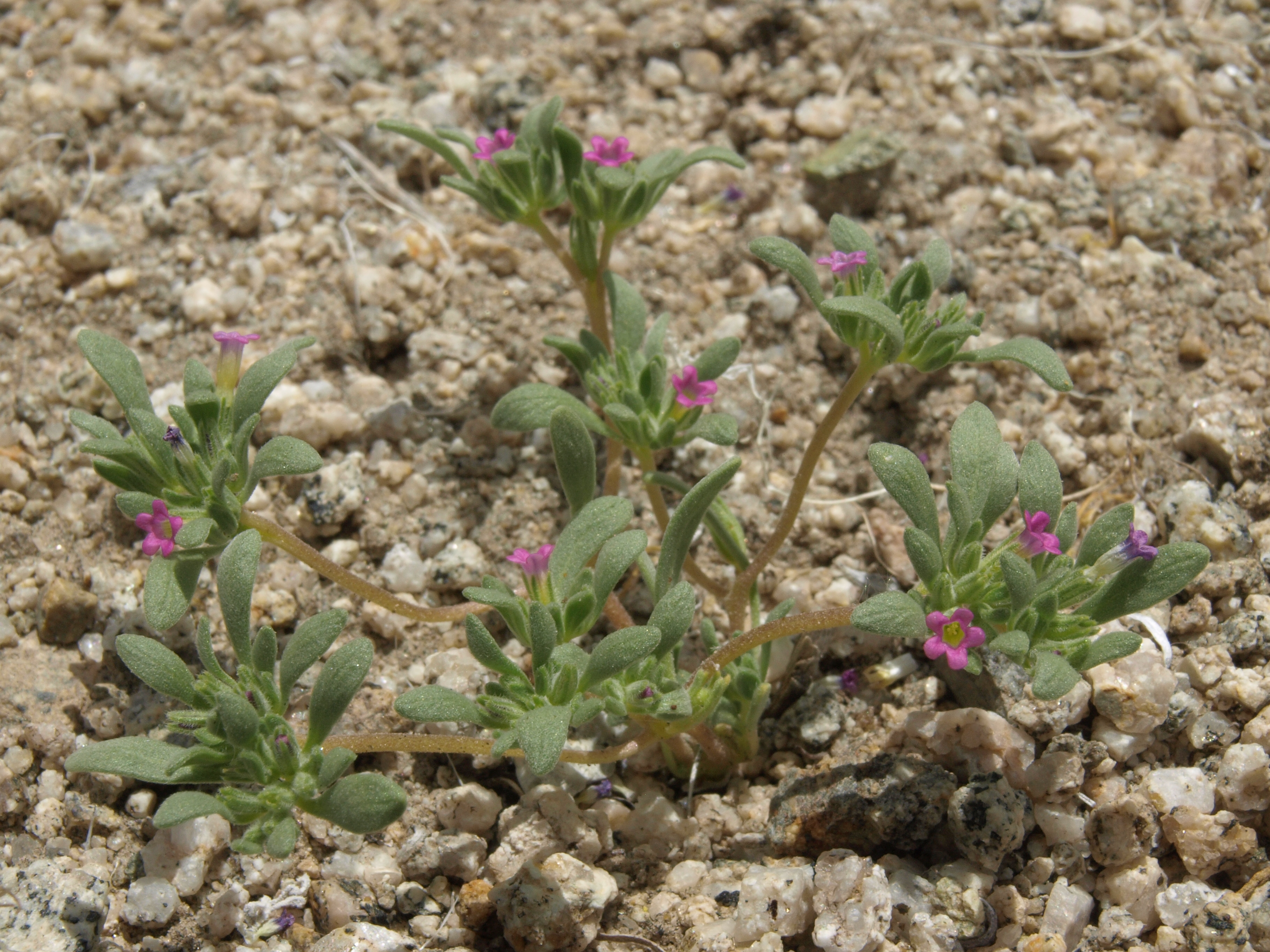
- In the White Mountains, California

Conservation status
- Apparently Secure (NatureServe)

Scientific classification
- Kingdom: Plantae
- Clade: Tracheophytes
- Clade: Angiosperms
- Clade: Eudicots
- Clade: Asterids
- Order: Boraginales
- Family: Namaceae
- Genus: Nama
- Species: N. depressa

Binomial name
- Nama depressa Lemmon ex A.Gray

= Nama depressa =

Species of flowering plant

Nama depressa (also spelt Nama depressum), commonly known as depressed fiddleleaf, is a species of flowering plant in the family Namaceae. It is native to Nevada and eastern California, where it grows in dry desert and mountain habitat, including the Mojave Desert.

== Description ==
Nama depressa is a hairy annual plant forming a small patch of prostrate stems up to 10 centimetres (3.9 in) long. The widely lance-shaped or spoon-shaped leaves are under 2 centimetres (0.79 in) in length, and occur mostly at the distal half of the stem, leaving the stem bases bare. The tiny flower is white or pink, funnel-shaped, and just a few millimeters wide.
