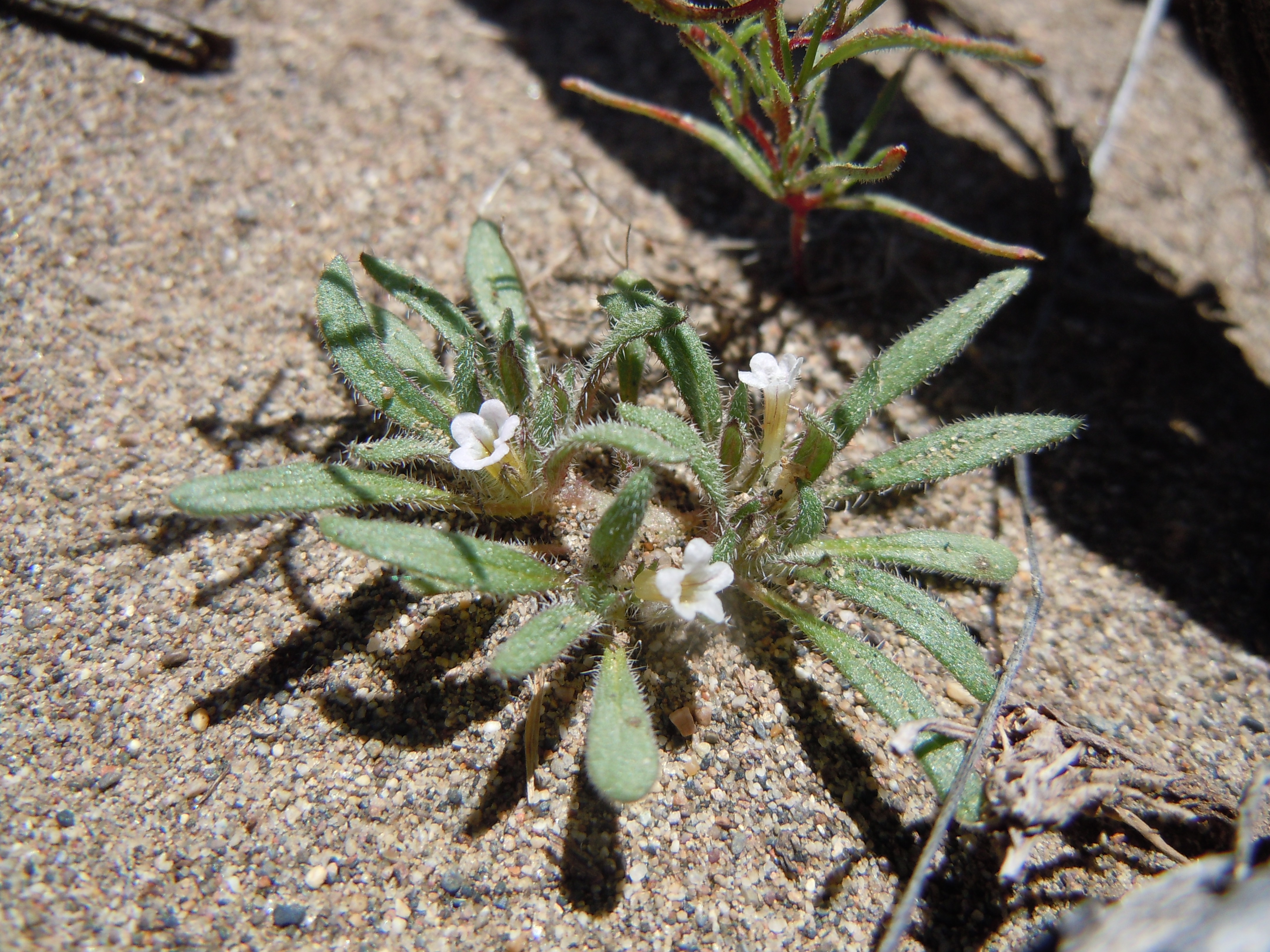

Conservation status
- Secure (NatureServe)

Scientific classification
- Kingdom: Plantae
- Clade: Tracheophytes
- Clade: Angiosperms
- Clade: Eudicots
- Clade: Asterids
- Order: Boraginales
- Family: Namaceae
- Genus: Nama
- Species: N. densa

Binomial name
- Nama densa Lemmon

= Nama densa =

Species of flowering plant

Nama densa (also spelt Nama densum) is a species of flowering plant in the family Namaceae known by the common name leafy fiddleleaf, matted nama or leafy nama. It is an annual plant and ranges from the Pacific Northwest to California to Colorado.

== Description ==
It is a very hairy annual plant forming a small patch of prostrate stems up to 4 in (10 cm) long. It has sessile leaves which are lanceolate to oblanceolate in shape. The inflorescence is a tiny solitary flower blooming from a leaf axil. Each flower is white to purple-tinged, funnel-shaped, and just a few millimeters long.

== Distribution and habitat ==
It is native to the western United States from the Pacific Northwest to California to Colorado, where it grows in many types of mostly sandy or gravelly habitat.

== Conservation ==
NatureServe lists Nama densa as Secure (G5) worldwide and it was last reviewed by NatureServe on 15 May 1998.
