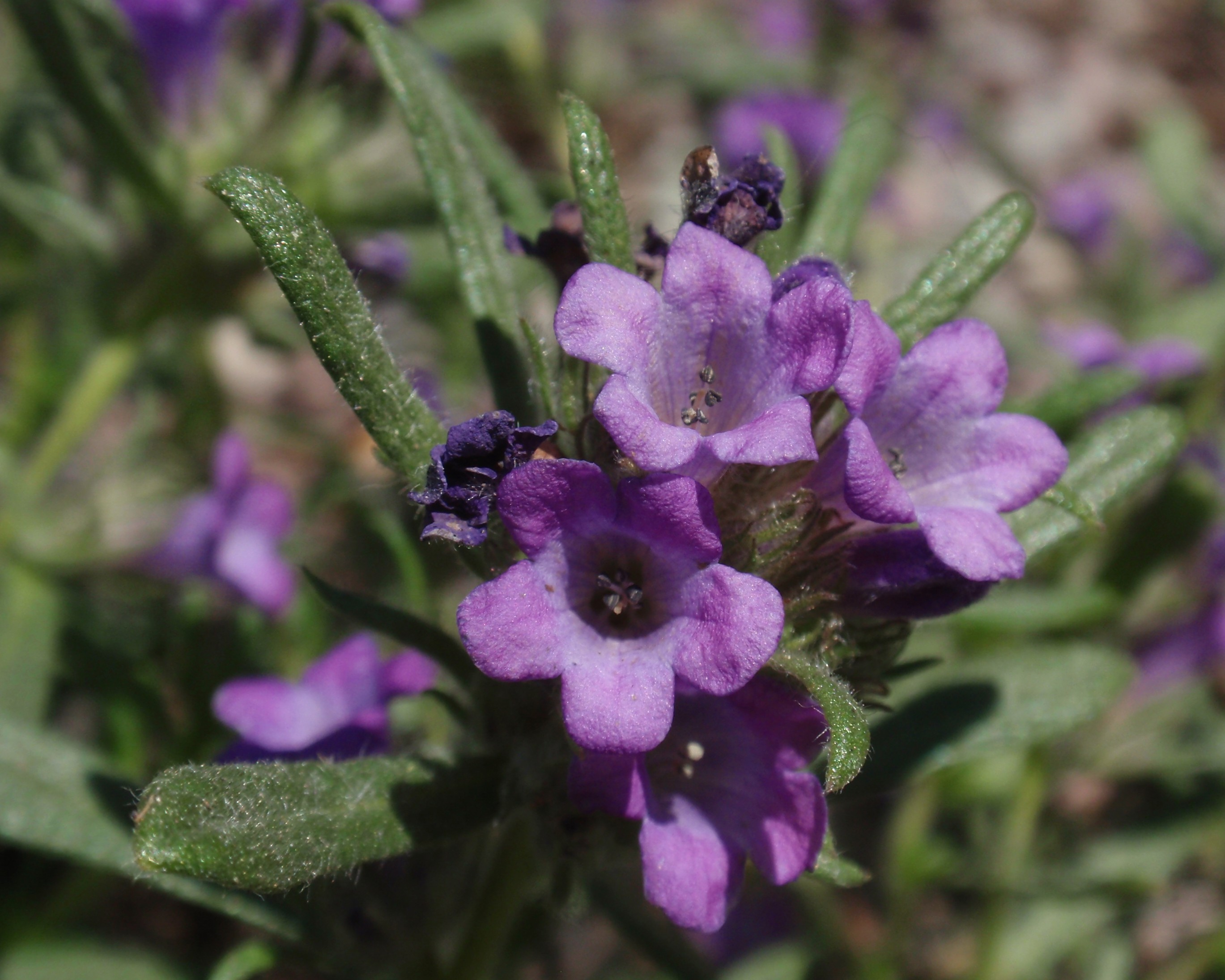

Conservation status
- Apparently Secure (NatureServe)

Scientific classification
- Kingdom: Plantae
- Clade: Tracheophytes
- Clade: Angiosperms
- Clade: Eudicots
- Clade: Asterids
- Order: Boraginales
- Family: Namaceae
- Genus: Nama
- Species: N. lobbii

Binomial name
- Nama lobbii A.Gray

Synonyms
- Eriodictyon lobbii Greene

= Nama lobbii =

Species of flowering plant

Nama lobbii, synonym Eriodictyon lobbii, is a species of flowering plant in the family Namaceae, known by the common names Lobb's fiddleleaf and matted yerba santa. It is native to the Sierra Nevada and southern Cascade Range chain in California and adjacent sections of Nevada and Oregon. It grows in high mountain habitat in dry areas on slopes and ridges.

== Description ==
Nama lobbii is a rhizomatous perennial herb forming dense mats of glandular hairy to woolly herbage usually spreading more than a metre wide. The sticky, hairy oval leaves are up to six centimetres (2.4 in) long, occurring alternately along the branching stems and in clusters at stem forks. The funnel-shaped flowers are just under a centimetre wide with five rounded lobes. They are deep pink to purple in color. The plant sends out wide root networks which can grow up to five metres (16 ft) in length per year and sprout new plants.

== Taxonomy ==
This taxon has been variously treated as Nama lobbii, Conanthus lobbii, and Marilaunidium lobbii. The current treatment of Jepson eFlora regards this plant as Eriodictyon lobbii, based on molecular data provided on the Hydrophylloideae. As of December 2025, World Flora Online places the genus Nama in the family Namaceae.

== Uses ==
The plant Nama lobbii has been recommended for use as groundcover in revegetation projects in its native mountain ranges.
