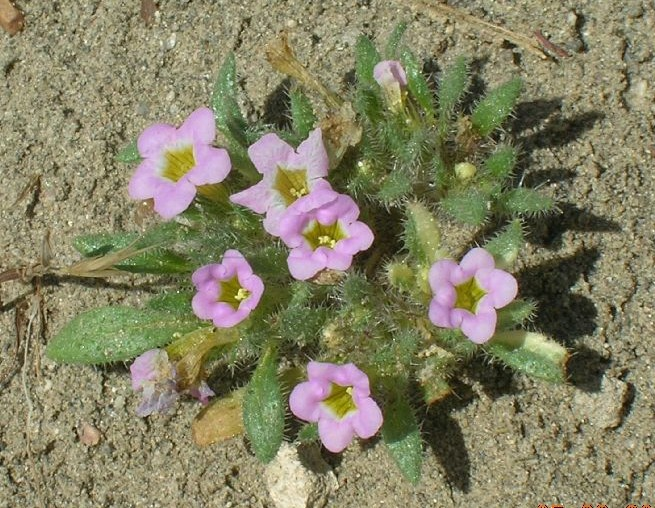

Conservation status
- Apparently Secure (NatureServe)

Scientific classification
- Kingdom: Plantae
- Clade: Tracheophytes
- Clade: Angiosperms
- Clade: Eudicots
- Clade: Asterids
- Order: Boraginales
- Family: Namaceae
- Genus: Nama
- Species: N. aretioides

Binomial name
- Nama aretioides (Hook. & Arn.) Brand

= Nama aretioides =

Species of flowering plant

Nama aretioides is a species of flowering plant in the family Namaceae known by the common name ground nama. It is native to the western United States, including much of the Great Basin and Pacific Northwest, where it grows in many types of dry and sandy habitat types, including sagebrush.

It is a densely hairy annual plant forming a small patch on the ground with prostrate stems no more than 12 centimeters long. The small leaves are sickle-shaped and coated in coarse hairs. The inflorescence is a cluster of many flowers in shades of white to very light to dark pink, to purplish. Each flower is tubular, opening into a flat face with five partially fused, rounded lobes. The fruit is a capsule a few millimeters in length.
