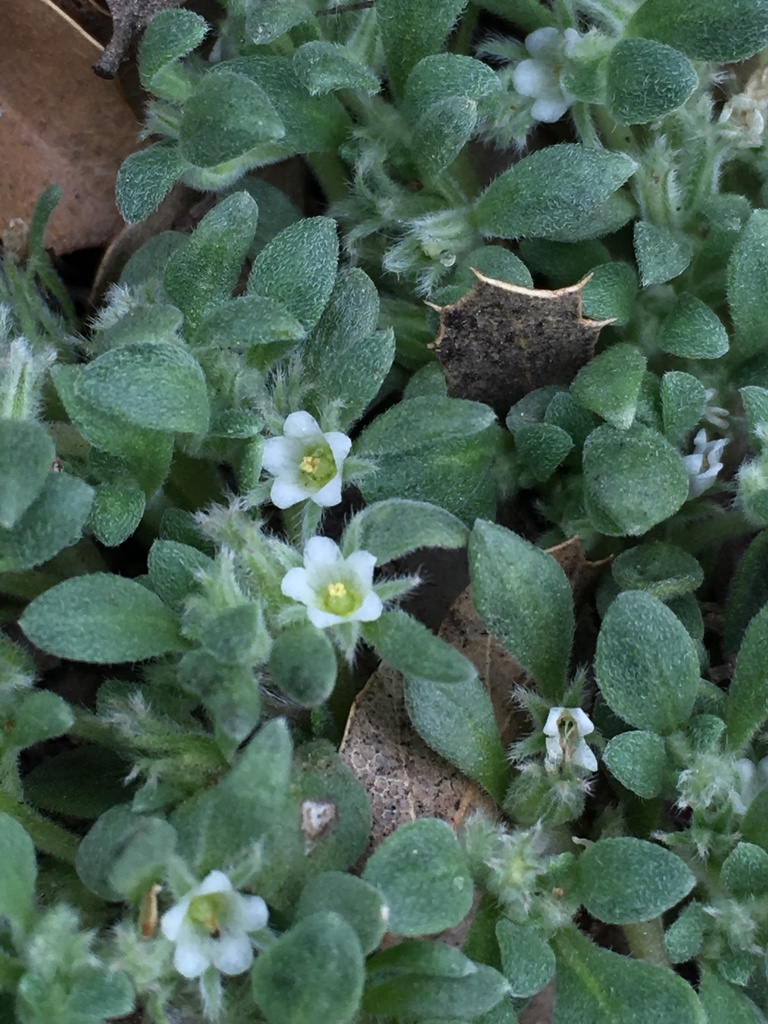
- Nama californica in flower

Conservation status
- Apparently Secure (NatureServe)

Scientific classification
- Kingdom: Plantae
- Clade: Tracheophytes
- Clade: Angiosperms
- Clade: Eudicots
- Clade: Asterids
- Order: Boraginales
- Family: Namaceae
- Genus: Nama
- Species: N. californica

Binomial name
- Nama californica (A.Gray) J.D.Bacon

Synonyms
- Lemmonia californica

= Nama californica =

Species of flowering plant

Nama californica is a species of flowering plant in the family Namaceae known by the common name California fiddleleaf. It is native to much of California and parts of western Nevada, where it grows in several types of dry and sandy habitat in desert, mountain, and valley areas.

== Description ==
It is a densely hairy annual plant forming a small patch on the ground with prostrate stems no more than 10 centimeters long. The small leaves are oval, widely lance-shaped, or spoon-shaped and coated in coarse or fine hairs. The inflorescence is a cluster of many tiny tubular flowers in shades of pale pink or white. Each five-lobed flower is about 2 millimeters wide.
