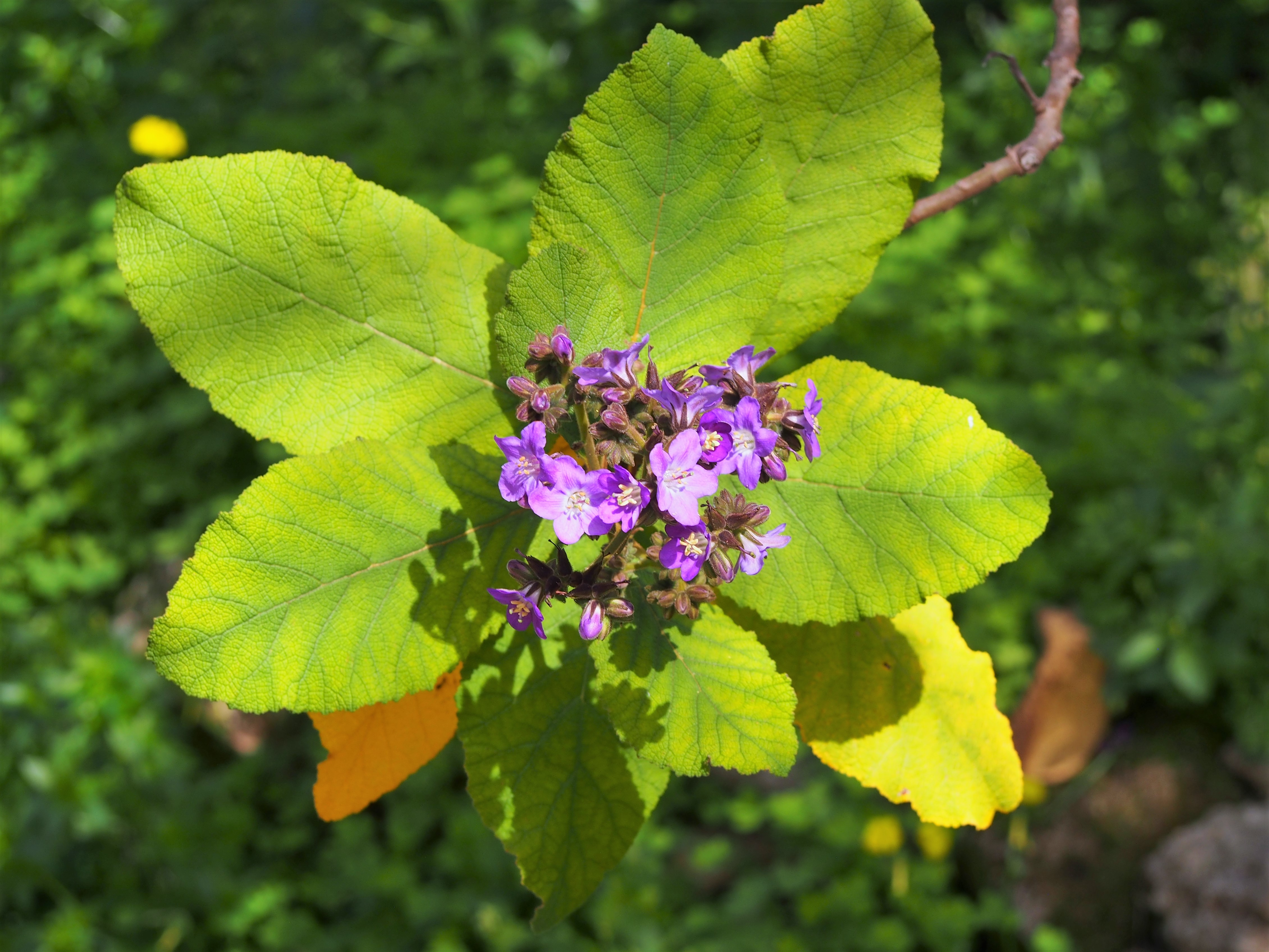

Conservation status
- Least Concern (IUCN 3.1)

Scientific classification
- Kingdom: Plantae
- Clade: Tracheophytes
- Clade: Angiosperms
- Clade: Eudicots
- Clade: Asterids
- Order: Boraginales
- Family: Namaceae
- Genus: Wigandia
- Species: W. urens

Binomial name
- Wigandia urens (Ruiz & Pav.) Kunth

Synonyms
- List: Cohiba urens Raf.; Ernstamra caracasana (Kunth) Kuntze; Ernstamra macrophylla Kuntze; Ernstamra scorpioides (Choisy) Kuntze; Ernstamra urens (Ruiz & Pav.) Kuntze; Hydrolea auriculata Moc. ex Choisy, pro syn.; Hydrolea caracassana Steud.; Hydrolea mollis Willd. ex Spreng.; Hydrolea scorpioides Moc. ex Choisy, pro syn.; Hydrolea urens Ruiz & Pav.; Nicotiana urens L.; Wigandia caracasana Kunth; Wigandia caracasana var. calycina Brand; Wigandia caracasana var. eucaracasana Brand, not validly publ.; Wigandia caracasana var. macrophylla (Schltdl. & Cham.) Brand; Wigandia caracasana var. viscosa (Donn.Sm.) J.F.Macbr.; Wigandia darii Ram.Goyena; Wigandia imperialis Bonard; Wigandia kunthii Choisy, nom. illeg. superfl.; Wigandia kunthii var. eukunthii Brand, not validly publ.; Wigandia kunthii var. intermedia Brand; Wigandia kunthii var. macrophylla (Schltdl. & Cham.) Choisy; Wigandia kunthii var. viscosa Brand; Wigandia macrophylla Schltdl. & Cham.; Wigandia peruviana W.T.Mill.; Wigandia scorpioides Choisy; Wigandia urens (L.) Urb., nom. illeg. homonym. post.; Wigandia urens var. caracasana (Kunth) D.N.Gibson; Wigandia vigieri Carrière; Wigandia vigieri Hérincq

= Wigandia urens =

Species of plant

Wigandia urens, synonyms including Wigandia caracasana, known as fiberglass plant and the Caracus wigandia, is a plant in the family Namaceae.

== Description ==
It is an erect shrubby plant up to 6 metres (20 ft) tall that can develop trichomes and urticating hairs with petioles 2.5 to 10 cm (0.98 to 3.94 in) long and oval leaves 5.5 to 50 cm (2.2 to 19.7 in) long and 3.5 to 37 cm (1.4 to 14.6 in) wide. The flowers develop calyx lobes 4 to 15 mm (0.16 to 0.59 in) long, with broadly campanulate corollas whose colors can differ between purple, blue or whitish lilac 1.5 to 2.2 cm (0.59 to 0.87 in) long. It has stamens attached to the corollas for a quarter of their length and hairy filaments 1.2 to 1.5 cm (0.47 to 0.59 in) long in the lower 3 quarters. It has slightly oblong anthers 3 to 6 mm.

There are a variety of associated herbivorous insects, including milpa grasshopper, conspicuous cricket, tree crickets, green peach aphid, Chichicastlera moth, and white-spotted owl moth, among others.

== Distribution and habitat ==
Wigandia urens is native from Mexico south through Central America and northern South America to Trinidad and Peru. In particular it is found in Colombia, Costa Rica, El Salvador, Guatemala, Honduras, much of Mexico, Nicaragua, Panamá, Peru, Trinidad-Tobago, and Venezuela. In Mexico, it is distributed in Sinaloa, Durango, Nayarit, Zacatecas, Jalisco, Colima, Aguascalientes, Guanajuato, San Luis Potosí, Michoacán, Querétaro, Hidalgo, State of Mexico, Mexico City, Tlaxcala, Morelos, Guerrero, Puebla, Veracruz, Oaxaca, and Chiapas. In its native habitat, it can be found in pine-oak forests, cloud forests, low deciduous forest and xerophilous scrubland at altitudes from 20 to 3,000 m (70 to 9,840 ft) above sea level.

It has become naturalized in California, the Canary Islands, France, Italy, Madeira, and Spain. Specimens have been found in Australia and Africa, and it is also considered an invasive species in the western Himalayas like Uttarakhand state in India.

== Uses ==
It is often used for ornamental purposes, as well as ceremonial and religious purposes. It is also used as a folk remedy to treat syphilis, rheumatism, and insomnia.

It is commonly grown in gardens, often under the synonym Wigandia caracasana. It thrives best in a mixture of loam and peat. Cuttings in sand will strike if placed under glass and in heat.

== Dermatitis ==
It can cause severe contact dermatitis. A substance that it secretes, 2,3-dimethoxy-geranyl- 1,4-benzoquinone (consisting of a quinonoid ring with a 10 or 11 carbon-membered side chain), is a remarkably strong sensitizer, which is found nowhere else in the plant kingdom. It has been described as approximating an "ideal allergen".

== Gallery ==
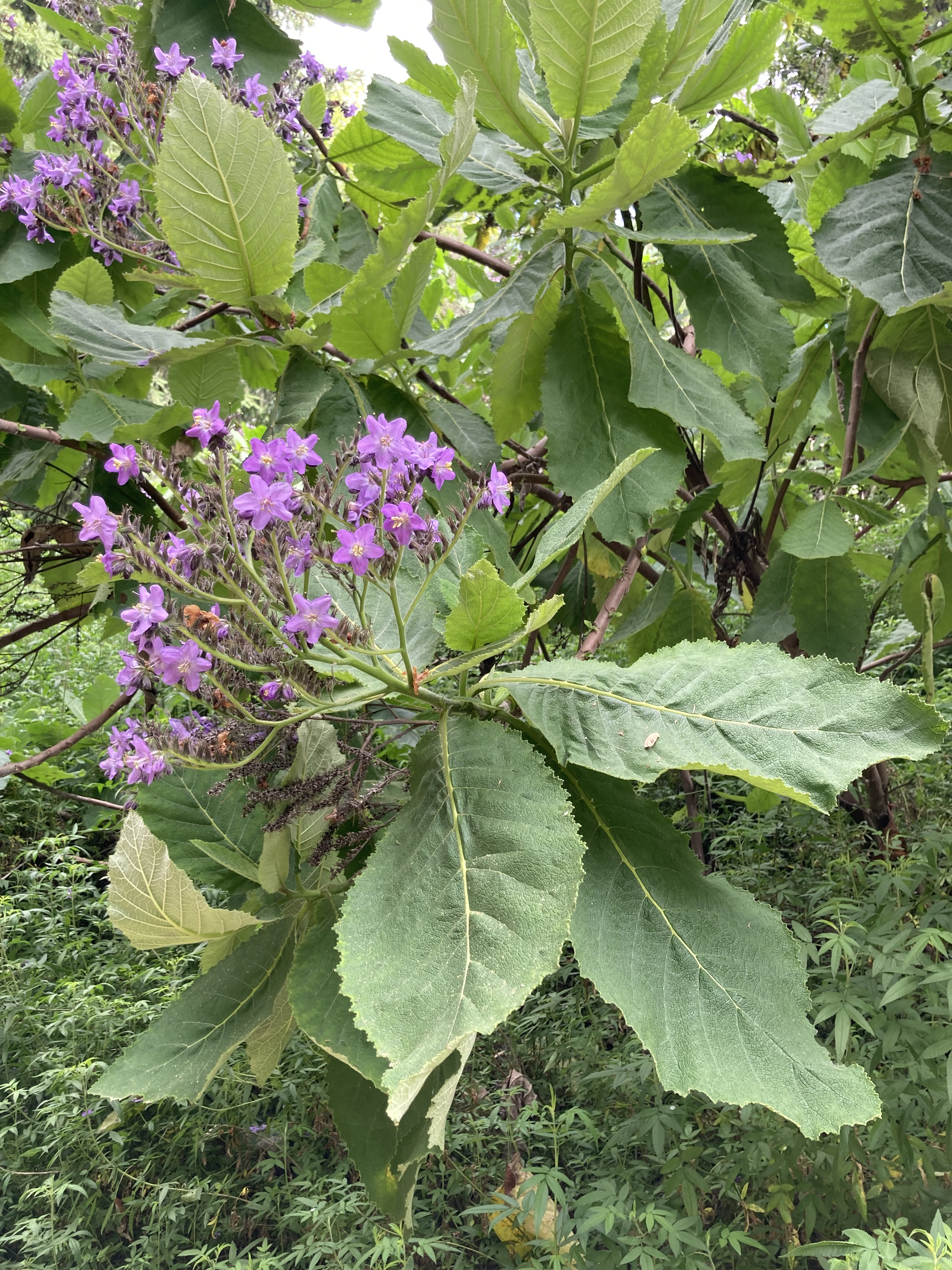
Leaves and flowers

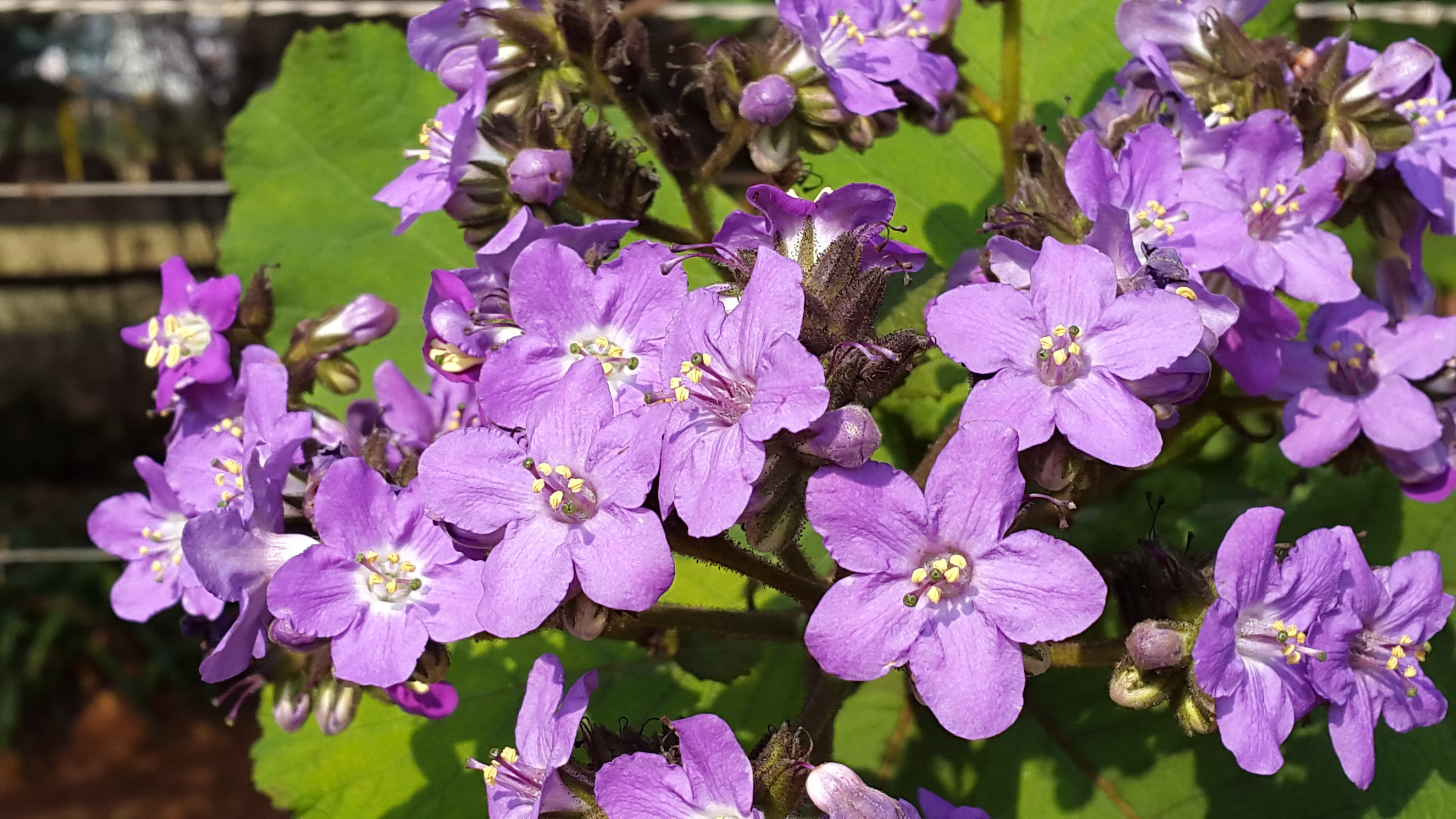
Detail of the flowers

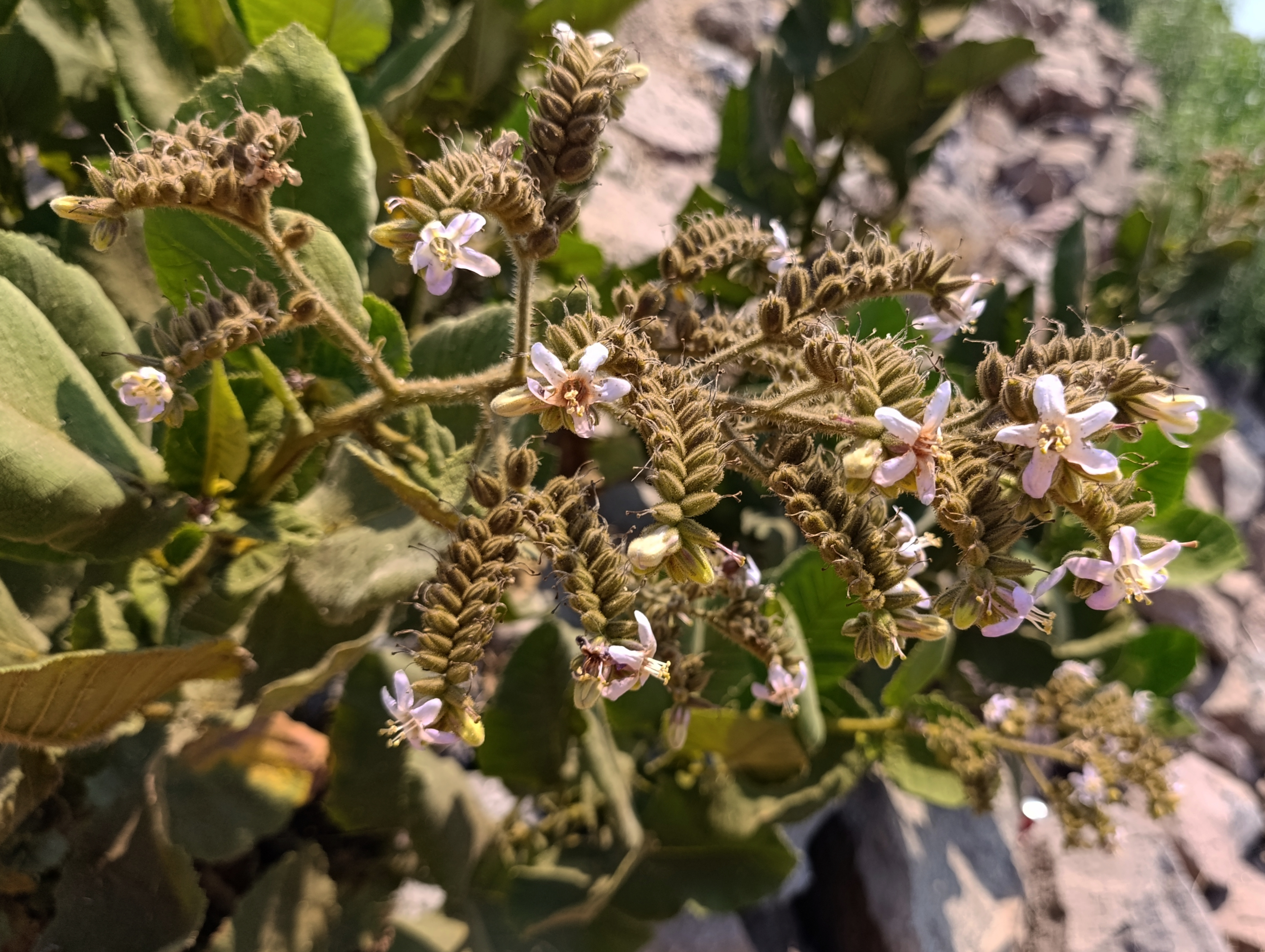
Flowers and seeds

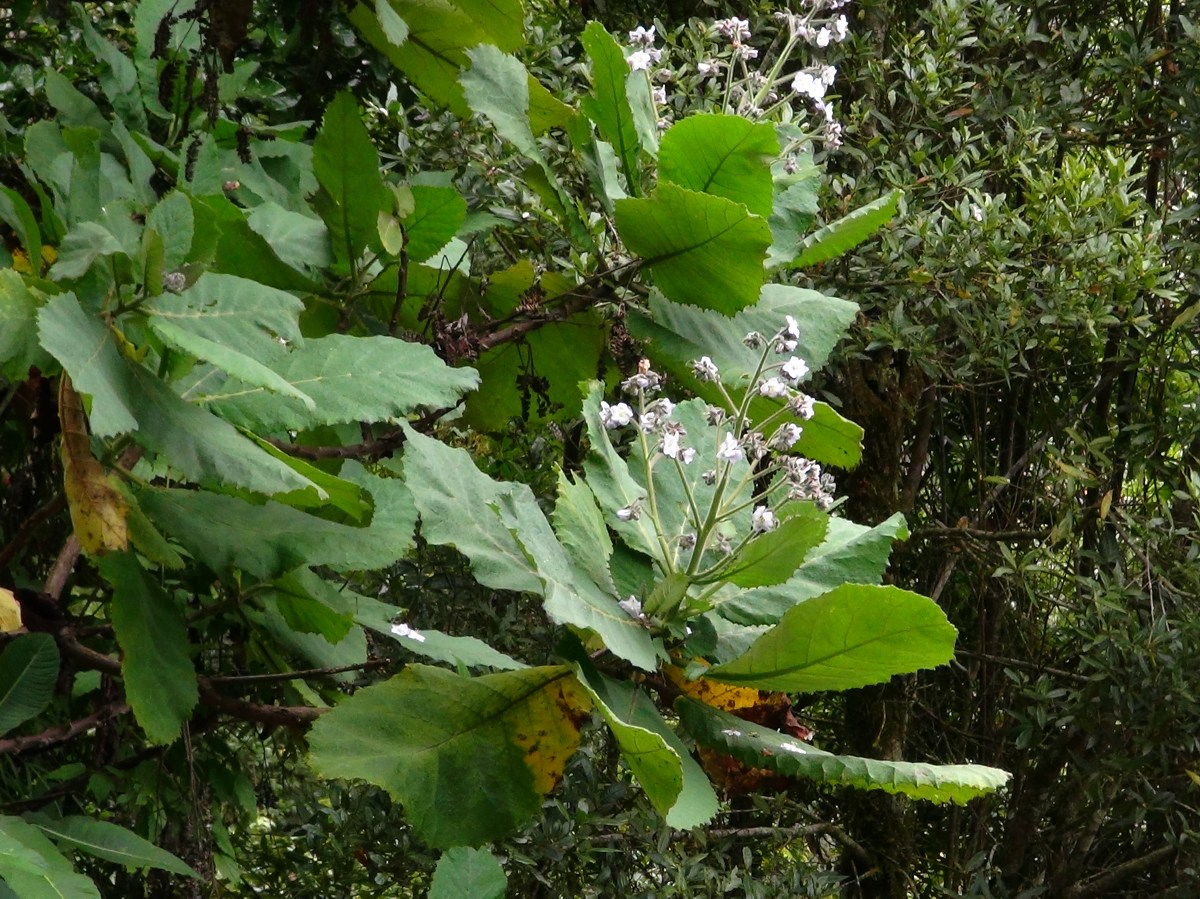
The foliage
