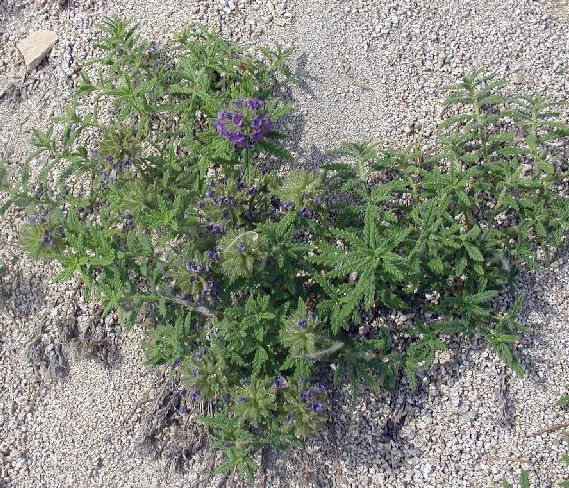

Conservation status
- Apparently Secure (NatureServe)

Scientific classification
- Kingdom: Plantae
- Clade: Tracheophytes
- Clade: Angiosperms
- Clade: Eudicots
- Clade: Asterids
- Order: Boraginales
- Family: Namaceae
- Genus: Nama
- Species: N. rothrockii

Binomial name
- Nama rothrockii A.Gray

= Nama rothrockii =

Species of flowering plant

Nama rothrockii is a species of flowering plant in the family Namaceae known by the common name Rothrock's fiddleleaf. It is native to the mountains and plateaus of eastern California, such as the southern Sierra Nevada, and western Nevada and Arizona, where it grows in several types of local habitat.

== Description ==
Nama rothrockii is a rhizomatous perennial herb with erect and spreading stems up to about 30 centimetres (12 in) long. It grows in colonies of clumpy individual plants. It is hairy to bristly, glandular, and sticky in texture. The lance-shaped to narrowly oval green leaves are 2 to 6 centimetres (0.79 to 2.36 in) long and lined with regular teeth.

The inflorescence is a somewhat spherical head of flowers with densely hairy sepals. Each funnel-shaped flower is about 1.5 centimetres (0.59 in) long and a centimetre wide at the face. The flowers are pink, light to deep purple, or pale blue in color.
