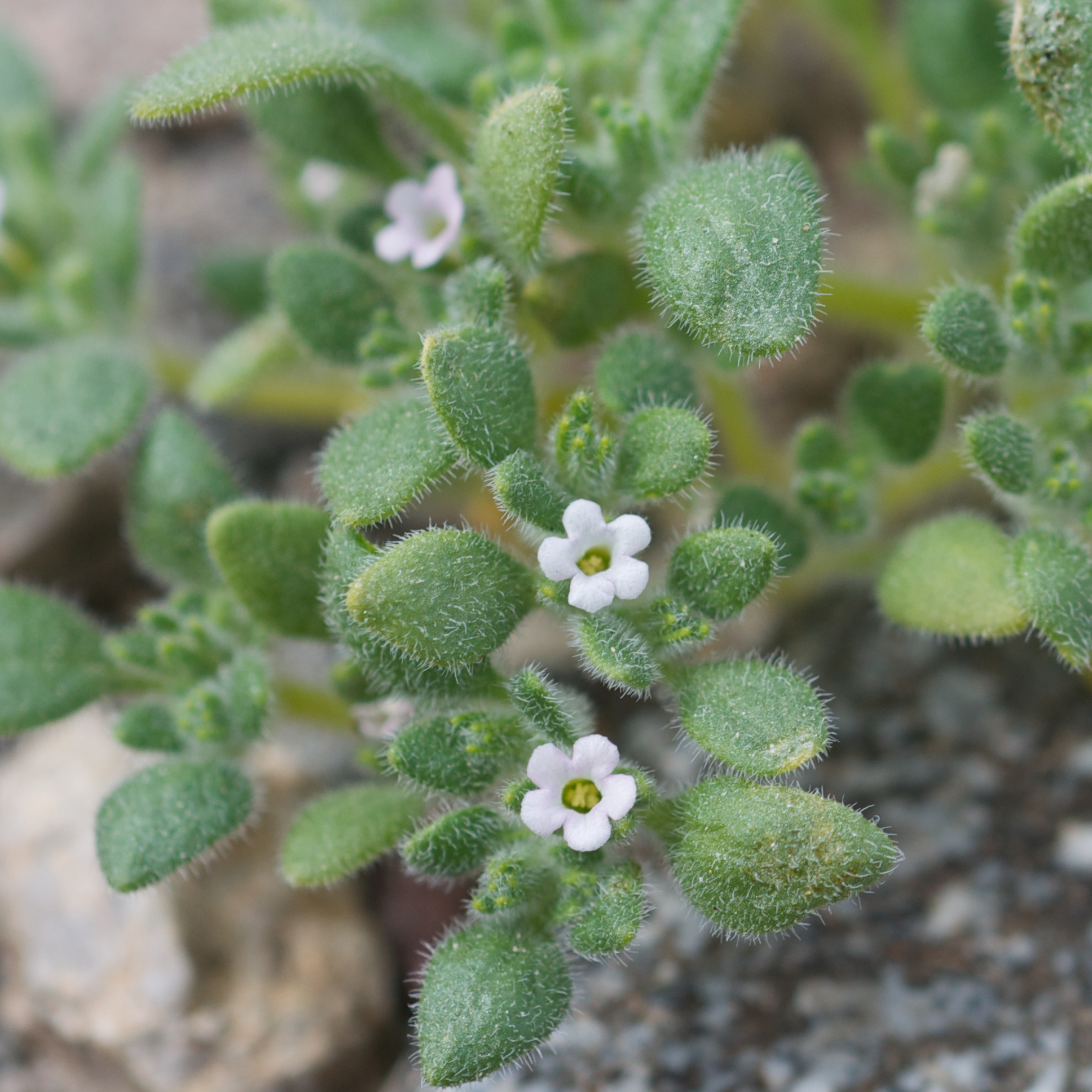

Conservation status
- Apparently Secure (NatureServe)

Scientific classification
- Kingdom: Plantae
- Clade: Tracheophytes
- Clade: Angiosperms
- Clade: Eudicots
- Clade: Asterids
- Order: Boraginales
- Family: Namaceae
- Genus: Nama
- Species: N. pusilla

Binomial name
- Nama pusilla Lemmon ex A.Gray

= Nama pusilla =

Species of flowering plant

Nama pusilla (also spelt Nama pusillum) is a species of flowering plant in the family Namaceae or a broadly defined Boraginaceae, known by the common name eggleaf fiddleleaf. It is native to the deserts of eastern California and Nevada and Arizona, where it grows in sandy and rocky habitat.

Nama pusilla is a hairy annual plant forming a small patch of prostrate stems no more than about 6 centimetres (2.4 in) long. The fuzzy reddish or green leaves are up to a centimetre long and oval or lance-shaped, with winged petioles. The tiny funnel-shaped flowers are white to pale pink in color and have five-lobed faces just 1 or 2 millimetres wide.
