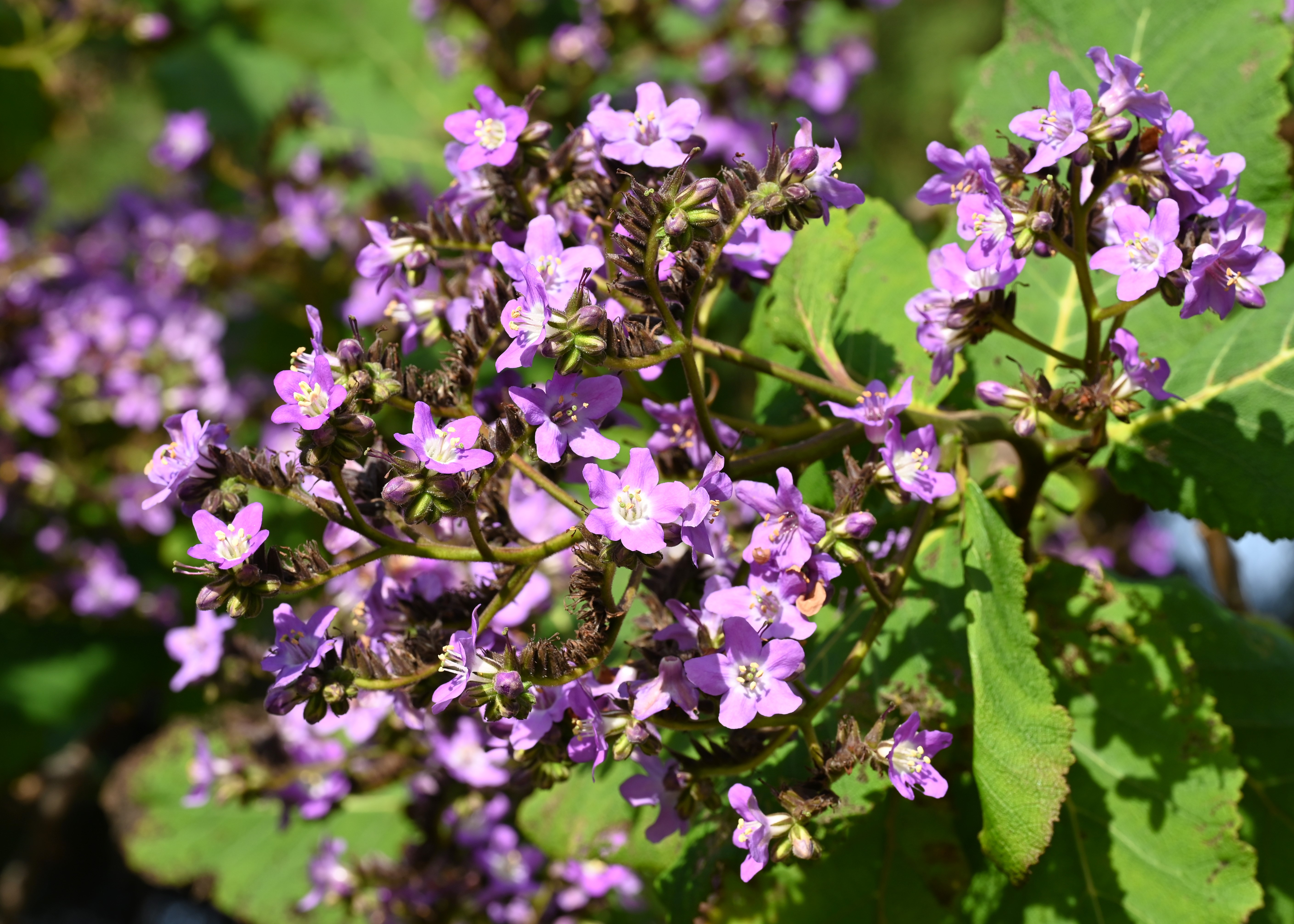
- Wigandia caracasana

Scientific classification
- Kingdom: Plantae
- Clade: Tracheophytes
- Clade: Angiosperms
- Clade: Eudicots
- Clade: Asterids
- Order: Boraginales
- Family: Namaceae
- Genus: Wigandia; Kunth, nom. cons.

Type species
- Wigandia caracasana Kunth

Species
- 6; see text

Synonyms
- Cohiba Raf.; Ernstamra Kuntze, nom. illeg.

= Wigandia =

Genus of flowering plants

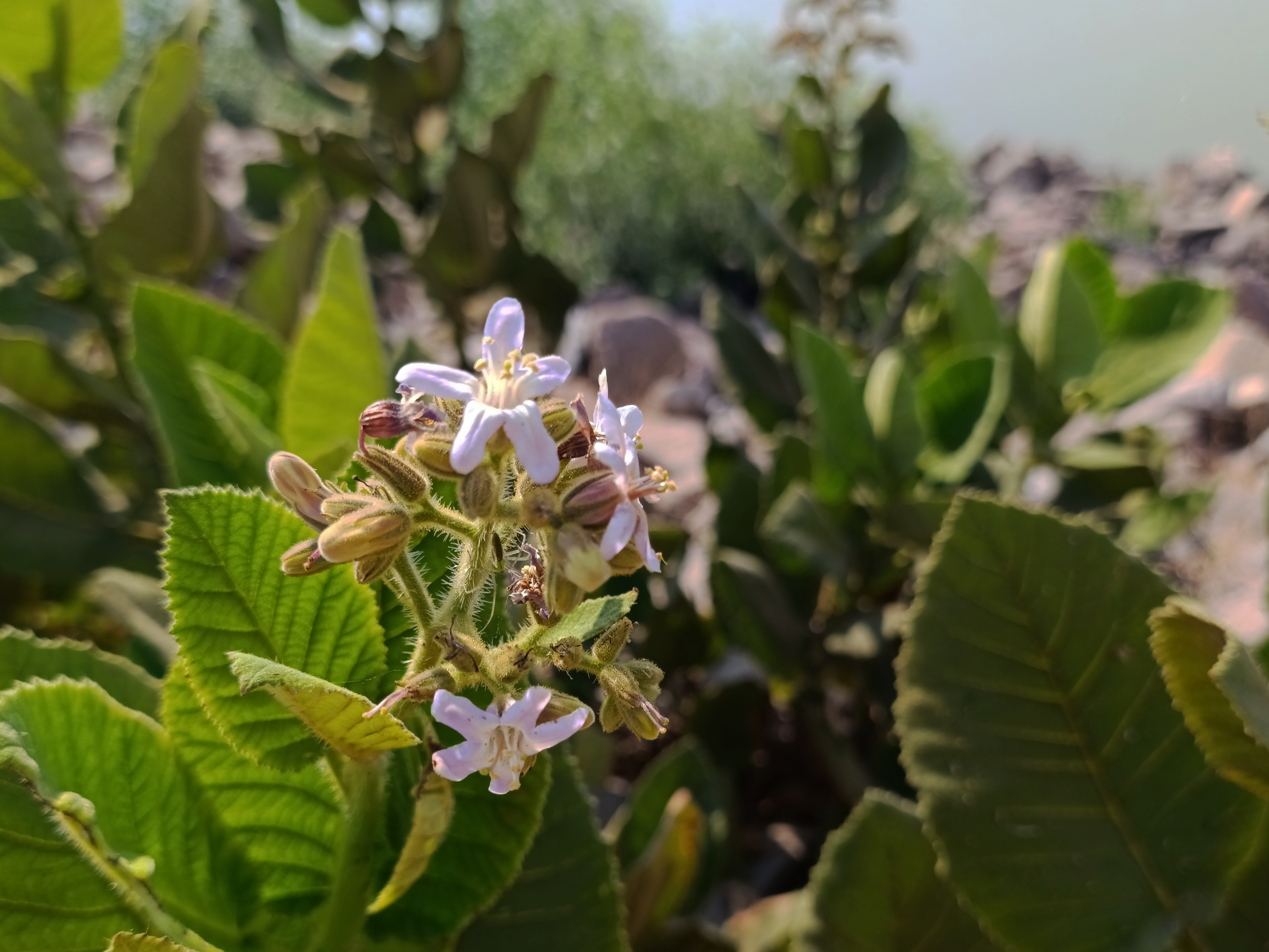
Wigandia urens, also known as "chichicastle manso" in Mexico.

Wigandia is a genus of flowering plants within the family Namaceae. They are found mainly in Central America and South America, though one or two species are found as far north as the United States. Some are grown as ornamental plants and will flourish in most Mediterranean or temperate regions. The genus is named for Johann Wigand (c. 1523–1587), German Lutheran cleric and theologian, and Bishop of Pomesania.

Formerly placed in the family Hydrophyllaceae, Wigandia species are unusual in having minute seeds and a high base chromosome number (19); it is also the only neotropical genus in the group.

Some species originally classified in Wigandia are now treated in other genera, e.g. Eriodictyon. A 1998 molecular phylogenetic analysis included two Wigandia species (W. caracasana and W. urens, now considered synonymous), and confirmed that they lay within a clade that includes Eriodictyon, and also the genera Nama and Turricula (now synonymized with Eriodictyon). As of December 2025, World Flora Online placed Wigandia in the segregate family Namaceae.

== Species ==
Six species are currently accepted.

- Wigandia brevistyla Cornejo
- Wigandia crispa (Ruiz & Pav.) Kunth
- Wigandia ecuadorensis Cornejo
- Wigandia pruritiva Spreng.
- Wigandia urens (Ruiz & Pav.) Kunth (synonym Wigandia caracasana Kunth)
- Wigandia wurdackiana Ferreyra

=== Formerly placed here ===
Species formerly classified within Wigandia include:

- Eriodictyon californicum (formerly W. californica)
