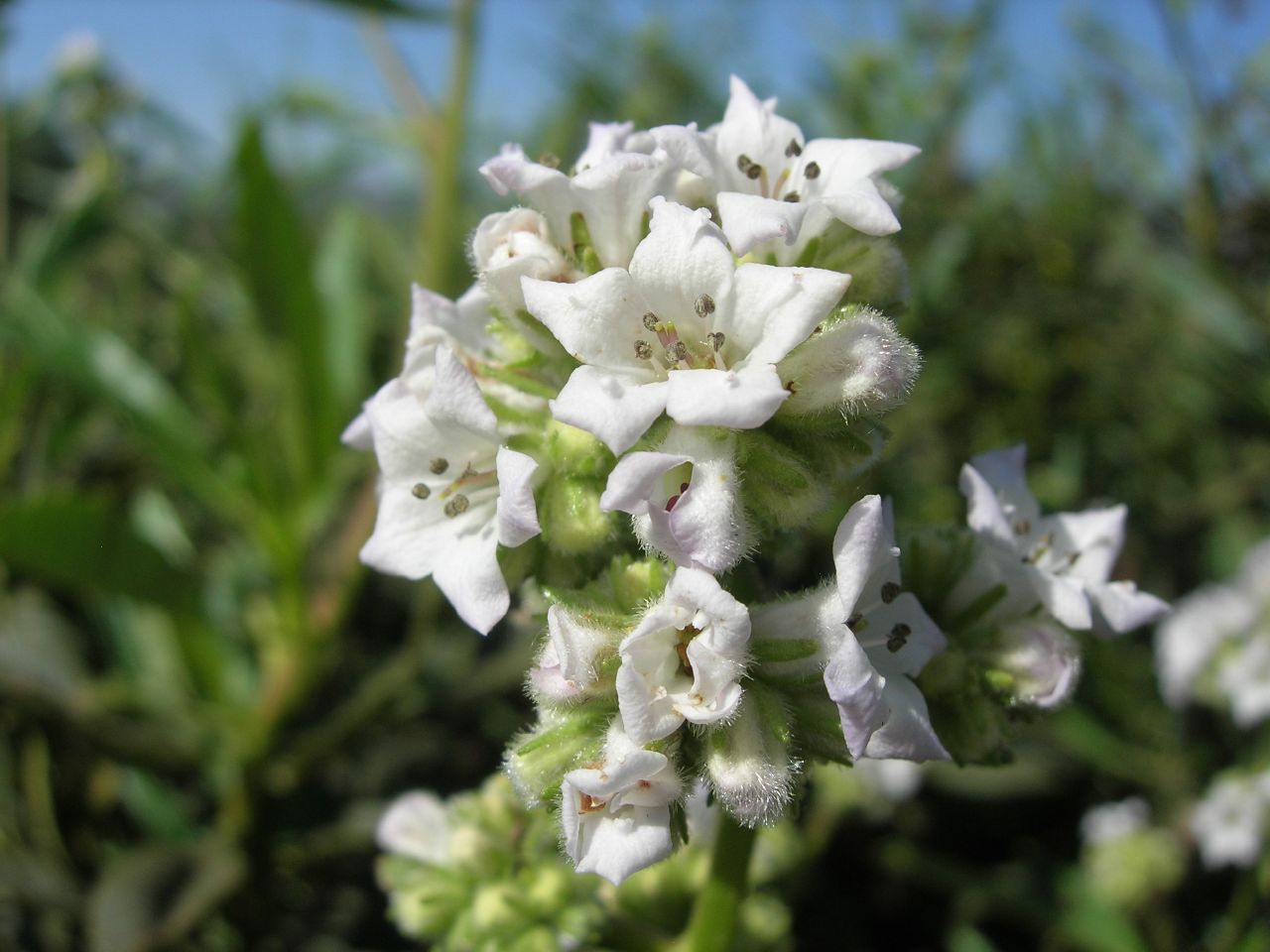

Scientific classification
- Kingdom: Plantae
- Clade: Tracheophytes
- Clade: Angiosperms
- Clade: Eudicots
- Clade: Asterids
- Order: Boraginales
- Family: Namaceae
- Genus: Eriodictyon
- Species: E. trichocalyx

Binomial name
- Eriodictyon trichocalyx A.Heller

= Eriodictyon trichocalyx =

Species of tree

Eriodictyon trichocalyx is a species of flowering plant in the family Namaceae, known by the common name hairy yerba santa.

== Description ==
Eriodictyon trichocalyx is a shrub growing erect up to about 2 meters tall, with lance-shaped to oval leaves up to 14 centimeters long. They are hairless and resinous to densely woolly. The inflorescence is a cluster of white to light purple bell-shaped flowers. At higher elevations, the plant tends to a much smaller stature and often appear more thin and ratty; rare, large plants at these elevations tend to be old and woody, and may have a large, tree-like trunk at their base and a great deal of dead wood and twigs.

== Distribution ==
It is native to Southern California and Baja California, where it grows in several habitat types, including chaparral and grassland. It is similar to E. crassifolium and grows in some of the same areas.

== Medicinal uses ==
The Cahuilla people of California used it to treat coughs, colds, sore throats, asthma, tuberculosis, and catarrh. It was also used as a liniment and a poultice. The Cahuilla also used it as a tea bath, where it relieved rheumatism, tired limbs, fevers, and sores.

The Chumash also used it as a liniment for the feet and chest.
