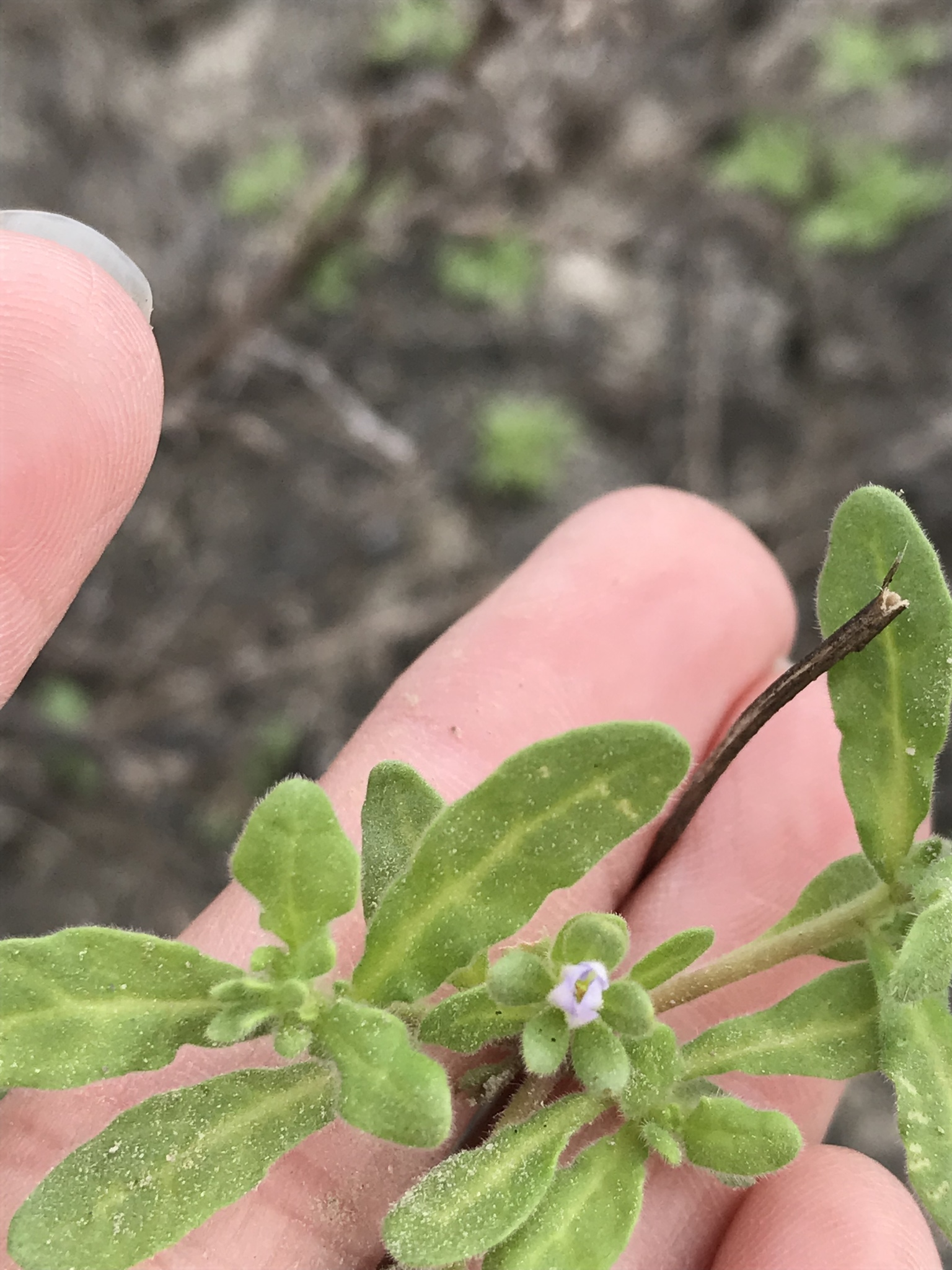

Conservation status
- Apparently Secure (NatureServe)

Scientific classification
- Kingdom: Plantae
- Clade: Tracheophytes
- Clade: Angiosperms
- Clade: Eudicots
- Clade: Asterids
- Order: Boraginales
- Family: Namaceae
- Genus: Nama
- Species: N. stenocarpa

Binomial name
- Nama stenocarpa A.Gray

Synonyms
- Conanthus stenocarpus A.Heller; Marilaunidium stenocarpum (A.Gray) Kuntze; Nama humifusa Brand; Nama micrantha Nees ex Brand; Nama undulata A.Gray, nom. illeg., not Nama undulata Kunth

= Nama stenocarpa =

Species of flowering plant

Nama stenocarpa is a species of flowering plant in the family Namaceae known by the common name mud fiddleleaf. It is native to northern Mexico and areas of southern California, Arizona, and Texas, where it is known from wet habitat such as marshes and swampy valley wetlands.

== Description ==
Nama stenocarpa is a hairy annual herb with a prostrate or upright branching stem up to about 40 centimetres (16 in) long. The oval or spoon-shaped leaves are up to about 3 cm (1.2 in) long, wavy or rolled along the edges, and clasp the stem at their bases. The inflorescence is a cluster of white flowers and their bristly, leaflike sepals. Each funnel-shaped flower is about half a centimetre long and wide with a lobed face.
