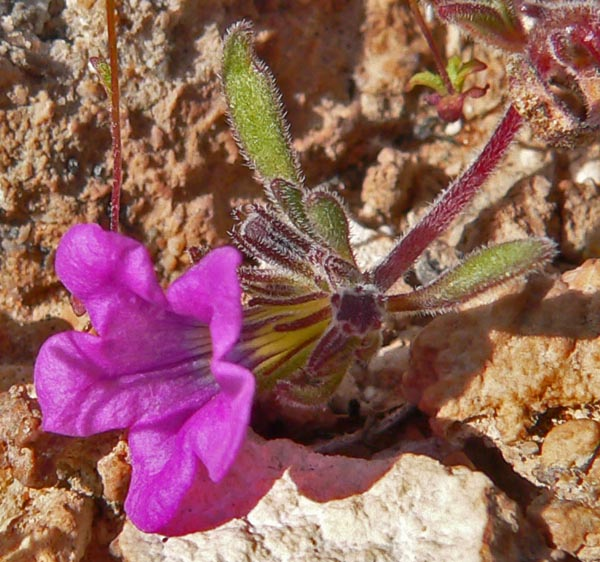
- Nama demissa, Nevada desert

Scientific classification
- Kingdom: Plantae
- Clade: Tracheophytes
- Clade: Angiosperms
- Clade: Eudicots
- Clade: Asterids
- Order: Boraginales
- Family: Namaceae
- Genus: Nama; L.

Type species
- Nama jamaicense L.

Species
- See text.

Synonyms
- Andropus Brand; Conanthus S.Watson; Lemmonia A.Gray; Marilaunidium Kuntze

= Nama (plant) =

Genus of flowering plants

Nama is a genus of herbaceous plants belonging to the family Namaceae or a broadly defined family Boraginaceae. Most are found in western North America. Many are known by the common name fiddleleaf.

== Taxonomy ==
Carl Linnaeus created some confusion by using the genus name Nama twice – in 1753 for the type species Nama zeylanica and in 1759 for the type species Nama jamaicensis. The later of the two has been conserved over the earlier, the correct name for which is now Hydrolea.

There has been some further confusion over the gender of Nama. The Greek νᾶμα (náma), referring to 'flowing water', is neuter, and some sources have used neuter endings in specific epithets (e.g. the USDA Plants database as of March 2026). However, the genus has traditionally been treated as feminine (e.g. by A. P. de Candolle in 1846), and Tropicos notes that feminine gender is "automatically conserved".

=== Species ===
As of March 2026, Plants of the World Online accepted the following species. English names are from the Integrated Taxonomic Information System.

- Nama aretioides (Hook. & Arn.) Brand – ground nama
- Nama arizonica R.A.Crawford & G.Rink – Arizona fiddleleaf
- Nama asuncionensis León de la Luz & Rebman
- Nama bartlettii Standl.
- Nama biflora Choisy
- Nama californica (A.Gray) J.D.Bacon – California fiddleleaf
- Nama canescens C.L.Hitchc.
- Nama carnosa (Wooton) C.L.Hitchc. – sand fiddleleaf
- Nama constancei J.D.Bacon
- Nama coulteri A.Gray
- Nama cuatrocienegensis G.L.Nesom
- Nama cubana P.Wilson
- Nama demissa A.Gray – purple mat
- Nama densa Lemmon – leafy nama
- Nama depressa Lemmon ex A.Gray – depressed fiddleleaf
- Nama dichotoma (Ruiz & Pav.) Choisy – wishbone fiddleleaf
- Nama ehrenbergii Brand
- Nama flavescens Brandegee
- Nama havardii A.Gray
- Nama hintoniorum G.L.Nesom – Havard's fiddleleaf
- Nama hirsuta M.Martens & Galeotti
- Nama hispida A.Gray – sand bells, bristly nama
- Nama hitchcockii J.D.Bacon
- Nama jamaicensis L. – Jamaicanweed
- Nama johnstonii C.L.Hitchc.
- Nama linearis D.L.Nash
- Nama lobbii A.Gray – Lobb's fiddleleaf
- Nama marshii (Standl.) I.M.Johnst.
- Nama origanifolia Kunth
- Nama orizabensis D.L.Nash
- Nama palmeri A.Gray
- Nama parviflora (Greenm.) Constance
- Nama parvifolia (Torr.) Greenm. – small-leaf fiddleleaf
- Nama propinqua C.V.Morton & C.L.Hitchc.
- Nama prostrata Brand
- Nama pusilla Lemmon ex A.Gray – eggleaf fiddleleaf
- Nama quiexobrana J.D.Bacon & J.A.McDonald
- Nama retrorsa J.T.Howell – betatakin fiddleleaf
- Nama rothrockii A.Gray – Rothrock's fiddleleaf
- Nama rotundifolia (A.Gray) J.F.Macbr.
- Nama rzedowskii J.D.Bacon
- Nama sandwicensis A.Gray – hinahina kahakai
- Nama schaffneri A.Gray
- Nama segetalis Ricketson
- Nama sericea Willd. ex Schult.
- Nama serpylloides A.Gray – velvet fiddleleaf
- Nama spatulata Brandegee
- Nama stenocarpa A.Gray – mud fiddleleaf
- Nama stenophylla A.Gray – slimpod fiddleleaf
- Nama stevensii C.L.Hitchc. – Stevens' fiddleleaf
- Nama stewartii I.M.Johnst.
- Nama torynophylla Greenm. – matted fiddleleaf
- Nama turneri J.D.Bacon
- Nama undulata Kunth
- Nama xylopoda (Wooton & Standl.) C.L.Hitchc. – yellowseed fiddleleaf

=== Formerly placed here ===
- Evolvulus convolvuloides (Willd.) Stearn (as N. convolvuloides Willd.)
- Eriodictyon parryi (A.Gray) Greene (as N. parryi A.Gray)

== Gallery ==
Nama
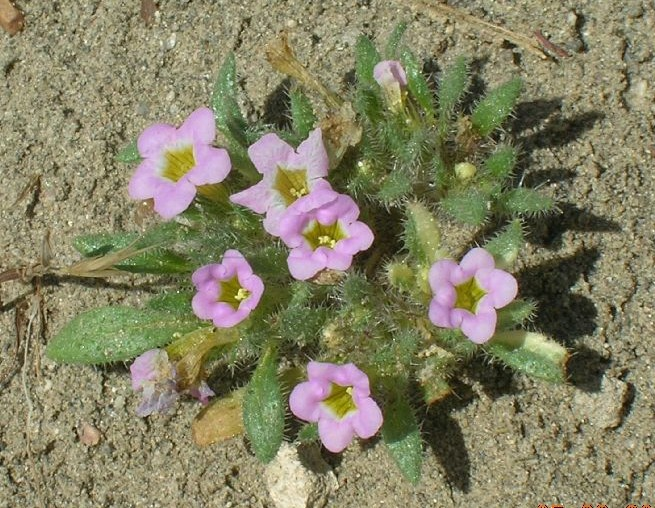
Nama aretioides

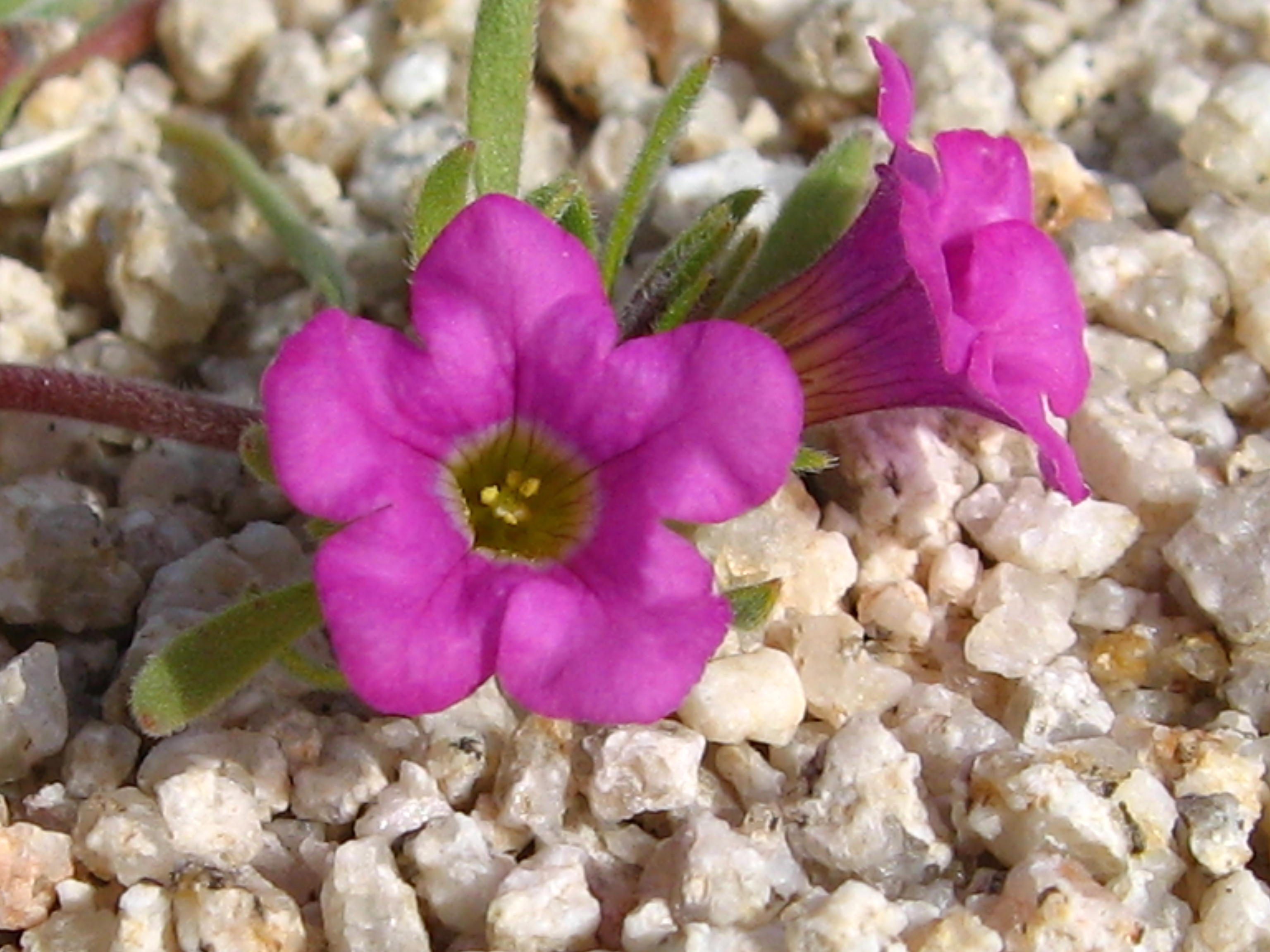
Nama demissa

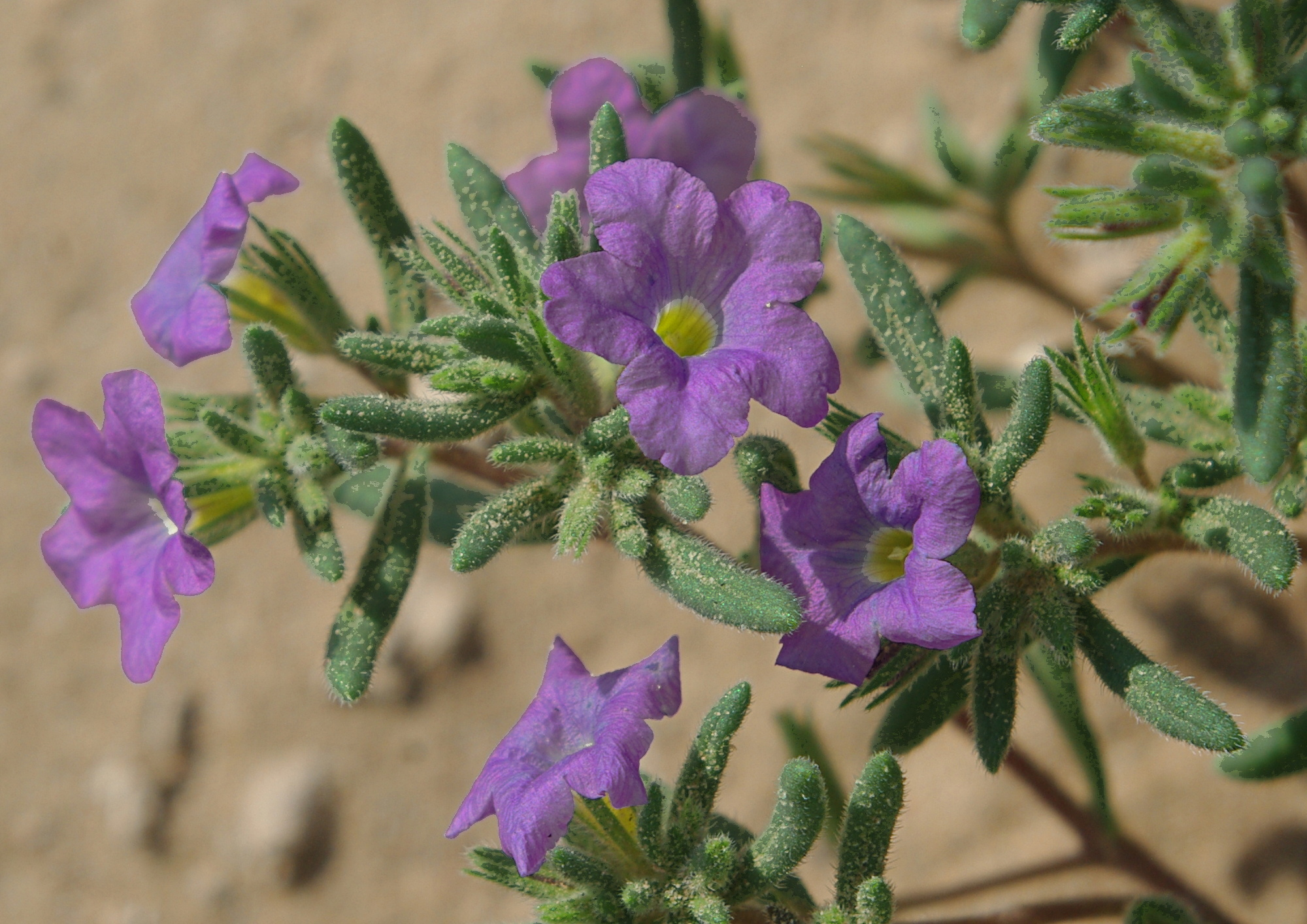
Nama hispida

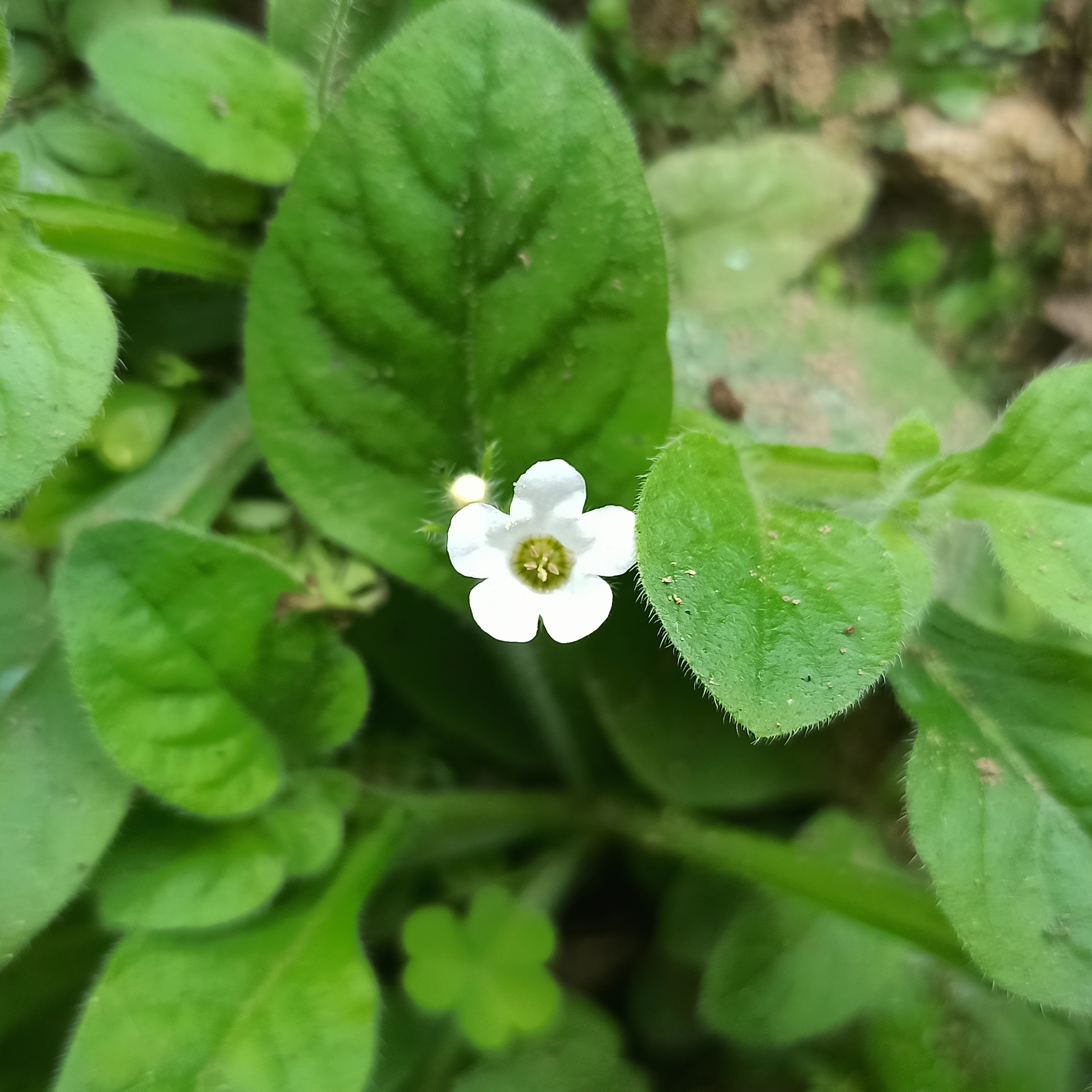
Nama jamaicensis

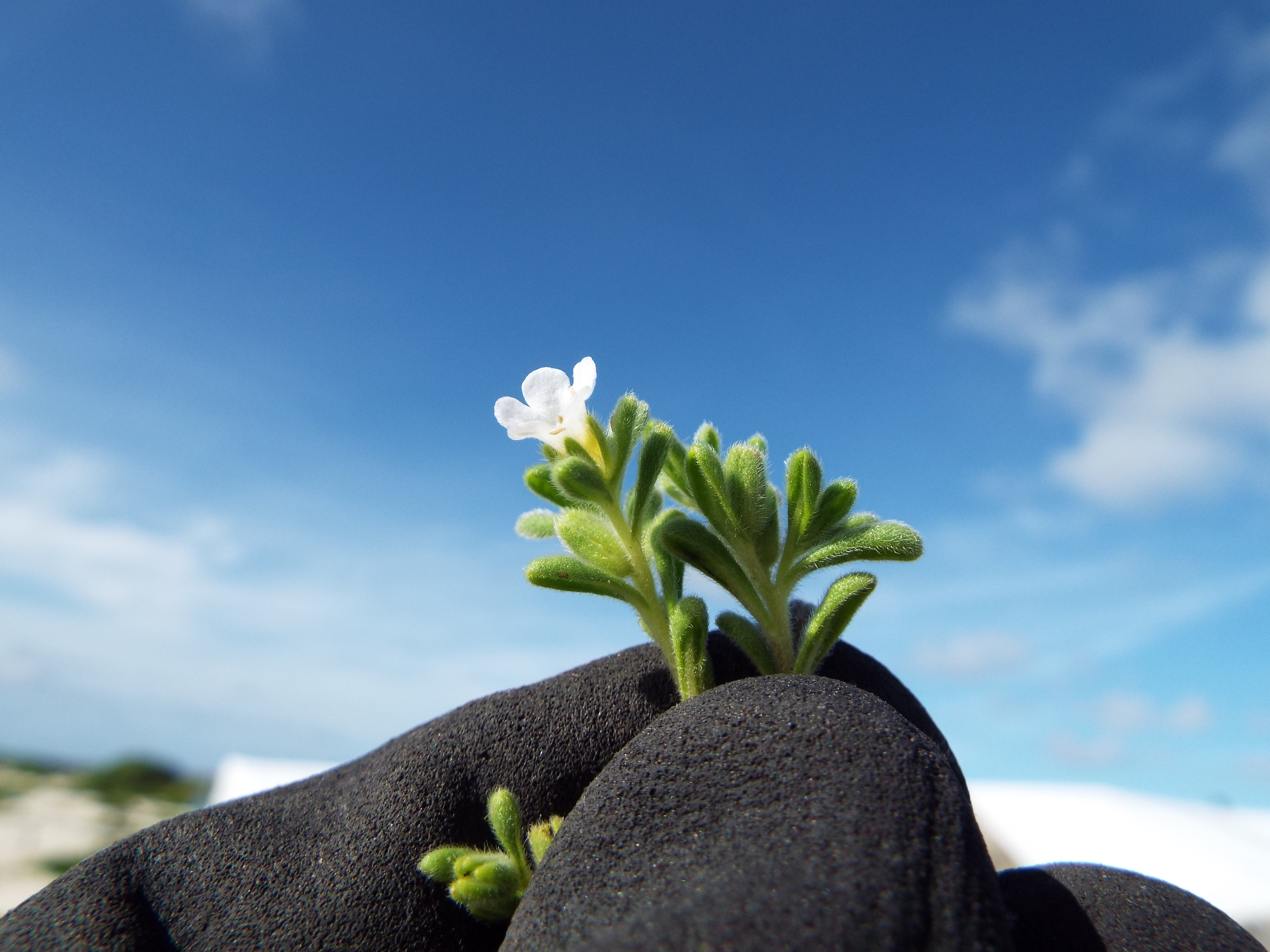
Nama sandwicensis
