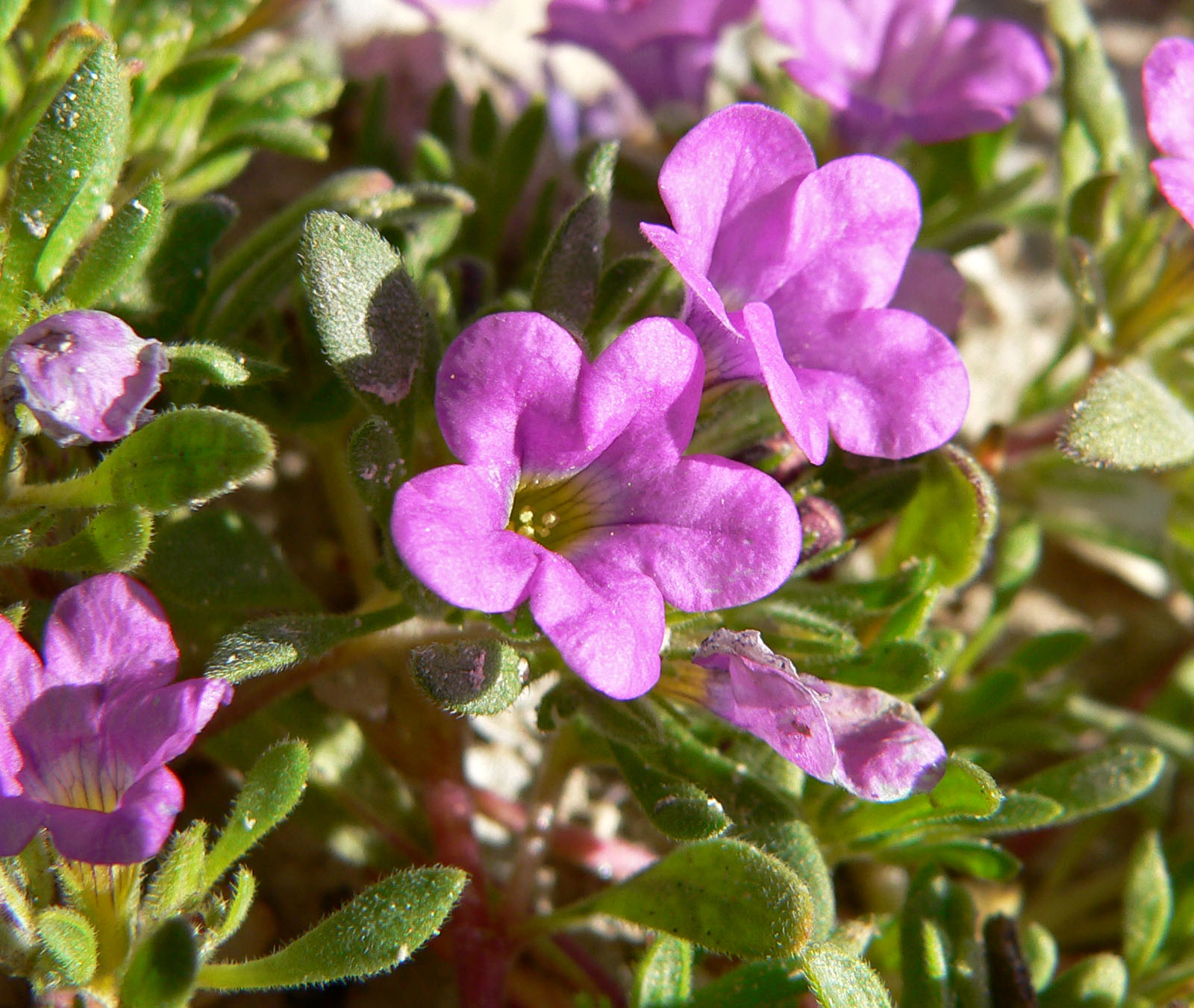
- In the Nevada desert

Conservation status
- Secure (NatureServe)

Scientific classification
- Kingdom: Plantae
- Clade: Tracheophytes
- Clade: Angiosperms
- Clade: Eudicots
- Clade: Asterids
- Order: Boraginales
- Family: Namaceae
- Genus: Nama
- Species: N. demissa

Binomial name
- Nama demissa A.Gray

= Nama demissa =

Species of flowering plant

Nama demissa is an annual flowering plant in the family Boraginaceae. It is known by the common name purplemat, or purple mat.

== Distribution ==
Purple mat, Nama demissa, grows in the American desert southwest, such as the Mojave Desert, and parts of Mexico on dry sandy or gravelly flats from 2,000 to 5,500 ft (610 to 1,680 m) in creosote bush scrub.

== Description ==
Nama demissa grows to three inches (76 mm) high in a small patch of hairy glandular herbage. The flowers range from pinkish to purple. It blooms from February to May.

== Varieties ==
As of March 2026, Plants of the World Online accepted two varieties:

- Nama demissa var. covillei Brand—Coville's purplemat
- Nama demissa var. demissa Gray—purple mat, purplemat
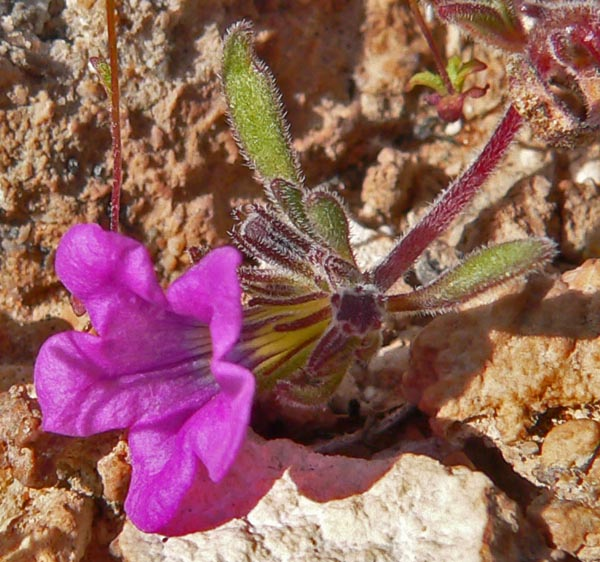

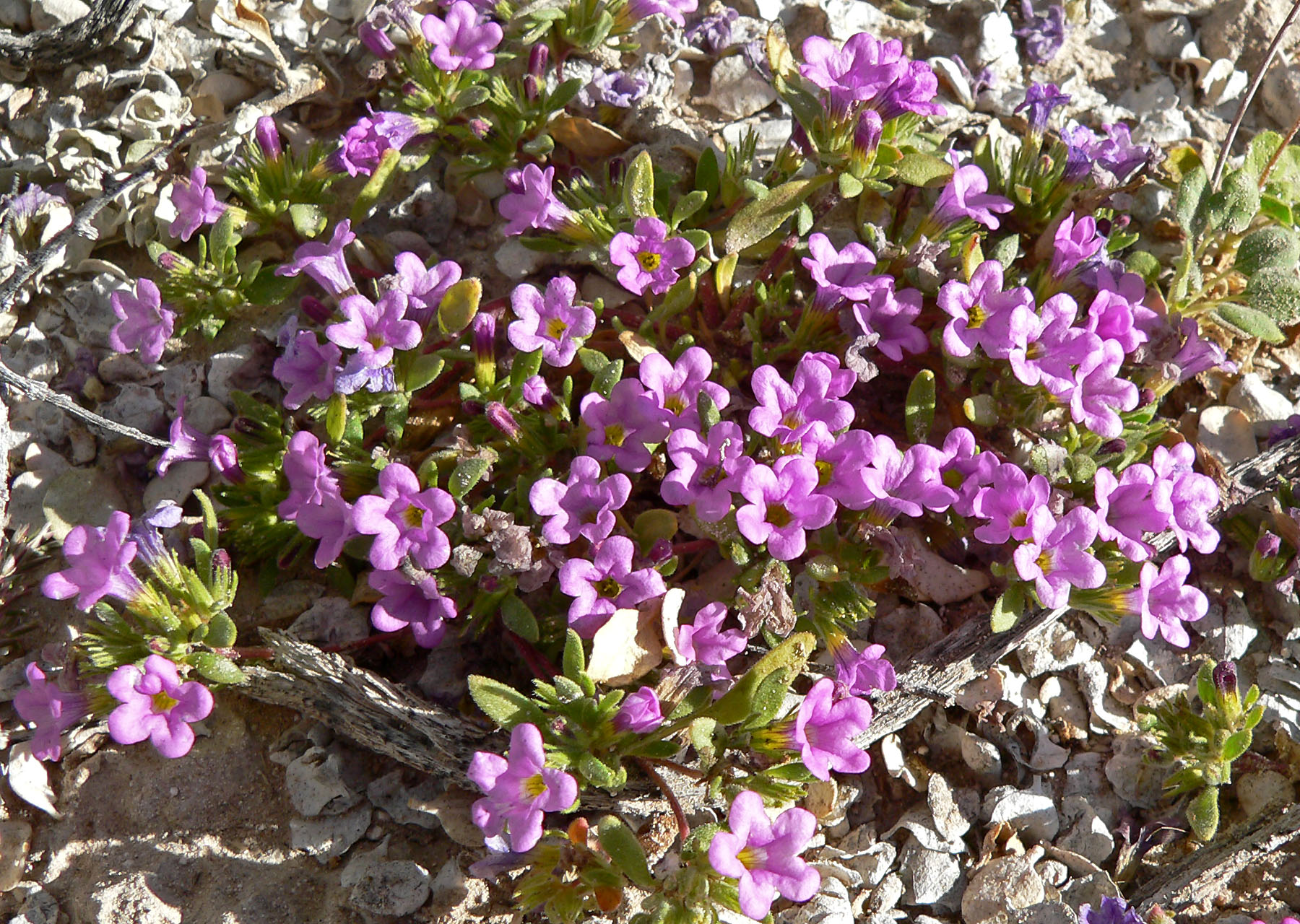

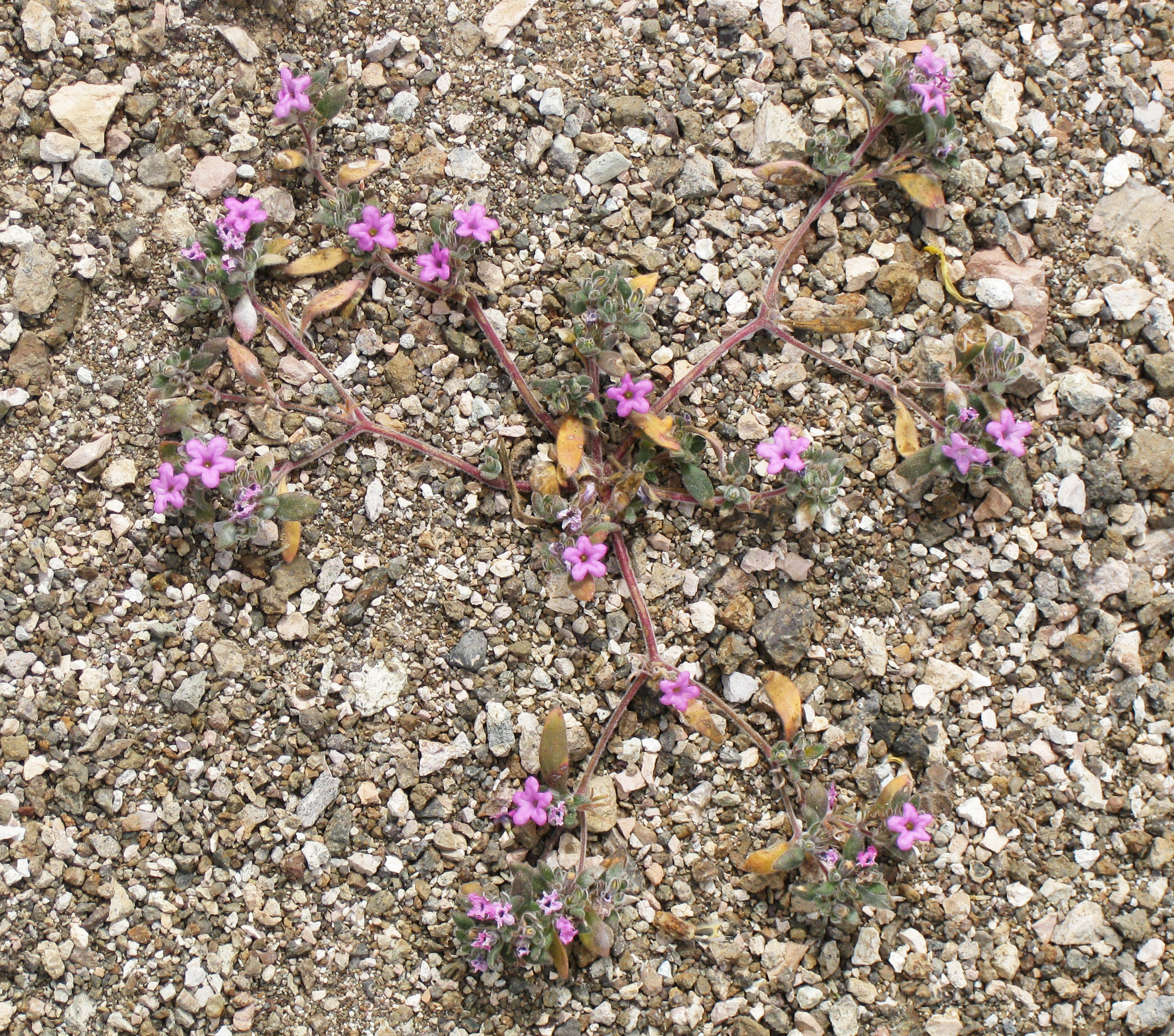

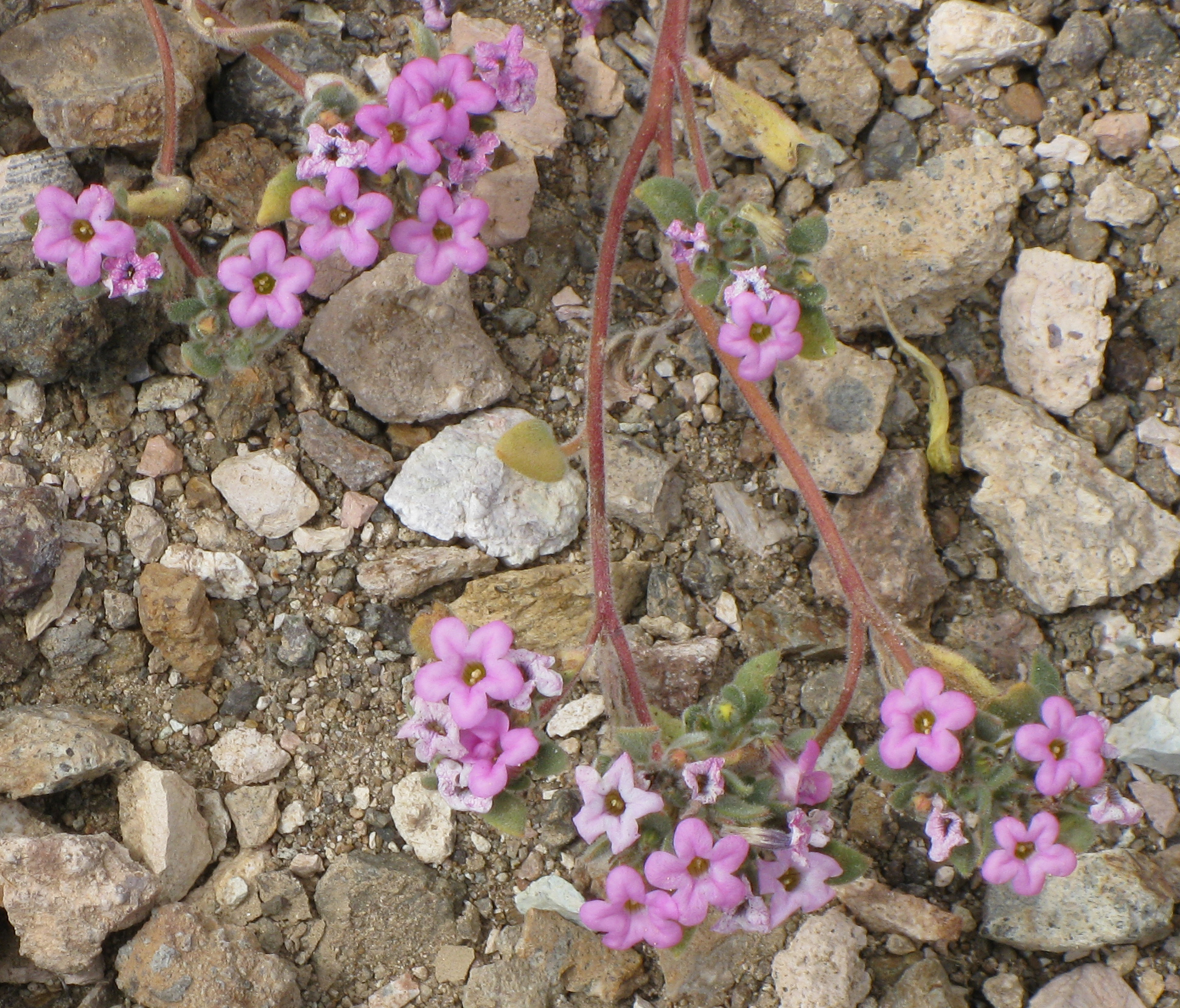
