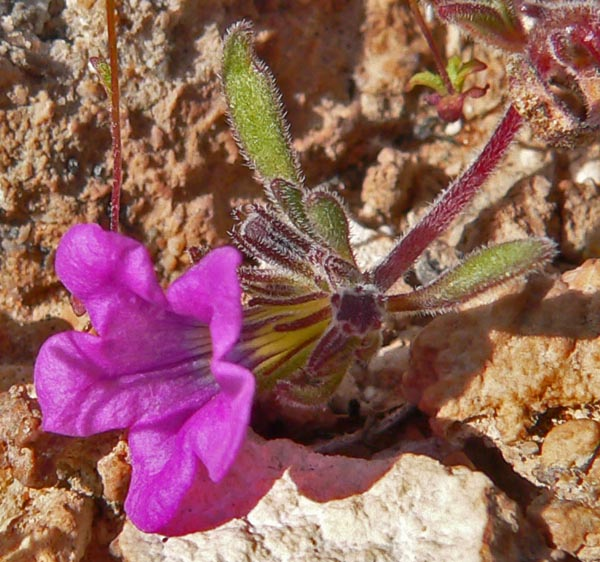
- Nama demissum, Nevada desert

Scientific classification
- Kingdom: Plantae
- Clade: Tracheophytes
- Clade: Angiosperms
- Clade: Eudicots
- Clade: Asterids
- Order: Boraginales
- Family: Namaceae; Molinari

Genera
- See text.

= Namaceae =

Family of flowering plants

Namaceae is a small family of flowering plants in the order Boraginales with three accepted genera as of December 2025. Its taxonomic status remains unclear as of March 2026. Some sources place its genera in a broadly defined Boraginaceae. A 2025 paper suggested that it should be re-included within Hydrophyllaceae.

== Taxonomy ==
In the 2016 APG IV system, the order Boraginales has only one very broadly circumscribed family Boraginaceae. Although Boraginaceae was known not to be monophyletic, there was insufficient support to divide up the family. Following the publication of APG IV, a collaborative group, the Boraginales Working Group, published an alternative taxonomy based on the phylogenetic relationships within the Boraginaceae s.l. This divided the order Boraginales into 11 families, including Namaceae. As of March 2026, Namaceae was accepted by many taxonomic sources, but not by Plants of the World Online, which places the genera of Namaceae in Boraginaceae. A 2025 phylogenetic analysis based on both genetic and morphological data suggested that Namaceae should be re-included within Hydrophyllaceae.

=== Genera ===
As of December 2025, the following three genera were accepted by World Flora Online:

- Eriodictyon Benth.
- Nama L.
- Wigandia Kunth
