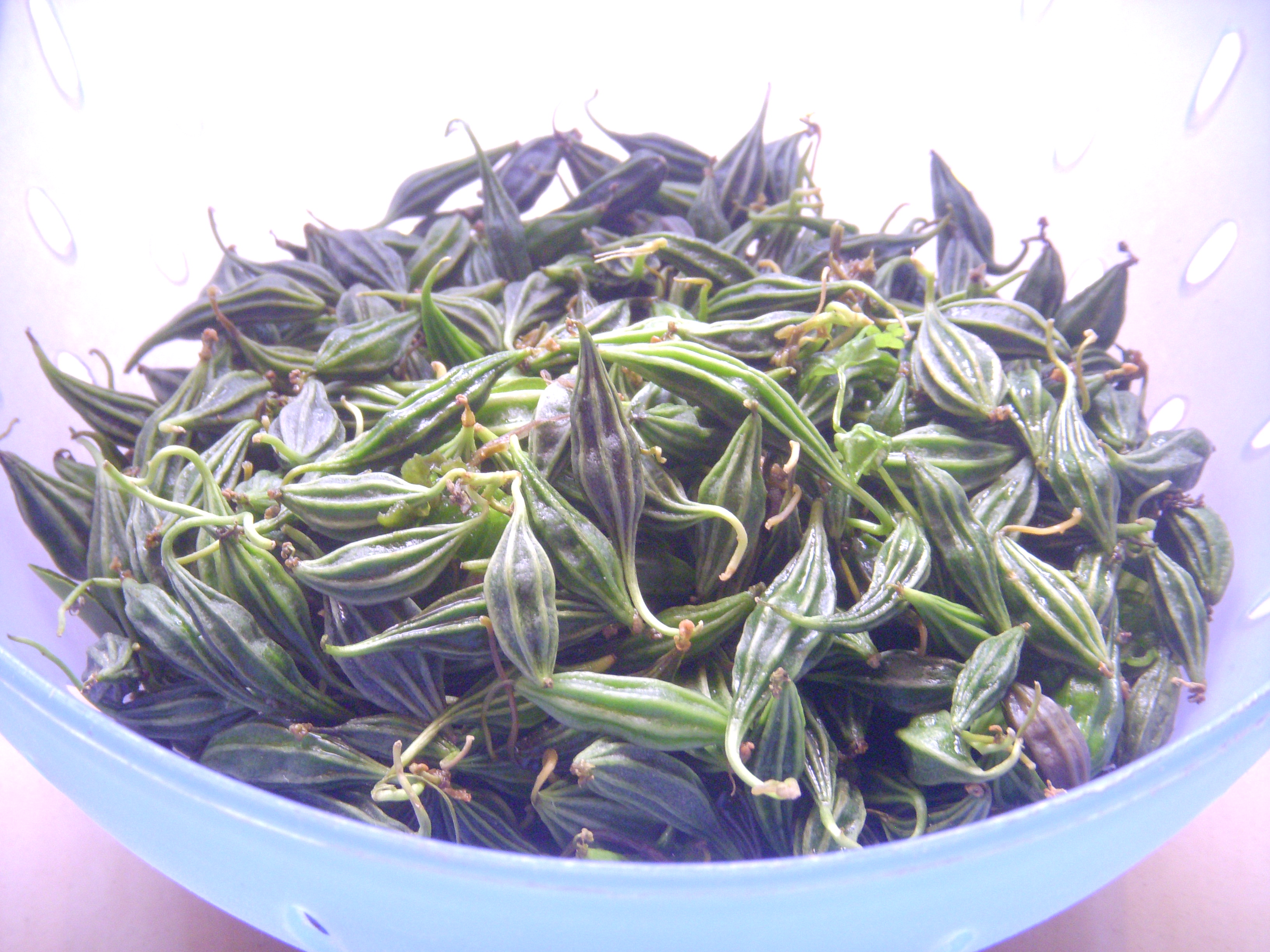
- Momordica cymbalaria fruits

Scientific classification
- Kingdom: Plantae
- Clade: Tracheophytes
- Clade: Angiosperms
- Clade: Eudicots
- Clade: Rosids
- Order: Cucurbitales
- Family: Cucurbitaceae
- Genus: Momordica
- Species: M. cymbalaria

Binomial name
- Momordica cymbalaria Hook.f., 1871

Synonyms
- Luffa tuberosa (Roxb.); Momordica tuberosa (Roxb.)

= Momordica cymbalaria =

Species of flowering plant

Momordica cymbalaria is a vine of the genus Momordica found in the Indian states of Andhra Pradesh, Karnataka, Madhya Pradesh, Maharashtra, and Tamil Nadu. It is a relative of the bitter melon plant (M. charantia). The plant has also been named Luffa tuberosa (Roxb.) or Momordica tuberosa (Roxb.)

== Research ==
Pharmacological studies have examined possible action of extracts of the plant in animal models of disease. The water extract was reported to have hypoglycemic activity in diabetic rabbits but not in normal rabbits. The ethanol extract was reported to protect rats from isoproterenol-induced myocardial injury.

== See also ==
- Momordica charantia or bitter melon, a widely grown edible relative.
- Momordica balsamina or balsam apple.
- Momordica foetida an African relative.
- Momordica cochinchinensis or scarlet eggplant, a Vietnamese relative.
