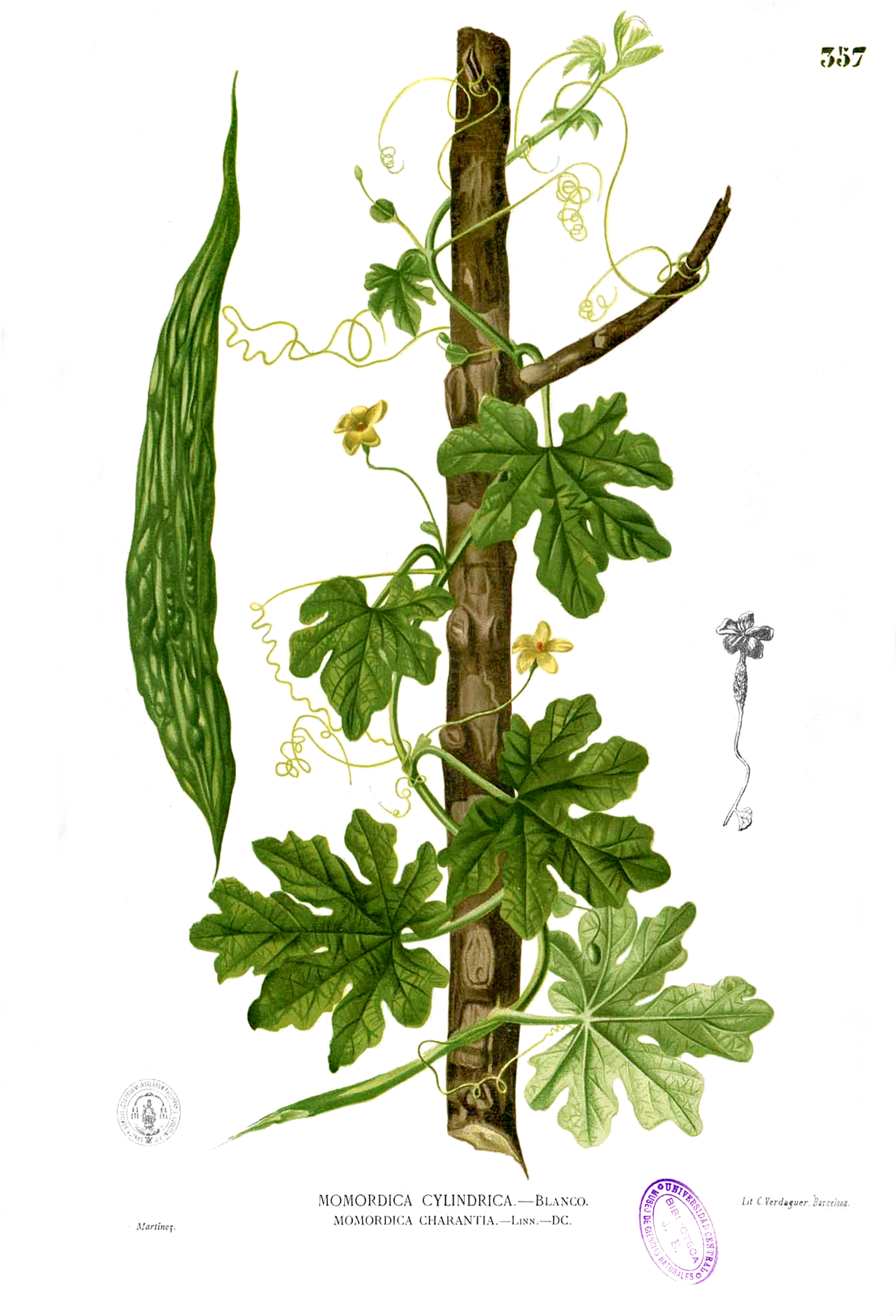

Scientific classification
- Kingdom: Plantae
- Clade: Tracheophytes
- Clade: Angiosperms
- Clade: Eudicots
- Clade: Rosids
- Order: Cucurbitales
- Family: Cucurbitaceae
- Genus: Momordica
- Species: M. charantia

Binomial name
- Momordica charantia L.

= Momordica charantia =

Species of plant in the gourd family

Momordica charantia (commonly called bitter melon, gouya, cerassee, goya, bitter apple, bitter gourd, bitter squash, balsam-pear, karela, karavila and many more names listed below) is a tropical and subtropical vine of the family Cucurbitaceae, widely grown in Asia, Africa, and the Caribbean for its edible fruit. Its many varieties differ substantially in the shape and bitterness of the fruit.

Its native range is distributed from Tropical and Subtropical Old World to South Pacific. Bitter melon originated in Africa and Asia, where it was a dry-season staple food of ǃKung hunter-gatherers. Wild or semi-domesticated variants spread across Asia in prehistory, and it was likely fully domesticated in Southeast Asia. It is widely used in the cuisines of East Asia, South Asia, and Southeast Asia.

== Description ==
This herbaceous, tendril-bearing vine grows up to 5 m (16 ft) in length. It bears simple, alternate leaves 4–12 cm (1.6–4.7 in) across, with three to seven deeply separated lobes. Each plant bears separate yellow male and female flowers. In the Northern Hemisphere, flowering occurs from June to July, and fruiting from September to November. It is a frost-tender annual in the temperate zone and a perennial in the tropics. It grows best in the USDA zones 9 to 11.

The fruit has a distinctive warty exterior and an oblong shape. It is hollow in cross-section, with a relatively thin layer of flesh surrounding a central seed cavity filled with large, flat seeds and pith. The fruit is most often eaten green, or as it is beginning to turn yellow. At this stage, the fruit's flesh is crunchy and watery in texture, similar to cucumber, chayote, or green bell pepper, but bitter. The skin is tender and edible. Seeds and pith appear white in unripe fruits; they are not intensely bitter and can be removed before cooking.

Some sources claim the flesh (rind) becomes somewhat tougher and more bitter with age, but other sources claim that at least for the common Chinese variety the skin does not change and bitterness decreases with age. The Chinese variety is best harvested light green possibly with a slight yellow tinge or just before. The pith becomes sweet and intensely red; it can be eaten uncooked in this state and is a popular ingredient in some Southeast Asian salads.

When the fruit is fully ripe, it turns orange and soft and splits into segments that curl back to expose seeds covered in bright red pulp.

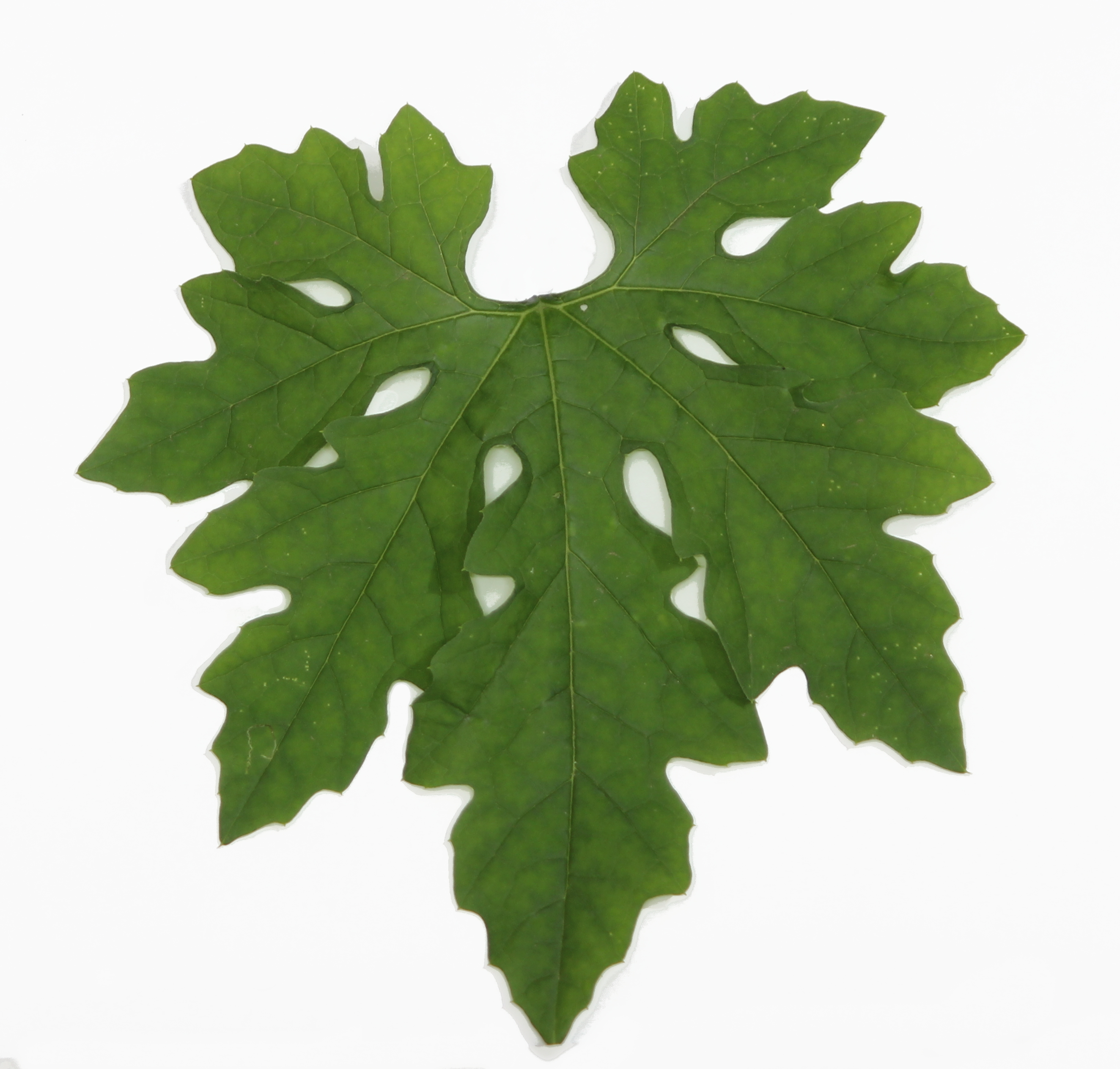
Leaf

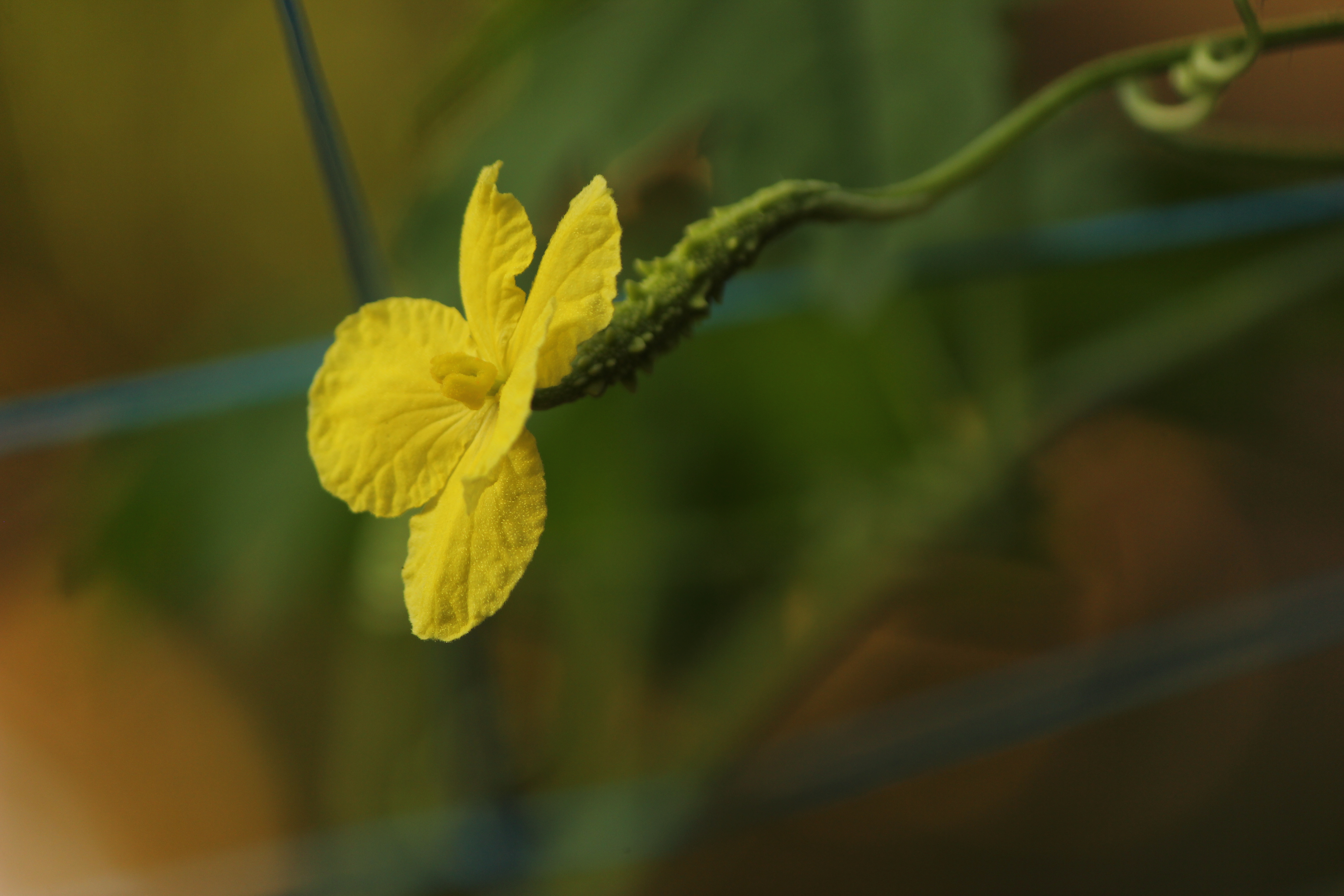
Female flower

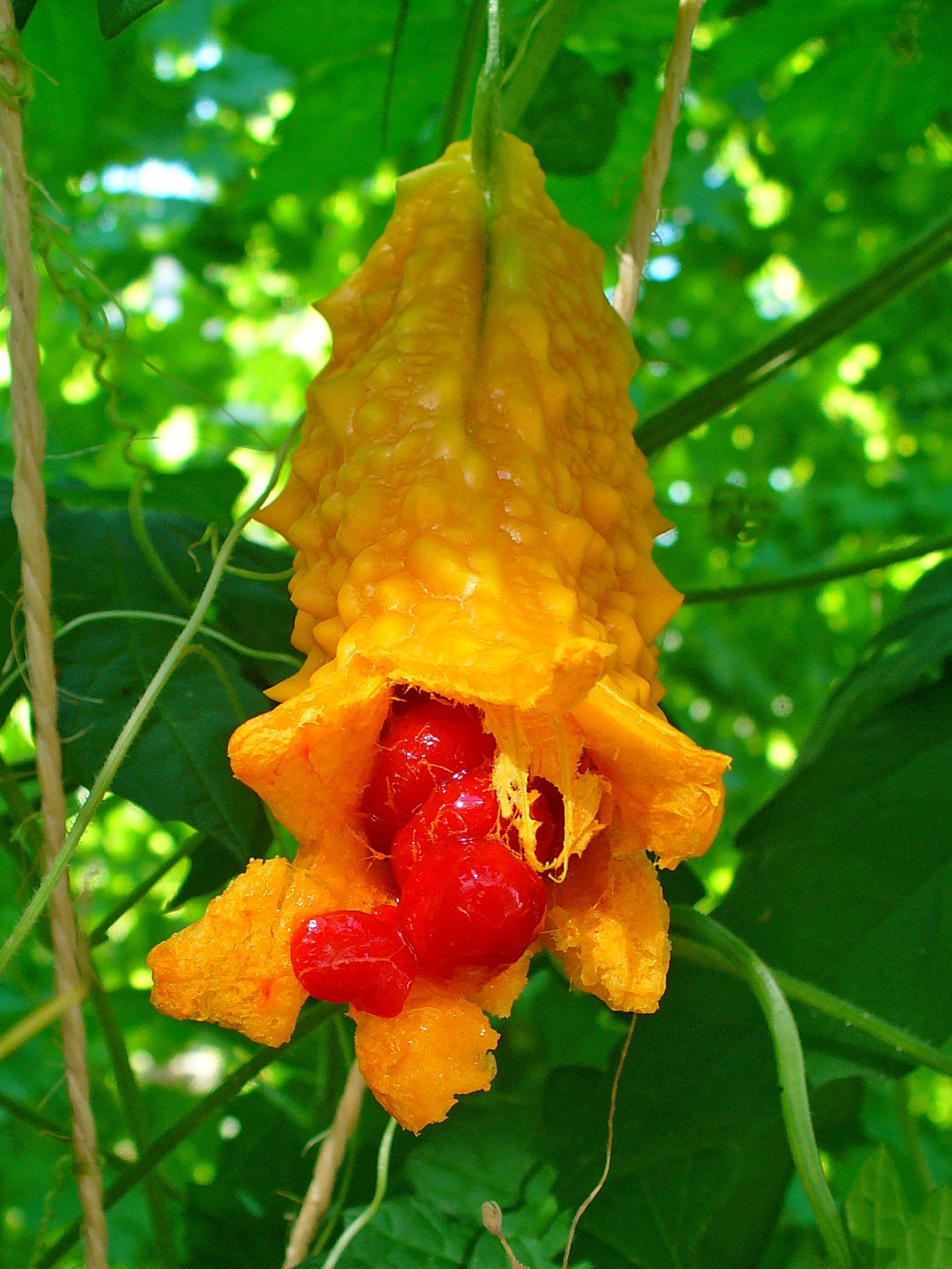
Ripe fruit

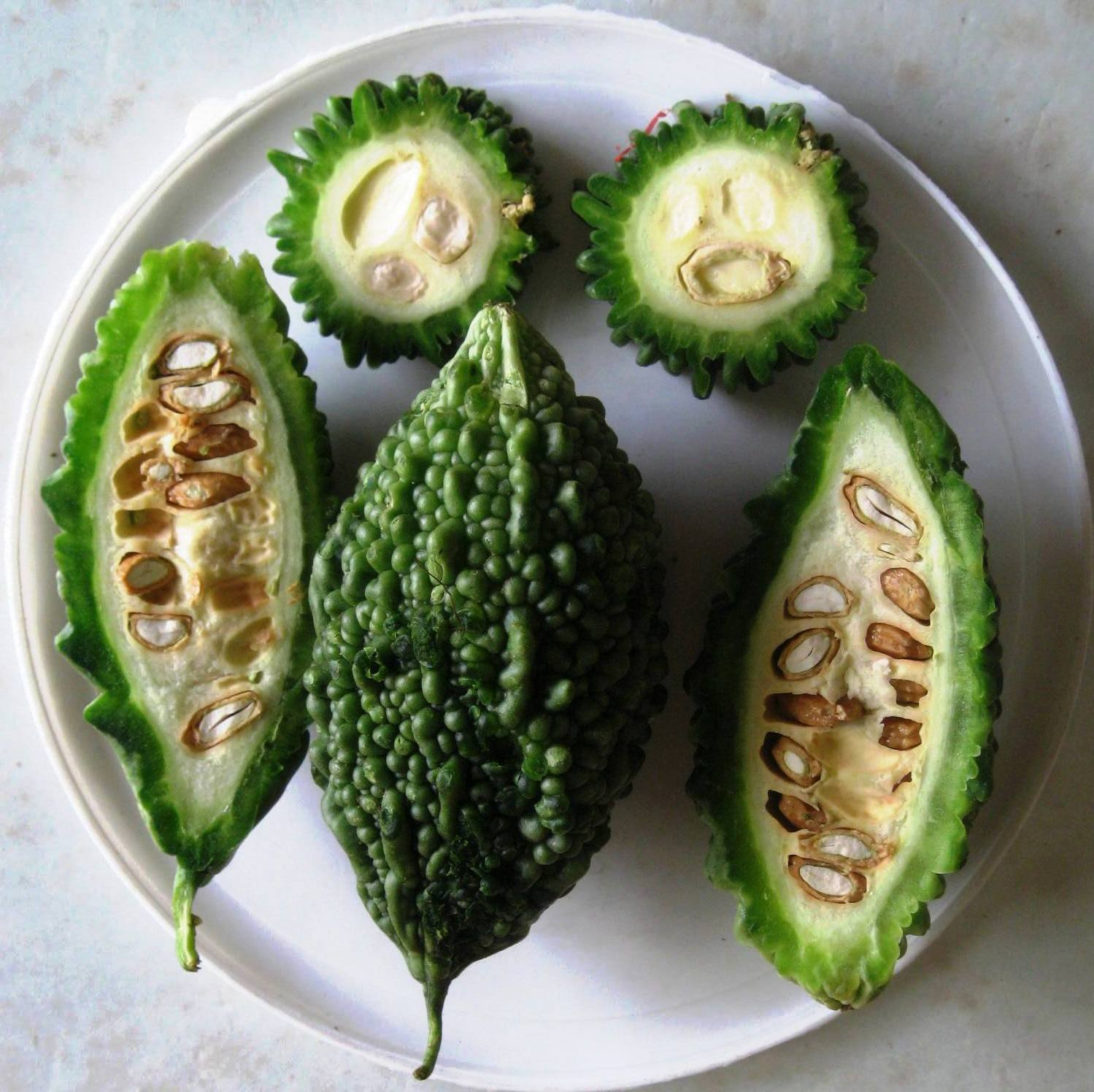
Two halved and two cross sections

=== Varieties ===
Bitter melons come in a variety of shapes and sizes. The common Chinese variety is 20–30 cm (7.9–11.8 in) long, oblong with blunt ends, pale green in color, and has a slightly undulating warty surface. The common Indian bitter melon is narrower in shape, pointed at both ends, and covered with jagged, triangular "teeth" and ridges. It ranges from green to white in color. There are many intermediate shapes between these two extremes. Some bitter melons produce miniature fruits that are only 6–10 cm (2.4–3.9 in) long and are eaten alone as a stuffed vegetable. These miniature fruits are popular in Bangladesh, India, Pakistan, Nepal, and other countries in South Asia. The subcontinental variety is most popular in Bangladesh and India.

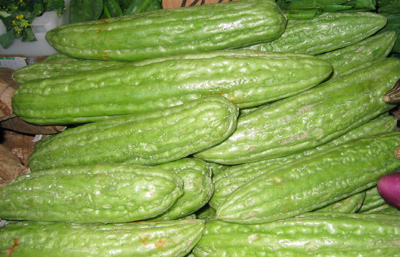
Chinese variety

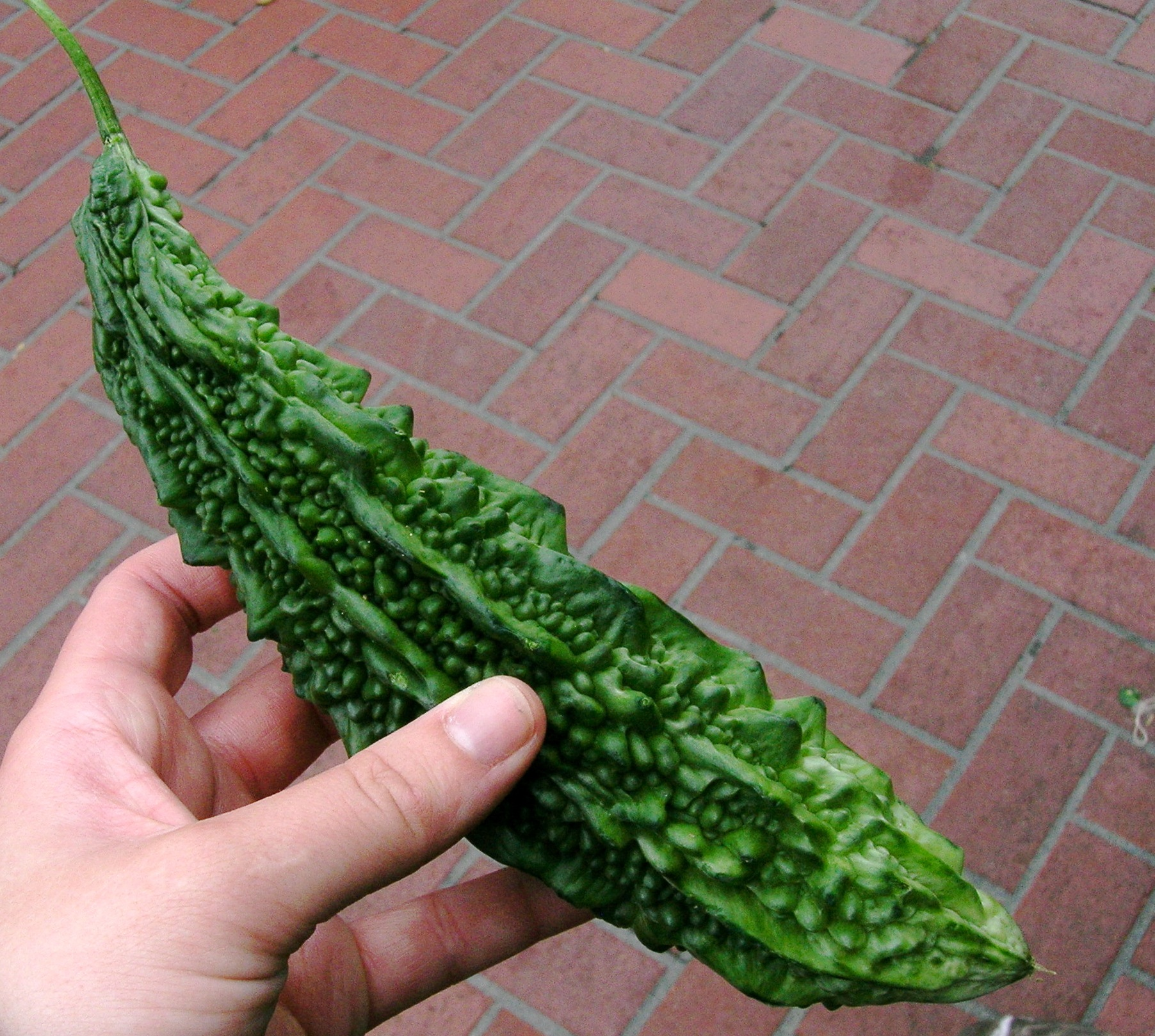
Indian variety

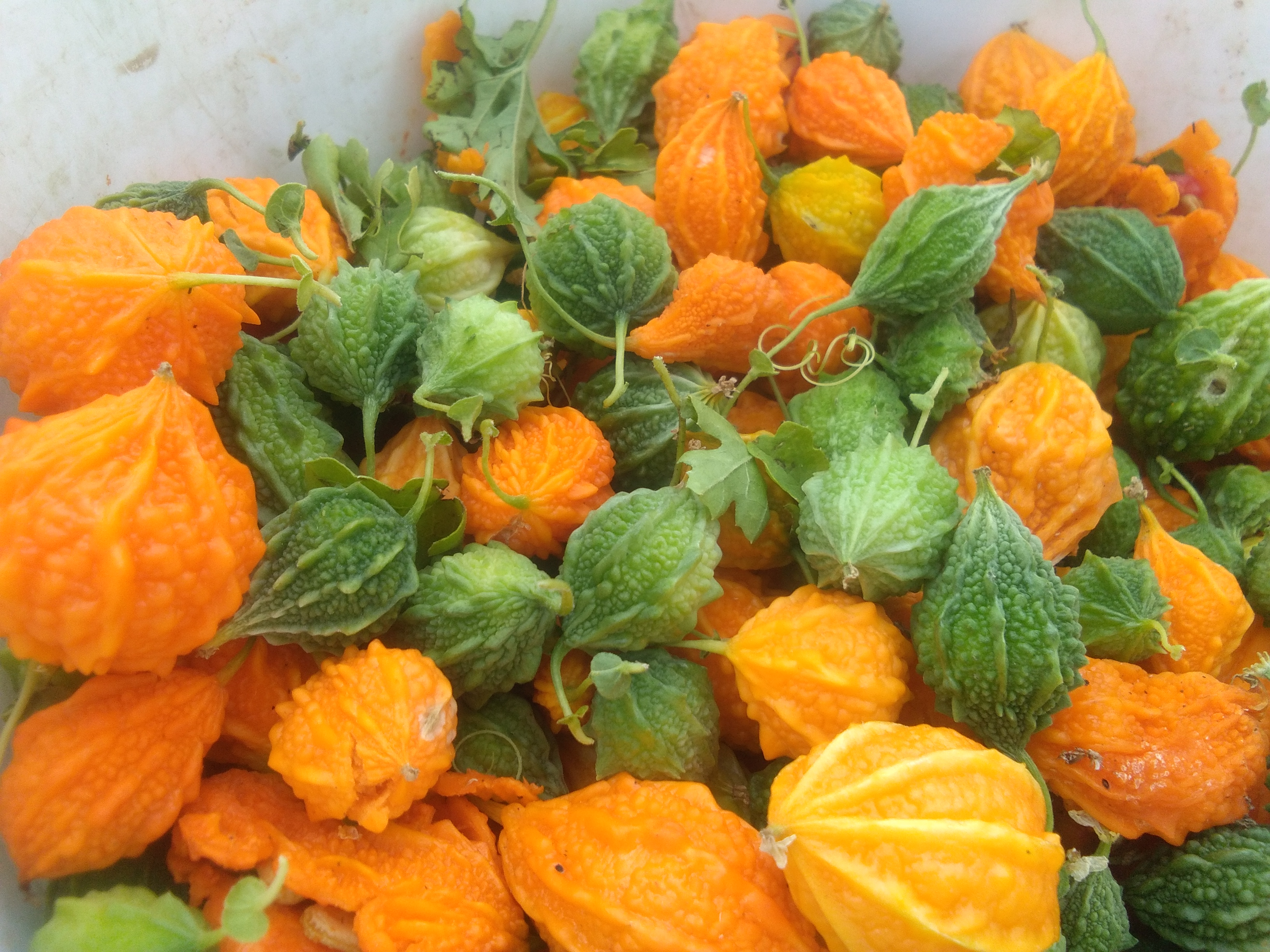
Local variety of bittergourd in Tamilnadu

=== Pests ===
M. charantia is one of the main hosts of Bactrocera tau, a fly known to prefer Cucurbitaceae.

== Adverse effects ==
A possible side effect is gastrointestinal discomfort. The ripe fruit and the mature seeds are toxic.

=== In pregnancy ===
Bitter melon is contraindicated in pregnant women because it can induce bleeding, contractions, and miscarriage.

== Uses ==
=== Cooking ===
Bitter gourd pods boiled, drained, no salt
Nutritional value per 100 g (3.5 oz)
- Energy: 79 kJ (19 kcal)
- Carbohydrates: 4.32 g
- Sugars: 1.95 g
- Dietary fiber: 2 g
- Fat: 0.18 g
- Protein: 0.84 g
Vitamins and minerals
Vitamins	Quantity %DV^{†}
Vitamin A equiv. beta-Carotene lutein zeaxanthin	1% 6 μg 1% 68 μg 1323 μg
Thiamine (B1)	4% 0.051 mg
Riboflavin (B2)	4% 0.053 mg
Niacin (B3)	2% 0.28 mg
Pantothenic acid (B5)	4% 0.193 mg
Vitamin B6	2% 0.041 mg
Folate (B9)	13% 51 μg
Vitamin C	37% 33 mg
Vitamin E	1% 0.14 mg
Vitamin K	4% 4.8 μg
Minerals	Quantity %DV^{†}
Calcium	1% 9 mg
Iron	2% 0.38 mg
Magnesium	4% 16 mg
Manganese	4% 0.086 mg
Phosphorus	3% 36 mg
Potassium	11% 319 mg
Sodium	0% 6 mg
Zinc	7% 0.77 mg
- Other constituents: Quantity
- Water: 93.95 g
- Link to USDA Database entry
- ^{†}Percentages estimated using US recommendations for adults, except for potassium, which is estimated based on expert recommendation from the National Academies.

Bitter melon is generally consumed cooked in the green or early yellowing stage. The young shoots and leaves of the bitter melon may also be eaten as greens. The raw fruit is bitter and can be soaked in cold water and drained to remove some of those strong flavours.

==== China ====
In Chinese cuisine, bitter melon (苦瓜, pinyin: kǔguā; Pe̍h-ōe-jī: khó͘-koe) is used in stir-fries (often with pork and douchi), soups, dim sum, and herbal teas (gohyah tea). It has also been used in place of hops as the bittering ingredient in some beers in China and Okinawa.

==== India ====
Bitter gourd is commonly eaten throughout India. In North Indian cuisine, it is often served with yogurt on the side to offset the bitterness, used in curry such as sabzi, or stuffed with spices and then cooked in oil.

In South Indian cuisine, it is used in numerous dishes such as thoran / thuvaran (mixed with grated coconut), pavaikka mezhukkupuratti (stir-fried with spices), theeyal (cooked with roasted coconut), and pachadi (which is considered a medicinal food for diabetics), making it vital in Malayali's diet. Other popular recipes include preparations with curry, deep-frying with peanuts or other ground nuts, and Kakara kaya pulusu (కాకర కాయ పులుసు) in Telugu, a tamarind-based soup with mini shallots or fried onions and other spices, thickened with chickpea flour. In Karnataka, bitter melon is known as hāgalakāyi (ಹಾಗಲಕಾಯಿ) in Kannada; in Tamil Nadu it is known as paagarkaai or pavakai (பாகற்காய்) in Tamil. In these regions, a special preparation called pagarkai pitla, a kind of sour koottu, is common. Also commonly seen is kattu pagarkkai, a curry in which bitter melons are stuffed with onions, cooked lentils, and grated coconut mix, then tied with thread and fried in oil. In the Konkan region of Maharashtra, salt is added to the finely chopped bitter gourd, known as karle (कारले) in Marathi, and then it is squeezed, removing its bitter juice to some extent. After frying this with different spices, the less bitter and crispy preparation is served with grated coconut. Bitter melon is known as karate (Konkani: कारांतें) in Goa where it is used widely in Goan cuisine. In Bengal, where it is known as korola (করলা) or ucche (উচ্ছে) in Bengali, bitter melon is often simply eaten boiled and mashed with salt, mustard oil, sliced thinly and deep fried, added to lentils to make "tetor" dal (bitter lentils), and is a key ingredient of the Shukto, a Bengali vegetable medley that is a mixture of several vegetables like raw banana, drumstick stems, bori, and sweet potato.

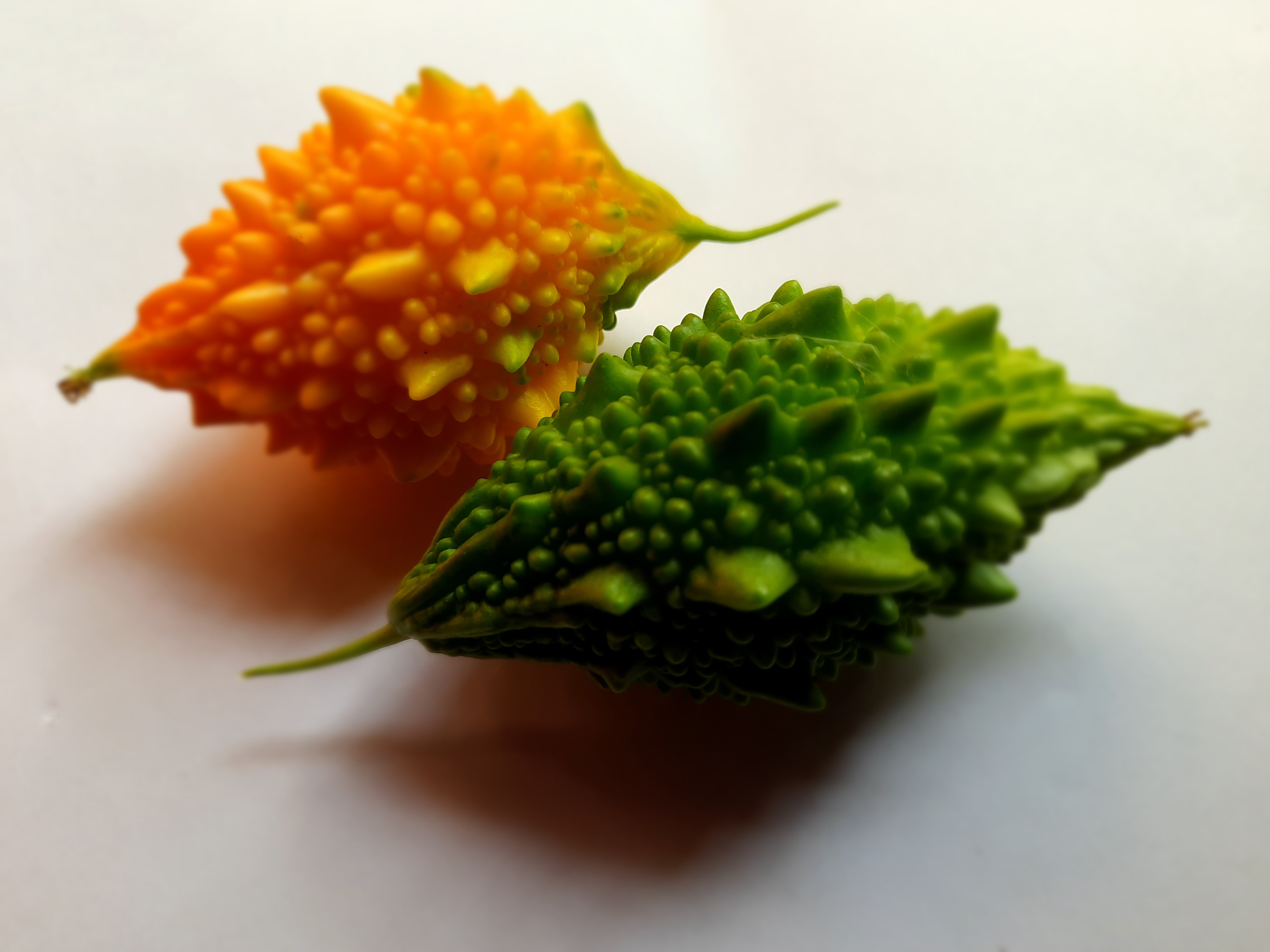
Ripe and unripe fruits

==== Nepal ====
Bitter melon, known as tite karela (तीते करेला) in Nepali, is prepared as a fresh pickle. For this, the vegetable is cut into cubes or slices, and sautéed with oil and a sprinkle of water. When it is softened and reduced, it is crushed in a mortar with a few cloves of garlic, salt, and a red or green pepper. It is also eaten sautéed to golden brown and crispy, stuffed, or as a curry on its own or with potatoes.

==== Myanmar ====
In Burmese cuisine, bitter melon is sauteéd with garlic, tomatoes, spices, and dried shrimp and is served as an accompaniment to other dishes. Such a dish is available at street stalls and deli counters throughout the country.

==== Sri Lanka ====
It is called karavila (Sinhala: කරවිල) in Sri Lanka and it is an ingredient in many different curry dishes (e.g., karawila curry and karawila sambol) which are served mainly with rice in a main meal. Sometimes large grated coconut pieces are added, which is more common in rural areas. Karawila juice is also sometimes served there.

==== Okinawa ====
Bitter melon, known as gōyā (ゴーヤー) in Okinawan, and nigauri (苦瓜) in Japanese (although the Okinawan word gōyā is also used), is a significant ingredient in Okinawan cuisine, and is increasingly used in Japanese cuisine beyond that island.

==== Pakistan ====
In Pakistan, where it is known as karela (کریلا) in Urdu-speaking areas, bitter melon is often cooked with onions, red chili powder, turmeric powder, salt, coriander powder, and a pinch of cumin seeds. Another dish in Pakistan calls for whole, unpeeled bitter melon to be boiled and then stuffed with cooked minced beef, served with either hot tandoori bread, naan, chappati, or with khichri (a mixture of lentils and rice).

==== Indonesia ====
In Indonesian cuisine, bitter melon, known as pare in Javanese and Indonesian (also paria), is prepared in various dishes, such as gado-gado, siomay, and also stir-fried, cooked in coconut milk, or steamed. In Christian areas in Eastern Indonesia it is cooked with pork and chili, the sweetness of the pork balancing against the bitterness of the vegetable.

==== Vietnam ====
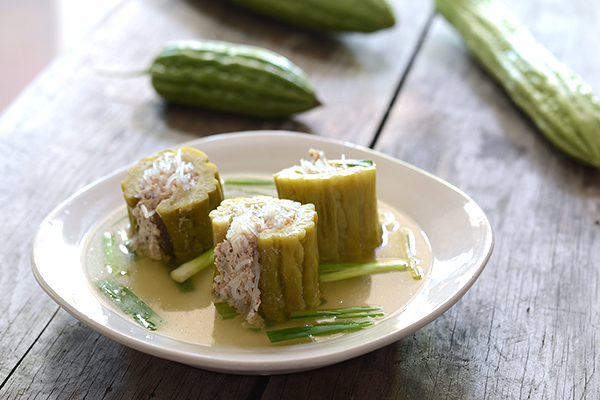
Vietnamese bitter melon soup, with melon sections stuffed with pork

In Vietnamese cuisine, raw bitter melon slices known as mướp đắng or khổ qua in Vietnamese, eaten with dried meat floss and bitter melon soup with shrimp, are common dishes. Bitter melons stuffed with ground pork are commonly served as a summer soup in the south. It is also used as the main ingredient of stewed bitter melon. This dish is usually cooked for the Tết holiday, where its "bitter" name is taken as a reminder of the bitter living conditions experienced in the past.

==== Thailand ====
In Thai cuisine, the Chinese variety of green bitter melon, mara (มะระ) in Thai, is prepared stuffed with minced pork and garlic, in a clear broth. It is also served sliced and stir-fried with garlic and fish sauce until just tender. Varieties found in Thailand range from large fruit to small fruit. The smallest fruit variety (mara khii nok) is generally not cultivated but is occasionally found in the wild.

==== Philippines ====
In the cuisine of the Philippines, bitter melon, known as Ampalaya in Filipino and Paria in Ilokano, may be stir-fried with ground beef and oyster sauce, or with eggs and diced tomato. The dish pinakbet, popular in the Ilocos region of Luzon, consists mainly of bitter melons, eggplant, okra, string beans, tomatoes, lima beans, and other various regional vegetables all stewed together with a little bagoong-based stock.

The name of the fruit is rooted in the bitterness of its taste, (Filipino: Ampait) which means bitter. In pre-colonial Spanish in Ilocandia, the name is locally translated to Amparia and Ampalaya in the Filipino language.

==== Trinidad and Tobago ====
In Trinidad and Tobago, bitter melons, known as caraille or carilley, are usually sautéed with onion, garlic, and scotch bonnet pepper until almost crisp.

==== Mauritius ====
In Mauritius, bitter melons are known as margose or margoze.

=== Folk medicine ===
Bitter melon has been used in Asian, African, and Caribbean folk medicine .

== Research ==
Momordica charantia does not significantly decrease fasting blood glucose levels or A1c, indicators of blood glucose control, when taken in capsule or tablet form.

== Subspecies ==
The plant has one subspecies and four varieties:

- Momordica charantia var. abbreviata
- Momordica charantia var. charantia
- Momordica charantia ssp. macroloba
- Momordica charantia L. var. muricata
- Momordica charantia var. pavel

M. charantia var. charantia and pavel are the long-fruited varieties, whereas M. charantia var. muricata, macroloba and abbreviata feature smaller fruits.

== Gallery ==
=== Plant ===
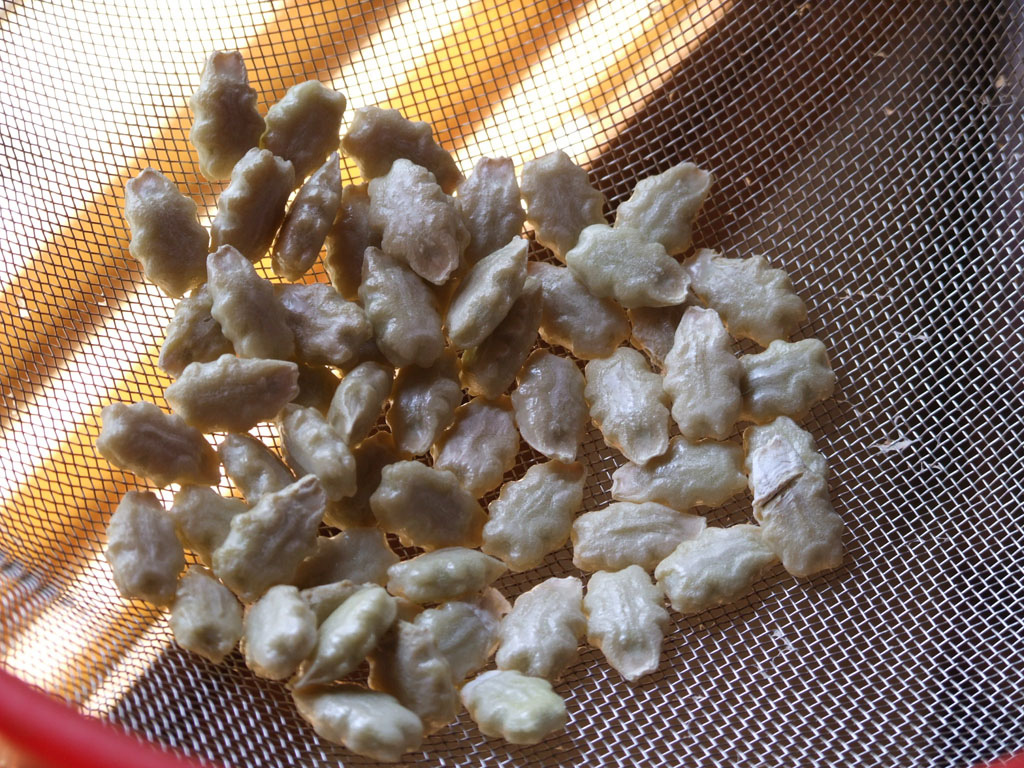
Seeds

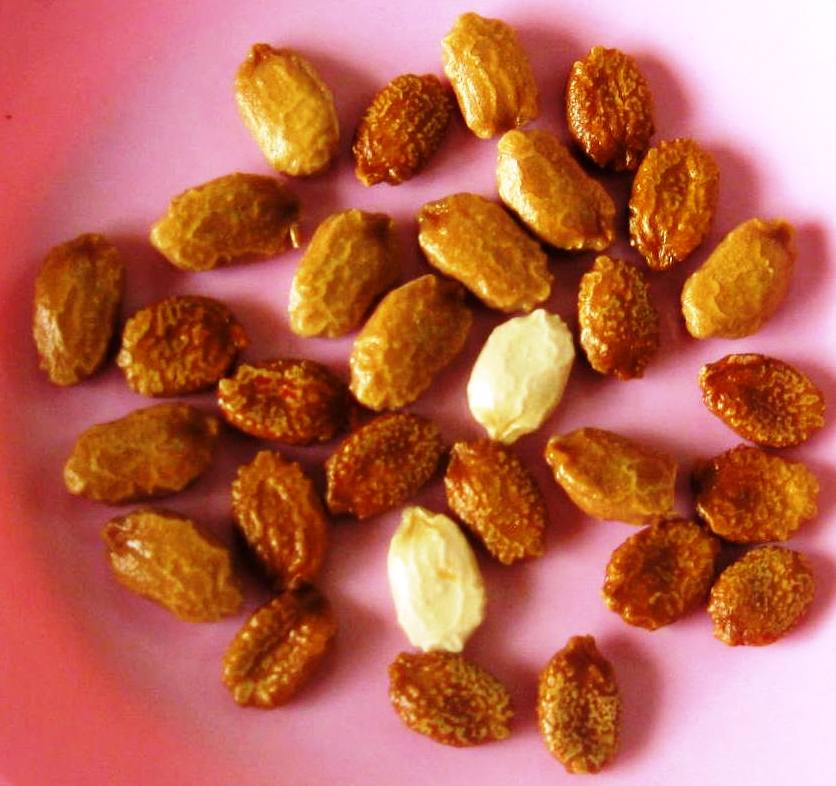
Seeds

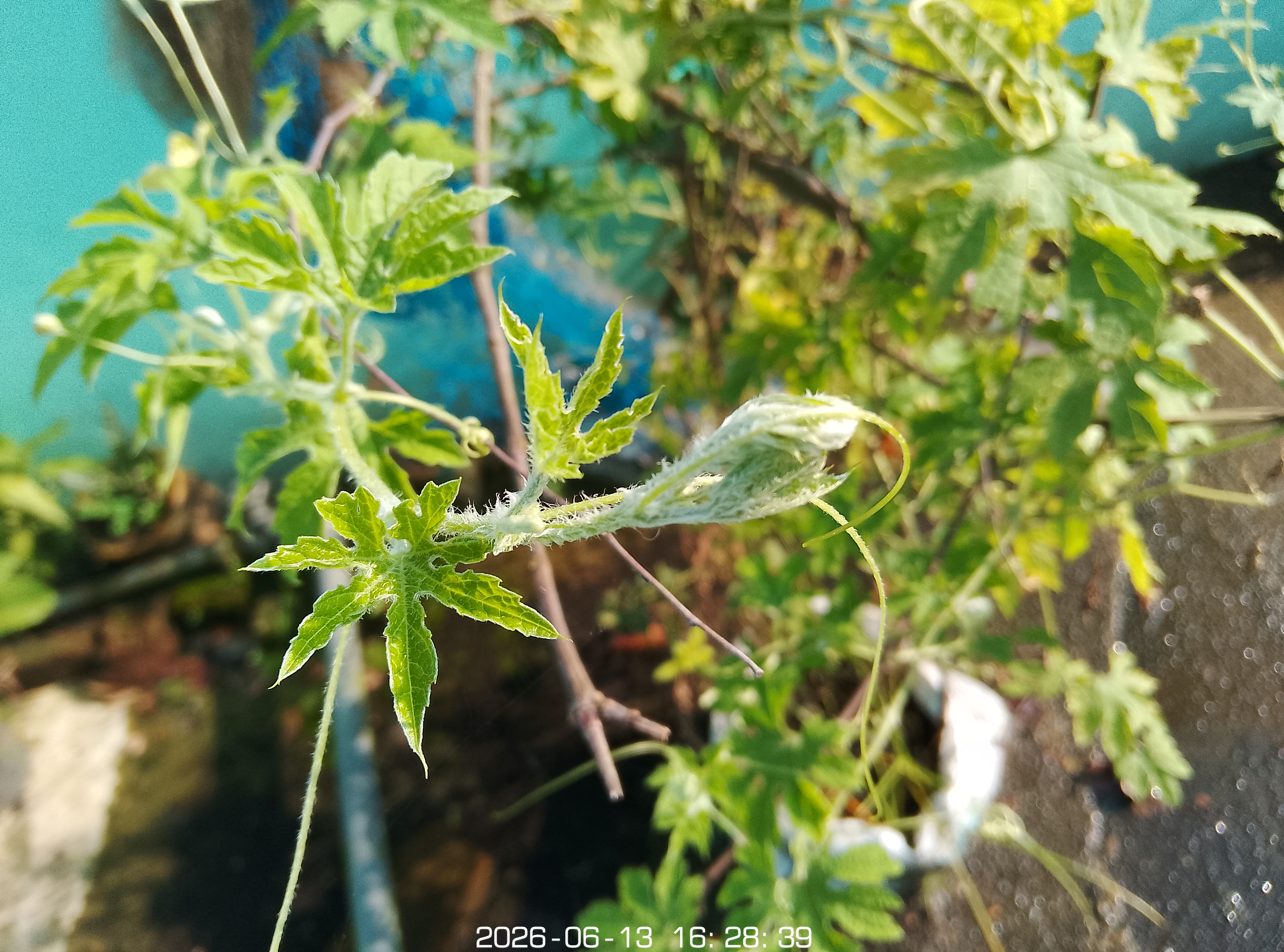
Flower of Bitter melon

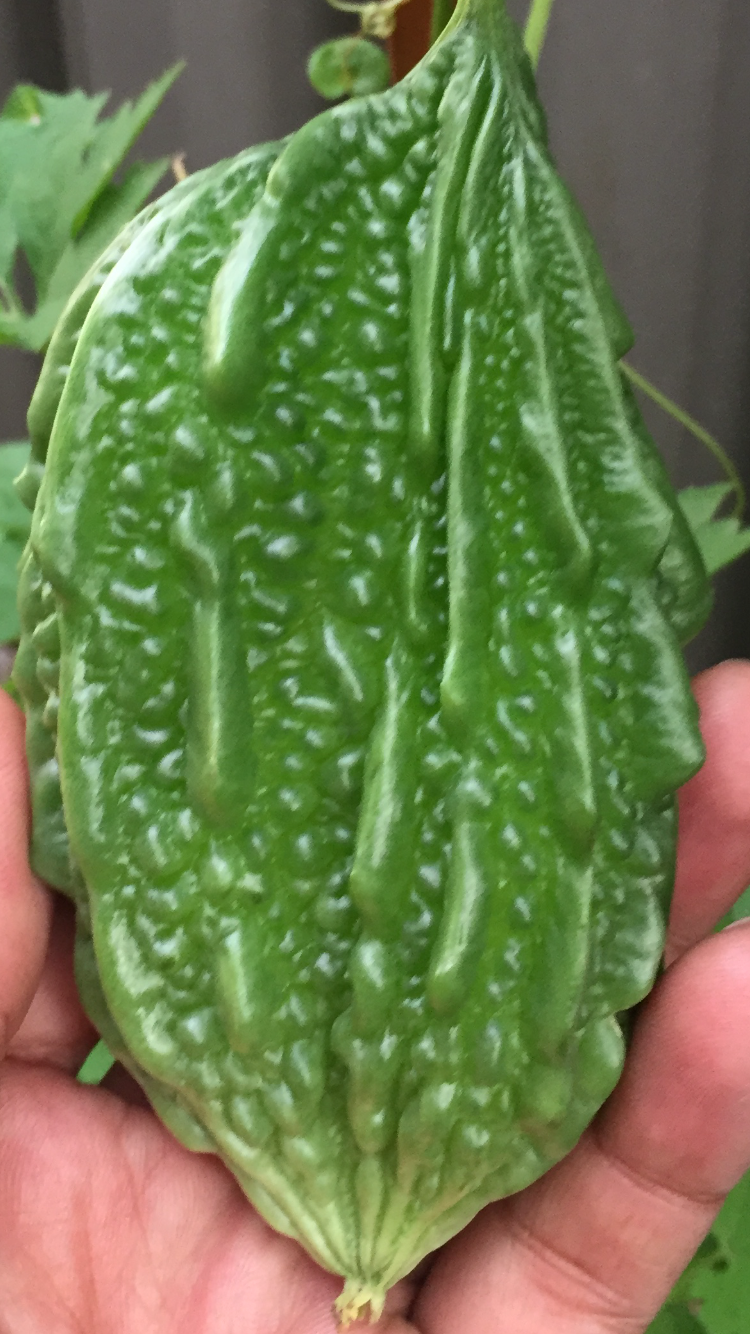
Unusual conjoined twin fruit

=== Dishes and other uses ===
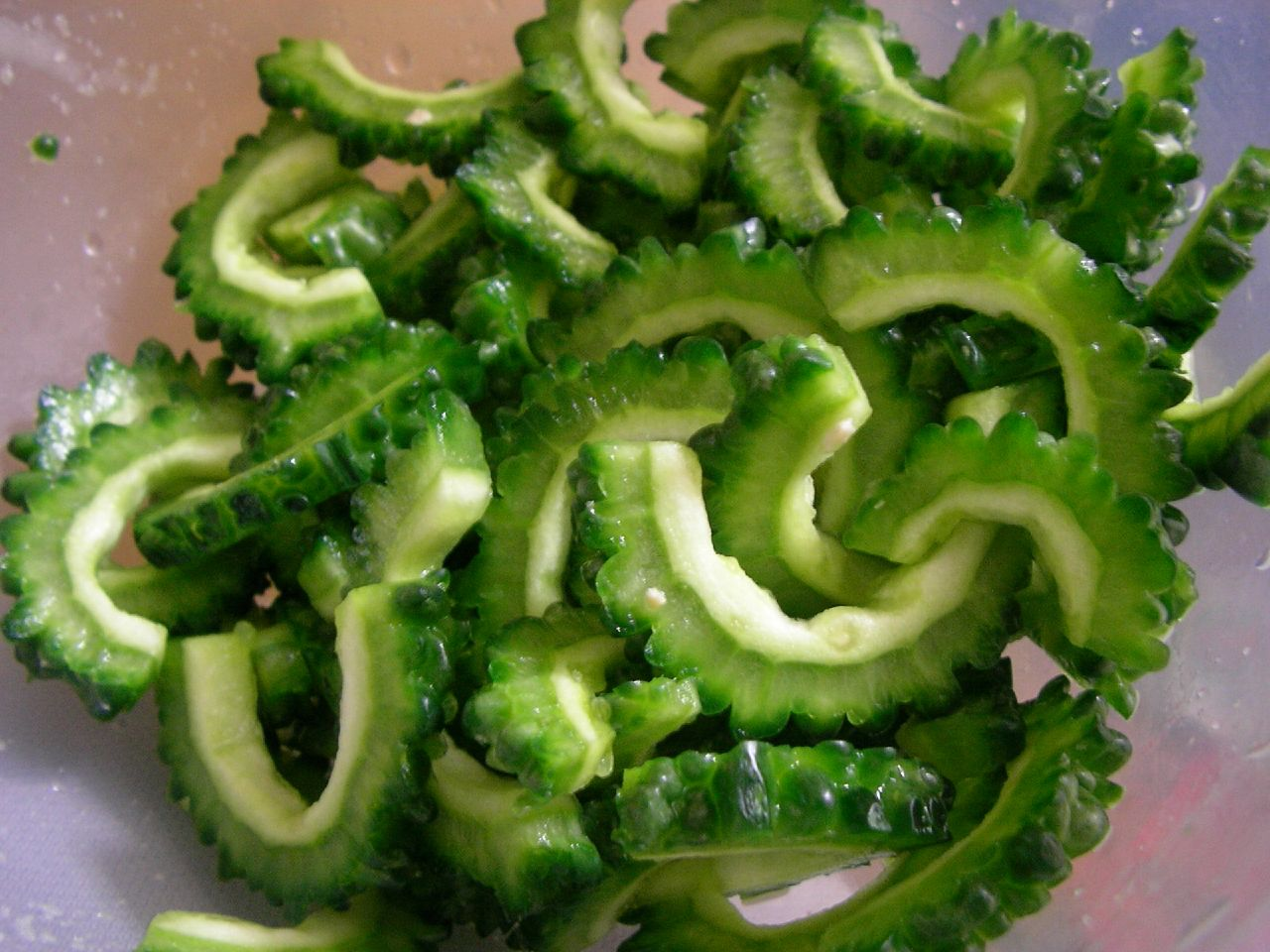
Ready to be cooked

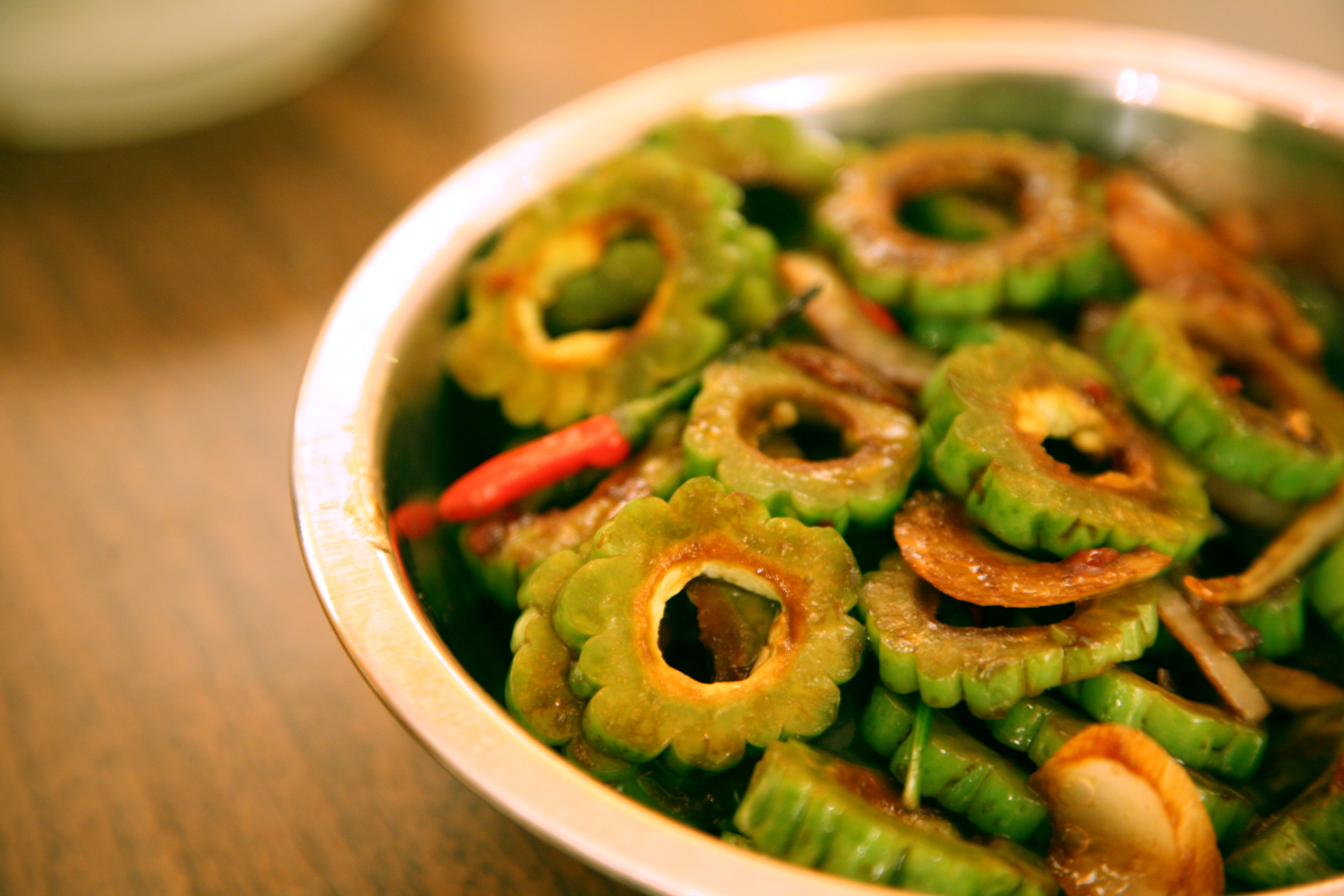
Malaysian-style, cooked with sambal, onion, and red bird's-eye chili peppers

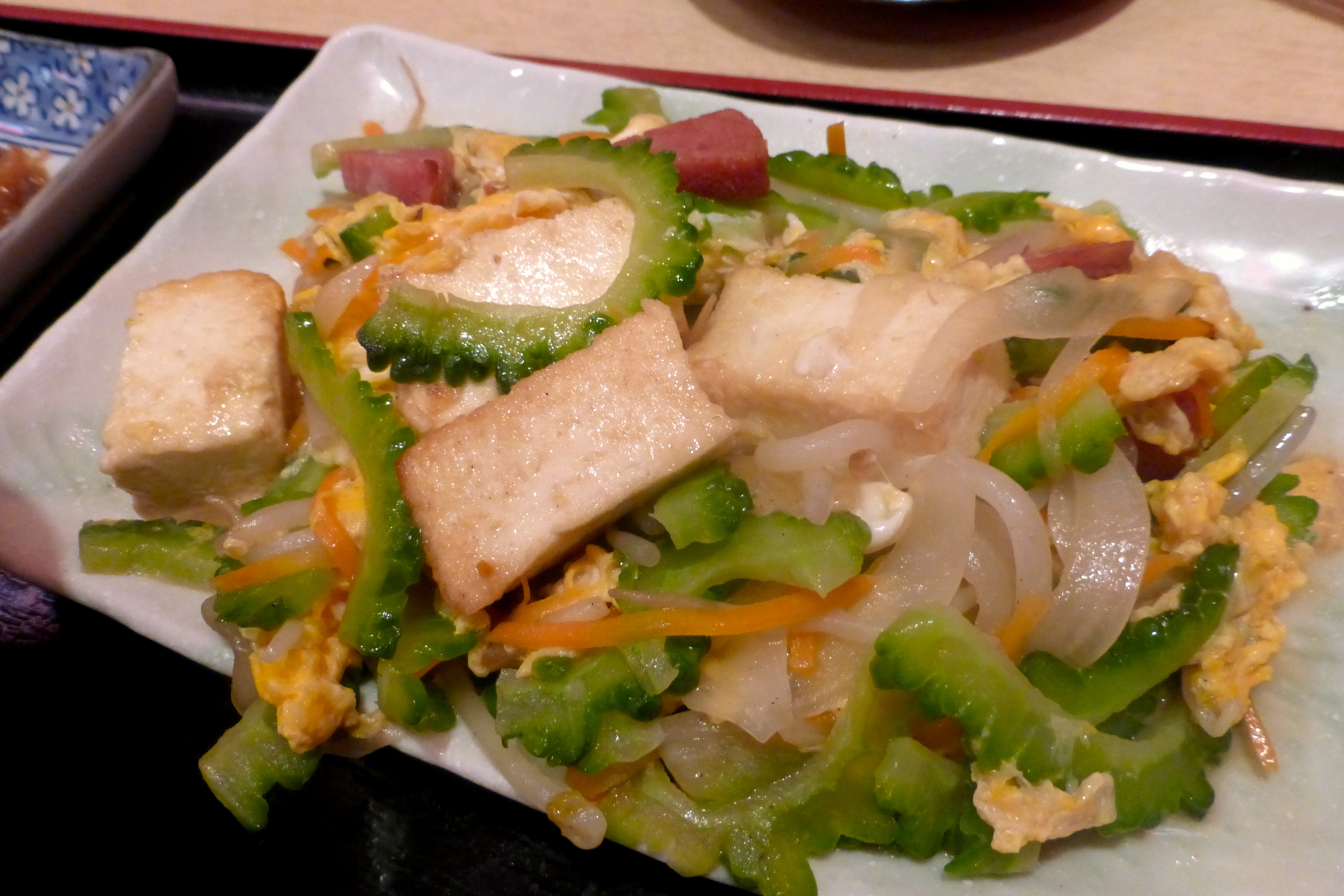
Gōyā chanpurū

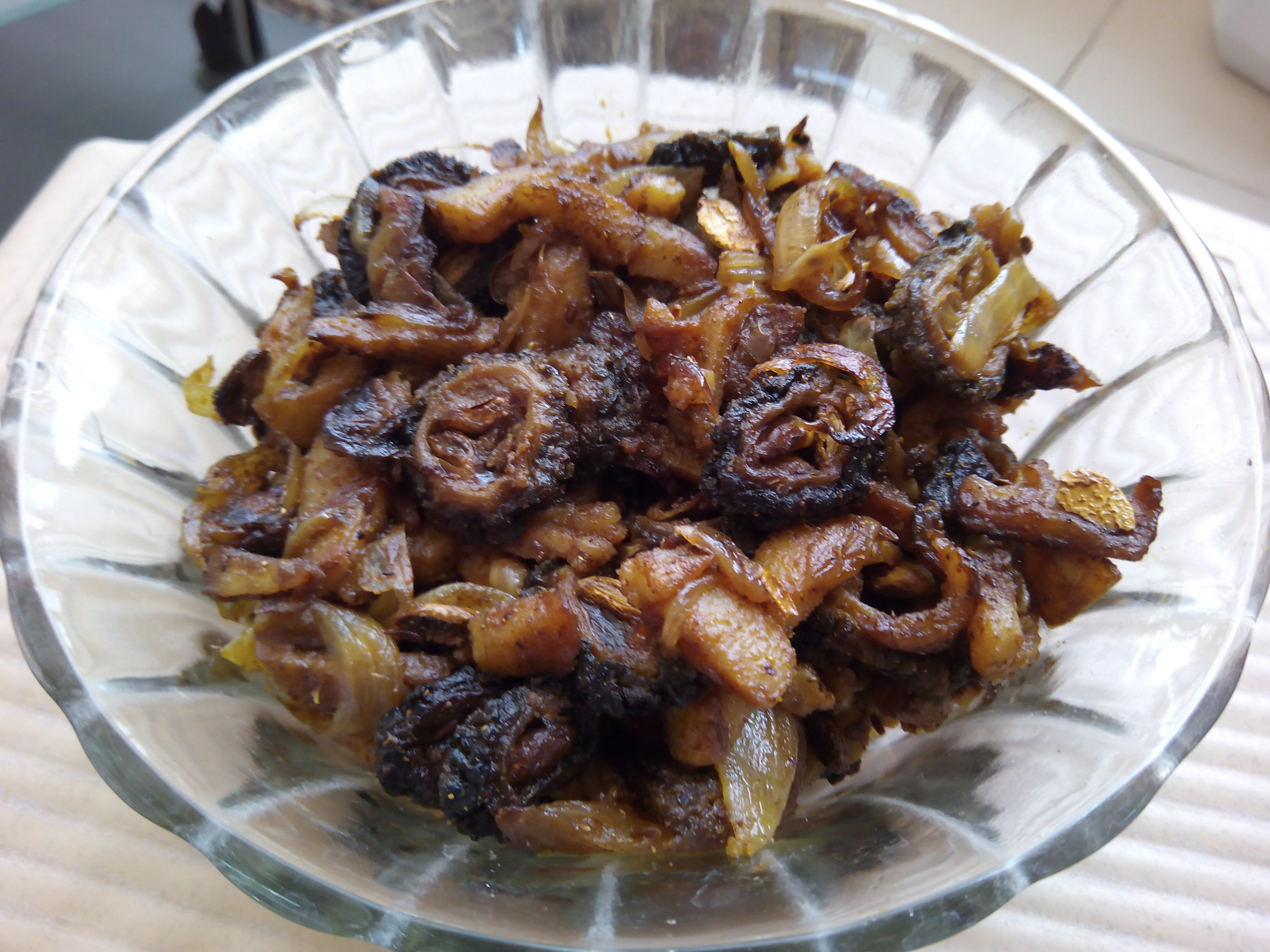
Sabzi (mixed vegetables and spices) from North India

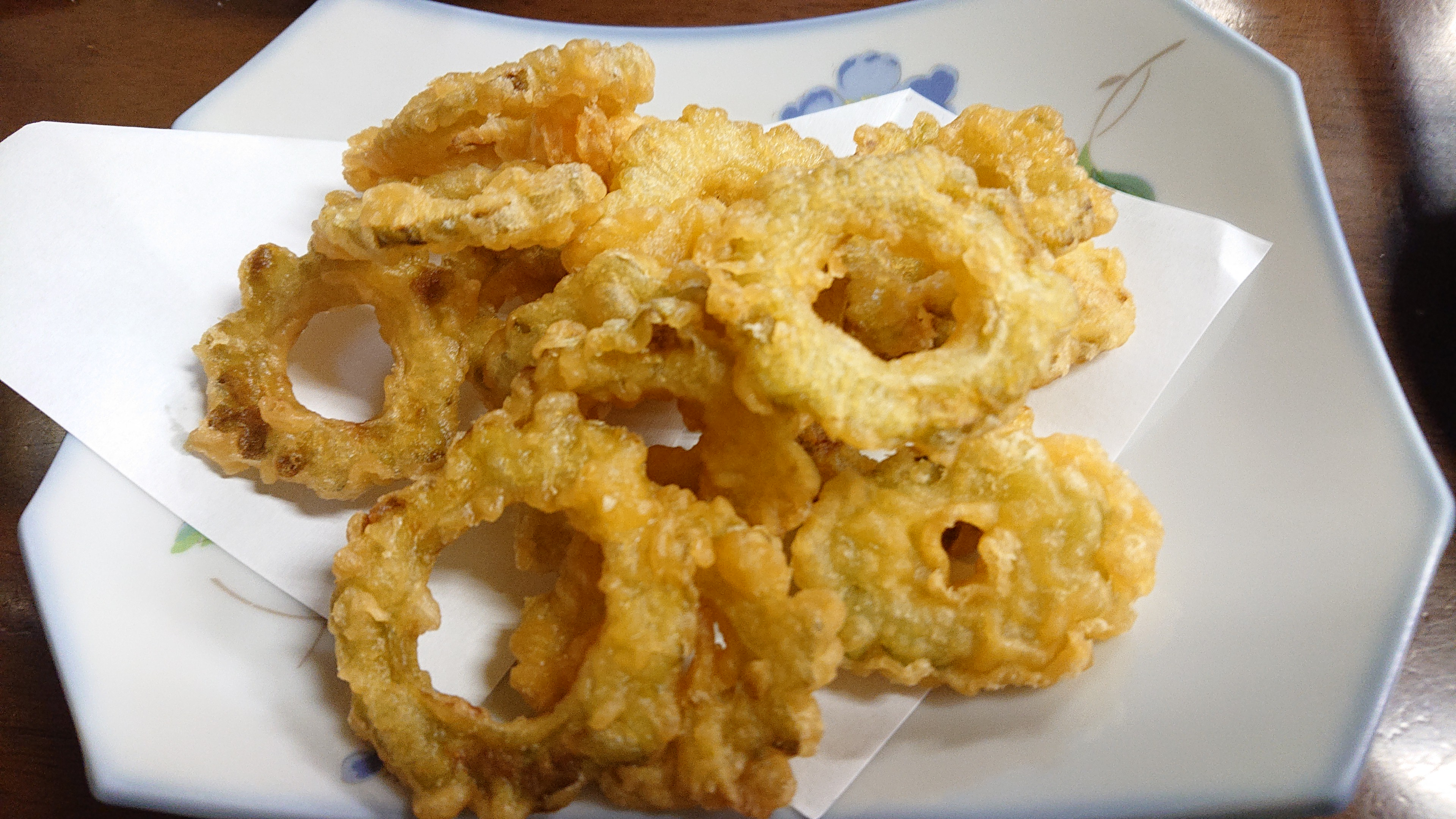
Bitter melon tempura

== See also ==
- Momordica balsamina (balsam apple)
- Momordica cochinchinensis (gac)
- Momordica cymbalaria
- Momordica foetida
