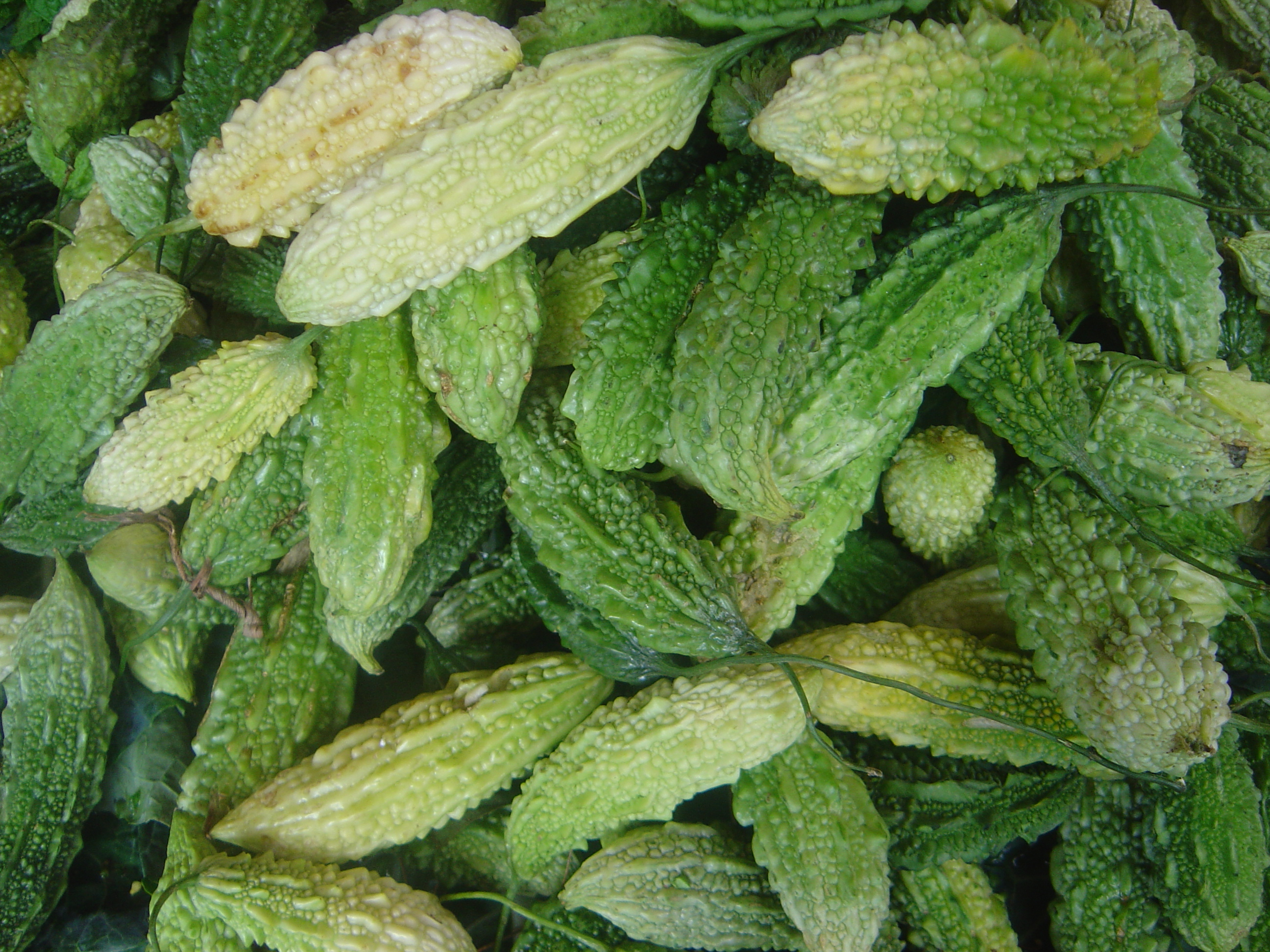
- Bitter melon (Momordica charantia)

Scientific classification
- Kingdom: Plantae
- Clade: Embryophytes
- Clade: Tracheophytes
- Clade: Angiosperms
- Clade: Eudicots
- Clade: Rosids
- Order: Cucurbitales
- Family: Cucurbitaceae
- Subfamily: Cucurbitoideae
- Tribe: Momordiceae; H. Schaef. & S.S. Renner 2011
- Genus: Momordica; L.

Species
- See text

Synonyms
- Calpidosicyos Harms; Dimorphochlamys Hook.f.; Dimorphoclamys Hook.f.; Eulenburgia Pax; Muricia Lour.; Neurosperma Raf.; Neurospermum Bartl., orth. var.; Nevrosperma Raf., orth. var.; Raphanistrocarpus (Baill.) Pax; Raphanocarpus Hook.f.; Zucca Comm. ex Juss.

= Momordica =

Genus of flowering plants

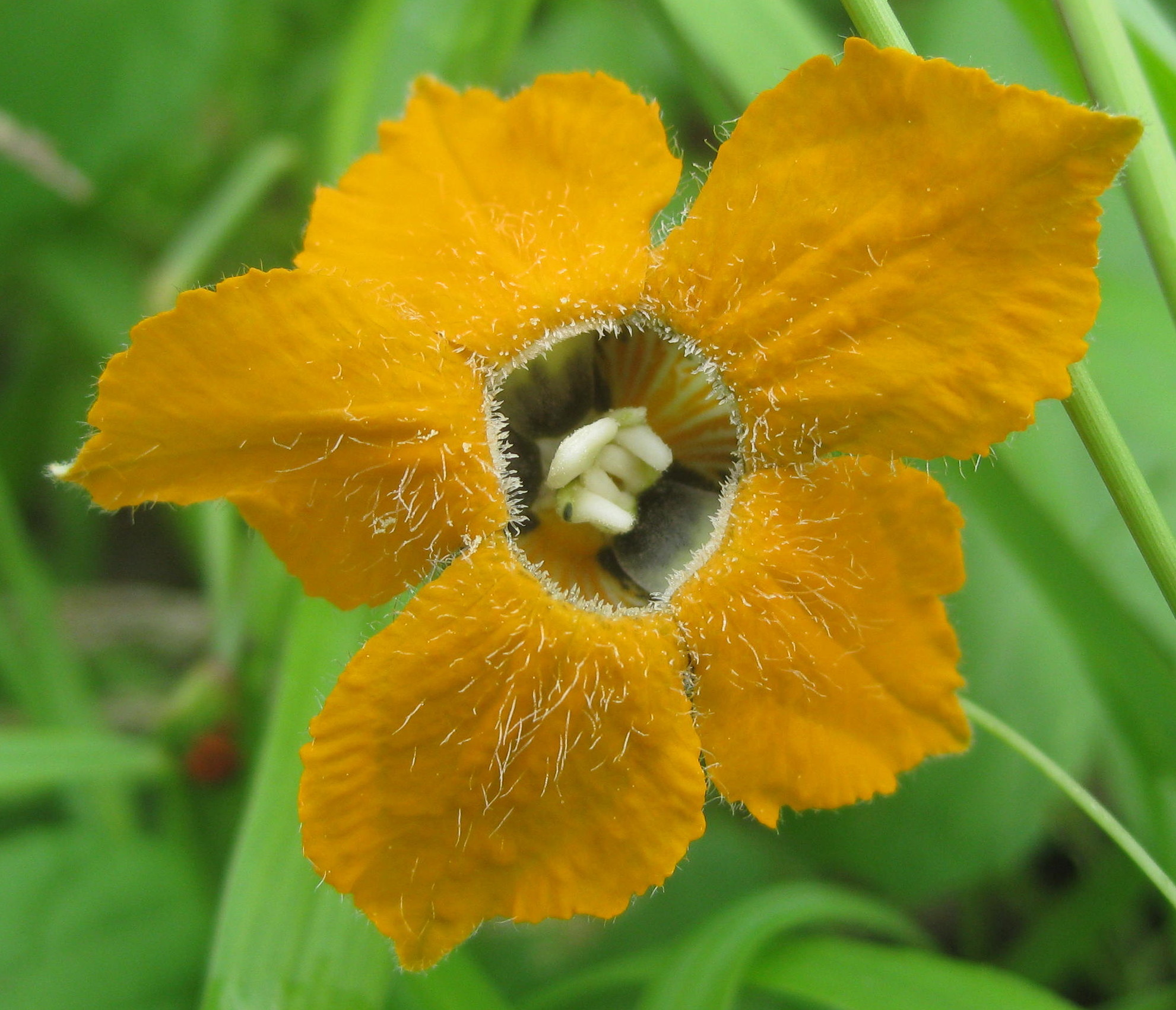
Momordica boivinii flower

Momordica is a genus of about 60 species of annual or perennial climbers herbaceous or rarely small shrubs belonging to the family Cucurbitaceae, native of tropical and subtropical Africa and Asia and Australia. Most species produce floral oils and are visited by specialist pollinators in the apid tribe Ctenoplectrini. A molecular phylogeny that includes all species is available (Schaefer and Renner, 2010).

== Cultivation and uses ==
Some Momordica species are grown in cultivation for their fleshy fruit, which are oblong to cylindrical in shape, orange to red in colour, prickly or warted externally, and in some species burst when ripe, generally with elastic force, into irregular valves.

Momordica can be cultivated in 5 litre vases or jardinière and is hardly susceptible to plagues. After seeding, Momordica develops leaves in about 11 days and flowers after 40 to 50 days. After fertilisation, the Momordica fruit will be developed in about 10 days.

A species of wild bitter melon is used in Ayurveda the ancient medicine system of India to treat diabetes. The green leaf juice in water is consumed daily. This wild melon is relatively small in size compared to cultivated bitter melon.

Momordica charantia (bitter melon, Mandarin Chinese: kǔ guā 苦瓜) is native to Africa but has been used in Chinese folk medicine for centuries as a 'bitter, cold' herb, and has recently been brought into mainstream Chinese medicine as well as natural medical traditions around the world. Recent research has shown that the immature fruit might have some antibiotic, anticancer, and antiviral properties, particularly well suited for use in treatment of malaria, HIV, and diabetic conditions. The use of Momordica fruit is contraindicated in a number of conditions, especially pregnancy.

The effect of Momordica charantia on glucose and insulin concentrations was studied in nine non-insulin-dependent diabetics and six non-diabetic rats. These results show that it might improve glucose tolerance in diabetes but much more research is needed. Doctors supervising Asian diabetics should be aware of the fruit's hypoglycemic properties.

== Accepted species ==
Momordica angolensis R.Fernandes
Momordica angustisepala Harms
Momordica anigosantha
Hook.f.
Momordica balsamina L.
Momordica boivinii Baill.
Momordica cabrae (Cogn.) C.Jeffrey
Momordica calantha Gilg
Momordica camerounensis Keraudren
Momordica charantia L. - Bitter melon
Momordica cissoides Planch. ex Benth.
Momordica clarkeana King
Momordica cochinchinensis (Lour.) Spreng. - Gac
Momordica corymbifera Hook.f.
Momordica cymbalaria Hook.f.
Momordica denticulata Miq.
Momordica denudata C.B.Clarke
Momordica dioica Roxb. ex Willd.
Momordica enneaphylla Cogn.
Momordica foetida Schumach.
Momordica glabra Zimmerman
Momordica henriquesii Cogn.
Momordica involucrata E.Mey.
Momordica jeffreyana Keraudren

Momordica laotica Gagnep.
Momordica leiocarpa Gilg
Momordica littorea Thulin
Momordica macrophylla Gage
Momordica mannii Hook.f.
Momordica mossambica H.Schaef.
Momordica multiflora Hook.f.
Momordica obtusisepala Keraudren
Momordica parvifolia Cogn.
Momordica peteri A.Zimm.
Momordica pterocarpa Hochst.
Momordica repens Bremek.
Momordica rostrata A.Zimm.
Momordica sessilifolia Cogn.
Momordica silvatica Jongkind.
Momordica spinosa Chiov.
Momordica suringarii Cogn.
Momordica trifoliolata Hook.f.
Momordica welwitschii Hook.f.

List sources
