= Momordica enneaphylla =

Conservation status
- Vulnerable (IUCN 3.1)

Scientific classification
- Kingdom: Plantae
- Clade: Tracheophytes
- Clade: Angiosperms
- Clade: Eudicots
- Clade: Rosids
- Order: Cucurbitales
- Family: Cucurbitaceae
- Genus: Momordica
- Species: M. enneaphylla

Binomial name
- Momordica enneaphylla Cogn.

Synonyms
- Momordica diplotrimera Harms

Species of flowering plant

Momordica enneaphylla is a species of plant in the family Cucurbitaceae. It is found in Cameroon, the Democratic Republic of the Congo, and Gabon. Its natural habitats are subtropical or tropical moist lowland forests and subtropical or tropical swamps. It is threatened by habitat loss.
