= Theeyal =

South Indian roasted coconut stew

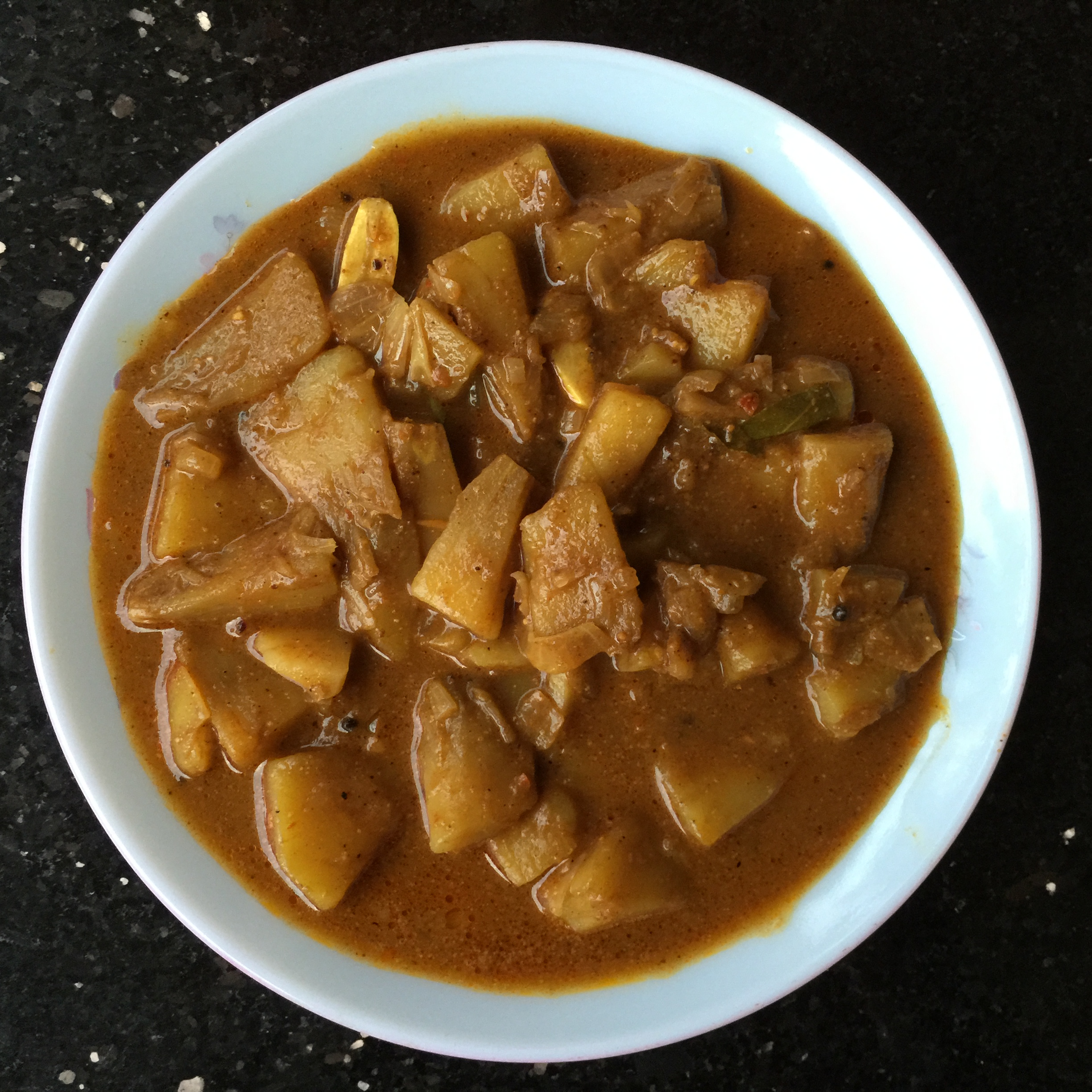
- Type: Soup
- Place of origin: India
- Region or state: Kerala
- Main ingredients: Roasted coconut, coriander seeds, dried red chili, fenugreek, tamarind, water, vegetables

Theeyal (pronounced [t̪iːjal]) is a South Indian dish originating from the Indian state of Kerala. It has a soupy consistency, and is made from a mixture of spices consisting of roasted coconut, coriander seeds, dried red chili and fenugreek. All spices are ground to a paste and cooked in tamarind water with vegetables. When completed it looks like a rich medium brown gravy and is normally served with rice.

Theeyal, which means "burnt dish", is a typical Kerala dish featuring roasted coconut and is usually dark brown in color. It gets its color from the toasting of grated coconut and also from tamarind. In some parts of Kerala, theeyal is included in a traditional sadya menu.

The most popular theeyal is prawns. Vegetables used for theeyal include pearl onion or shallot, bitter melon, potato, eggplant, okra, cucumber, and raw mango.
