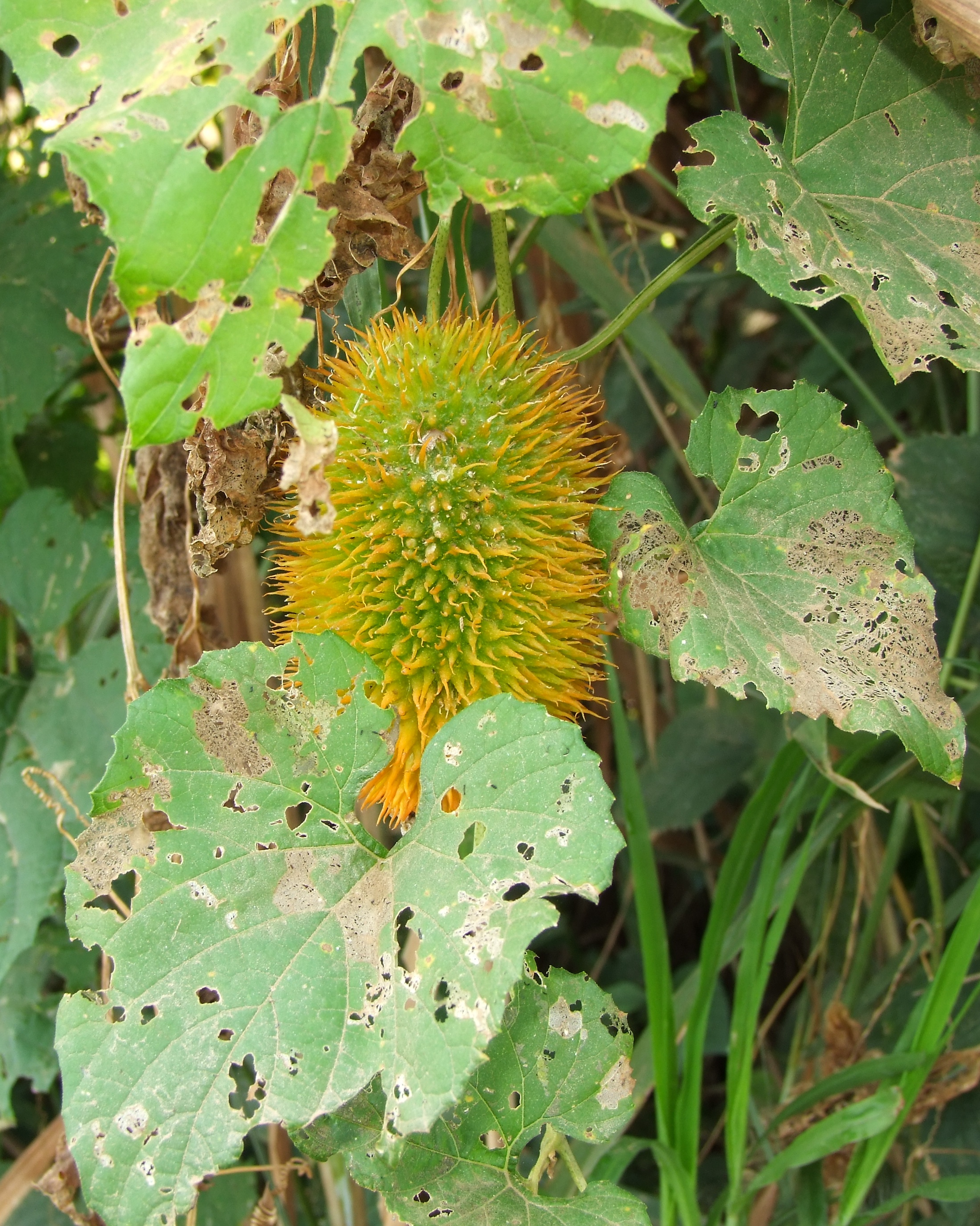

Scientific classification
- Kingdom: Plantae
- Clade: Embryophytes
- Clade: Tracheophytes
- Clade: Spermatophytes
- Clade: Angiosperms
- Clade: Eudicots
- Clade: Rosids
- Order: Cucurbitales
- Family: Cucurbitaceae
- Genus: Momordica
- Species: M. foetida

Binomial name
- Momordica foetida Schumach.

= Momordica foetida =

Species of flowering plant

Momordica foetida is a perennial climbing vine native of tropical Africa, closely related to the bitter melon (M. charantia) and balsam apple (M. balsamina). Its species name ("bad-smelling") refers to its unpleasant smell. It was previously named M. morkorra (A. Rich) and M. cordata (Cogn.)

The plant grows in forest edges and similar habitats (including disturbed and cultivated land), woodland, and wooded grassland. Its leaves are wrinkled, heart-shaped with irregular edges, up to 18 cm wide. The flowers are yellow to yellow-orange. The fruit is a prolate spheroid, 3.5–7.5 cm long and 2.5–5 cm wide, bright orange and covered with soft spines. When fully ripe it splits from the bottom into three valves, exposing a cluster of black seeds, individually covered by a bright red, sticky, sweet pulp. The plant has perennial tuberous roots.

Local names for the plant include concombre sauvage (French for "wild cucumber"), nyanya-nua, sσprσpσ, kakle, awoduan ("snake food"), aoasongo, gaayama, nanïa, n-gessannia, boobo, bobonowron, vovolé, vovoné vono, hepa, ìsúgū, alu-osi, akb’an’udene, ejìnrìn, tsekiri, and a-bos-a-wir.

== Uses ==
=== Food ===
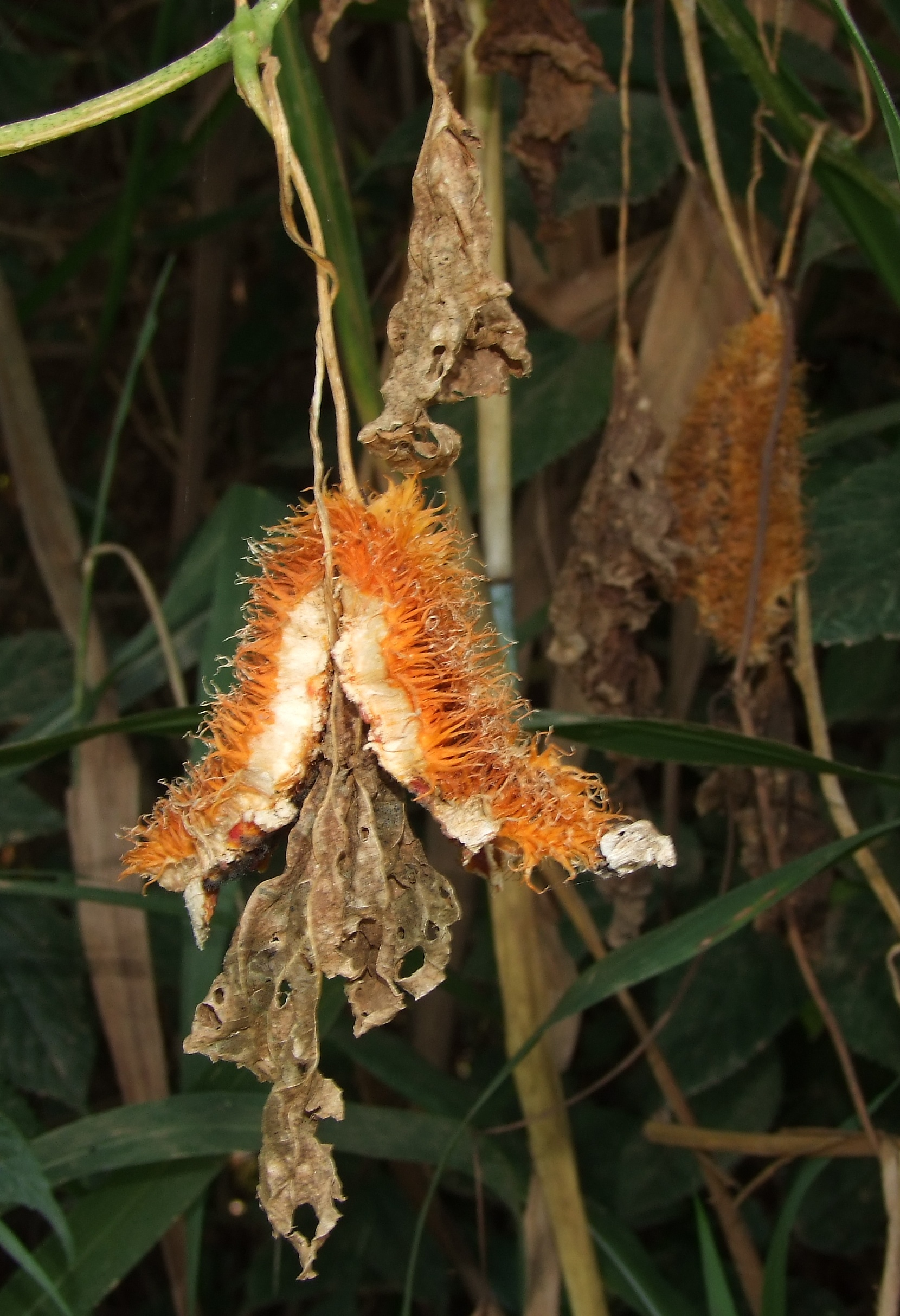
Remains of a ripe fruit, where the pericarp splits into three valves

The leaves have a bitter taste, but are eaten in Gabon and Malawi. The fruit are edible and are consumed in various countries, including Ghana, Gabon, Sudan, and Tanganyika. The root is considered edible in Sudan.

=== Folk medicine ===
Like its relative M. charantia, the plant contains a number of bioactive compounds, including sitosteryl glucoside, 5,25-stigmastadien-3β-yl glucoside, and 1β-hydroxyfriedel-6-en-3-one, and several cucurbitane-type triterpenoid derivatives.

==== Digestive disorders ====
In Tanganika, young leaves are taken for stomachache and the root is considered a purgative. The Edo of Nigeria drink leaf sap for intestinal disorders. The Igbo take it for iba ozi. In Gabon, the leaves are used as emetic and for enemas. The leaf is also as used against roundworm.

==== Pain relief ====
The leaf sap is used to treat severe headache and earache. In Malawi, headache is treated by binding the head with the plant stem.

==== Reproduction ====
In the Ivory Coast a preparation of the leaves is used as an aphrodisiac and is taken by women as an emmenagogue and as childbirth helper. In Uganda, tea from leaves or roots is used as an abortifacient and an ecbolic.

==== Skin conditions ====
In the Ivory Coast, a leaf-decoction is used to treat smallpox. The root is used in Tanganyika to wash small children and mothers' breasts. In South Africa, a root decoction with other plants is taken for boils.

==== Snake bites ====
The inflammation caused by the venom of the spitting cobra, (Naja nigrocollis) can be prevented by promptly rubbing the skin with crushed leaves and chewing them. The leaf sap is drunk to treat snakebite.

==== Other conditions ====
The leaf sap is used to stop nose bleeding. In Tanganyika, the young leaves are used to treat dropsy and malaria.

=== Other uses ===
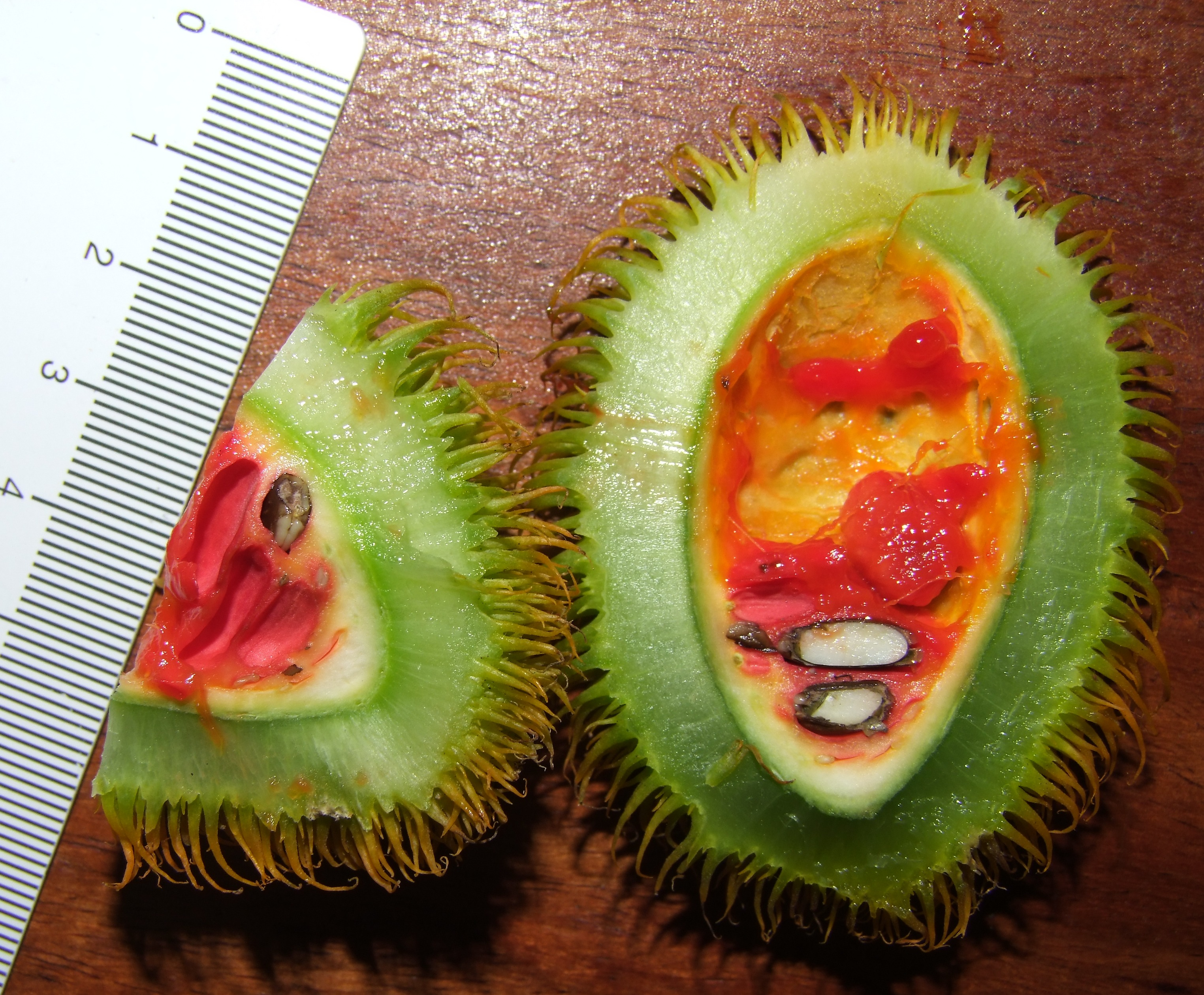
Longitudinal section through unripe fruit

In Malawi, the fruit is used as bait to trap birds. In Gabon, leaves are soaked, dried in the sun, and used to stuff cushions. In Tanganyika, the fruit pulp is believed to be poisonous to weevils, moths, and ants and is used as an insect repellent. The plant's presence is believed to be an indicator that the soil is appropriate for planting cocoa tree.

The closest relatives of Momordica foetida can be seen in a molecular phylogeny that includes all species of Momordica.
