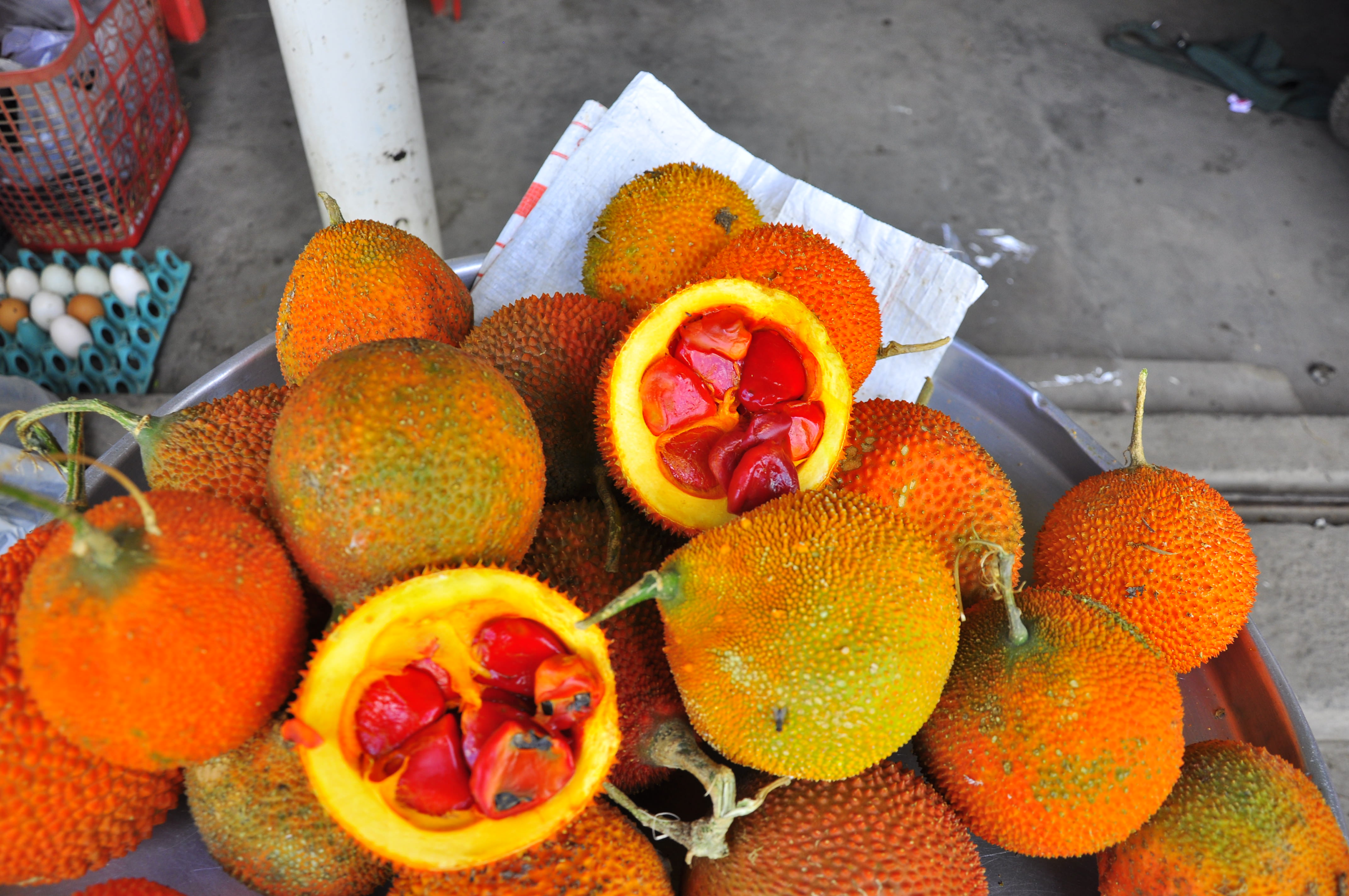
- Exterior and cross-sectional interior of gac

Scientific classification
- Kingdom: Plantae
- Clade: Tracheophytes
- Clade: Angiosperms
- Clade: Eudicots
- Clade: Rosids
- Order: Cucurbitales
- Family: Cucurbitaceae
- Genus: Momordica
- Species: M. cochinchinensis

Binomial name
- Momordica cochinchinensis (Lour.) Spreng.

Synonyms
- Muricia cochinchinensis Lour.; Momordica cochinchinensis subsp. andamanica Kattuk., Y.C.Roy & Krishnaraj; Momordica macrophylla Gage; Momordica meloniflora Hand.-Mazz.; Momordica mixta Roxb.; Momordica ovata Cogn.; Momordica sphaeroidea Blanco; Momordica suringarii Cogn.; Zucca commersoniana Ser.

= Gac =

Species of melon

Gac, from the Vietnamese gấc (pronounced [ɣək˦˥]), scientific name Momordica cochinchinensis, is a species of plant in the melon and cucumber family Cucurbitaceae native to countries throughout Southeast Asia and to Queensland, Australia. It is notable for its vivid orange-reddish color resulting from a mix of beta-carotene and lycopene.

== Description ==
Momordica cochinchinensis is a perennial tendril climber that may reach up to 15 metres (50 feet) long and a stem diameter up to four centimetres (1 1/2 inches). The palmate leaves have 3 to 5 lobes and are carried on a petiole (leaf stem) measuring 6–10 cm (2 1/2–4 in) long. They are arranged alternately on the stems and measure up to 20 cm (8 in) wide and long.

This species is dioecious, meaning that male and female flowers are borne on separate plants. The inflorescence on a male plant consists of either a solitary flower or a raceme up to 10 cm (4 in) long, while female flowers are solitary. All flower buds are fully enclosed by bracts, which split open as the flower matures. The mature flowers have five yellowish petals and a black centre.

The fruit are ovoid to broadly ellipsoid, about 15 cm (6 in) long by 10 cm (4 in) diameter, and are covered with numerous small spines on the skin. They are initially green but turn a deep orange/red at maturity, and they contain numerous irregularly-shaped brown or grey seeds, which are enclosed in a bright red aril.

=== Phenology ===
In the northern hemisphere this species flowers from June to August and fruit appear around August to October. In Australia, flowering occurs from December to January and fruit appear from February to April.

=== Phytochemistry ===
The fruit, seeds, and seed oil contain substantial amounts of beta-carotene and lycopene, which collectively impart the characteristic red-orange color to the fruit's tissues. Both aril and seeds are rich in monounsaturated and polyunsaturated fatty acids, with oil containing 69% unsaturated fats, including 35% as polyunsaturated fats. Gac has a high concentration of linoleic acid (omega-6) and omega-3 fatty acids.

== Taxonomy ==
This species was first described in 1790 by the Portuguese botanist João de Loureiro, who published it in his book Flora cochinchinensis. Loureiro gave this plant the combination Muricia cochinchinensis and noted that it was found in "Cochinchinâ, & Chinâ." In 1826 the German botanist Kurt Polycarp Joachim Sprengel transferred the species to the genus Momordica.

=== Etymology ===
The genus name Momordica is derived from the Latin word mordeo meaning to bite, a reference to the seeds' appearance as though chewed. The species epithet cochinchinensis means "from Cochinchina", the region in the southern part of Vietnam where the plant was first observed by Loureiro.

=== Common names ===
As this plant is native to many countries throughout the Asia-Pacific region, it has a diverse number of common names including: bhat kerala (Assamese), mu bie gua, mu bie zi and teng tong (Chinese), balsam pear, Chinese cucumber, and giant spiny gourd (English), kakur, kantola and kakrol (Hindi), tepurang (Indonesian), mokube tsushi (Japanese), makkao (Khmer), khaawz (Laotian), pupia, teruah and torobuk (Malay), jhuse karelaa (Nepalese), pakurebu (Sulawesi), buyok buyok (Tagalog), phak khao (Thai), and gac (Vietnamese).

== Cultivation ==
As gac plant is dioecious, both male and female plants are needed; hence, farmers must have at least one corresponding male plant growing in or around the gardens for the fruit-bearing female plants to be pollinated. When grown from seed, the ratio of male to female plants is unpredictable.

Pollination may be facilitated by insects, but hand pollination allows for better fruit yield. An alternative method is to graft female material onto the main shoot of a male plant.

For maximum insect-aided pollination, the recommended ratio is about 1 male for every 10 female plants. If propagating from vines, farmers make diagonal cut (around 15–20 cm or 6–8 in long and 3–6 mm or 1/8–1/4 in wide), then root the tubers in water or well-aerated, moist potting media before planting.

Apart from Southeast Asian countries where the fruits are native, gac can be grown in sub-tropical climate regions. Cool temperatures inhibit growth.

== Uses ==
Gac has been commonly used in its native countries, mainly as food and traditional medicine. Its use as a folk medicine dates back over centuries in China and Vietnam. Gac seeds, known as mù biē zǐ (meaning 'wooden turtle seed'), are used for a variety of internal and topical purposes in traditional medicine.

The aril surrounding gac seeds when the fruits are ripe is cooked with sticky rice to make xôi gac, a traditional Vietnamese dish with a striking red color that is served during Tết (Lunar New Year), as well as other special occasions. In Sri Lanka, gac is used in curry, and in Thailand, it is served with ice cream. Additionally, the unripe green fruit is eaten in some parts of India and the Philippines. The spiny skin is removed and the fruits are sliced and cooked sometimes with potato or bottle gourd. In the Philippines, it is particularly common in the far northern province of Ilocos Norte, where it is called by several names: sugod-sugod, parog-parog, and libas. There, the unripe fruits are commonly added as a vegetable in dinengdeng, pinakbet, and, alongside its young shoots blanched, ginisa.

Due to the high contents of beta-carotene and lycopene, extracts from the fruit's arils are used to manufacture dietary supplements or are sometimes mixed into food and drink as a food dye.

== Gallery ==
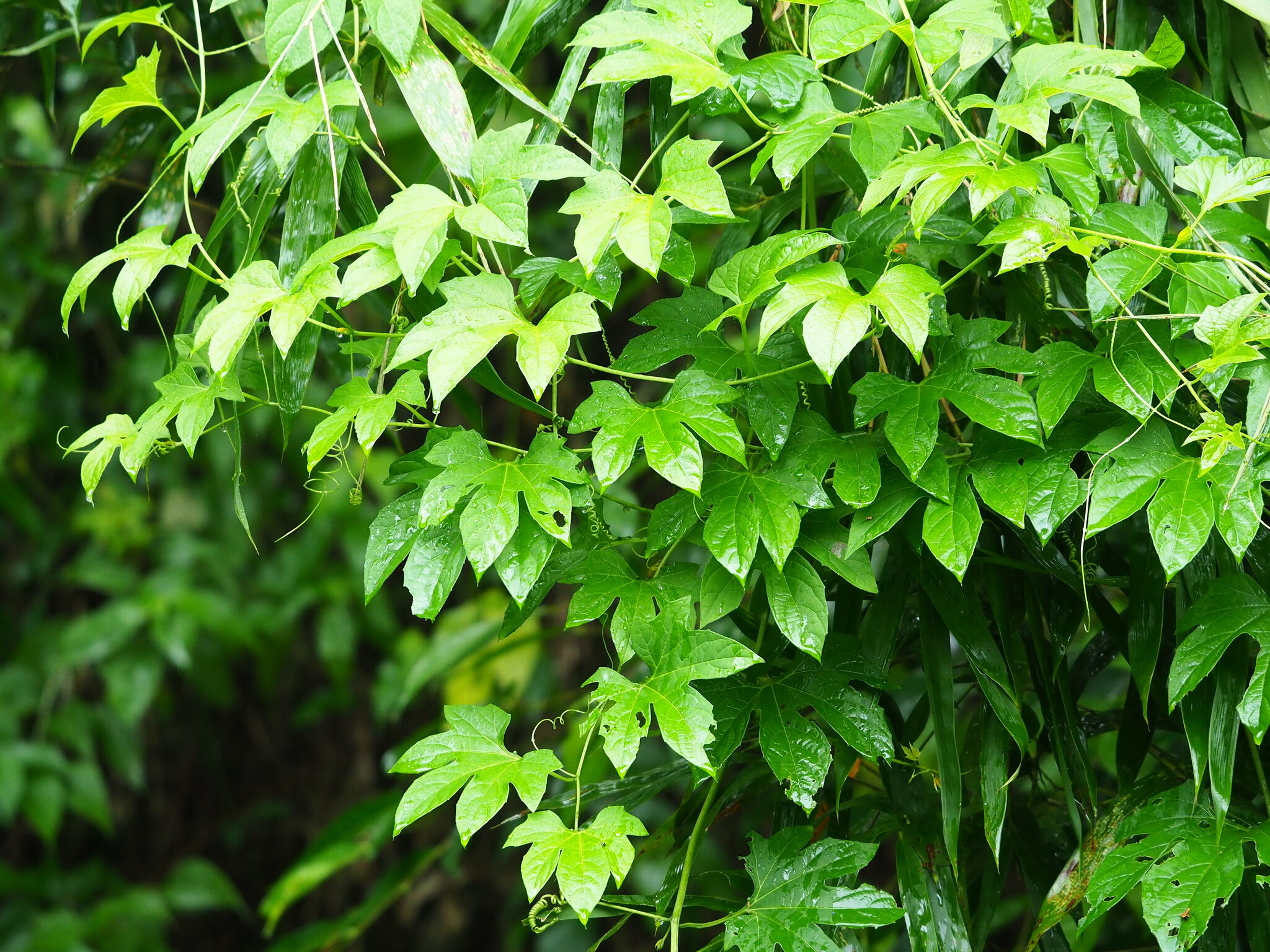
Habit

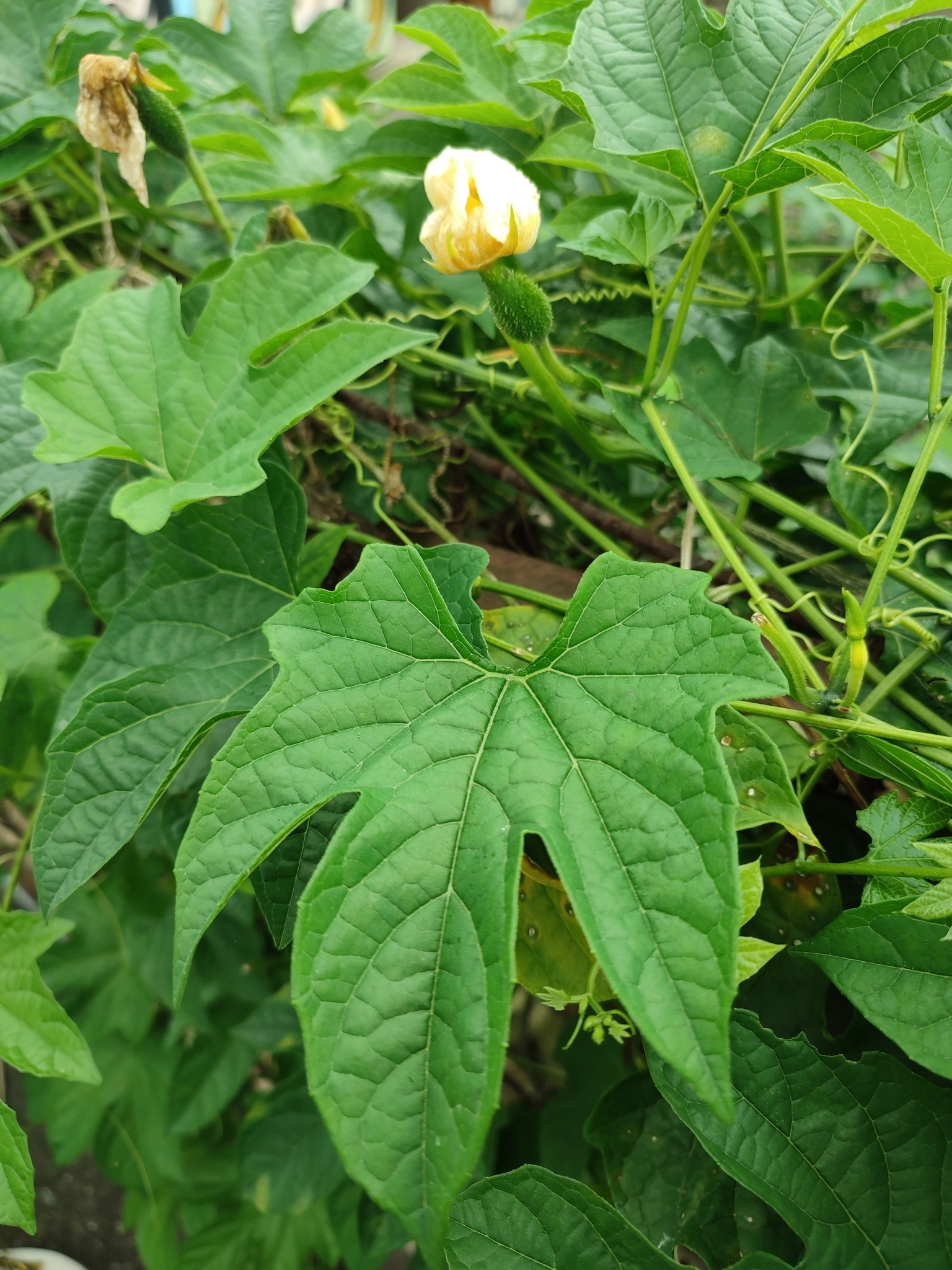
Foliage

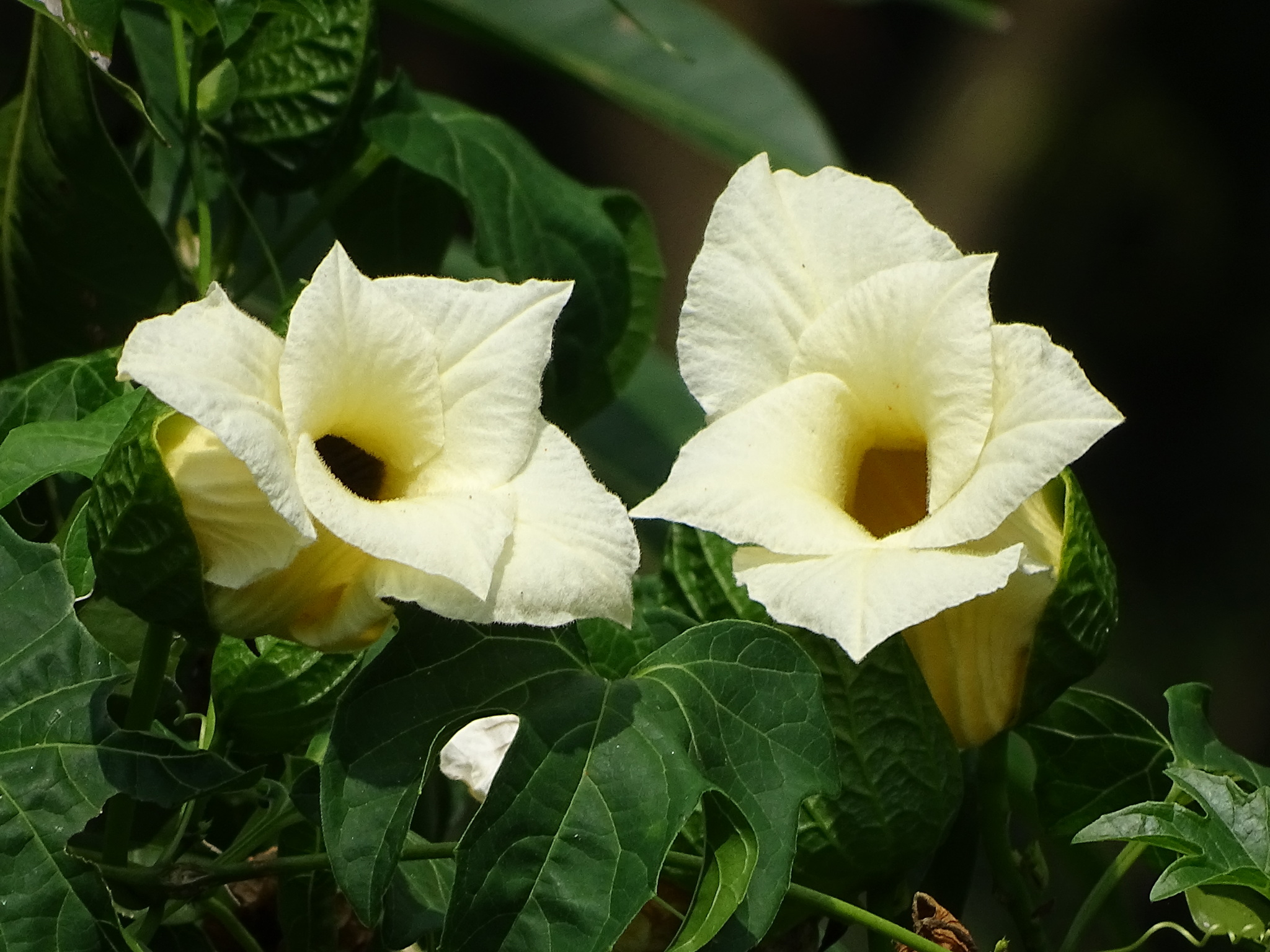
Flowers

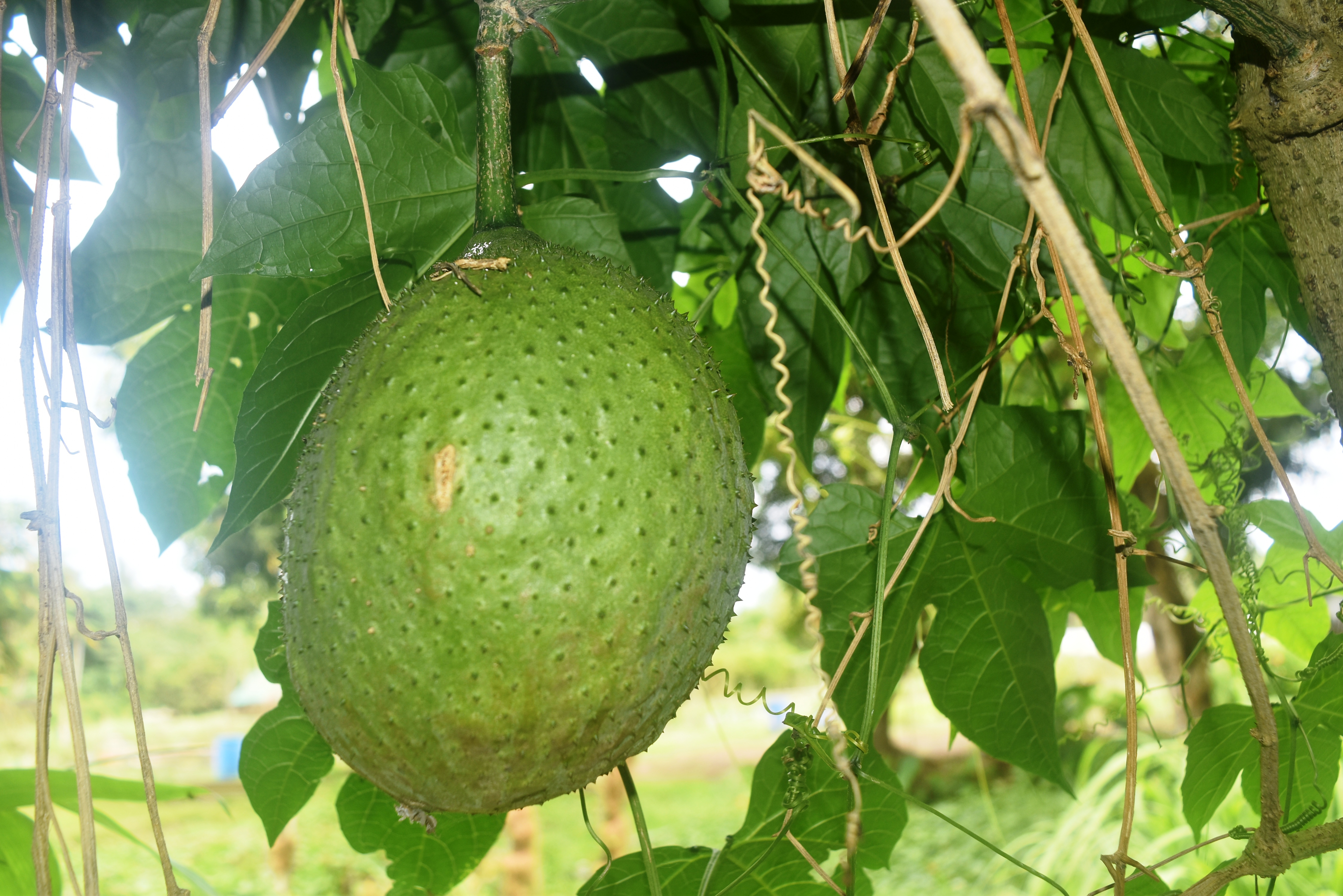
Unripe fruit

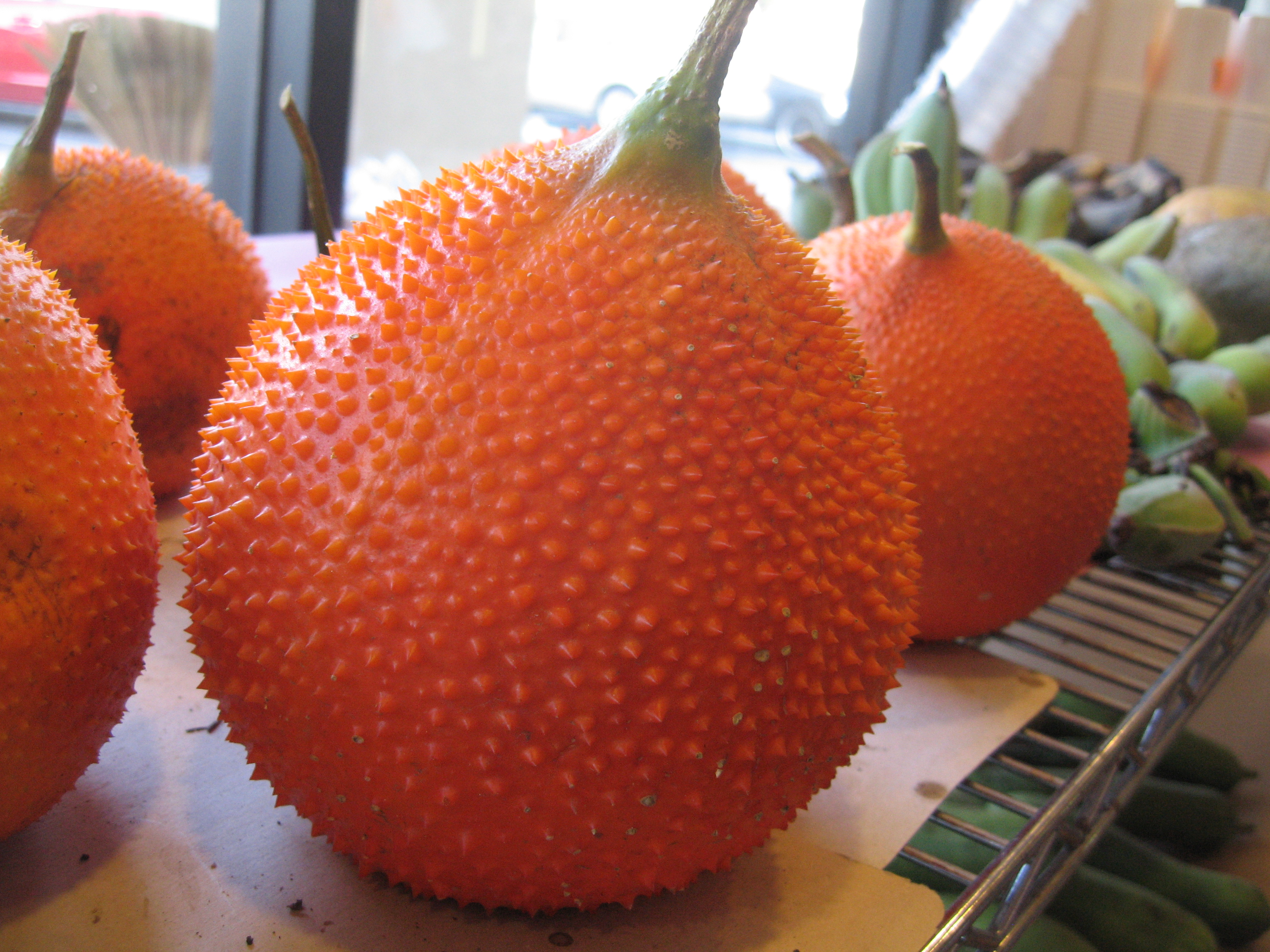
Ripe fruit

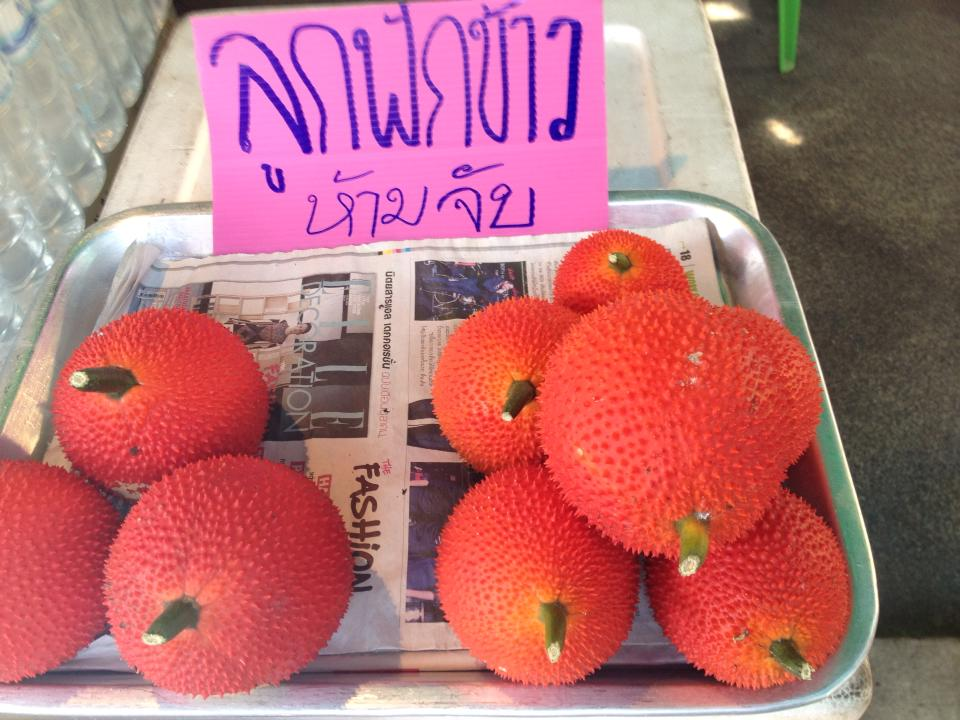
Gac sold in Thailand

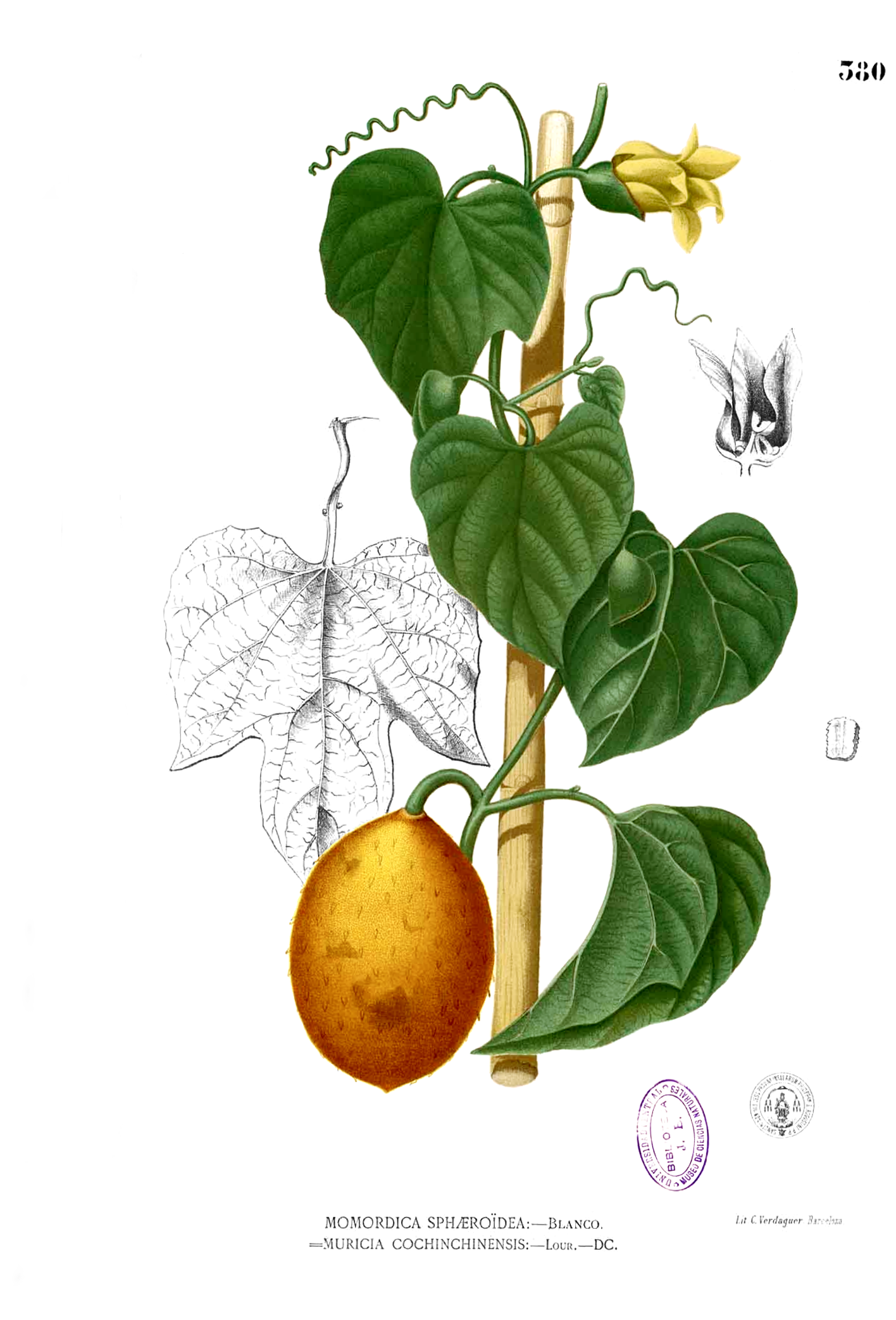
Fruit

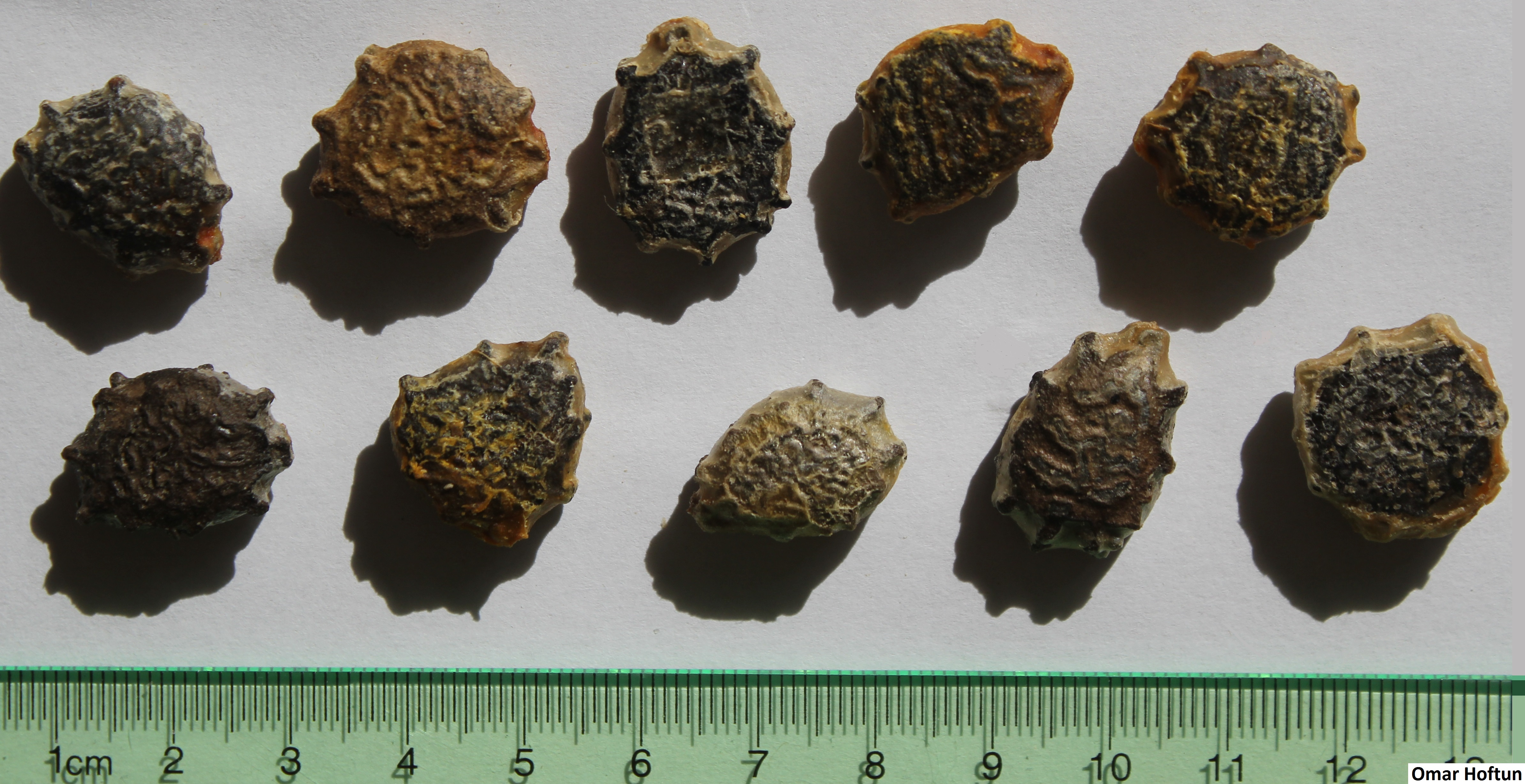
Seeds

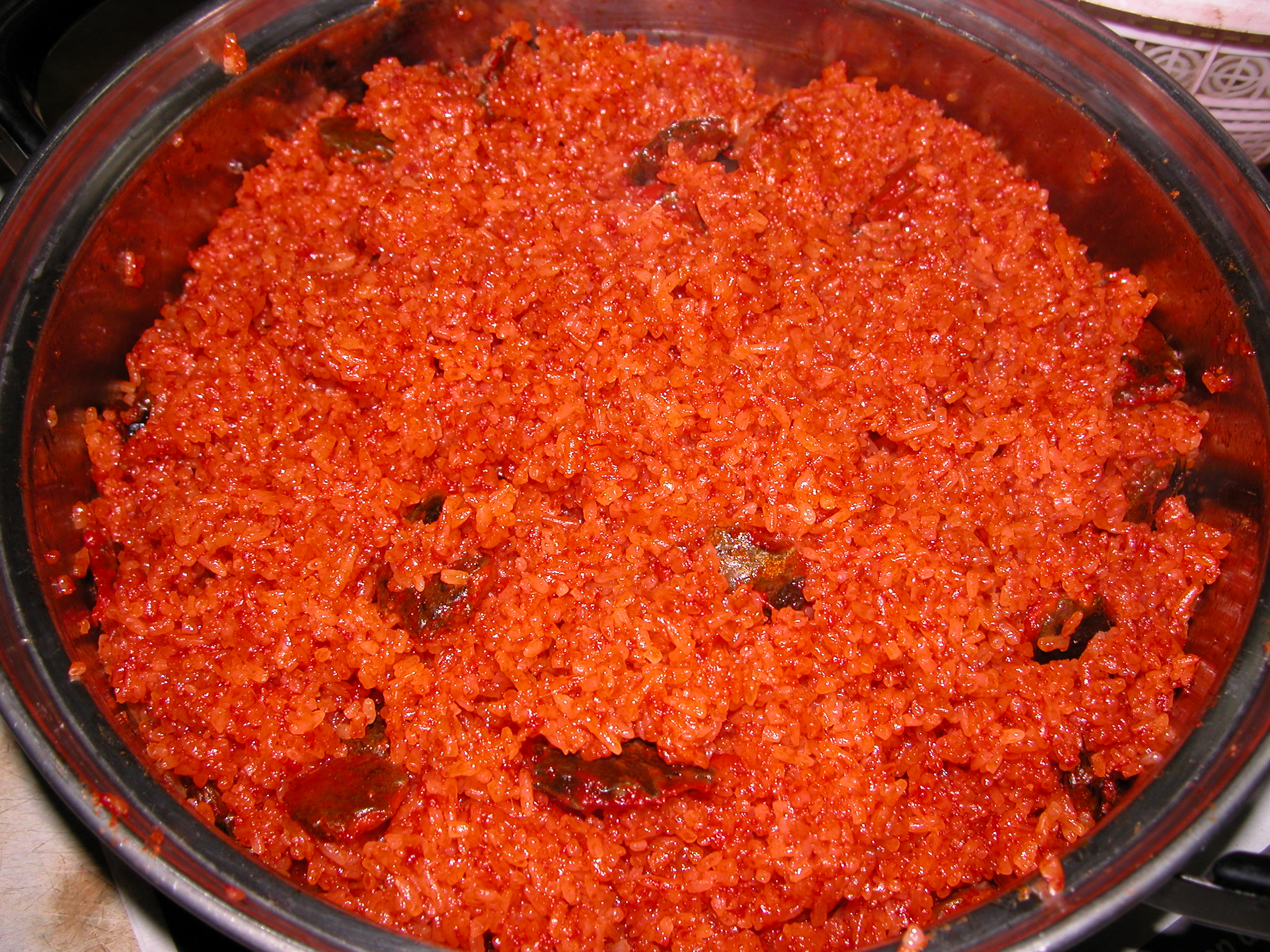
A plate of Xôi gấc
