= List of compounds with carbon numbers 30–39 =

This is a partial list of molecules that contain 30 to 39 carbon atoms.

== C_{30} ==
Chemical formula	Synonyms	CAS number
C_{30}H_{16}	pyranthrene	191-13-9
C_{30}H_{16}O_{8}	hypericin	548-04-9
C_{30}H_{18}	heptaphene	222-75-3
C_{30}H_{18}	trinaphthylene	196-62-3
C_{30}H_{18}	dibenzo(a,c)pentacene	216-08-0
C_{30}H_{18}	dibenzo(a,l)pentacene	216-08-0
C_{30}H_{18}	tetrabenz(a,c,h,j)anthracene	215-11-2
C_{30}H_{18}	dibenzo(c,m)pentaphene	222-51-5
C_{30}H_{18}	naphtho(2,3-c)pentaphene	222-58-2
C_{30}H_{18}	dinaphtho(2,1-c:1',2'-g)phenanthrene	16914-68-4
C_{30}H_{18}	benzo(c)naphtho(2,1-p)chrysene	27798-46-5
C_{30}H_{18}	tribenz(a,c,j)naphthacene	215-96-3
C_{30}H_{18}	dibenzo(b,n)picene	213-44-5
C_{30}H_{18}	benzo(p)hexaphene	222-81-1
C_{30}H_{24}N_{4}O_{8}	azilsartan	863031-21-4
C_{30}H_{24}N_{4}O_{10}	nicofuranose	15351-13-0
C_{30}H_{30}	1,1,2,2-tetra-p-tolylethane	40673-57-2
C_{30}H_{34}FN_{5}O_{5}	frakefamide	188196-22-7
C_{30}H_{40}O_{6}	absinthin	13624-21-0
C_{30}H_{44}O_{7}	ganoderic acid	81907-62-2
C_{30}H_{45}N_{6}O_{16}P	tetrahydromethanopterin	92481-94-2
C_{30}H_{46}O_{4}	glycyrrhetinic acid	471-53-4
C_{30}H_{48}O_{2}	brassicasterol acetate	2458-53-9
C_{30}H_{48}O_{3}	oleanolic acid	508-02-1
C_{30}H_{48}O_{3}	ursolic acid	77-52-1
C_{30}H_{48}O_{4}	corosolic acid	4547-24-4
C_{30}H_{50}	squalene	7683-64-9
C_{30}H_{50}O	gorgosterol	29782-65-8
C_{30}H_{50}O	lanosterol	79-63-0
C_{30}H_{50}O	lupeol	545-47-1
C_{30}H_{50}O_{2}	betulin	473-98-3
C_{30}H_{50}O_{3}	cholesterol ethyl carbonate	23836-43-3
C_{30}H_{50}O_{4}	cucurbalsaminol A	1189131-54-1
C_{30}H_{50}O_{5}	balsaminapentaol	1189131-49-4
C_{30}H_{50}O_{7}	amarasterone A	20853-88-7
C_{30}H_{52}	hopane	471-62-5
C_{30}H_{52}O	ambrein	473-03-0
C_{30}H_{52}O_{2}	ergostanol acetate	4356-09-6
C_{30}H_{52}O_{3}	protopanaxadiol	7755-01-3
C_{30}H_{52}O_{4}	panaxatriol	32791-84-7
C_{30}H_{52}O_{5}	teurilene	96304-92-6
C_{30}H_{52}O_{7}	cubensic acid	136156-79-1
C_{30}H_{52}O_{8}	boldoglucin	1398-22-7
C_{30}H_{54}	lanostane	474-20-4
C_{30}H_{58}O_{4}	didodecyl hexanedioate	3072-02-4
C_{30}H_{58}O_{4}	ethylene dimyristate	627-84-9
C_{30}H_{60}	cyclotriacontane	297-35-8
C_{30}H_{62}	triacontane	638-68-6
C_{30}H_{63}N	trisdecylamine	1070-01-5
C_{30}H_{68}N_{2}O_{4}S_{2}Si_{4}	cystine tetratbdms	107716-02-9
C_{30}H_{60}O_{2}	melissic acid	506-50-3

== C_{31} ==
C_{31}H_{15}NO_{3}	c.i. vat green 3	3271-76-9
C_{31}H_{27}N_{3}O_{5}	nalorphine dinicotinate	3194-25-0
C_{31}H_{32}N_{4}O_{2}	bezitramide	15301-48-1
C_{31}H_{34}ClN_{3}	brilliant violet	105070-70-0
C_{31}H_{42}N_{6}O_{7}	BQ-123	136553-81-6
C_{31}H_{43}N_{3}Na_{10}O_{49}S_{8}	fondaparinux	114870-03-0
C_{31}H_{46}O_{2}	phytomenadione	84-80-0
C_{31}H_{46}O_{2}	vitamin K_{1}	81818-54-4
C_{31}H_{50}O_{2}	stigmasterol acetate	4651-48-3
C_{31}H_{52}O_{2}	cholesterol butanoate	137036-79-4
C_{31}H_{52}O_{2}	clionasterol acetate	4651-54-1
C_{31}H_{52}O_{2}	sitosterol acetate	915-05-9
C_{31}H_{52}O_{3}	vitamin E acetate	58-95-7
C_{31}H_{52}O_{3}	vitamin E acetate	7695-91-2
C_{31}H_{52}O_{4}	cucurbalsaminol B	1189131-55-2

== C_{32} ==
C_{32}H_{2}Br_{16}N_{8}	hexadecabromophthalocyanine	28746-04-5
C_{32}H_{2}Cl_{16}N_{8}	hexadecachlorophthalocyanine	28888-81-5
C_{32}H_{14}	ovalene	190-26-1
C_{32}H_{16}CoN_{8}	cobalt phthalocyanine	3317-67-7
C_{32}H_{16}CuN_{8}	copper phthalocyanine	147-14-8
C_{32}H_{16}FeN_{8}	iron phthalocyanine	132-16-1
C_{32}H_{16}MnN_{8}	manganese phthalocyanine	14325-24-7
C_{32}H_{16}N_{8}Ni	nickel phthalocyanine	14055-02-8
C_{32}H_{16}N_{8}Zn	zinc phthalocyanine	14320-04-8
C_{32}H_{18}N_{8}	phthalocyanine	574-93-6
C_{32}H_{22}N_{6}Na_{2}O_{6}S_{2}	congo red	573-58-0
C_{32}H_{26}	pentaphenylethane	19112-42-6
C_{32}H_{30}O_{3}	dibezylacetic anhydride	96507-33-4
C_{32}H_{38}N_{2}O_{8}	deserpidine	131-01-1
C_{32}H_{38}O_{20}	CTN-986	63947-67-1
C_{32}H_{38}N_{4}	etioporphyrin iii	26608-34-4
C_{32}H_{41}NO_{2}	seldane	50679-08-8
C_{32}H_{44}O_{2}	food orange 7	1109-11-1
C_{32}H_{48}N_{4}O_{8}	17-Dimethylaminoethylamino-17-demethoxygeldanamycin	467214-20-6
C_{32}H_{52}O_{2}	cycloartenol acetate	1259-10-5
C_{32}H_{52}O_{2}	lanosterol acetate	2671-68-3
C_{32}H_{52}O_{2}	parkeol acetate	55570-91-7
C_{32}H_{53}N_{2}O_{4}Br	rocuronium bromide	119302-91-9
C_{32}H_{54}O_{2}	cycloartanol acetate	4575-74-0
C_{32}H_{54}O_{4}	didodecyl phthalate	2432-90-8
C_{32}H_{54}O_{4}	diisododecyl phthalate	40989-56-8
C_{32}H_{64}	cyclodotriacontane	297-39-2
C_{32}H_{64}HgO_{4}	mercuric hexadecanoate	16888-60-1
C_{32}H_{64}O_{2}	dotriacontanoic acid	3625-52-3
C_{32}H_{64}O_{2}	ethyl triacontanate	7505-12-6
C_{32}H_{66}	dotriacontane	544-85-4
C_{32}H_{68}O_{4}Si	octyl silicate	78-14-8
C_{32}H_{69}NO	tetraoctylammonium hydroxide	17756-58-0

== C_{33} ==
C_{33}H_{30}N_{4}O_{2}	telmisartan	144701-48-4
C_{33}H_{34}N_{4}O_{6}	biliverdin	114-25-0
C_{33}H_{35}N_{5}O_{5}	ergotamine	113-15-5
C_{33}H_{35}FN_{2}O_{5}	atorvastatin	134523-00-5
C_{33}H_{35}NO_{13}	elsamitrucin	97068-30-9
C_{33}H_{36}N_{4}O_{6}	bilirubin	635-65-4
C_{33}H_{37}N_{5}O_{5}	dihydroergotamine mesylate	6190-39-2
C_{33}H_{38}N_{4}O_{6}	phycoerythrobilin	18097-67-1
C_{33}H_{38}N_{6}	hodgkinsine	18210-71-4
C_{33}H_{40}N_{4}O_{6}	phycocyanobilin	
C_{33}H_{40}N_{2}O_{9}	methoserpidine	865-04-3
C_{33}H_{40}N_{2}O_{9}	reserpine	50-55-5
C_{33}H_{40}N_{6}O_{7}	casokefamide	98815-38-4
C_{33}H_{40}O_{15}	Icariin	489-32-7
C_{33}H_{40}O_{19}	Robinin	301-19-9
C_{33}H_{42}N_{4}O_{6}	urobilin	1856-98-0
C_{33}H_{42}O_{19}	Troxerutin	56764-99-9
C_{33}H_{44}N_{4}O_{6}	urobilinogen	14684-37-8
C_{33}H_{46}N_{4}O_{6}	stercobilin	34217-90-8
C_{33}H_{48}O_{6}	leptomycin	87081-35-4
C_{33}H_{57}EuO_{9}	europium dipivaloylmethanate	500022-98-0
C_{33}H_{57}GdO_{9}	gadolinium dipiraloylmethanate	500022-99-1
C_{33}H_{57}LaO_{9}	lanthanum dipivaloylmethanate	500023-20-1
C_{33}H_{57}NdO_{9}	neodymium dipivaloylmethanate	500023-21-2
C_{33}H_{68}	tritriacontane	630-05-7
C_{33}H_{68}O	tritriacontanol	71353-61-2

== C_{34} ==
C_{34}H_{16}O_{2}	dibenzanthrone	116-71-2
C_{34}H_{16}O_{2}	isodibenzanthrone	128-64-3
C_{34}H_{20}	isoviolanthrene	4430-29-9
C_{34}H_{20}	violanthrene	81-31-2
C_{34}H_{24}O_{22}	pedunculagin	
C_{34}H_{31}CuN_{4}Na_{3}O_{6}	chlorophyllin	11006-34-1
C_{34}H_{32}N_{4}O_{4}	zinc protoporphyrin	15442-64-5
C_{34}H_{36}N_{2}O_{6}	pseudomorphine	125-24-6
C_{34}H_{38}N_{4}O_{6}	hematoporphyrin	14459-29-1
C_{34}H_{41}N_{7}O_{5}	dabigatran	211915-06-9
C_{34}H_{42}O_{20}	Xanthorhamnin	1324-63-6
C_{34}H_{50}O_{2}	cholesteryl benzoate	604-32-0
C_{34}H_{57}N_{2}O_{4}	vecuronium bromide	50700-72-6
C_{34}H_{66}O_{6}	dicetyl peroxydicarbonate	26322-14-5
C_{34}H_{68}O_{2}	tetratriacontanoic acid	38232-04-1

== C_{35} ==
C_{35}H_{28}O_{5}N_{4}Mg	chlorophyll c2	
C_{35}H_{30}O_{5}N_{4}Mg	chlorophyll c1	
C_{35}H_{30}N_{4}O_{4}	midostaurin	120685-11-2
C_{35}H_{36}N_{4}O_{5}	pheophorbide a	15664-29-6
C_{35}H_{38}Cl_{2}N_{8}O_{4}	itraconazole	84625-61-6
C_{35}H_{39}F_{2}N_{7}O_{4}	pramiconazole	
C_{35}H_{42}N_{2}O_{9}	rescinnamine	24815-24-5
C_{35}H_{42}N_{2}O_{11}	syrosingopine	84-36-6
C_{35}H_{49}N_{11}O_{9}S_{2}	eptifibatide	188627-80-7
C_{35}H_{50}N_{8}O_{6}S_{2}	patellamide A	81120-73-2
C_{35}H_{58}O_{9}	bafilomycin	88899-55-2

== C_{36} ==
C_{36}H_{18}	decacyclene	191-48-0
C_{36}H_{26}	pentaphenyl benzene	18631-82-8
C_{36}H_{30}OSi_{2}	hexaphenyldisiloxane	1829-40-9
C_{36}H_{30}O_{3}Si_{3}	hexaphenylcyclotrisiloxane	512-63-0
C_{36}H_{30}Sn_{2}	hexaphenylditin	1064-10-4
C_{36}H_{38}N_{4}O_{8}	isocoproporphyrin	
C_{36}H_{41}ClN_{8}O_{4}S	mitratapide	179602-65-4
C_{36}H_{42}N_{4}O_{4}	mesoporphyrin ix dimethyl ester	1263-63-4
C_{36}H_{44}N_{4}O_{6}	coporprophyrinogen I	31110-56-2
C_{36}H_{44}N_{4}O_{8}	coproporphyrinogen III	2624-63-7
C_{36}H_{54}O_{12}	bryoamaride	61105-51-9
C_{36}H_{56}O_{14}	digitalin	752-61-4
C_{36}H_{59}NO_{6}	dimethyl carbocampesteryloxy glutarate	107928-38-1
C_{36}H_{60}O_{2}	vitamin A palmitate	79-81-2
C_{36}H_{70}HgO_{4}	mercuric octadecanoate	645-99-8
C_{36}H_{72}	cyclohexatriacontane	297-50-7
C_{36}H_{75}N	tridodecylamine	102-87-4

== C_{37} ==
C_{37}H_{37}N_{2}O_{10}S_{3}	fast green FCF	2353-45-9
C_{37}H_{41}N_{2}O_{6}	tubocurarine	1370-17-8
C_{37}H_{42}Cl_{2}N_{2}O_{6}	tubocurarine chloride	57-95-4
C_{37}H_{42}F_{2}N_{8}O_{4}	posaconazole	171228-49-2
C_{37}H_{76}	heptatriacontane	7194-84-5

== C_{38} ==
C_{38}H_{30}	hexaphenylethane	17854-07-8
C_{38}H_{30}	Gomberg's dimer	18909-18-7
C_{38}H_{41}N_{5}O_{9}	talaporfin	110230-98-3
C_{38}H_{47}N_{5}O_{7}S_{2}	simeprevir	923604-59-5
C_{38}H_{55}Na_{9}O_{49}S_{7}	idraparinux	149920-56-9
C_{38}H_{66}O_{2}	cholesteryl undecanoate	24385-24-8
C_{38}H_{78}	octatriacontane	7194-85-6

== C_{39} ==
C_{39}H_{30}N_{6}	hexaphenylisomelamine	604-45-5
C_{39}H_{30}N_{6}	hexaphenylmelamine	18343-40-3
C_{39}H_{37}F_{6}N_{3}O_{2}	lomitapide	182431-12-5
C_{39}H_{48}N_{4}O_{4}	2-(1-Hexyloxyethyl)-2-devinyl pyropheophorbide-a	149402-51-7
C_{39}H_{49}NO_{16}	nogalamycin	1404-15-5
C_{39}H_{54}N_{10}O_{13}S	amaninamide	58311-85-2
C_{39}H_{64}N_{4}O_{16}	tunicamycin	11089-65-9
C_{39}H_{68}O_{2}	cholesteryl laurate	1908-11-8
C_{39}H_{74}O_{6}	trilaurin	37318-95-9
C_{39}H_{80}	nonatriacontane	7194-86-7
C_{39}H_{81}N	nonatriacontanamine	66576-42-9

== See also ==
- Carbon number
