= 4'-Nitroflavonol =

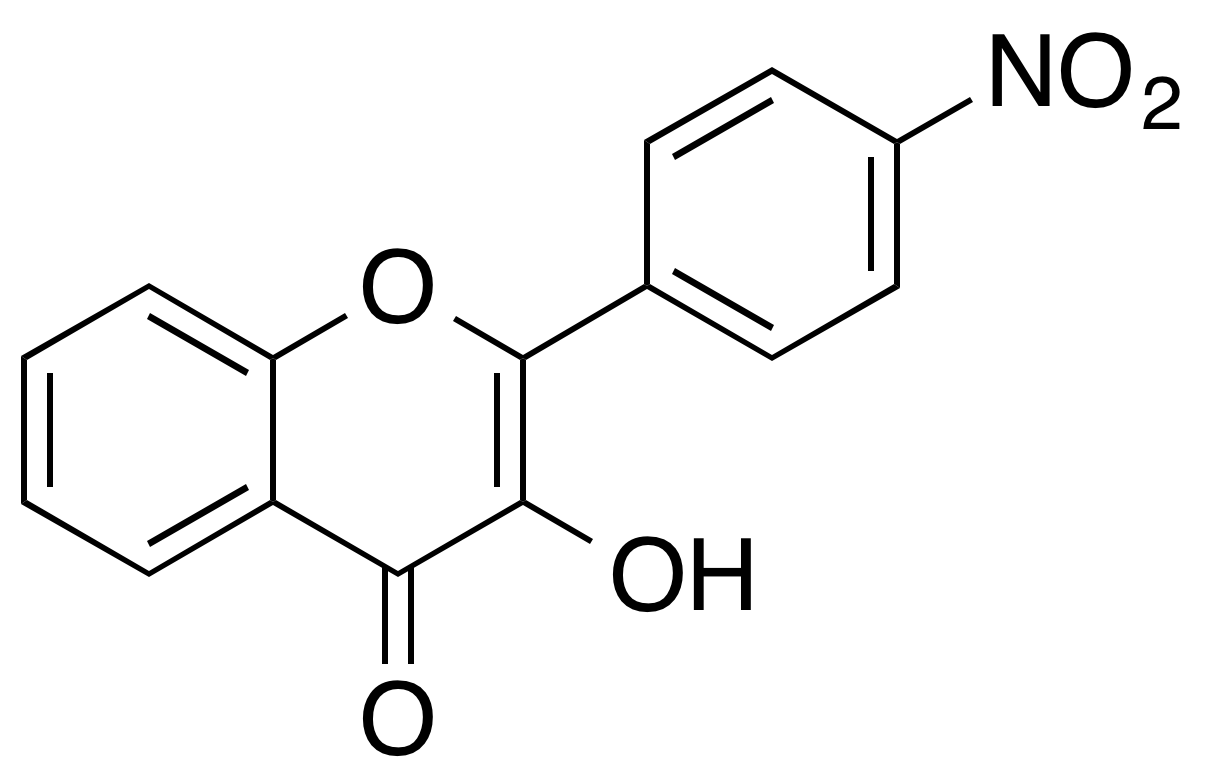

Names
- IUPAC name 3-Hydroxy-4′-nitroflavone
- Systematic IUPAC name 3-Hydroxy-2-(4-nitrophenyl)-4H-1-benzopyran-4-one

Identifiers
3D model (JSmol)	Interactive image
ChemSpider	3325444
PubChem CID	4111802
- InChI: InChI=1S/C15H9NO5/c17-13-11-3-1-2-4-12(11)21-15(14(13)18)9-5-7-10(8-6-9)16(19)20/h1-8,18H Key: YECFKQSYRZNFMD-UHFFFAOYSA-N
- SMILES: C1=CC=C2C(=C1)C(=O)C(=C(O2)C3=CC=C(C=C3)[N+](=O)[O-])O

Properties
Chemical formula	C_{15}H_{9}NO_{5}
Molar mass	283.239 g·mol^{−1}
- Except where otherwise noted, data are given for materials in their standard state (at 25 °C [77 °F], 100 kPa). Infobox references

4'-Nitroflavonol is a pale yellow solid. This substance belongs to the subclass of flavonols of the class of flavonoids.

== Synthesis ==
4'-Nitroflavonol can be synthesized by the Algar–Flynn–Oyamada reaction of the chalcone formed from 4-nitrobenzaldehyde and 2-hydroxyacetophenone.

== Properties ==
Fluorescence is reported despite the presence of a nitro group at the 4' position of the molecule, which is known as a fluorescence quencher. An excited state intramolecular proton transfer reaction for 4'-nitroflavonol has also been observed.
