= C31H52O4 =

The molecular formula C_{31}H_{52}O_{4} (molar mass: 488.74 g/mol) may refer to:

- Balsaminol B, or 7β-methoxycucurbita-5,24-diene-3β,23(R),29-triol
- Cucurbalsaminol B
