= Cucurbalsaminol =

Cucurbalsaminol may refer to either of two chemical compounds:

- Cucurbalsaminol A
- Cucurbalsaminol B
