= C30H50O4 =

The molecular formula C_{30}H_{50}O_{4} (molar mass: 474.71 g/mol) may refer to:

- Balsaminol A, or cucurbita-5,24-diene-3β,7β,23(R),29-tetraol
- Cucurbalsaminol A
