= Balsaminol =

Balsaminol may refer to either of two chemical compounds:

- Balsaminol A
- Balsaminol B
