= Hydroxyflavone =

Hydroxyflavone may refer to the following chemical compounds:

- 3-Hydroxyflavone, the backbone of all flavonols
- 6-Hydroxyflavone, one of the noncompetitive inhibitors of cytochrome P450 2C9
