= Fustel =

Fustel may refer to:

- Numa Denis Fustel de Coulanges (1830–1889), a French historian
- an alternative name for fisetin, a flavonol
