= Josef Herzig =

Austrian chemist (1853–1924)

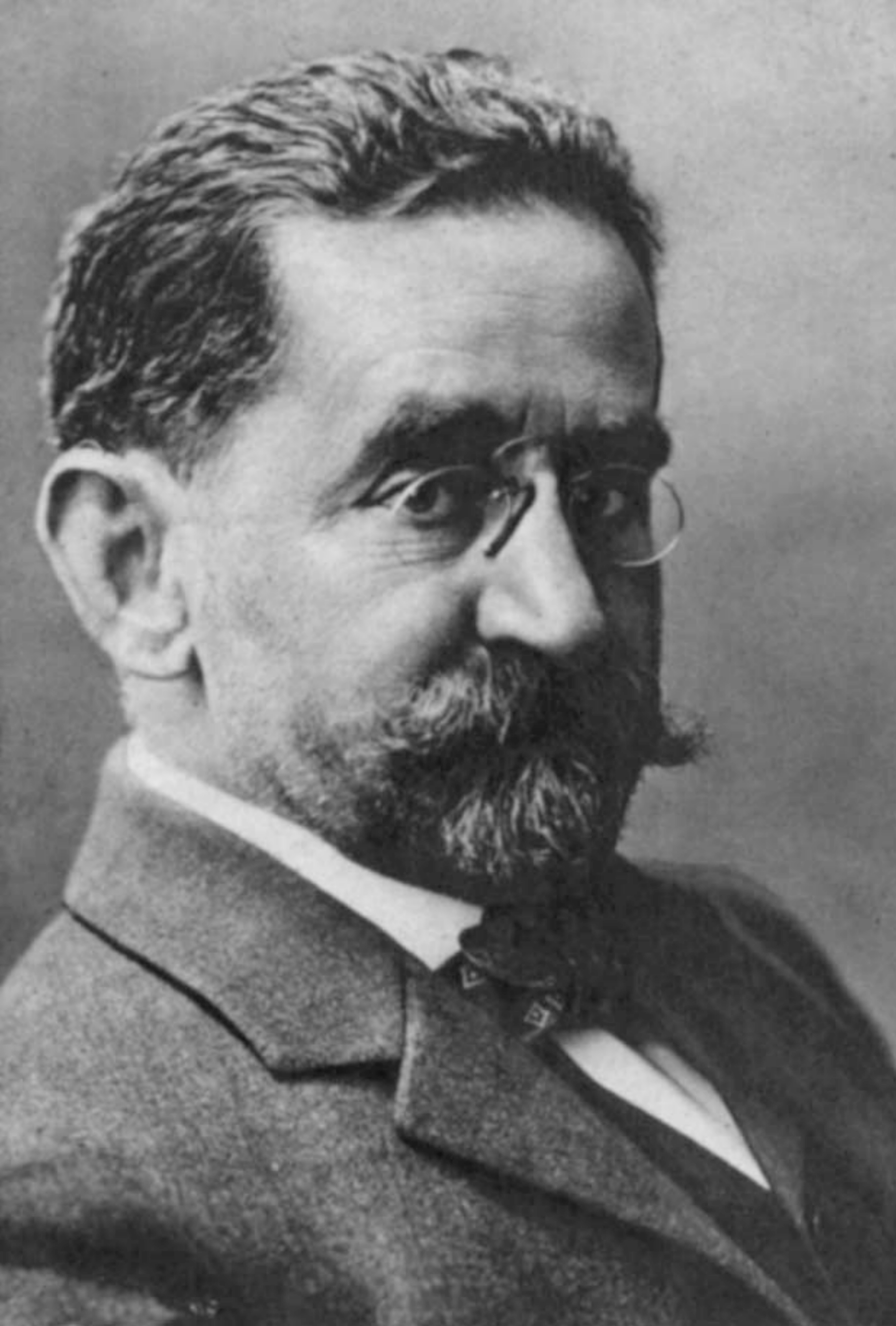
- Herzig c. 1920
- Born: 25 September 1853; Sanok, Austria-Hungary
- Died: 4 July 1924 (aged 70); Vienna, Austria-Hungary
- Education: University of Vienna
- Known for: Herzig–Meyer alkimide group determination
- Awards: Lieben Prize (1902)
- Scientific career
- Workplaces: University of Vienna
- Doctoral advisor: Ludwig Barth
- Doctoral students: Hans Meyer, Jacob Pollak

Signature
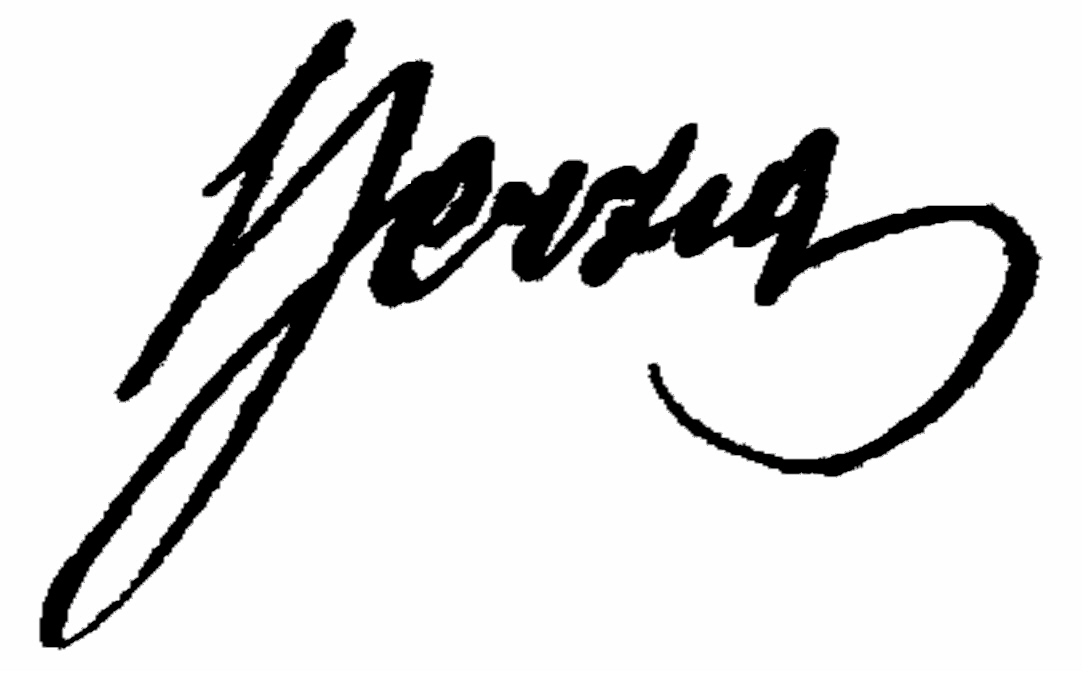

Josef Herzig (25 September 1853 – 4 July 1924) was an Austrian chemist.

Herzig was born in Sanok, Galicia, which at that time was part of Austria-Hungary. Herzig went to school in Breslau until 1874, started studying chemistry at the University of Vienna but joined August Wilhelm von Hofmann at the University of Berlin in the second semester. He worked with Robert Bunsen at the University of Heidelberg and received his PhD for work with Ludwig Barth at the University of Vienna. He later became lecturer and, in 1897, professor at the University of Vienna. He died in Vienna in 1924.

== Work ==
Herzig was active in the chemistry of natural products. He succeeded in determining the structure of flavonoids quercetin, fisetin and rhamnetin as well as several alkaloids.

== See also ==
- Jacobsen rearrangement
