= Balsaminapentaol =

Names
- IUPAC name (23R,24R)-9-Methyl-19-nor-9β,10α-lanosta-5,25-diene-3β,7β,23,24,29-pentol
- Systematic IUPAC name (1R,3aS,3bR,4S,6S,7S,9aS,9bS,11aR)-1-[(2R,4R,5R)-4,5-Dihydroxy-6-methylhept-6-en-2-yl]-6-(hydroxymethyl)-3a,6,9b,11a-tetramethyl-2,3,3a,3b,4,6,7,8,9,9a,9b,10,11,11a-tetradecahydro-1H-cyclopenta[a]phenanthrene-4,7-diol
- Other names Cucurbita-5,25-diene-3β,7β,23R,24R,29-pentaol; (3β,4β,7β,9β,10α,23R,24R)-4-(Hydroxymethyl)-4,9,14-trimethyl-19-norcholesta-5,25-diene-3,7,23,24-tetrol; Balsaminapentaol A

Identifiers
CAS Number	1189131-49-4
3D model (JSmol)	Interactive image
ChEMBL	ChEMBL1078341
ChemSpider	24531941
PubChem CID	44607275
UNII	2T3PK8ZV3C
CompTox Dashboard (EPA)	DTXSID70659645
- InChI: InChI=1S/C30H50O5/c1-17(2)25(35)22(32)14-18(3)19-10-11-30(7)26-23(33)15-21-20(8-9-24(34)28(21,5)16-31)27(26,4)12-13-29(19,30)6/h15,18-20,22-26,31-35H,1,8-14,16H2,2-7H3/t18-,19-,20-,22-,23+,24+,25-,26-,27+,28-,29-,30+/m1/s1 Key: LJWAEAIXBCCHLR-ITWKNSBQSA-N
- SMILES: C[C@H](C[C@@H](O)[C@H](O)C(C)=C)[C@@]1([H])CC[C@@]2(C)[C@]3([H])[C@@H](O)C=C4[C@@](C)(CO)[C@@H](O)CC[C@@]4([H])[C@]3(C)CC[C@@]21C

Properties
Chemical formula	C_{30}H_{50}O_{5}
Molar mass	490.725 g·mol^{−1}
- Except where otherwise noted, data are given for materials in their standard state (at 25 °C [77 °F], 100 kPa). verify (what is ?) Infobox references

Balsaminapentaol or cucurbita-5,25-diene-3β,7β,23(R),24(R),29-pentaol, is a chemical compound with formula C_{30}H_{50}O_{5}, found in the Balsam apple vine (Momordica balsamina). It is a cucurbitane-type triterpenoid, related to cucurbitacin, isolated by C. Ramalhete and others in 2009.

Balsaminepentaol is an amorphous powder soluble in methanol and ethyl acetate but insoluble in n-hexane. It is cytotoxic at about 50 μM.

== See also ==
- Balsaminol A
- Balsaminol B
- Cucurbalsaminol A
- Cucurbalsaminol B
- Karavilagenin E
