= Karavilagenin E =

Names
- IUPAC name (3S,5R,8S,9S,10S,13R,14S,17R)-17-((2R)-4-hydroxy-6-methylhept-5-en-2-yl)-4,4,13,14-tetramethyl-2,3,4,8,10,11,12,13,14,15,16,17-dodecahydro-1H-5,9-(epoxymethano)cyclopenta[a]phenanthren-3-ol

Identifiers
CAS Number	877603-72-0
3D model (JSmol)	Interactive image
ChEMBL	ChEMBL1078077
ChemSpider	24654295
PubChem CID	66559251
UNII	RSQ68AYN9R
CompTox Dashboard (EPA)	DTXSID80735207
- InChI: InChI=1S/C30H48O3/c1-19(2)16-21(31)17-20(3)22-10-12-28(7)23-11-13-30-24(8-9-25(32)26(30,4)5)29(23,18-33-30)15-14-27(22,28)6/h11,13,16,20-25,31-32H,8-10,12,14-15,17-18H2,1-7H3/t20-,21+,22-,23+,24+,25+,27-,28+,29+,30-/m1/s1 Key: BZKMSMPQWDQSDS-ZRBXTNFGSA-N
- SMILES: C[C@H](CC(O)/C=C(C)/C)[C@@]1([H])CC[C@@]2(C)[C@]3([H])C=C[C@]45C(C)(C)[C@@H](O)CC[C@@]4([H])[C@]3(CO5)CC[C@@]21C

Properties
Chemical formula	C_{30}H_{48}O_{3}
Molar mass	456.711 g·mol^{−1}
- Except where otherwise noted, data are given for materials in their standard state (at 25 °C [77 °F], 100 kPa). verify (what is ?) Infobox references

Karavilagenin E is a chemical compound found in the Balsam apple vine (Momordica balsamina). It is a cucurbitane-type triterpenoid, related to cucurbitacin.

Karavilagenin E is soluble in methanol and ethyl acetate but insoluble in n-hexane.

== See also ==
- Balsaminapentaol
- Balsaminol A
- Balsaminol B
- Cucurbalsaminol A
- Cucurbalsaminol B
