= C12H22O10 =

The molecular formula C_{12}H_{22}O_{10} (molar mass: 326.29 g/mol, exact mass: 326.121297 u) may refer to:

- Neohesperidose or 2-O-alpha-L-Rhamnopyranosyl-D-glucopyranose
- Robinose
- Rutinose or 6-O-alpha-L-Rhamnopyranosyl-D-glucupyranose
