= Auwers synthesis =

Series of reactions in organic chemistry

Named after	Karl von Auwers
Reaction type	Coupling reaction

Identifiers
RSC ontology ID	RXNO:0000474

The Auwers synthesis is a series of organic reactions forming a flavonol from a coumarone. This reaction was first reported by Karl von Auwers in 1908.

The Auwers synthesis

The first step in this procedure is an acid catalyzed aldol condensation between benzaldehyde and a 3-cyclooxapentanone to an o-hydroxychalcone. Bromination of the alkene group gives a dibromo-adduct which rearranges to the flavonol by reaction with potassium hydroxide.

== Mechanism ==
A possible mechanism for the rearrangement step is shown below:

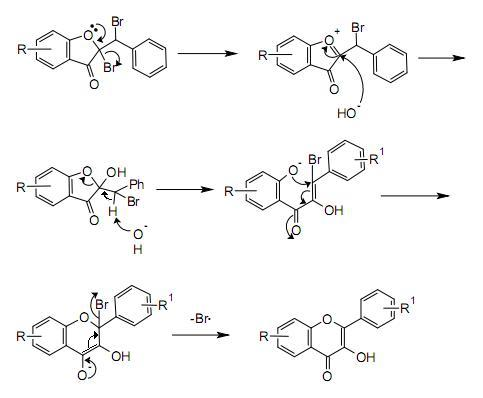
Mechanism

== See also ==
- Algar–Flynn–Oyamada reaction
- Allan–Robinson reaction
