= Flavonol-3-O-beta-glucoside O-malonyltransferase =

Class of enzymes

flavonol-3-O-beta-glucoside O-malonyltransferase

Identifiers
- EC no.: 2.3.1.116
- CAS no.: 78413-11-3

Databases
- IntEnz: IntEnz view
- BRENDA: BRENDA entry
- ExPASy: NiceZyme view
- KEGG: KEGG entry
- MetaCyc: metabolic pathway
- PRIAM: profile
- PDB structures: RCSB PDB PDBe PDBsum
- Gene Ontology: AmiGO / QuickGO
Search
- PMC: articles
- PubMed: articles
- NCBI: proteins

In enzymology, a flavonol-3-O-beta-glucoside O-malonyltransferase (EC 2.3.1.116) is an enzyme that catalyzes the chemical reaction

malonyl-CoA + flavonol 3-O-beta-D-glucoside $\rightleftharpoons$ CoA + flavonol 3-O-(6-O-malonyl-beta-D-glucoside)

Thus, the two substrates of this enzyme are malonyl-CoA and flavonol 3-O-beta-D-glucoside, whereas its two products are CoA and flavonol 3-O-(6-O-malonyl-beta-D-glucoside).

This enzyme belongs to the family of transferases, specifically those acyltransferases transferring groups other than aminoacyl groups. The systematic name of this enzyme class is malonyl-CoA:flavonol-3-O-beta-D-glucoside 6"-O-malonyltransferase. Other names in common use include flavonol 3-O-glucoside malonyltransferase, MAT-3, and malonyl-coenzyme A:flavonol-3-O-glucoside malonyltransferase.
