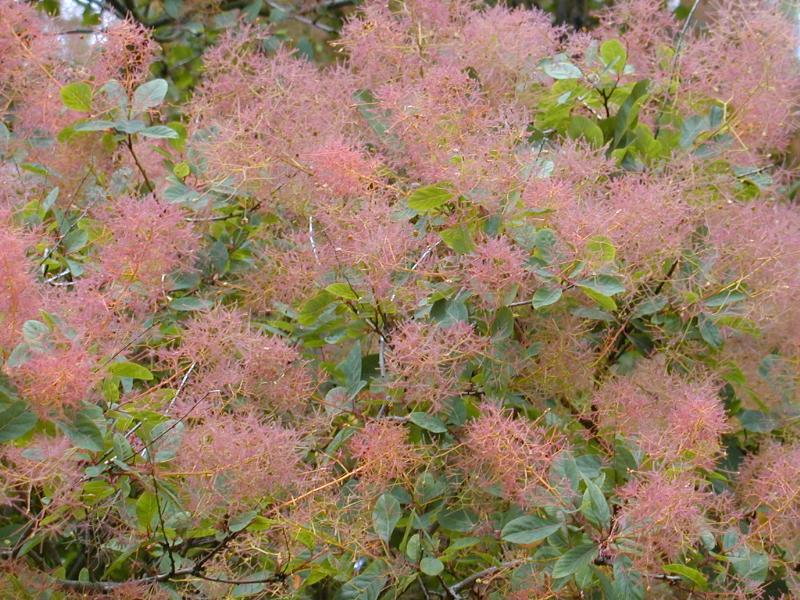
- Foliage and seed heads

Scientific classification
- Kingdom: Plantae
- Clade: Embryophytes
- Clade: Tracheophytes
- Clade: Spermatophytes
- Clade: Angiosperms
- Clade: Eudicots
- Clade: Rosids
- Order: Sapindales
- Family: Anacardiaceae
- Genus: Cotinus
- Species: C. coggygria

Binomial name
- Cotinus coggygria Scop.

Synonyms
- Rhus cotinus

= Cotinus coggygria =

Species of plant

Cotinus coggygria, syn. Rhus cotinus, the European smoketree, Eurasian smoketree, smoke tree, smoke bush, Venetian sumach, or dyer's sumach, is a Eurasian species of flowering plant in the family Anacardiaceae.

== Description ==
It is a multiple-branching deciduous shrub growing to 5–7 metres (16–23 feet) tall with an open, spreading, irregular habit, only rarely forming a small tree. The leaves are 3–8 centimetres (1 1/4–3 1/4 inches) long rounded ovals, green with a waxy glaucous sheen. The autumn colour can be strikingly varied, from peach and yellow to scarlet. The flowers are numerous, produced in large inflorescences 15–30 cm (6–12 in) long; each flower 5–10 millimetres (1/4–3/8 in) in diameter, with five pale yellow petals. Most of the flowers in each inflorescence abort, elongating into yellowish-pink to pinkish-purple feathery plumes (when viewed en masse these have a wispy 'smoke-like' appearance, hence the common name "smoke tree") which surround the small (2–3 mm or 1/16–1/8 in) drupaceous fruit that develop.

== Fossil record ==
Macrofossils of C. coggygria from the early Pliocene epoch have been found in Western Georgia in the Caucasus region.

== Distribution and habitat ==
The species is native to a large area from southern Europe, east across central Asia and the Himalayas to northern China.

== Uses ==
=== Ornamental plant ===
It is commonly grown as an ornamental plant, with several cultivars available. Many of these have been selected for purple foliage and flowers.

The following cultivars have gained the Royal Horticultural Society's Award of Garden Merit:-

- 'Flame'
- Golden Spirit='Ancot'
- 'Royal Purple'
- 'Young Lady'

=== Dyestuff ===
The wood was formerly used to make the yellow dye called young fustic (fisetin), now replaced by synthetic dyes.

The species, along with other members of the sumac family, has been used to make red dyes for textiles including weft-wrapped soumak rugs and bags in the Middle East. The names sumac and soumak likely derive from the Arabic and Syriac word ܣܘܡܩܐ 'summāq', meaning "red".

== Gallery ==
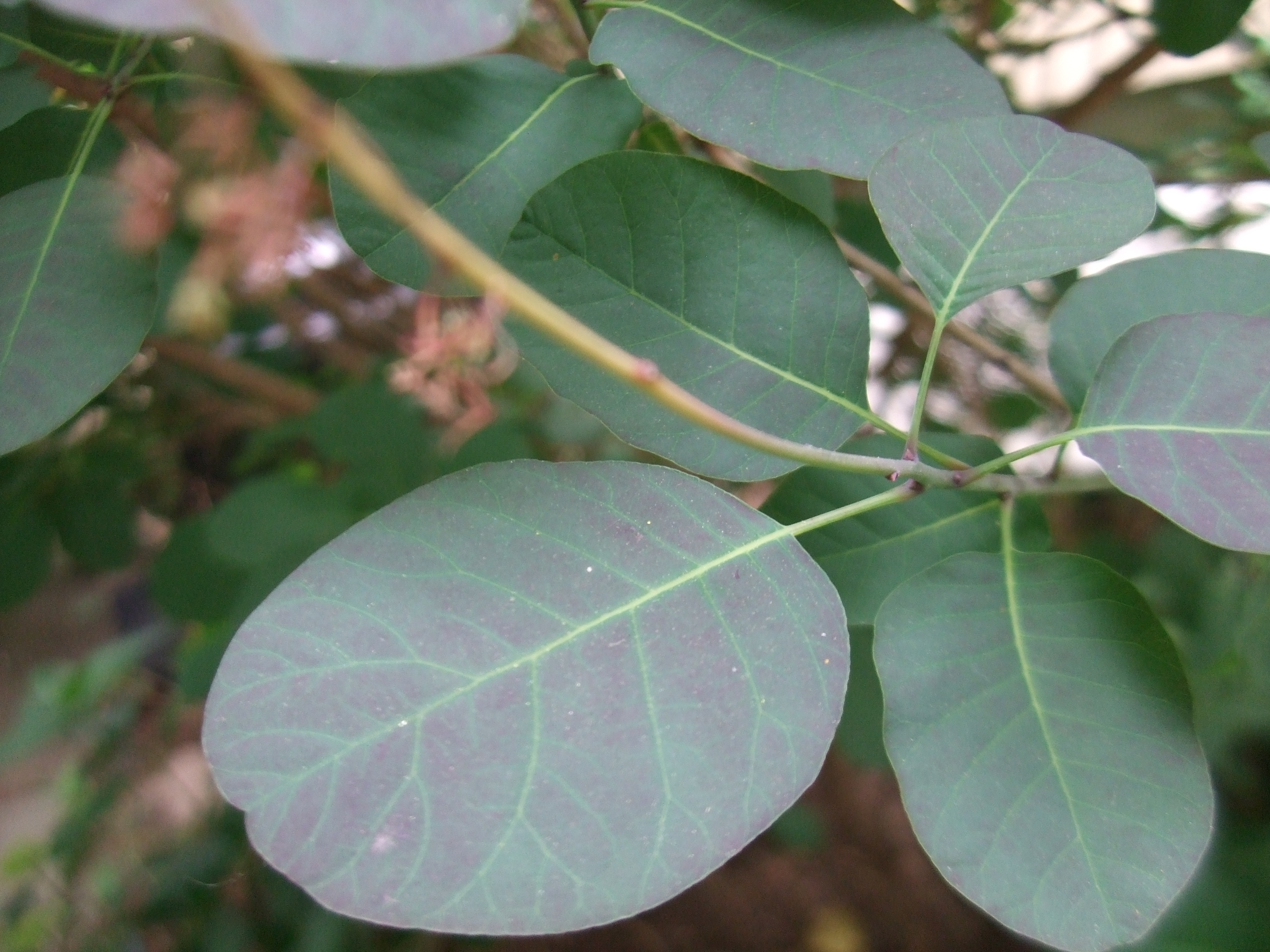
Green leaves

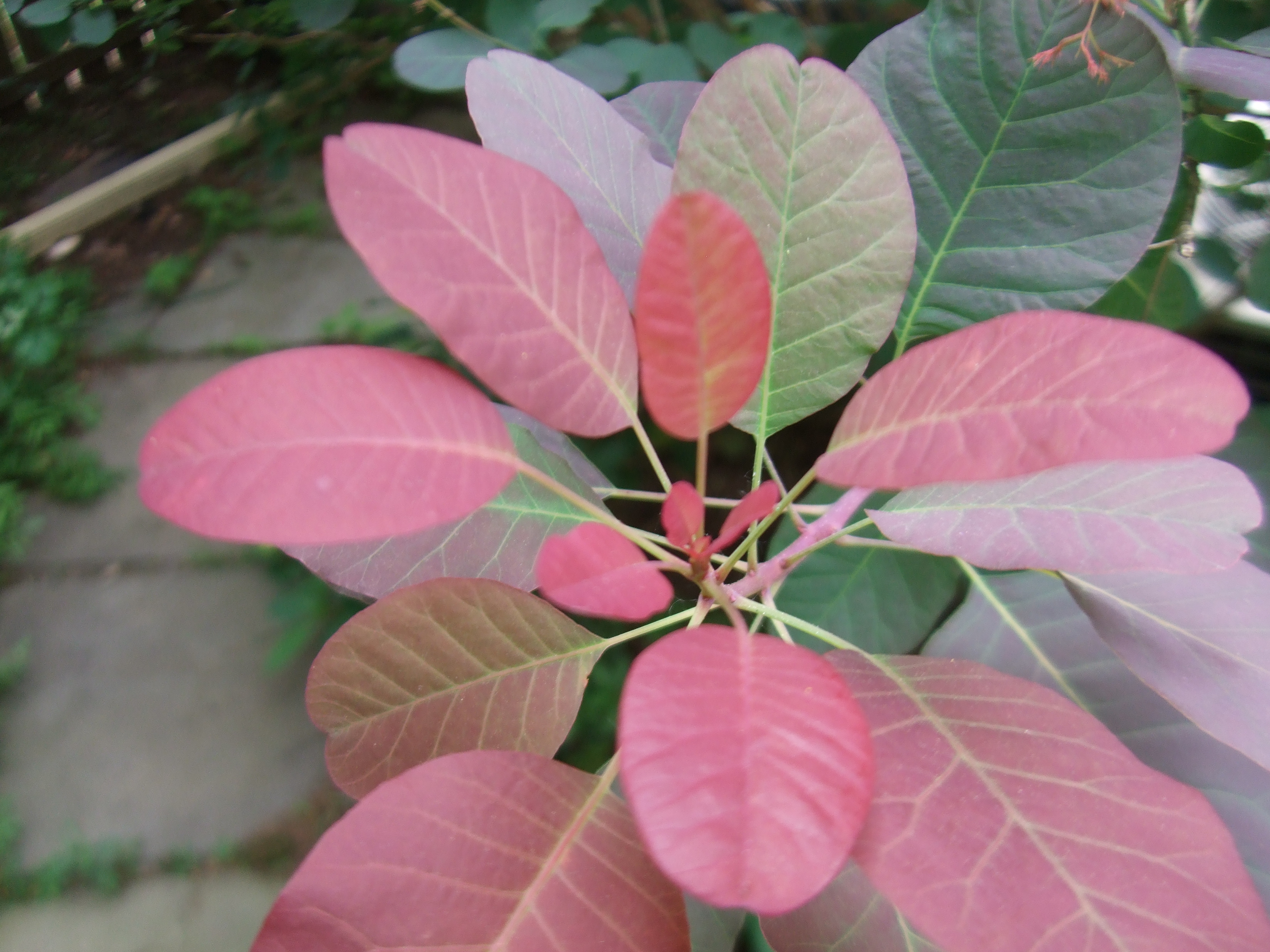
Red leaves

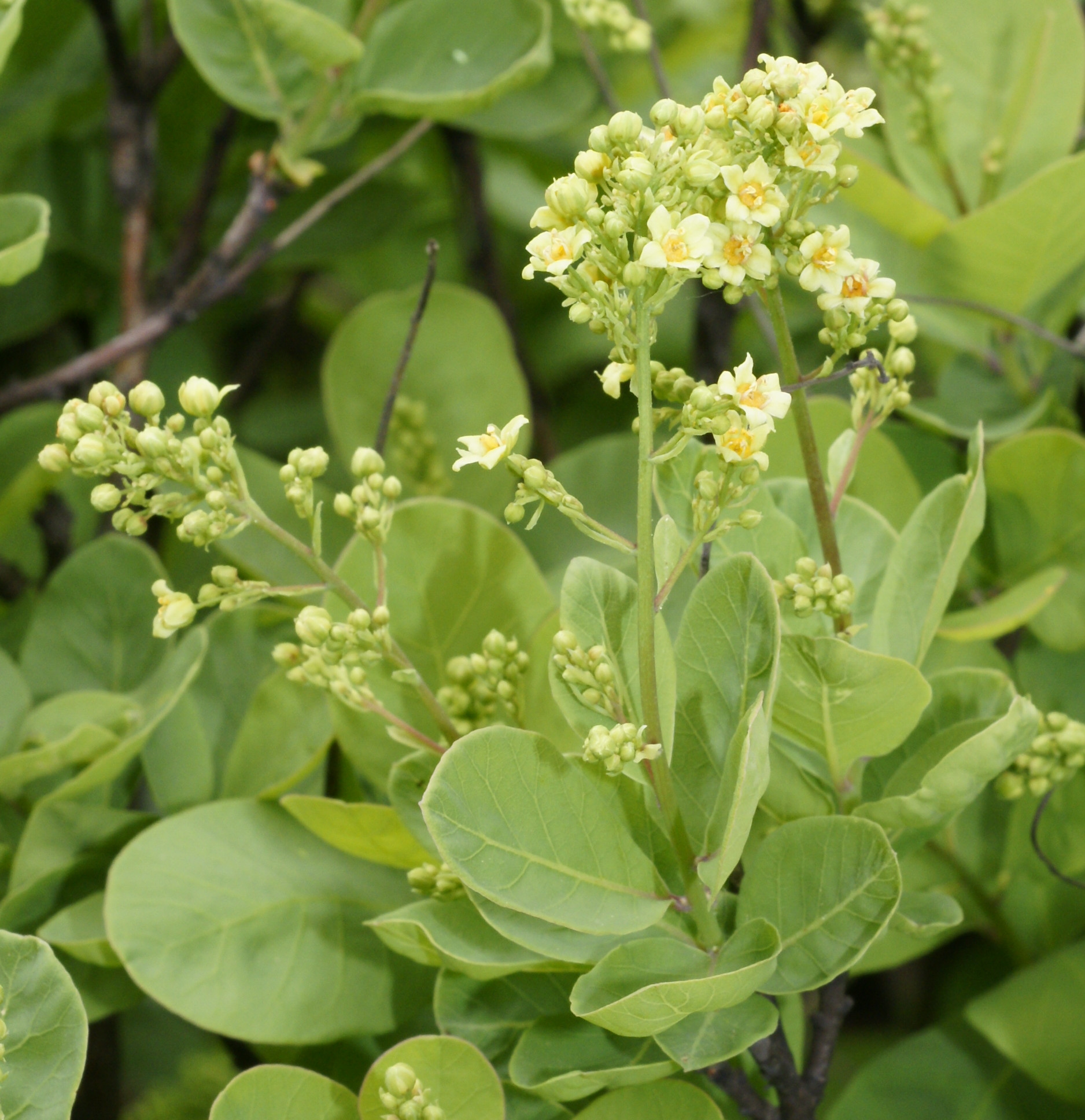
Buds and flowers

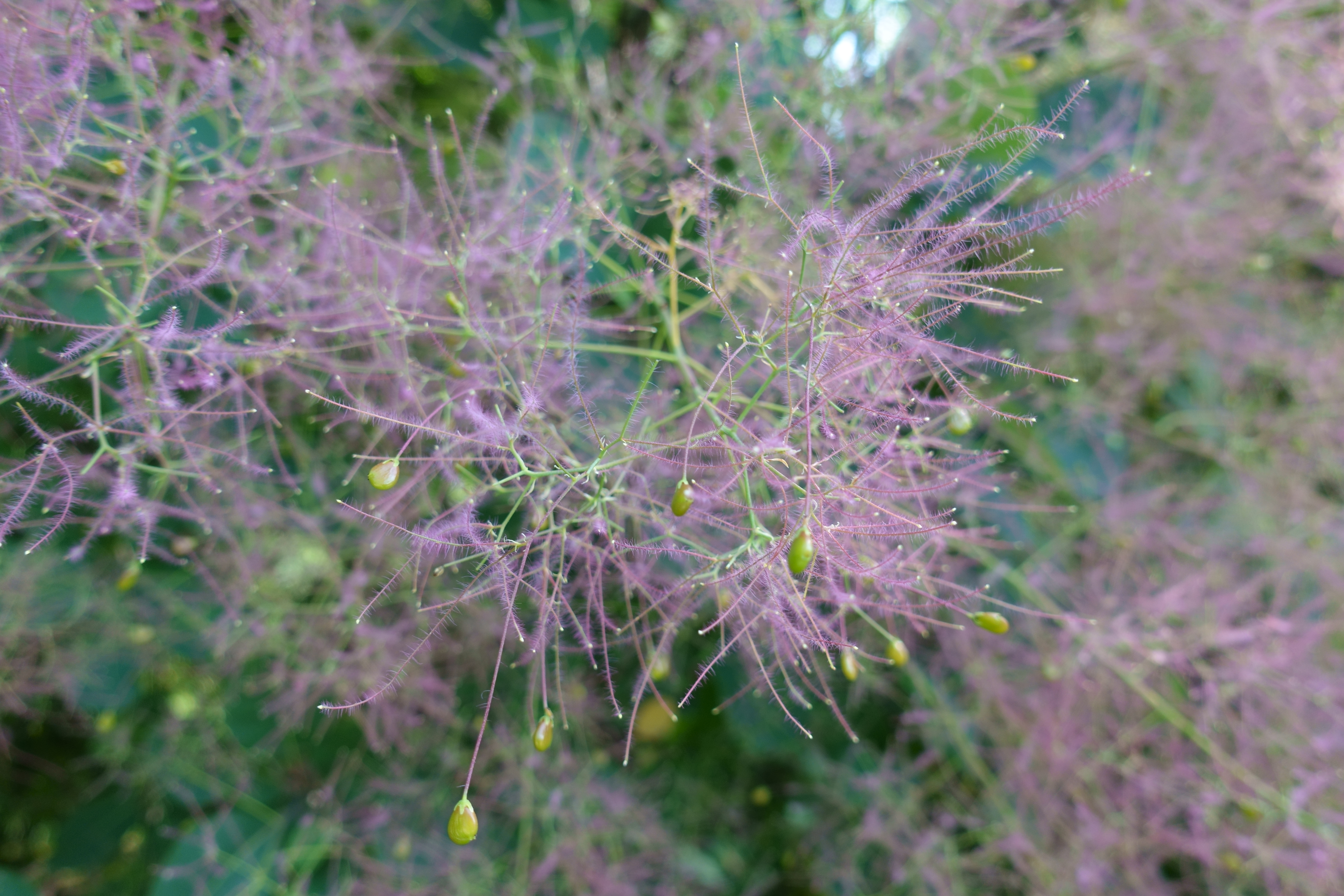
Flowers

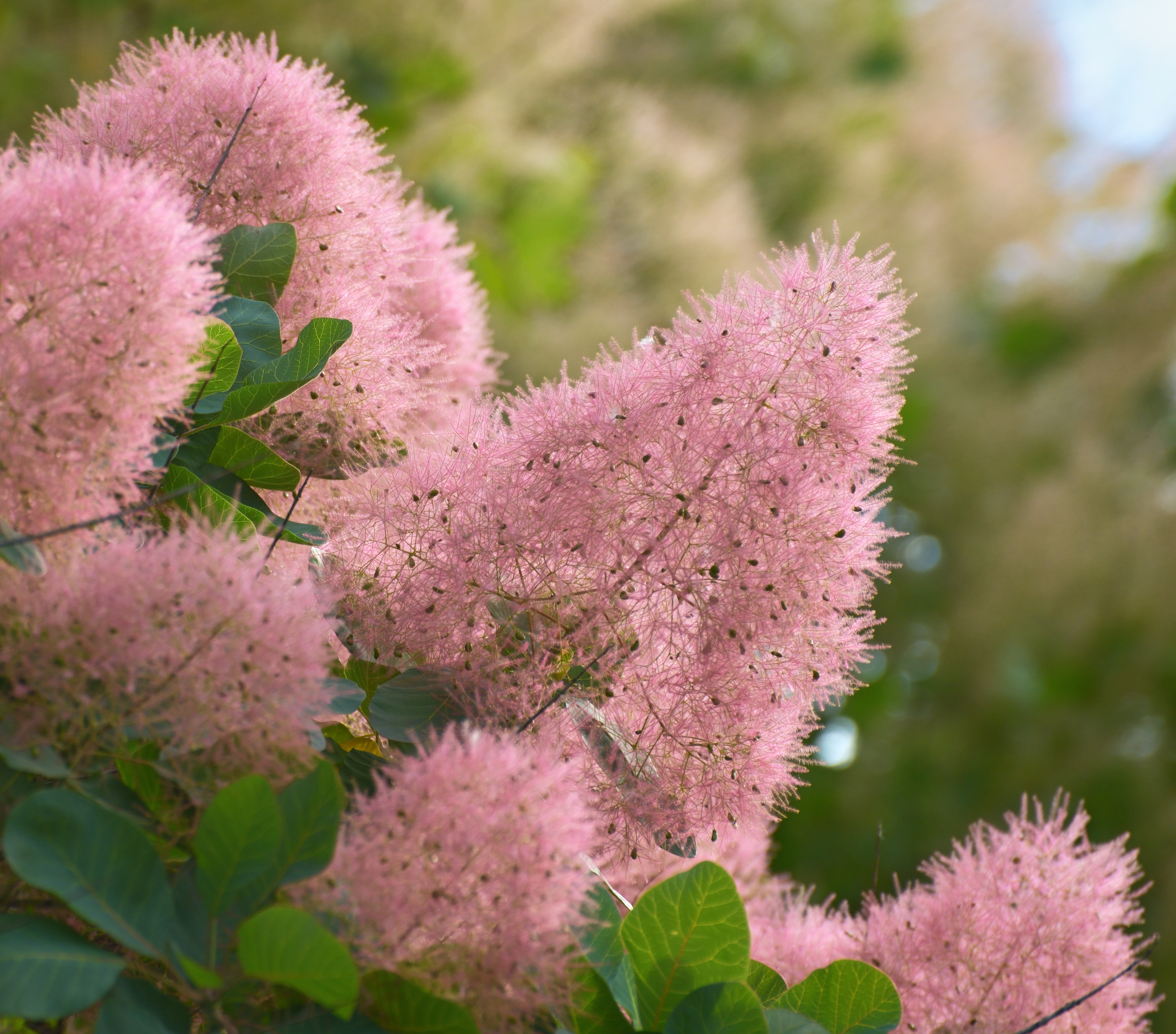
Flowers in June

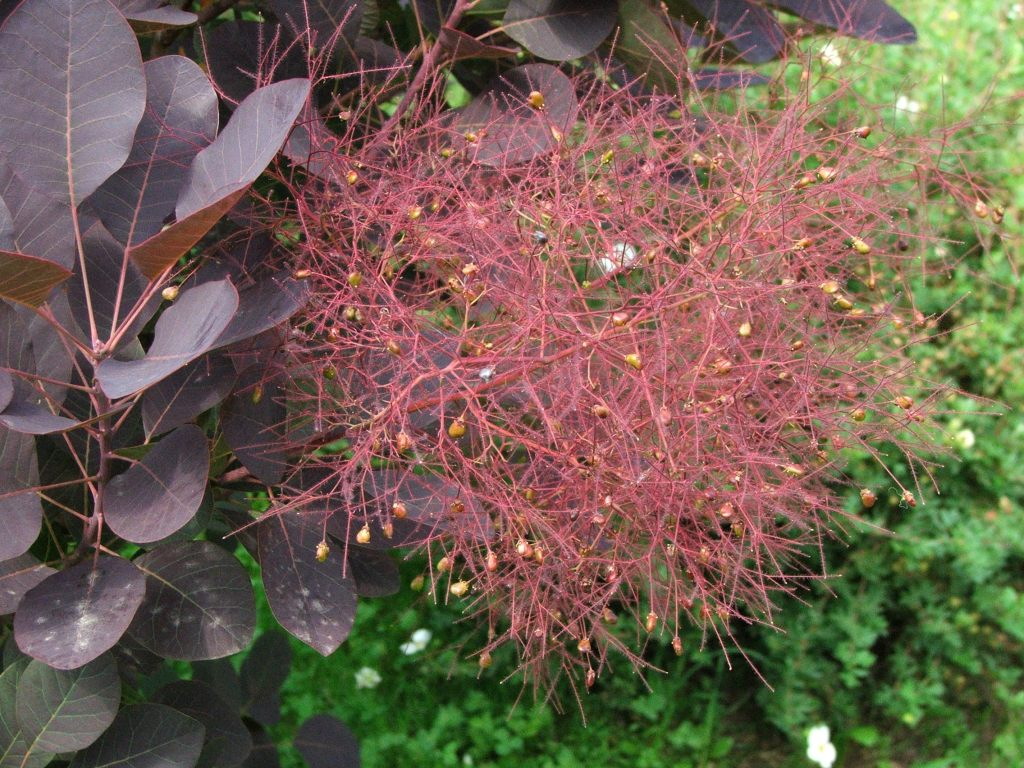
Foliage and flowers

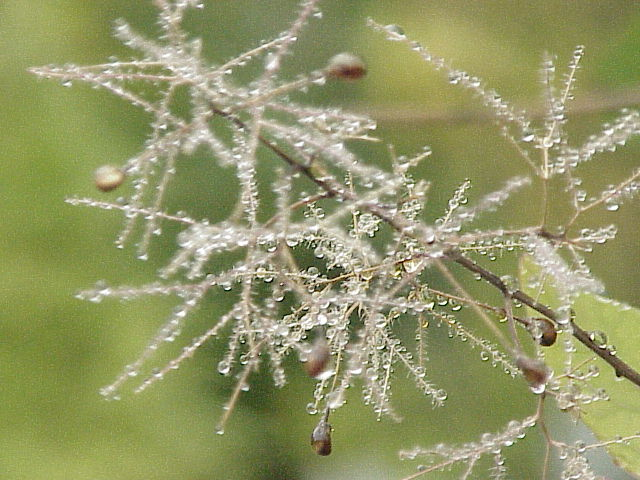
Flowers covered by water droplets

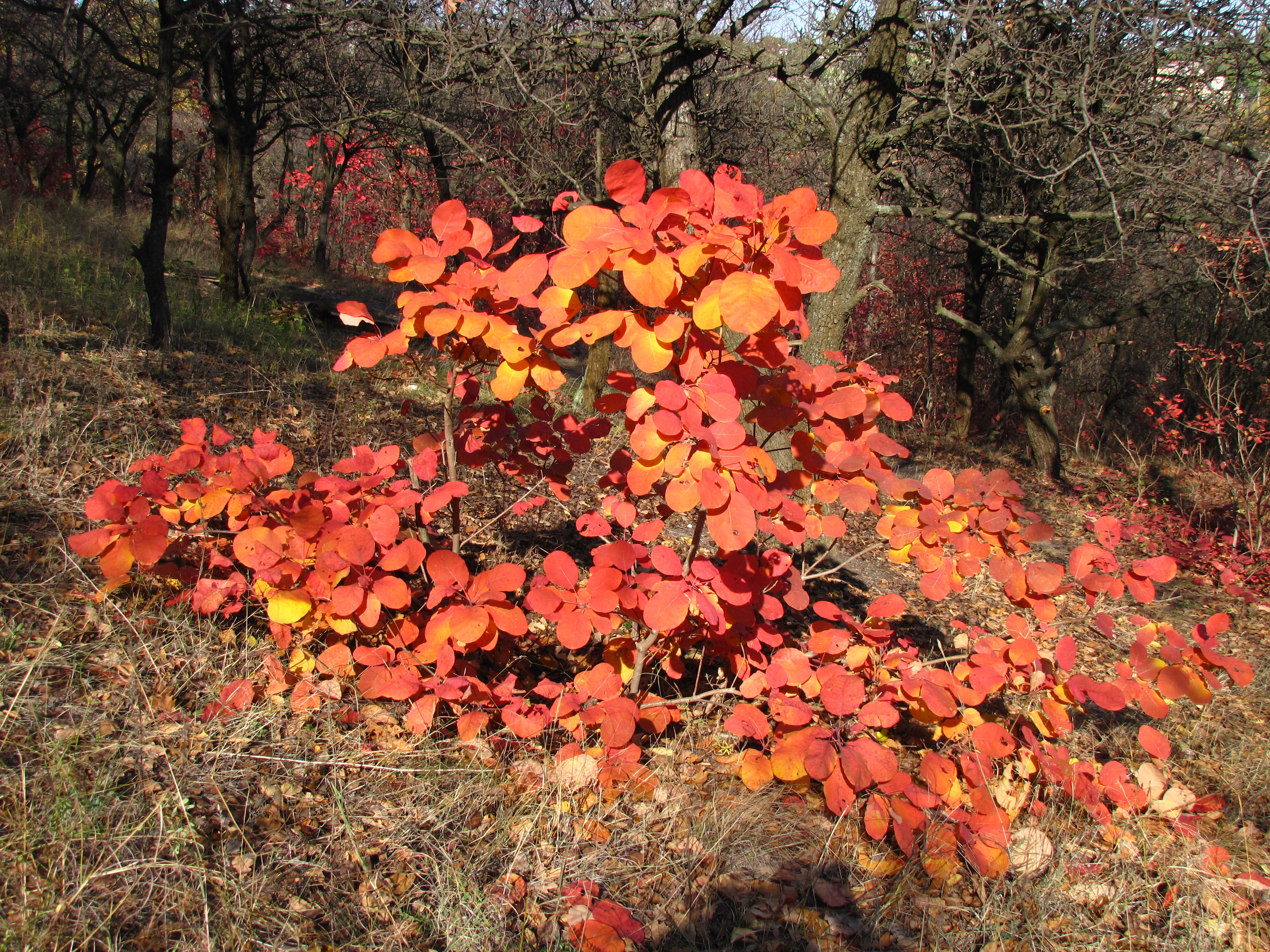
Plant in autumn

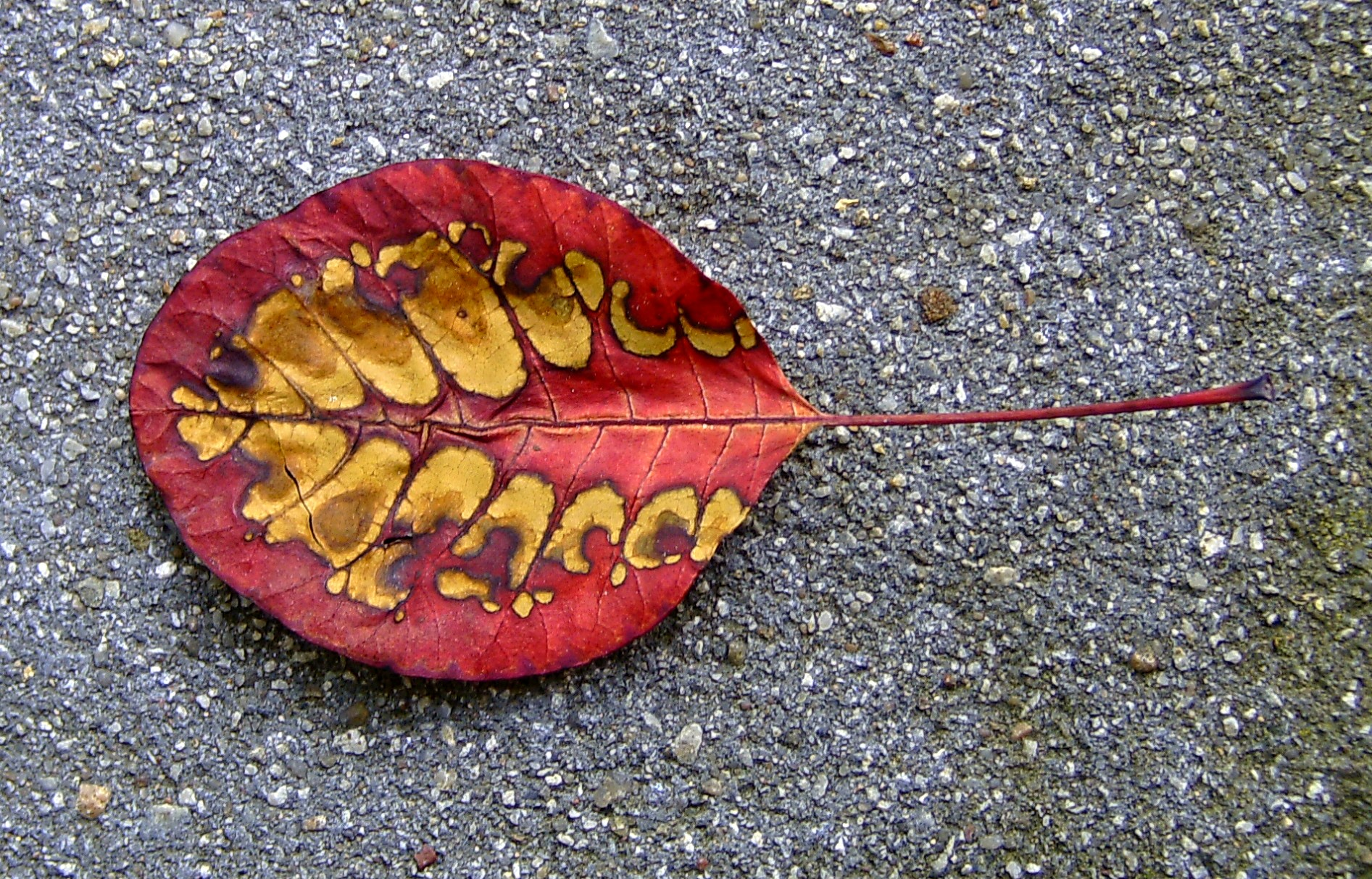
Autumn leaf

Cv. 'Daydream'
