= Fisetin =

Plant chemical

- Fisetin structure

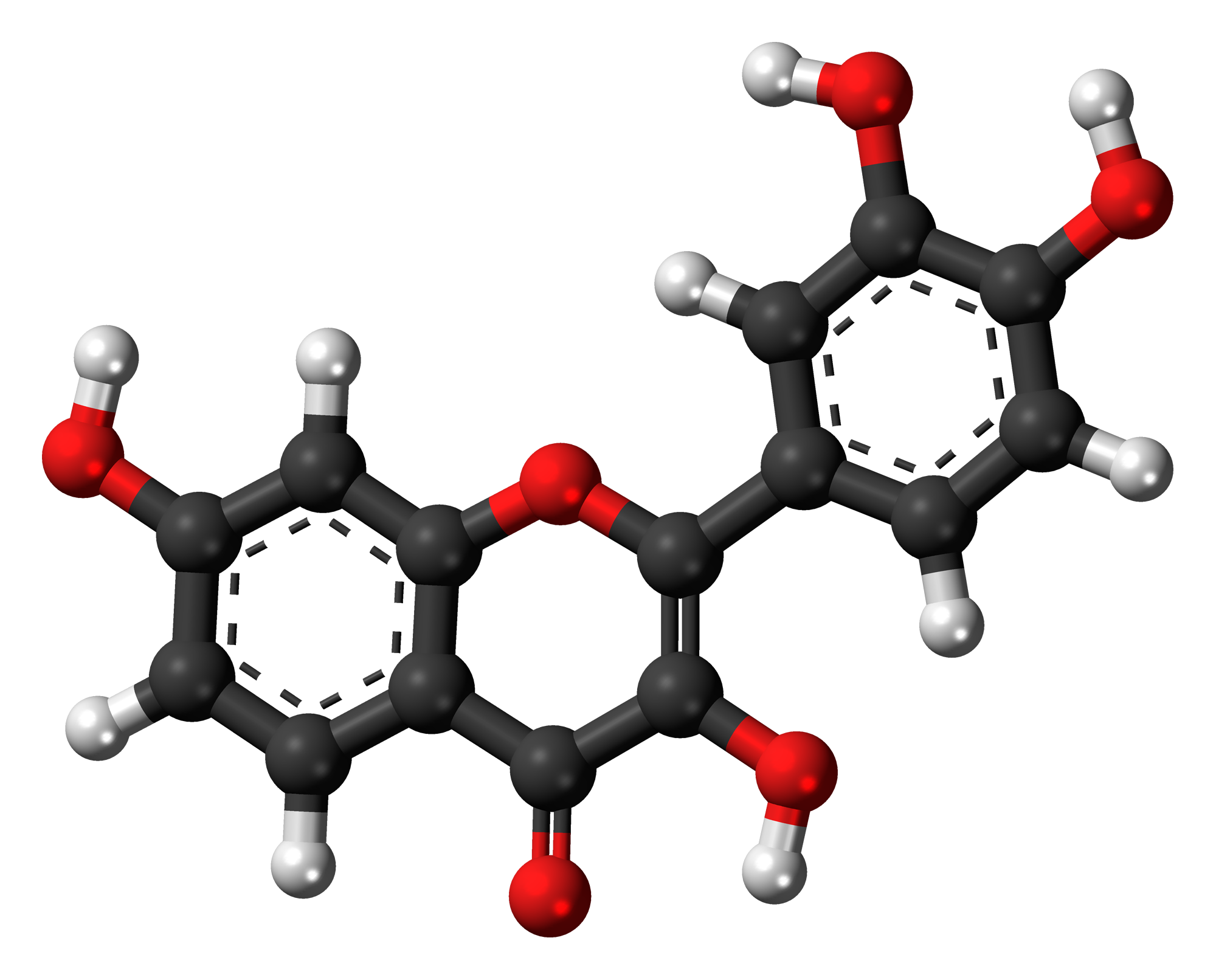

Names
- IUPAC name 3,3′,4′,7-Tetrahydroxyflavone
- Systematic IUPAC name 2-(3,4-Dihydroxyphenyl)-3,7-dihydroxy-4H-1-benzopyran-4-one
- Other names 2-(3,4-Dihydroxyphenyl)-3,7-dihydroxychromen-4-one; Cotinin (not to be confused with Cotinine); 5-Deoxyquercetin; Superfustel; Fisetholz; Fietin; Fustel; Fustet; Viset; Junger fustik

Identifiers
CAS Number	528-48-3
3D model (JSmol)	Interactive image
ChEBI	CHEBI:42567
ChEMBL	ChEMBL31574
ChemSpider	4444933
DrugBank	DB07795
ECHA InfoCard	100.007.669
IUPHAR/BPS	5182
KEGG	C10041
PubChem CID	5281614
UNII	OO2ABO9578
CompTox Dashboard (EPA)	DTXSID4022317
- InChI: InChI=1S/C15H10O6/c16-8-2-3-9-12(6-8)21-15(14(20)13(9)19)7-1-4-10(17)11(18)5-7/h1-6,16-18,20H Key: XHEFDIBZLJXQHF-UHFFFAOYSA-N
- SMILES: O=C1c3c(O/C(=C1/O)c2ccc(O)c(O)c2)cc(O)cc3

Properties
Chemical formula	C_{15}H_{10}O_{6}
Molar mass	286.2363 g/mol
Density	1.688 g/mL
Melting point	330 °C (626 °F; 603 K)
- Except where otherwise noted, data are given for materials in their standard state (at 25 °C [77 °F], 100 kPa). Infobox references

Fisetin (7,3′,4′-flavon-3-ol) is a plant flavonol from the flavonoid group of polyphenols. It occurs in many plants where it serves as a yellow pigment. It is found in many fruits and vegetables, such as strawberries, apples, persimmons, onions, and cucumbers.

Its chemical formula was first described by Austrian chemist Josef Herzig in 1891.

== Sources ==
Fisetin is a flavonoid synthesized by many plants such as the trees and shrubs of Fabaceae, acacias Acacia greggii, and Acacia berlandieri, parrot tree (Butea frondosa), honey locust (Gleditsia triacanthos), members of the family Anacardiaceae such as the Quebracho colorado, and species of the genus Rhus, which contains the sumacs. Along with myricetin, fisetin provides the color of the traditional yellow dye young fustic, an extract from the Eurasian smoketree (Rhus cotinus).

Many fruits and vegetables contain fisetin. In one study, fisetin content was highest in strawberries, with content also observed in apples, grapes, onions, tomatoes, and cucumbers. Fisetin can be extracted from fruit juices, wines, and teas. It is also present in Pinophyta species such as the yellow cypress (Callitropsis nootkatensis).

The average intake of fisetin from foods in Japan is about 0.4 mg per day.

Plant source	Amount of fisetin (μg/g)
Toxicodendron vernicifluum	15000
Strawberry	160
Apple	26
Persimmon	10.6
Onion	4.8
Lotus root	5.8
Grape	3.9
Kiwifruit	2.0
Peach	0.6
Cucumber	0.1
Tomato	0.1

== Research ==
Although fisetin has been under laboratory research over several decades for its potential role in senescence or anticancer properties, among other possible effects, there is no clinical evidence that it provides any benefit to human health, as of 2018.
