= Metkefamide =

Chemical compound

Clinical data
- ATC code: None

Pharmacokinetic data
- Bioavailability: 30-35%
- Protein binding: 44-49%
- Metabolism: Hepatic
- Elimination half-life: ~60 minutes

Identifiers
- IUPAC name: L-tyrosyl-D-alanylglycyl-L-phenylalanyl-N^{2}-methyl-L-methioninamide
- CAS Number: 66960-34-7 66960-35-8 (acetate)
- PubChem CID: 5464184
- ChemSpider: 4576570
- UNII: MNL20FXH9Y
- CompTox Dashboard (EPA): DTXSID30985694

Chemical and physical data
- Formula: C_{29}H_{40}N_{6}O_{6}S
- Molar mass: 600.74 g·mol^{−1}
- 3D model (JSmol): Interactive image
- SMILES: O=C(N)[C@@H](N(C(=O)[C@@H](NC(=O)CNC(=O)[C@H](NC(=O)[C@@H](N)Cc1ccc(O)cc1)C)Cc2ccccc2)C)CCSC
- InChI: InChI=1S/C29H40N6O6S/c1-18(33-28(40)22(30)15-20-9-11-21(36)12-10-20)27(39)32-17-25(37)34-23(16-19-7-5-4-6-8-19)29(41)35(2)24(26(31)38)13-14-42-3/h4-12,18,22-24,36H,13-17,30H2,1-3H3,(H2,31,38)(H,32,39)(H,33,40)(H,34,37)/t18-,22+,23+,24+/m1/s1; Key:FWDIKROEWJOQIQ-JMBSJVKXSA-N

Metkefamide (INN; LY-127,623), or metkephamid acetate (USAN), but most frequently referred to simply as metkephamid, is a synthetic opioid pentapeptide and derivative of [Met]enkephalin with the amino acid sequence Tyr-D-Ala-Gly-Phe-(N-Me)-Met-NH_{2}. It behaves as a potent agonist of the δ- and μ-opioid receptors with roughly equipotent affinity, and also has similarly high affinity as well as subtype-selectivity for the κ_{3}-opioid receptor.

Despite its peptidic nature, upon systemic administration, metkefamide rapidly penetrates the blood-brain-barrier and disperses into the central nervous system where it produces potent, centrally-mediated analgesic effects which have been shown to be dependent on activity at both the μ- and δ-opioid receptors. In addition, on account of modifications to the N- and C-terminals, metkefamide is highly stable against proteolytic degradation relative to many other opioid peptides. As an example, while its parent peptide, [Met]enkephalin, has an in vivo half-life of merely seconds, metkefamide has a half-life of nearly 60 minutes, and upon intramuscular administration, has been shown to provide pain relief that lasts for hours.

Likely on account of its δ-opioid activity, clinical trials have found metkefamide to possess less of a tendency for producing many of the undesirable side effects usually associated with conventional opioids such as respiratory depression, tolerance, and physical dependence. However, it has been shown to cause some additional side effects that are considered unusual for standard opioid analgesics, like sensations of heaviness in the extremities and nasal congestion—though these were not considered to be particularly distressing—and it has also been shown to raise the seizure threshold in animals. In any case, clinical development was not further pursued after phase I clinical studies and metkefamide never reached the pharmaceutical market.

== See also ==
- [Met]Enkephalin
- Frakefamide
