= Flavonols =

Class of plant and fungus secondary metabolites

Backbone of a flavonol, substituent numbers are indicated.

Flavonols are a class of flavonoids that have the 3-hydroxyflavone backbone (IUPAC name: 3-hydroxy-2-phenylchromen-4-one). Their diversity stems from the different positions of the phenolic –OH groups. They are distinct from flavanols (with "a") such as catechin, another class of flavonoids, and an unrelated group of metabolically important molecules, the flavins (with "i"), derived from the yellow B vitamin riboflavin.

Flavonols are present in a wide variety of fruits and vegetables. In Western populations, estimated daily intake is in the range of 20–50 mg per day for flavonols. Individual intake varies depending on the type of diet consumed.

The phenomenon of dual fluorescence (due to excited state intramolecular proton transfer or ESIPT) is induced by tautomerism of flavonols (and glucosides) and could contribute to plant UV protection and flower colour. Flavonol aglycones in plants are antioxidants that serve to protect the plant from reactive oxygen species.

== Flavonols ==
Flavonols
Name	IUPAC name	5	6	7	8	2′	3′	4′	5′	6′
3-Hydroxyflavone	3-hydroxy-2-phenylchromen-4-one	H	H	H	H	H	H	H	H	H
Azaleatin	2-(3,4-dihydroxyphenyl)-3,7-dihydroxy-5-methoxychromen-4-one	OCH_{3}	H	OH	H	H	H	OH	OH	H
Fisetin	3,3′,4′,7-tetrahydroxy-2-phenylchromen-4-one	H	H	OH	H	H	OH	OH	H	H
Galangin	3,5,7-trihydroxy-2-phenylchromen-4-one	OH	H	OH	H	H	H	H	H	H
Gossypetin	2-(3,4-dihydroxyphenyl)-3,5,7,8-tetrahydroxychromen-4-one	OH	H	OH	OH	H	OH	OH	H	H
Kaempferide	3,5,7-trihydroxy-2-(4-methoxyphenyl)chromen-4-one	OH	H	OH	H	H	H	OCH_{3}	H	H
Kaempferol	3,4′,5,7-tetrahydroxy-2-phenylchromen-4-one	OH	H	OH	H	H	H	OH	H	H
Isorhamnetin	3,5,7-trihydroxy-2-(4-hydroxy-3-methoxyphenyl)chromen-4-one	OH	H	OH	H	H	OCH_{3}	OH	H	H
Morin	2-(2,4-dihydroxyphenyl)-3,5,7-trihydroxychromen-4-one	OH	H	OH	H	OH	H	OH	H	H
Myricetin	3,3′,4′,5′,5,7-hexahydroxy-2-phenylchromen-4-one	OH	H	OH	H	H	OH	OH	OH	H
Natsudaidain	2-(3,4-dimethoxyphenyl)-3-hydroxy-5,6,7,8-tetramethoxychromen-4-one	OCH_{3}	OCH_{3}	OCH_{3}	OCH_{3}	H	H	OCH_{3}	OCH_{3}	H
Pachypodol	5-hydroxy-2-(4-hydroxy-3-methoxyphenyl)-3,7-dimethoxychromen-4-one	OH	H	OCH_{3}	H	H	OCH_{3}	OH	H	H
Quercetin	3,3′,4′,5,7-pentahydroxy-2-phenylchromen-4-one	OH	H	OH	H	H	OH	OH	H	H
Rhamnazin	3,5-dihydroxy-2-(4-hydroxy-3-methoxyphenyl)-7-methoxychromen-4-one	OH	H	OCH_{3}	H	H	OCH_{3}	OH	H	H
Rhamnetin	2-(3,4-dihydroxyphenyl)-3,5-dihydroxy-7-methoxychromen-4-one	OH	H	OCH_{3}	H	H	OH	OH	H	H

== Flavonol glycosides ==
Flavonols glycosides and acetylated glycosides
Name	Aglycone	3	5	6	7	8	2′	3′	4′	5′	6′
Astragalin	Kaempferol	Glc									
Azalein	Azaleatin	Rha									
Hyperoside	Quercetin	Gal									
Isoquercitin	Quercetin	Glc									
Kaempferitrin	Kaempferol	Rha			Rha						
Myricitrin	Myricetin	Rha									
Quercitrin	Quercetin	Rha									
Robinin	Kaempferol	Robinose			Rha						
Rutin	Quercetin	Rutinose									
Spiraeoside	Quercetin								Glc		
Xanthorhamnin	Rhamnetin	trisaccharide									
Amurensin	Kaempferol				Glc	tert-amyl					
Icariin	Kaempferide	Rha			Glc	tert-amyl					
Troxerutin	Quercetin	Rutinose			hydroxyethyl			hydroxyethyl	hydroxyethyl		

== Drug interactions ==
Flavonols inhibit CYP2C9 and CYP3A4, which are cytochrome P450 enzymes affecting drug metabolism.

== See also ==
- Phenolic compounds in wine
- Algar–Flynn–Oyamada reaction
