= 3-Hydroxyflavone =

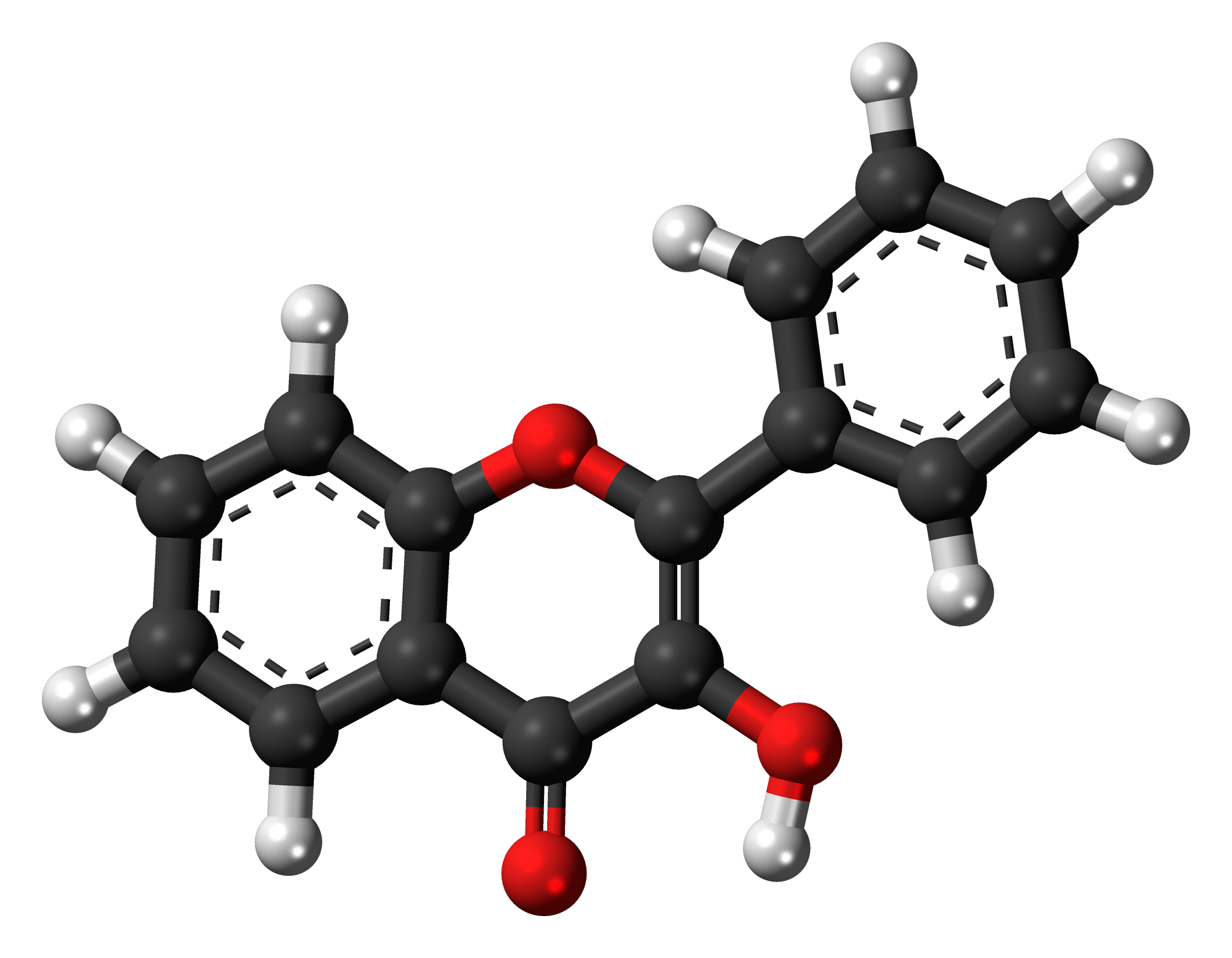

Names
- IUPAC name 3-Hydroxyflavone
- Systematic IUPAC name 3-Hydroxy-2-phenyl-4H-1-benzopyran-4-one
- Other names Flavon-3-ol; 3-HF; 3-Hydroxy-2-phenylchromone

Identifiers
CAS Number	577-85-5
3D model (JSmol)	Interactive image
ChEBI	CHEBI:5078
ChEMBL	ChEMBL294009
ChemSpider	10871
ECHA InfoCard	100.008.562
KEGG	C01495
PubChem CID	11349
UNII	ZTG9LSS5QH
CompTox Dashboard (EPA)	DTXSID4060365
- InChI: InChI=1S/C15H10O3/c16-13-11-8-4-5-9-12(11)18-15(14(13)17)10-6-2-1-3-7-10/h1-9,17H Key: HVQAJTFOCKOKIN-UHFFFAOYSA-N; InChI=1/C15H10O3/c16-13-11-8-4-5-9-12(11)18-15(14(13)17)10-6-2-1-3-7-10/h1-9,17H Key: HVQAJTFOCKOKIN-UHFFFAOYAX
- SMILES: O=C1c3c(O/C(=C1/O)c2ccccc2)cccc3

Properties
Chemical formula	C_{15}H_{10}O_{3}
Molar mass	238.23 g/mol
Density	1.367 g/mL
- Except where otherwise noted, data are given for materials in their standard state (at 25 °C [77 °F], 100 kPa). verify (what is ?) Infobox references

3-Hydroxyflavone is a chemical compound. It is the backbone of all flavonols, a type of flavonoid. It is a synthetic compound, which is not found naturally in plants. It serves as a model molecule as it possesses an excited-state intramolecular proton transfer (ESIPT) effect to serve as a fluorescent probe to study membranes for example or intermembrane proteins. The green tautomer emission (λ_{max} ≈ 524 nm) and blue-violet normal emission (λ_{max} ≈ 400 nm) originate from two different ground state populations of 3HF molecules. The phenomenon also exists in natural flavonols. Although 3-hydroxyflavone is almost insoluble in water, its aqueous solubility (hence bio-availability) can be increased by encapsulation in cyclodextrin cavities.

== Synthesis ==
The Algar-Flynn-Oyamada reaction is a chemical reaction whereby a chalcone undergoes an oxidative cyclization to form a flavonol.

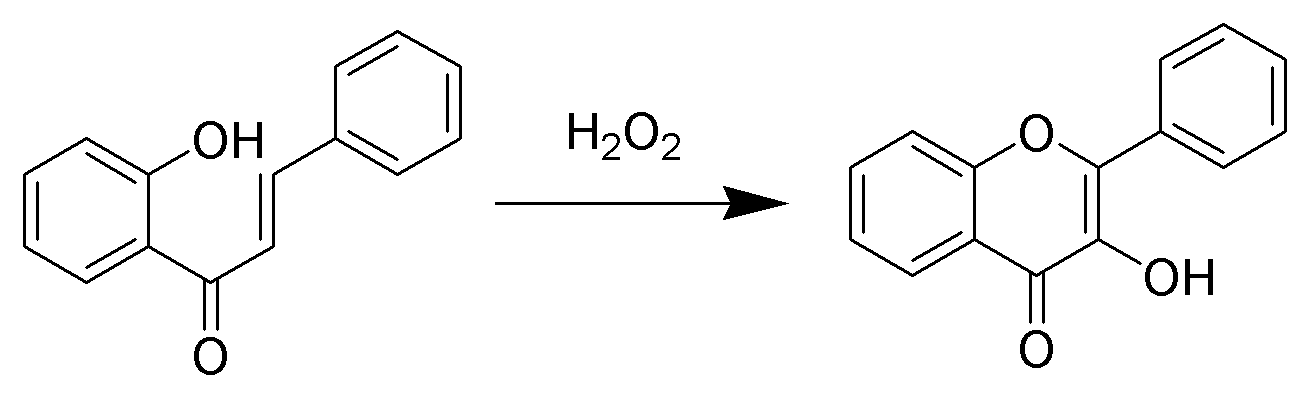
Algar-Flynn-Oyamada reaction
