= Cucurbalsaminol A =

Names
- IUPAC name (23E)-9-Methyl-19-nor-9β,10α-lanosta-5,23-diene-3β,7β,12β,25-tetrol
- Systematic IUPAC name (1R,3aS,3bR,4S,7S,9aS,9bS,11R,11aR)-1-[(2R,4E)-6-Hydroxy-6-methylhept-4-en-2-yl]-3a,6,6,9b,11a-pentamethyl-2,3,3a,3b,4,6,7,8,9,9a,9b,10,11,11a-tetradecahydro-1H-cyclopenta[a]phenanthrene-4,7,11-triol
- Other names Cucurbita-(5,23E)-diene-3β,12β,25-triol; (3β,7β,9β,10α,12β,23E)-4,4,9,14-tetramethyl-19-norcholesta-5,23-diene-3,7,12,23-diol

Identifiers
CAS Number	1189131-54-1
3D model (JSmol)	Interactive image
ChEMBL	ChEMBL1077876
ChemSpider	24531940
PubChem CID	44607278
UNII	DK3RVK3UAD
CompTox Dashboard (EPA)	DTXSID50659648
- InChI: InChI=1S/C30H50O4/c1-18(10-9-14-26(2,3)34)19-13-15-29(7)25-22(31)16-21-20(11-12-23(32)27(21,4)5)28(25,6)17-24(33)30(19,29)8/h9,14,16,18-20,22-25,31-34H,10-13,15,17H2,1-8H3/b14-9+/t18-,19-,20-,22+,23+,24-,25-,28+,29+,30+/m1/s1 Key: WFULNIMUTJQIKF-HCLZVIJHSA-N
- SMILES: C[C@H](C/C=C/C(O)(C)C)[C@@]1([H])CC[C@@]2(C)[C@]3([H])[C@@H](O)C=C4C(C)(C)[C@@H](O)CC[C@@]4([H])[C@]3(C)C[C@@H](O)[C@@]21C

Properties
Chemical formula	C_{30}H_{50}O_{4}
Molar mass	474.726 g·mol^{−1}
- Except where otherwise noted, data are given for materials in their standard state (at 25 °C [77 °F], 100 kPa). verify (what is ?) Infobox references

Cucurbalsaminol A or cucurbita-5,23(E)-diene-3β,12β,25-triol, is a chemical compound with formula C_{30}H_{50}O_{4}, found in the Balsam apple vine (Momordica balsamina). It is a cucurbitane-type triterpenoid, related to cucurbitacin, isolated by C. Ramalhete and others in 2009.

Cucurbalsaminol A is an amorphous powder soluble in methanol and ethyl acetate but insoluble in n-hexane. Unlike Cucurbalsaminol B, it is not cytotoxic.

== See also ==
- Balsaminapentaol
- Balsaminol A
- Balsaminol B
- Cucurbalsaminol B
- Karavilagenin E
