= Balsaminol B =

Names
- IUPAC name (23R)-7β-Methoxy-9-methyl-19-nor-9β,10α-lanosta-5,24-diene-3β,23,29-triol
- Systematic IUPAC name (1R,3aS,3bR,4S,6S,7S,9aS,9bS,11aR)-6-(Hydroxymethyl)-1-[(2R,4R)-4-hydroxy-6-methylhept-5-en-2-yl]-4-methoxy-3a,6,9b,11a-tetramethyl-2,3,3a,3b,4,6,7,8,9,9a,9b,10,11,11a-tetradecahydro-1H-cyclopenta[a]phenanthren-7-ol
- Other names 7β-Methoxycucurbita-5,24-diene-3β,23(R),29-triol; (3β,4β,7β,9β,10α,23R)-4-(Hydroxymethyl)-7-methoxy-4,9,14-trimethyl-19-norcholesta-5,24-diene-3,23-diol

Identifiers
CAS Number	1189131-53-0
3D model (JSmol)	Interactive image
ChEMBL	ChEMBL1078437
ChemSpider	24676126
PubChem CID	44607277
UNII	7DPG7ZT7JE
CompTox Dashboard (EPA)	DTXSID90659647
- InChI: InChI=1S/C31H52O4/c1-19(2)15-21(33)16-20(3)22-11-12-31(7)27-25(35-8)17-24-23(9-10-26(34)29(24,5)18-32)28(27,4)13-14-30(22,31)6/h15,17,20-23,25-27,32-34H,9-14,16,18H2,1-8H3/t20-,21+,22-,23-,25+,26+,27-,28+,29-,30-,31+/m1/s1 Key: XIQPIAMRFKEZPL-IQOYCCEYSA-N
- SMILES: C[C@H](C[C@@H](O)/C=C(C)/C)[C@@]1([H])CC[C@@]2(C)[C@]3([H])[C@@H](OC)C=C4[C@@](C)(CO)[C@@H](O)CC[C@@]4([H])[C@]3(C)CC[C@@]21C

Properties
Chemical formula	C_{31}H_{52}O_{4}
Molar mass	488.753 g·mol^{−1}
- Except where otherwise noted, data are given for materials in their standard state (at 25 °C [77 °F], 100 kPa). verify (what is ?) Infobox references

Balsaminol B or 7β-methoxycucurbita-5,24-diene-3β,23(R),29-triol, is a chemical compound with formula C_{31}H_{52}O_{4}, found in the balsam apple vine (Momordica balsamina). It is a cucurbitane-type triterpenoid, related to cucurbitacin, isolated by C. Ramalhete and others in 2009.

Balsaminol B is an amorphous powder soluble in methanol and ethyl acetate, but insoluble in n-hexane. It is cytotoxic at about 50 μM.

== See also ==
- Balsaminapentaol
- Balsaminol A
- Cucurbalsaminol A
- Cucurbalsaminol B
- Karavilagenin E
