= Rhamnetin =

- Rhamnetin structure

Names
- IUPAC name 3,3′,4′,5-Tetrahydroxy-7-methoxyflavone
- Systematic IUPAC name 2-(3,4-Dihydroxyphenyl)-3,5-dihydroxy-7-methoxy-4H-1-benzopyran-4-one
- Other names 7-Methylquercetin; 7-Methoxyquercetin; 7-O-Methylquercetin β-Rhamnocitrin; Quercetin 7-methyl ether

Identifiers
| CAS Number | 90-19-7 |
| 3D model (JSmol) | Interactive image |
| ChEBI | CHEBI:74992 |
| ChemSpider | 4445008 |
| ECHA InfoCard | 100.001.795 |
| EC Number | 201-974-1 |
| KEGG | C10176 |
| PubChem CID | 5281691 |
| UNII | 71803L5F4S |
| CompTox Dashboard (EPA) | DTXSID40237979 |
- InChI: InChI=1S/C16H12O7/c1-22-8-5-11(19)13-12(6-8)23-16(15(21)14(13)20)7-2-3-9(17)10(18)4-7/h2-6,17-19,21H,1H3 Key: JGUZGNYPMHHYRK-UHFFFAOYSA-N; InChI=1/C16H12O7/c1-22-8-5-11(19)13-12(6-8)23-16(15(21)14(13)20)7-2-3-9(17)10(18)4-7/h2-6,17-19,21H,1H3 Key: JGUZGNYPMHHYRK-UHFFFAOYAY
- SMILES: COC1=CC(=C2C(=C1)OC(=C(C2=O)O)C3=CC(=C(C=C3)O)O)O

Properties
| Chemical formula | C_{16}H_{12}O_{7} |
| Molar mass | 316.26 g/mol |
- Except where otherwise noted, data are given for materials in their standard state (at 25 °C [77 °F], 100 kPa). verify (what is ?) Infobox references

Rhamnetin is an O-methylated flavonoid, a type of chemical compound. It can be isolated from cloves.

The structure of the molecule was discovered by Austrian chemist Josef Herzig (1853–1924).

== Glycosides ==
Rhamnetin is the aglycone of xanthorhamnin.
