= Robinose =

Names
- IUPAC name 6-O-(6-deoxy-α-L-mannopyranosyl)-β-D-galactopyranose
- Other names Robinobiose

Identifiers
CAS Number	552-74-9
3D model (JSmol)	Interactive image
ChemSpider	390161
PubChem CID	441428
CompTox Dashboard (EPA)	DTXSID101028806
- InChI: InChI=1S/C12H22O10/c1-3-5(13)7(15)10(18)12(21-3)20-2-4-6(14)8(16)9(17)11(19)22-4/h3-19H,2H2,1H3/t3-,4+,5-,6-,7+,8-,9+,10+,11+,12+/m0/s1 Key: OVVGHDNPYGTYIT-PEPLWKDOSA-N; InChI=1/C12H22O10/c1-3-5(13)7(15)10(18)12(21-3)20-2-4-6(14)8(16)9(17)11(19)22-4/h3-19H,2H2,1H3/t3-,4+,5-,6-,7+,8-,9+,10+,11+,12+/m0/s1 Key: OVVGHDNPYGTYIT-PEPLWKDOBI
- SMILES: O(C[C@H]1O[C@@H](O)[C@H](O)[C@@H](O)[C@H]1O)[C@@H]2O[C@H]([C@H](O)[C@@H](O)[C@H]2O)C

Properties
Chemical formula	C_{12}H_{22}O_{10}
Molar mass	326.298 g·mol^{−1}
- Except where otherwise noted, data are given for materials in their standard state (at 25 °C [77 °F], 100 kPa). Infobox references

Robinose is a disaccharide composed of 6″-O-α-rhamnopyranosyl-β-galactopyranoside. The sugar can be found in Acalypha hispida.

Robinin is a kaempferol-3-O-robinoside-7-O-rhamnoside.
