= Robinin =

- Robinin structure

Names
- IUPAC name 4′,5-Dihydroxy-3-[α-L-rhamnopyranosyl-(1→6)-β-D-galactopyranosyloxy]-7-(α-L-rhamnopyranosyloxy)flavone
- Systematic IUPAC name (1^{2}S,1^{3}R,1^{4}R,1^{5}R,1^{6}S,5^{2}S,5^{3}R,5^{4}S,5^{5}R,5^{6}R,8^{2}R,8^{3}R,8^{4}R,8^{5}R,8^{6}S)-1^{3},1^{4},1^{5},3^{5},5^{3},5^{4},5^{5},8^{3},8^{4},8^{5}-Decahydroxy-3^{2}-(4-hydroxyphenyl)-1^{6},8^{6}-dimethyl-3^{4}H-2,4,7-trioxa-3(7,3)-[1]benzopyrana-1,8(2),5(2,6)-tris(oxana)octaphan-3^{4}-one
- Other names Kaempferol-3-O-gal-rham-7-O-rham; Kaempferol-3-O-robinoside-7-O-rhamnoside; Kaempferol robinoside

Identifiers
CAS Number	301-19-9
3D model (JSmol)	Interactive image
ChEBI	CHEBI:8878
ChemSpider	4445010
ECHA InfoCard	100.005.559
EC Number	206-113-3
KEGG	C10178
PubChem CID	5281693
UNII	75RT1VGM60
- InChI: InChI=1S/C33H40O19/c1-10-19(36)23(40)26(43)31(47-10)46-9-17-21(38)25(42)28(45)33(51-17)52-30-22(39)18-15(35)7-14(49-32-27(44)24(41)20(37)11(2)48-32)8-16(18)50-29(30)12-3-5-13(34)6-4-12/h3-8,10-11,17,19-21,23-28,31-38,40-45H,9H2,1-2H3/t10-,11-,17+,19-,20-,21-,23+,24+,25-,26+,27+,28+,31+,32-,33-/m0/s1 Key: PEFASEPMJYRQBW-HKWQTAEVSA-N; InChI=1/C33H40O19/c1-10-19(36)23(40)26(43)31(47-10)46-9-17-21(38)25(42)28(45)33(51-17)52-30-22(39)18-15(35)7-14(49-32-27(44)24(41)20(37)11(2)48-32)8-16(18)50-29(30)12-3-5-13(34)6-4-12/h3-8,10-11,17,19-21,23-28,31-38,40-45H,9H2,1-2H3/t10-,11-,17+,19-,20-,21-,23+,24+,25-,26+,27+,28+,31+,32-,33-/m0/s1 Key: PEFASEPMJYRQBW-HKWQTAEVBB
- SMILES: C[C@H]1[C@@H]([C@H]([C@H]([C@@H](O1)OC[C@@H]2[C@@H]([C@@H]([C@H]([C@@H](O2)OC3=C(OC4=CC(=CC(=C4C3=O)O)O[C@H]5[C@@H]([C@@H]([C@H]([C@@H](O5)C)O)O)O)C6=CC=C(C=C6)O)O)O)O)O)O)O

Properties
Chemical formula	C_{33}H_{40}O_{19}
Molar mass	740.66 g/mol
- Except where otherwise noted, data are given for materials in their standard state (at 25 °C [77 °F], 100 kPa). verify (what is ?) Infobox references

Robinin (IUPAC: kaempferol-3-O-(6-deoxy-α-L-mannopyranosyl)-β-D-galactopyranoside-7-O-(6-deoxy-α-L-mannopyranosyl)oxy) is a naturally occurring flavonoid glycoside, classified as a flavonol O-glycoside. or from the common locust Robinia pseudoacacia. It is chemically derived as a flavone glycoside from the aglycone Kaempferol, and occurs naturally in several plant species.

Robinin is found in plants of the family Fabaceae, particularly in the genus Robinia, such as Robinia pseudoacacia (black locust or robinia). It has also been reported in other genera, including Vigna and Pueraria.

== Chemical properties ==
Robinin has the molecular formula C_{33}H_{40}O_{19} and a molecular weight of 740.66 g/mol.

It is a diglycoside of kaempferol, with sugar moieties attached at the -3 and -7 positions of the flavonol skeleton. These sugars include rhamnose and galactose residues linked through glycosidic bonds.

== Biological activities and applications ==
Preliminary research suggests that robinin exhibits anti-inflammatory, antibacterial, and cardioprotective properties. It has been reported to inhibit the TLR4/NF-κB signaling pathway in human peripheral blood mononuclear cells and to reduce cardiotoxicity in animal models.

While robinin has demonstrated bioactivity in laboratory studies, it currently has no approved therapeutic or pharmacological use in humans.

== See also ==
- Flavonoid glycoside
- Kaempferol
- Robinose
