= Casokefamide =

Chemical compound

Clinical data
- Other names: L-tyrosyl-D-alanyl-L-phenylalanyl-D-alanyl-L-tyrosinamide
- ATC code: None

Identifiers
- IUPAC name: (2S)-2-[(2R)-2-[(2S)-2-[(2R)-2-[(2S)-2-amino-3-(4-hydroxyphenyl)propanamido]propanamido]-3-phenylpropanamido]propanamido]-3-(4-hydroxyphenyl)propanamide
- CAS Number: 98815-38-4
- PubChem CID: 5464104
- ChemSpider: 4576538
- UNII: B453T1E8MP
- ChEMBL: ChEMBL2106384
- CompTox Dashboard (EPA): DTXSID30243827

Chemical and physical data
- Formula: C_{33}H_{40}N_{6}O_{7}
- Molar mass: 632.718 g·mol^{−1}
- 3D model (JSmol): Interactive image
- SMILES: O=C(N[C@@H](C(=O)N[C@H](C(=O)N[C@@H](C(=O)N[C@H](C(=O)N)Cc1ccc(O)cc1)C)Cc2ccccc2)C)[C@@H](N)Cc3ccc(O)cc3
- InChI: InChI=1S/C33H40N6O7/c1-19(36-32(45)26(34)16-22-8-12-24(40)13-9-22)31(44)39-28(18-21-6-4-3-5-7-21)33(46)37-20(2)30(43)38-27(29(35)42)17-23-10-14-25(41)15-11-23/h3-15,19-20,26-28,40-41H,16-18,34H2,1-2H3,(H2,35,42)(H,36,45)(H,37,46)(H,38,43)(H,39,44)/t19-,20-,26+,27+,28+/m1/s1; Key:XDRHVZLDLNGKLM-FLVVDCEDSA-N

Casokefamide (INN), also known as β-casomorphin 4027 (β-CM-4027) and [D-Ala^{2,4},Tyr^{5}]-β-casomorphin-5-amide, is a peripherally-specific, synthetic opioid pentapeptide with the amino acid sequence Tyr-D-Ala-Phe-D-Ala-Tyr-NH_{2}. Derived from the β-casomorphin sequence, it was designed with the intention of improving resistance to digestive enzymes so that it could be used as an antidiarrheal medicine. Unlike other casomorphins, which are generally selective μ-opioid receptor agonists, casokefamide binds to both the μ- and δ-opioid receptors. In a clinical study, casokefamide was found to be effective via the oral route for the treatment of chronic diarrhea, and did not produce any side effects. However, further clinical development was not pursued and it was never marketed.

== See also ==
- Morphiceptin
- Frakefamide
