= Cucurbalsaminol B =

Names
- IUPAC name (23E)-7β-Methoxy-9-methyl-19-nor-9β,10α-lanosta-5,23-diene-3β,12β,25-triol
- Systematic IUPAC name (1R,3aS,3bR,4S,7S,9aS,9bS,11R,11aR)-1-[(2R,4E)-6-Hydroxy-6-methylhept-4-en-2-yl]-4-methoxy-3a,6,6,9b,11a-pentamethyl-2,3,3a,3b,4,6,7,8,9,9a,9b,10,11,11a-tetradecahydro-1H-cyclopenta[a]phenanthrene-7,11-diol
- Other names 7β-Methoxycucurbita-(5,23E)-diene-3β,12β,25-triol; (3β,7β,9β,10α,12β,23E)-7-methoxy-4,4,9,14-tetramethyl-19-norcholesta-5,23-diene-3,12,23-triol

Identifiers
CAS Number	1189131-55-2
3D model (JSmol)	Interactive image
ChEMBL	ChEMBL1253844
ChemSpider	25991420
PubChem CID	44607451
UNII	LCG2BV4NT5
CompTox Dashboard (EPA)	DTXSID20659650
- InChI: InChI=1S/C31H52O4/c1-19(11-10-15-27(2,3)34)20-14-16-30(7)26-23(35-9)17-22-21(12-13-24(32)28(22,4)5)29(26,6)18-25(33)31(20,30)8/h10,15,17,19-21,23-26,32-34H,11-14,16,18H2,1-9H3/b15-10+/t19-,20-,21-,23+,24+,25-,26-,29+,30+,31+/m1/s1 Key: OSNWCRUHKQXEMA-KOBRMIIQSA-N
- SMILES: C[C@H](C/C=C/C(O)(C)C)[C@@]1([H])CC[C@@]2(C)[C@]3([H])[C@@H](OC)C=C4C(C)(C)[C@@H](O)CC[C@@]4([H])[C@]3(C)C[C@@H](O)[C@@]21C

Properties
Chemical formula	C_{31}H_{52}O_{4}
Molar mass	488.753 g·mol^{−1}
- Except where otherwise noted, data are given for materials in their standard state (at 25 °C [77 °F], 100 kPa). verify (what is ?) Infobox references

Cucurbalsaminol B or 7β-methoxycucurbita-5,23(E)-diene-3β,12β,25-triol, is a chemical compound with formula C_{31}H_{52}O_{4}, found in the Balsam apple vine (Momordica balsamina). It is a cucurbitane-type triterpenoid, related to cucurbitacin, isolated by C. Ramalhete and others in 2009.

Cucurbalsaminol B is an amorphous powder soluble in methanol and ethyl acetate but insoluble in n-hexane. It is cytotoxic at about 50 μM.

== See also ==
- Balsaminapentaol
- Balsaminol A
- Balsaminol B
- Cucurbalsaminol A
- Karavilagenin E
