= Balsaminol A =

Names
- IUPAC name (23R)-9-Methyl-19-nor-9β,10α-lanosta-5,24-diene-3β,7β,23,29-tetrol
- Systematic IUPAC name (1R,3aS,3bR,4S,6S,7S,9aS,9bS,11aR)-6-(Hydroxymethyl)-1-[(2R,4R)-4-hydroxy-6-methylhept-5-en-2-yl]-3a,6,9b,11a-tetramethyl-2,3,3a,3b,4,6,7,8,9,9a,9b,10,11,11a-tetradecahydro-1H-cyclopenta[a]phenanthrene-4,7-diol
- Other names Cucurbita-5,24-diene-3β,7β,23(R),29-tetraol; (3β,4β,7β,9β,10α,23R)-4-(Hydroxymethyl)-4,9,14-trimethyl-19-norcholesta-5,24-diene-3,7,23-triol

Identifiers
CAS Number	1189131-51-8
3D model (JSmol)	Interactive image; Interactive image
ChEMBL	ChEMBL1078436
ChemSpider	24655824
PubChem CID	44607276
UNII	XN2W8NF8BB
CompTox Dashboard (EPA)	DTXSID30659646
- InChI: InChI=1S/C30H50O4/c1-18(2)14-20(32)15-19(3)21-10-11-30(7)26-24(33)16-23-22(8-9-25(34)28(23,5)17-31)27(26,4)12-13-29(21,30)6/h14,16,19-22,24-26,31-34H,8-13,15,17H2,1-7H3/t19-,20+,21-,22-,24+,25+,26-,27+,28-,29-,30+/m1/s1 Key: AVFNYXHRDYAHNF-HEVJPHJFSA-N
- SMILES: C[C@H](C[C@@H](O)/C=C(C)/C)[C@@]1([H])CC[C@@]2(C)[C@]3([H])[C@@H](O)C=C4[C@@](C)(CO)[C@@H](O)CC[C@@]4([H])[C@]3(C)CC[C@@]21C; C[C@H](C[C@H](C=C(C)C)O)[C@H]1CC[C@@]2([C@@]1(CC[C@@]3([C@H]2[C@H](C=C4[C@H]3CC[C@@H]([C@]4(C)CO)O)O)C)C)C

Properties
Chemical formula	C_{30}H_{50}O_{4}
Molar mass	474.726 g·mol^{−1}
- Except where otherwise noted, data are given for materials in their standard state (at 25 °C [77 °F], 100 kPa). verify (what is ?) Infobox references

Balsaminol A or cucurbita-5,24-diene-3β,7β,23(R),29-tetraol, is a chemical compound with formula C_{30}H_{50}O_{4}, found in the Balsam apple vine (Momordica balsamina). It is a cucurbitane-type triterpenoid, related to cucurbitacin, isolated by C. Ramalhete and others in 2009.

Balsaminol A is an amorphous powder soluble in methanol and ethyl acetate but insoluble in n-hexane. It is cytotoxic at about 50 μM.

== See also ==
- Balsaminapentaol
- Balsaminol B
- Cucurbalsaminol A
- Cucurbalsaminol B
- Karavilagenin E
