= Isocoproporphyrin =

Identifiers
CAS Number	36548-09-1
3D model (JSmol)	Interactive image
ChemSpider	148480
MeSH	C005524
PubChem CID	169785
- InChI: InChI=1S/C36H38N4O8/c1-5-20-17(2)25-13-26-18(3)21(6-9-33(41)42)29(38-26)15-31-23(8-11-35(45)46)24(12-36(47)48)32(40-31)16-30-22(7-10-34(43)44)19(4)27(39-30)14-28(20)37-25/h13-16,37,40H,5-12H2,1-4H3,(H,41,42)(H,43,44)(H,45,46)(H,47,48)/b25-13-,26-13-,27-14-,28-14-,29-15-,30-16-,31-15-,32-16- Key: UHKZSWAPQUEURH-TXUIXYGZSA-N
- SMILES: CCC1=C(C2=CC3=NC(=CC4=C(C(=C(N4)C=C5C(=C(C(=N5)C=C1N2)C)CCC(=O)O)CC(=O)O)CCC(=O)O)C(=C3C)CCC(=O)O)C

Properties
Chemical formula	C_{36}H_{38}N_{4}O_{8}
Molar mass	654.70892
- Except where otherwise noted, data are given for materials in their standard state (at 25 °C [77 °F], 100 kPa). verify (what is ?) Infobox references

Isocoproporphyrin is a tetrapyrrole belonging to the porphyrin family.

== See also ==
- Porphyria cutanea tarda
