= Pyranthrene (molecule) =

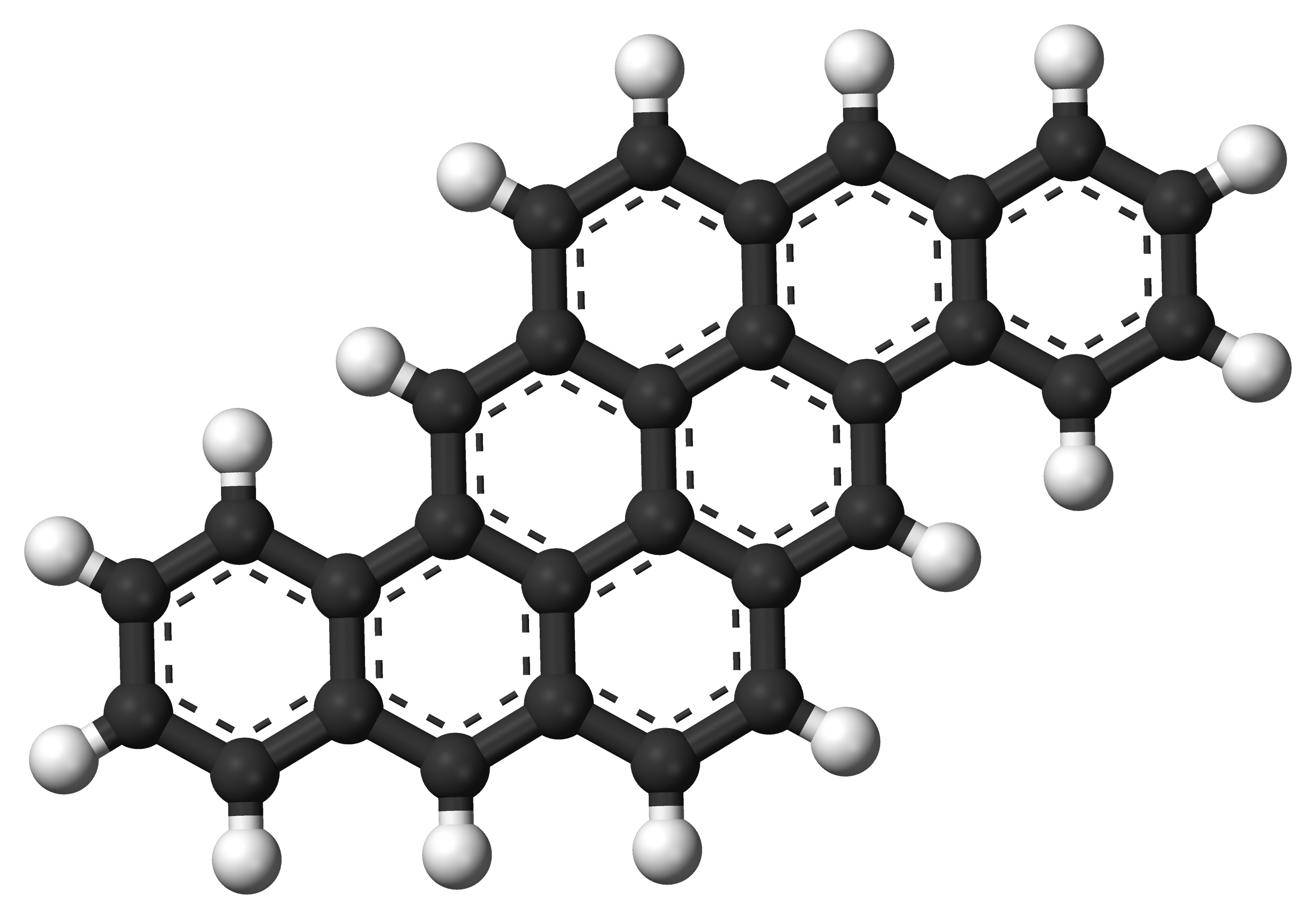

Identifiers
CAS Number	191-13-9
3D model (JSmol)	Interactive image
Beilstein Reference	1915988
ChEBI	CHEBI:33159
ChemSpider	60772
ECHA InfoCard	100.005.349
EC Number	205-882-2
PubChem CID	67447
UNII	4QT2M2U8AP
CompTox Dashboard (EPA)	DTXSID80172613
- InChI: InChI=1S/C30H16/c1-3-7-23-17(5-1)13-19-9-11-22-16-26-24-8-4-2-6-18(24)14-20-10-12-21-15-25(23)27(19)29(22)30(21)28(20)26/h1-16H Key: LNKHTYQPVMAJSF-UHFFFAOYSA-N
- SMILES: C1=CC=C2C(=C1)C=C3C=CC4=CC5=C6C(=CC7=CC=CC=C75)C=CC8=CC2=C3C4=C86

Properties
Chemical formula	C_{30}H_{16}
Molar mass	376.458 g/mol
Appearance	reddish-brown or yellowish
Density	1.4±0.1 g/cm^{3}
- Except where otherwise noted, data are given for materials in their standard state (at 25 °C [77 °F], 100 kPa). Infobox references

Pyranthrene is a molecule with the chemical formula C_{30}H_{16}.

== Properties ==
Pyranthrene is made up of eight benzene rings fused together, which classes it as a polycyclic aromatic hydrocarbon.

It has a reddish-brown color, but turns to a yellowish color when it is purified via sublimation. The difference between these two forms of the molecule comes from the difference in the degrees of their crystallinity. The brown form of pyranthrene forms more perfect crystallites than the yellow form does.

Pyranthrene is also an organic semiconductor. It displays photoconductive properties when it is in a solid state, as well as when it is dissolved in a benzene solution.

It has a density of 1.4±0.1 g/cm^{3}.

== Uses ==
Pyranthrene has potential uses as a material used to make organic light-emitting diodes and solar cells.

In addition, it has photophysical properties that allow it to be useful for biological imaging and sensing. However, pyranthrene has been shown to cause oxidative stress and DNA damage within cells, and is classed as a carcinogen and an endocrine disruptor, which heavily limits its use in biological systems.

== Synthesis ==
Pyranthrene can be synthesized by reducing pyranthrone with zinc dust, acetic acid, and pyridine.
