= Jacobsen rearrangement =

Chemical reaction

The Jacobsen rearrangement is a chemical reaction, commonly described as the migration of an alkyl group in a sulfonic acid derived from a polyalkyl- or polyhalobenzene:

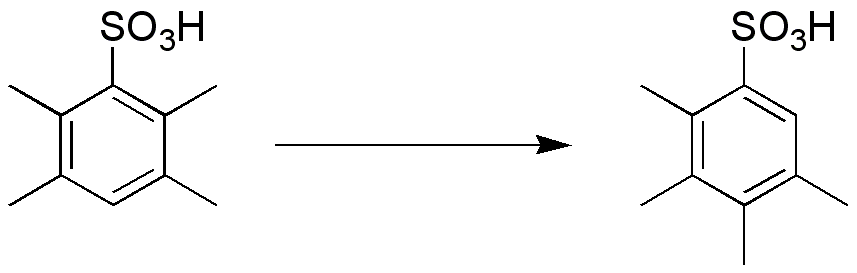
Jacobsen rearrangement

The exact reaction mechanism is not completely clear, but evidence indicates that the rearrangement occurs intermolecularly and that the migrating group is transferred to a polyalkylbenzene, not to the sulfonic acid (sulfonation only takes place after migration). The intermolecular mechanism is partially illustrated by the side products found in the following example:

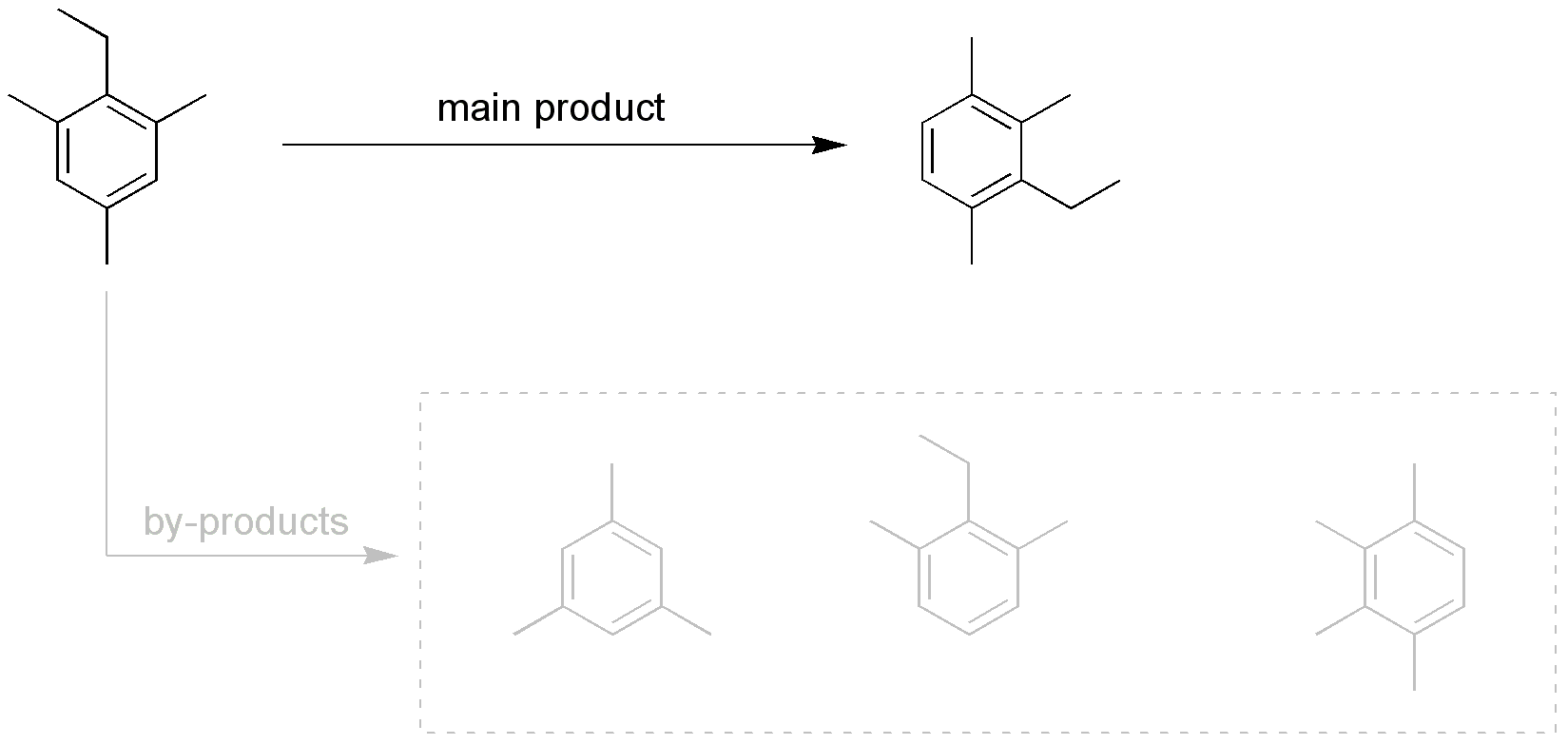
Jacobsen rearrangement

Furthermore, the reaction is limited to benzene rings with at least four substituents (alkyl and/or halogen groups). The sulfo group is easily removed, so the Jacobsen rearrangement can also be considered as a rearrangement of polyalkylbenzenes. It was Herzig who described this type of rearrangement for the first time in 1881 using polyhalogenated benzenesulfonic acids, but the reaction took the name of the German chemist Oscar Jacobsen, who described the rearrangement of polyalkylbenzene derivatives in 1886.
