= Frakefamide =

Opioid agonist peptide compound

Clinical data
- Other names: L-Tyrosyl-D-alanyl-4-fluoro-L-phenylalanyl-L-phenylalaninamide
- ATC code: None

Identifiers
- IUPAC name: (2S)-2-[(2R)-2-[(2S)-2-amino-3-(4-hydroxyphenyl)propanamido]propanamido]-N-[(1S)-1-carbamoyl-2-phenylethyl]-3-(4-fluorophenyl)propanamide
- CAS Number: 188196-22-7
- PubChem CID: 9829352
- ChemSpider: 8005088
- UNII: DM32B4GU70
- CompTox Dashboard (EPA): DTXSID701030318

Chemical and physical data
- Formula: C_{30}H_{34}FN_{5}O_{5}
- Molar mass: 563.630 g·mol^{−1}
- 3D model (JSmol): Interactive image
- SMILES: C[C@H](C(=O)N[C@@H](CC1=CC=C(C=C1)F)C(=O)N[C@@H](CC2=CC=CC=C2)C(=O)N)NC(=O)[C@H](CC3=CC=C(C=C3)O)N
- InChI: InChI=1S/C30H34FN5O5/c1-18(34-29(40)24(32)15-20-9-13-23(37)14-10-20)28(39)36-26(17-21-7-11-22(31)12-8-21)30(41)35-25(27(33)38)16-19-5-3-2-4-6-19/h2-14,18,24-26,37H,15-17,32H2,1H3,(H2,33,38)(H,34,40)(H,35,41)(H,36,39)/t18-,24+,25+,26+/m1/s1; Key:GTPHQORJKFJIRB-JTQLPTLWSA-N

Frakefamide (INN) is a synthetic, fluorinated linear tetrapeptide with the amino acid sequence Tyr-D-Ala-(p-F)Phe-Phe-NH_{2} which acts as a peripherally-specific, selective μ-opioid receptor agonist. Despite its inability to penetrate the blood-brain-barrier and enter the central nervous system, frakefamide has potent analgesic effects and, unlike centrally-acting opioids like morphine, does not produce respiratory depression, indicating that its antinociceptive effects are mediated by peripheral μ-opioid receptors. It was under development for the treatment of pain by AstraZeneca and Shire but was shelved after phase II clinical trials.

== See also ==
- Casokefamide
- Metkefamide
