= Xanthorhamnin =

- Xanthorhamnin structure

Names
- IUPAC name 3′,4′,5-Trihydroxy-7-methoxy-2-[α-L-rhamnopyranosyl-(1→3)-α-L-rhamnopyranosyl-(1→6)-β-D-galactopyranosyloxy]flavone
- Systematic IUPAC name (4^{2}S,4^{3}R,4^{4}S,4^{5}R,4^{6}R,7^{2}R,7^{3}R,7^{4}R,7^{5}S,7^{6}S,9^{2}S,9^{3}R,9^{4}R,9^{5}R,9^{6}S)-1^{3},1^{4},2^{5},4^{3},4^{4},4^{5},7^{3},7^{5},9^{3},9^{4},9^{5}-Undecahydroxy-2^{7}-methoxy-7^{6},9^{6}-dimethyl-2^{4}H-3,6,8-trioxa-2(2,3)-[1]benzopyrana-4(2,6),7(2,4),9(2)-tris(oxana)-1(1)-benzenanonaphan-2^{4}-one

Identifiers
CAS Number	75183-90-3
3D model (JSmol)	Interactive image
ChemSpider	4508511
PubChem CID	5351495
UNII	E9P3Y54GDF
CompTox Dashboard (EPA)	DTXSID50417705
- InChI: InChI=1S/C34H42O20/c1-10-20(38)24(42)26(44)33(50-10)53-30-21(39)11(2)49-32(28(30)46)48-9-18-22(40)25(43)27(45)34(52-18)54-31-23(41)19-16(37)7-13(47-3)8-17(19)51-29(31)12-4-5-14(35)15(36)6-12/h4-8,10-11,18,20-22,24-28,30,32-40,42-46H,9H2,1-3H3/t10-,11-,18+,20-,21-,22-,24+,25-,26+,27+,28+,30+,32+,33-,34-/m0/s1 Key: NMGVHLDIHNFGQB-OTCPXFHUSA-N; InChI=1/C34H42O20/c1-10-20(38)24(42)26(44)33(50-10)53-30-21(39)11(2)49-32(28(30)46)48-9-18-22(40)25(43)27(45)34(52-18)54-31-23(41)19-16(37)7-13(47-3)8-17(19)51-29(31)12-4-5-14(35)15(36)6-12/h4-8,10-11,18,20-22,24-28,30,32-40,42-46H,9H2,1-3H3/t10-,11-,18+,20-,21-,22-,24+,25-,26+,27+,28+,30+,32+,33-,34-/m0/s1 Key: NMGVHLDIHNFGQB-OTCPXFHUBI
- SMILES: CC1C(C(C(C(O1)OC2C(C(OC(C2O)OCC3C(C(C(C(O3)OC4=C(OC5=CC(=CC(=C5C4=O)O)OC)C6=CC(=C(C=C6)O)O)O)O)O)C)O)O)O)O

Properties
Chemical formula	C_{34}H_{42}O_{20}
Molar mass	770.68 g/mol
- Except where otherwise noted, data are given for materials in their standard state (at 25 °C [77 °F], 100 kPa). verify (what is ?) Infobox references

Xanthorhamnin is a chemical compound. It can be isolated from buckthorn berries (Rhamnus catharticus).

The aglycone of xanthorhamnin is rhamnetin.
