= Algar–Flynn–Oyamada reaction =

Chemical reaction producing flavonol

The Algar–Flynn–Oyamada reaction is a chemical reaction whereby a chalcone undergoes an oxidative cyclization to form a flavonol.

The Algar–Flynn–Oyamada reaction

== Reaction mechanism ==
There are several possible mechanisms to explain this reaction; however, these reaction mechanisms have not been elucidated. What is known is that a two-stage mechanism exists. First, dihydroflavonol is formed, which then subsequently oxidizes to form a flavonol.

Proposed mechanisms involving epoxidation of the alkene have been disproven.

The probable mechanisms are thus two possibilities:

- The phenoxide attacks the enone at the beta position, and the alkene directly attacks hydrogen peroxide from the alpha position, forming the dihydroflavonol.
- The phenoxide attacks the enone at the beta position, closing the six-membered ring and forming an enolate intermediate. The enolate then attacks hydrogen peroxide, forming the dihydroflavonol.

Possible mechanisms

== See also ==
- Allan–Robinson reaction
- Auwers synthesis
