= Excited state intramolecular proton transfer =

Physical phenomenon

Excited state intramolecular proton transfer (ESIPT) is a process in which photoexcited molecules relax their energy through tautomerization by transfer of protons. Some kinds of molecules could have different minimum-energy tautomers in different electronic states, and if the molecular structure of minimum-energy tautomer in the excited state is proton-transferred geometry between neighboring atoms, proton transfer in excited state can occur. The tautomerization often takes the form of keto-enol tautomerism.

In rare reported cases, proton transfer can occur between non-adjacent donor and acceptor sites rather than between neighbouring atoms. For example, iridium(III) complexes with acyclic diaminocarbene ligands containing a pyrazine ring undergo ESIPT upon photoexcitation. Metal-to-ligand charge transfer increases the basicity of the pyrazine, promoting proton transfer and causing a nearly 100 nm redshift in emission relative to pyridine analogues. The emission is solvent-dependent: orange in aprotic solvents and blue-green in ethanol, where hydrogen bonding blocks proton transfer. These complexes are the first metal-organic luminophores in which ESIPT involves direct participation of the metal centre, with the acyclic diaminocarbene ligand acting as the central photoactive unit.

== Characteristic ==
Since a proton-transferred geometry is usually the minimum-energy tautomer only in the excited state and relatively unstable in the ground state, molecules that have ESIPT character may show extraordinarily larger Stokes shift than common fluorescent molecules, or exhibit dual fluorescence that shorter-wavelength one comes from the original tautomer and longer-wavelength one from proton-transferred tautomer. However, there are some exceptional cases where ESIPT molecules have no dual luminescence or significantly red-shifted emission from proton-transferred tautomer, from various reasons.

Rate of ESIPT process may slow down by deuterium substitution of hydrogen that is transferred in ESIPT, because the deuteration increases only mass of the transferred significantly while do not change electrostatic potential in the molecule substantially. However the amount of rate change may lie in the range of 1~50, depending on the shape and size of potential energy surfaces of the molecule.

== Application ==
Based on characteristic that molecules usually have extraordinarily larger Stokes shift when ESIPT occurs, various applications have been developed using red-shifted fluorescence. Applications include turn-on photoluminescence sensor, photochromic, non-destructive optical memory, and white-light emitting materials.

Because phenol does not form a ketal under normal conditions because it does not tautomerize to any useful extent; however under ESIPT in the presence of an alcohol, e.g. ethylene glycol, it became possible to trap 1,4-Dioxaspiro[4.5]deca-6,8-diene [23783-59-7].
