= Balsam apple =

Balsam apple may refer to:

- Clusia rosea, a tree species found in America
- Momordica balsamina, a vine species found in Africa
- Momordica charantia (bitter melon), a vine grown for its bitter and edible fruit
- Echinocystis lobata (wild cucumber)
- Species of gourds in the genus Echinopepon (family Cucurbitaceae)
