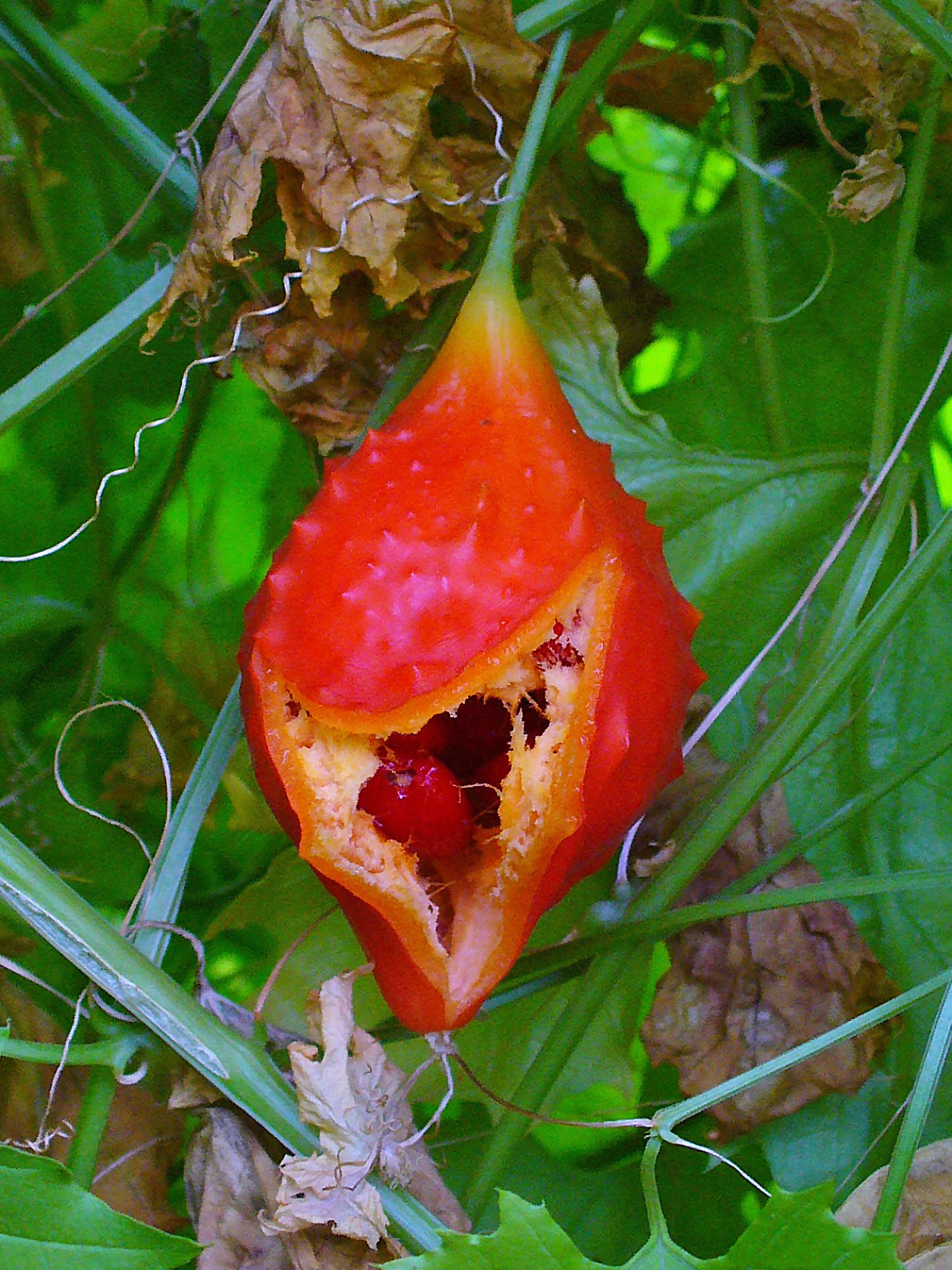

Scientific classification
- Kingdom: Plantae
- Clade: Tracheophytes
- Clade: Angiosperms
- Clade: Eudicots
- Clade: Rosids
- Order: Cucurbitales
- Family: Cucurbitaceae
- Genus: Momordica
- Species: M. balsamina

Binomial name
- Momordica balsamina L.

= Momordica balsamina =

Species of flowering plant

Momordica balsamina, known by the common name balsam apple, is a species of tendril-bearing annual vine native to tropical regions of Africa, as well as introduced and invasive in parts of Asia, Australia, Central America, and North America. In 1810, Thomas Jefferson planted this vine in his flower borders at his Virginia home of Monticello, along with larkspur, poppies, and nutmeg.

== Description ==
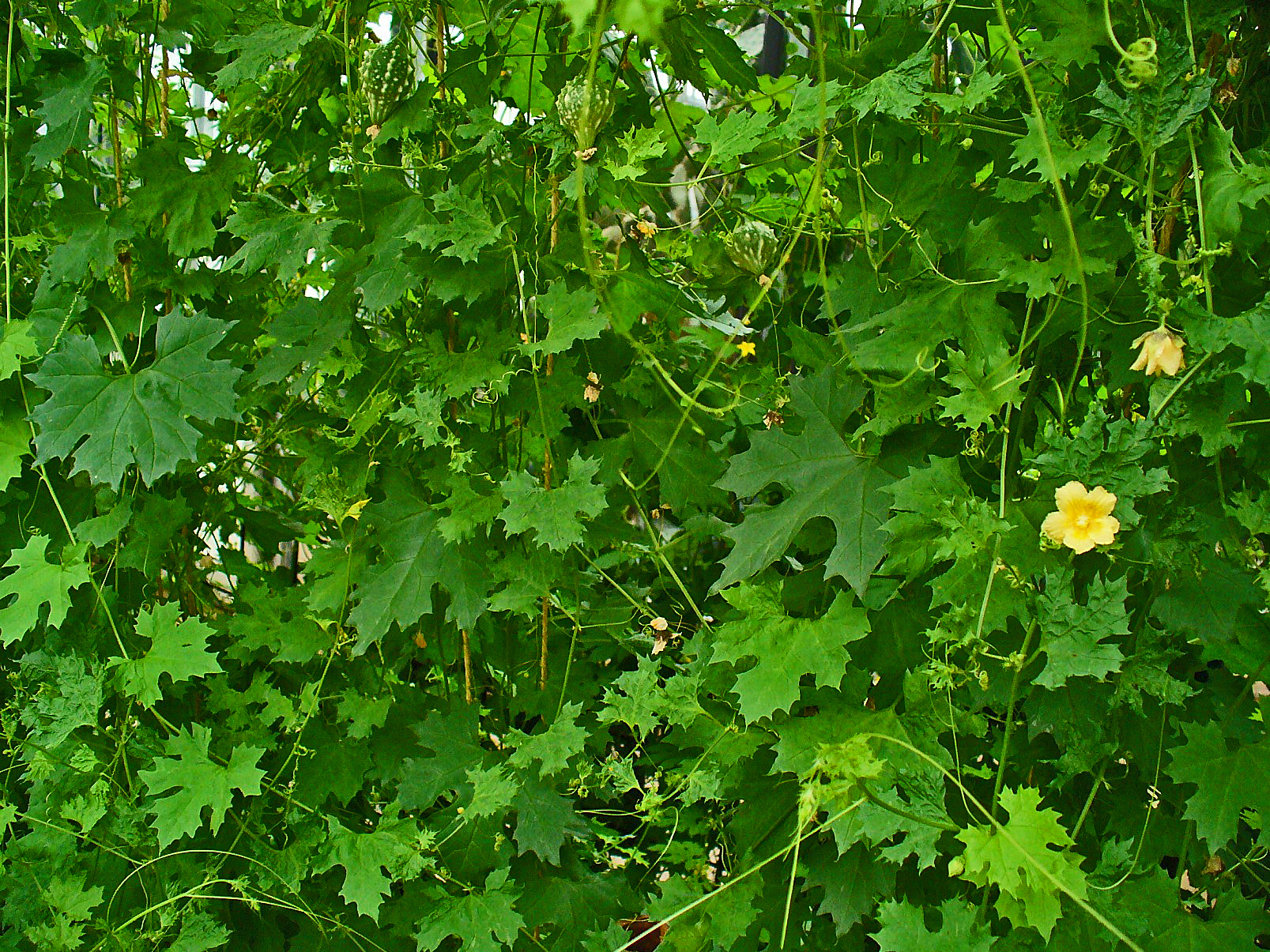
View of leaves and flowers

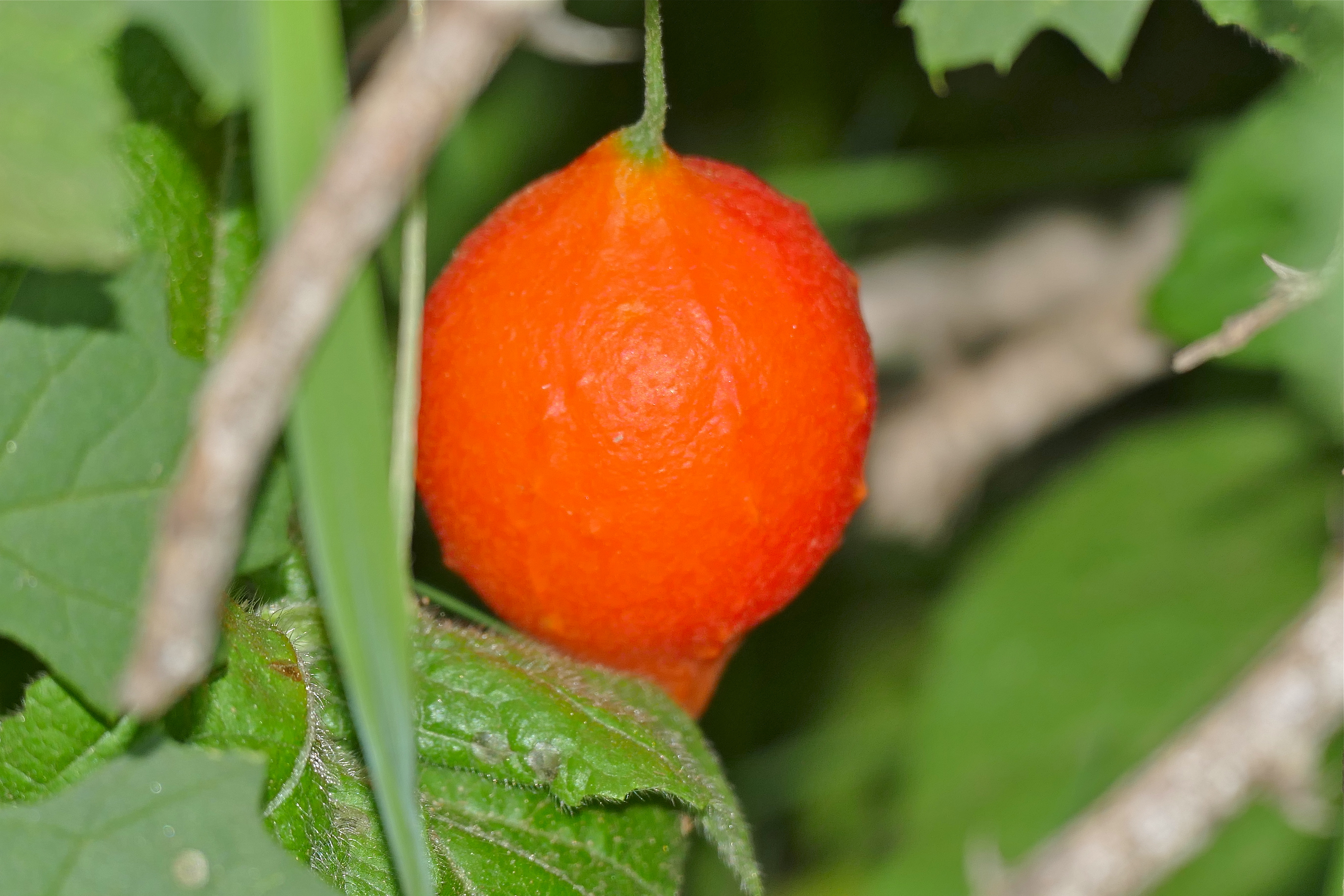
Scarlet-colored ripe fruit

M. balsamina is a climbing annual to perennial herbaceous plant up to 5 meters long. Its stem is thin, angular and slightly hairy. The alternately arranged leaves are divided into petiole and leaf blade. The hairy petiole is short. The soft, thin leaf blade is up to 12 centimeters in size, heart-shaped and broadly ovate to rounded in outline. The sparsely hairy leaf blade is palmately divided into five to seven lobes and the leaf lobes are each multiply lobed or remotely sharp-toothed. The leaf margins are entire and often pointed on the lobe tips or teeth. The thin tendrils are simple and long.

It has pale yellow, deeply veined flowers and round, somewhat warty, bright orange fruits, colloquially called "apples". When ripe, the fruits burst apart, revealing numerous seeds covered with a brilliant scarlet, extremely sticky coating.

=== Reproductive traits ===
A monoecious plant, its flowers, some of which have long stalks, appear individually, laterally, each with a bract. The single flowers are five-fold with a double perianth. The finely hairy calyx has five lobes. The corolla is white or yellow. The female flowers are short-stalked, the ovary is inferior and single-chambered and slightly below the calyx. The stylus is three-branched with a divided scar per branch. Staminodes may be present. The male flowers are longer-stalked and have five fused stamens in threes, with feathery and branching anthers. At the bottom of the stamens, appendages can be formed inside.

The red or orange leathery berries are pointed-humped, ellipsoid and short-beaked with a length of 4.5 to 7 centimeters. When the fruit ripens, it opens with three flaps and releases the many seeds. The up to about 1 centimeter large, elliptical and brownish, sculpted seeds are each covered in a red, sticky seed coat "pulp" (a false arillus).

== Uses ==
Some botanical texts indicate that the outer rind and the seeds of the fruit are poisonous, though the Tsonga people of southern Africa are known to eat the leaves and fruit of the plant; in West Africa, it is a popular anti-malaria remedy. The balsam apple was introduced into Europe by 1568 and was used medicinally to treat wounds. "Oleum Momordicae" was understood in pharmacy as tree oil poured onto the fruits of Momordica balsamina. The fruit and leaves are used as a soap substitute. The plant sap can be used medicinally or as a metal cleaner, and it is also processed into an arrow poison.

== Names ==
Momordica balsamina and the related Momordica charantia share some common names: African cucumber, balsam apple, and balsam pear. Other names for M. balsamina are balsamina or southern balsam pear. It is known in Africa under a broad range of names, e.g. in Mozambique as cacana and in South Africa as nkaka.In the Hausa language, it is known as Garahuni or Garafuni.

== See also ==
- Momordica charantia
