= Cucurbitane =

Names
- IUPAC name 19-Nor-5ξ,9β,10α-lanostane
- Systematic IUPAC name (1R,3aS,3bR,5aΞ,9aR,9bS,11aR)-3a,6,6,9b,11a-Pentamethyl-1-[(2R)-6-methylheptan-2-yl]hexadecahydro-1H-cyclopenta[a]phenanthrene

Identifiers
| CAS Number | 65441-59-0 (5α/β) |
| 3D model (JSmol) | (5α): Interactive image; (5β): Interactive image |
| ChEBI | CHEBI:73245 |
| ChemSpider | 25936933 (5α); 28639243 (5β) |
| PubChem CID | 71306377 |
| UNII | VQU8QE865A |
| CompTox Dashboard (EPA) | DTXSID50745373 |
- InChI: InChI=1S/C30H54/c1-21(2)11-9-12-22(3)23-16-18-30(8)26-15-14-24-25(13-10-17-27(24,4)5)28(26,6)19-20-29(23,30)7/h21-26H,9-20H2,1-8H3/t22-,23-,24-,25-,26-,28+,29-,30+/m1/s1 Key: ZYZJWAJOTPNVPI-AUAIAXQGSA-N; (5α): InChI=1/C30H54/c1-21(2)11-9-12-22(3)23-16-18-30(8)26-15-14-24-25(13-10-17-27(24,4)5)28(26,6)19-20-29(23,30)7/h21-26H,9-20H2,1-8H3/t22-,23-,24-,25-,26-,28+,29-,30+/m1/s1 Key: ZYZJWAJOTPNVPI-AUAIAXQGBW; (5β): InChI=1/C30H54/c1-21(2)11-9-12-22(3)23-16-18-30(8)26-15-14-24-25(13-10-17-27(24,4)5)28(26,6)19-20-29(23,30)7/h21-26H,9-20H2,1-8H3/t22-,23-,24+,25-,26-,28+,29-,30+/m1/s1 Key: ZYZJWAJOTPNVPI-QJMYWHNVBB; (5β): InChI=1S/C30H54/c1-21(2)11-9-12-22(3)23-16-18-30(8)26-15-14-24-25(13-10-17-27(24,4)5)28(26,6)19-20-29(23,30)7/h21-26H,9-20H2,1-8H3/t22-,23-,24+,25-,26-,28+,29-,30+/m1/s1 Key: ZYZJWAJOTPNVPI-QJMYWHNVSA-N
- SMILES: (5α): C[C@H](CCCC(C)C)[C@@]1([H])CC[C@@]2(C)[C@]3([H])CC[C@@]4([H])C(C)(C)CCC[C@@]4([H])[C@]3(C)CC[C@@]21C; (5β): C[C@H](CCCC(C)C)[C@@]1([H])CC[C@@]2(C)[C@]3([H])CC[C@]4([H])C(C)(C)CCC[C@@]4([H])[C@]3(C)CC[C@@]21C

Properties
| Chemical formula | C_{30}H_{54} |
| Molar mass | 414.762 g·mol^{−1} |
- Except where otherwise noted, data are given for materials in their standard state (at 25 °C [77 °F], 100 kPa). verify (what is ?) Infobox references

Cucurbitane is a tetracyclic chemical compound with formula C_{30}H_{54}. It is a polycyclic hydrocarbon, specifically triterpene. It is also an isomer of lanostane (specifically 19(10→9β)-abeolanostane), from which it differs by the formal shift of a methyl group (carbon number 19) from the 10 to the 9β position in the standard steroid numbering scheme.

The name is applied to two stereoisomers, distinguished by the prefixes 5α- and 5β-, which differ by the handedness of the bonds at a particular carbon atom (number 5 in the standard steroid numbering scheme).

5α-Cucurbitane

5β-Cucurbitane

Cucurbitane is the core chemical structure of a class of derivatives known as cucurbitane-type triterpenoids or simply as cucurbitanes.

== Derivatives ==
=== Natural compounds ===
Compounds with the basic cucurbitane skeleton are found in many plants, and some are important phytopharmaceuticals. Natural cucurbitane-related compounds include:

==== Named ====
- Balsaminapentaol, from Momordica balsamina.
- Balsaminol A, from Momordica balsamina.
- Balsaminol B, from Momordica balsamina.
- Brydioside A from Bryonia dioica
- Bryoamaride and derivatives from Bryonia dioica
- Charantin or foetidin, from Momordica charantia and Momordica foetida
- Charantosides I-VIII, from Momordica charantia.
- Cucurbalsaminol B, from Momordica balsamina.
- Cucurbalsaminol A, from Momordica balsamina.
- Cucurbitacins A-L, O-T
- Datiscosides, from Datisca glomerata
- Endecaphyllacins A and B, from roots of Hemsleya endecaphylla
- Hemslecins A and B, from roots of H. endecaphylla
- Lepidolide, from the mushroom Russula lepida
- Karavilagenin E, from Momordica balsamina.
- Khekadaengosides A, B, D and K, from Trichosanthes tricuspidata
- Kuguacins A-S, from stems and leaves of Momordica charantia
- Kuguaglycosides A-H, from the root of Momordica charantia
- Mogrosides I-V, from the fruits of Siraitia grosvenorii
- Momordicin I, II and 28, from Momordica charantia
- Momordicines II and IV, from leaves of Momordica charantia
- Momordicosides A-S, from Momordica charantia fruits
- Neokuguaglucoside, from Momordica charantia fruits
- Neomogroside, from the fruit of Siraitia grosvenorii.
- Pentanorcucurbitacins A and B
- Perseapicroside A, from Persea mexicana
- Scandenoside R9, from Hemsleya panacis-scandens
- Spinosides A and B, from Desfontainia spinosa

==== Unnamed ====
- 3β,7β,23ξ-trihydroxycucurbita-5,24-dien-19-al, soluble in chloroform, melts at 123−125 °C, from Momordica charantia, Momordica foetida.
- 3β,7β,25-trihydroxycucurbita-5,23-dien-19-al, soluble in chloroform, melts at 188−191 °C, from Momordica charantia, Momordica foetida
- 3β,7β-dihydroxy-25-methoxycucurbita-5,23-dien-19-al, soluble in chloroform, from Momordica charantia, Momordica foetida
- 5β,19-epoxy-25-methoxycucurbita-6,23-dien-3β,19-diol, soluble in chloroform, melts at 182−184 °C, from Momordica foetida
- 5β,19-epoxycucurbita-6,23-dien-3β,19,25-triol, soluble in chloroform, from Momordica foetida
- 5β,19-epoxy-19-methoxycucurbita-6,23-dien-3β,25-diol, soluble in chloroform, melts at 102−104 °C, from Momordica charantia, Momordica foetida
- 5β,19-epoxy-19,25-dimethoxycucurbita-6,23-dien-3β-ol, soluble in chloroform, from Momordica charantia, Momordica foetida
- 5β,19-epoxy-25-methoxycucurbita-6,23-dien-3β-ol, soluble in chloroform, melts at 139−141 °C, from Momordica charantia, Momordica foetida
- 19(R)-n-butanoxy-5β,19-epoxycucurbita-6,23-diene-3β,25-diol 3-O-β-glucopyranoside, C_{40}H_{66}O_{9}, white powder soluble in methanol, from Momordica charantia fruit (8 mg/35 kg)
- 23-O-β-allopyranosylecucurbita-5,24-dien-7α,3β,22(R),23(S)-tetraol 3-O-β-allopyranoside,C_{42}H_{69}O_{14}, white powder soluble in methanol, from Momordica charantia fruit (10 mg/35 kg)
- 23(R),24(S),25-trihydroxycucurbit-5-ene 3-O-{[β-glucopyranosyl(1→6)]-O-β-glucopyranosyl}-25-O-β-glucopyranoside, C_{48}H_{82}O_{19}, white powder soluble in methanol, from Momordica charantia fruit (10 mg/35 kg)
- 2,16-dihydroxy-22,23,24,25,26,27-hexanorcucurbit-5-en-11,20-dione 2-O-β-D-glucopyranoside, soluble in ethanol, from Cucurbita pepo fruits (25 mg/15 kg)
- 16-hydroxy-22,23,24,25,26,27-hexanorcucurbit-5-en-11,20-dione 3-O-α-L-rhamnopyranosyl-(1→2)-β-D-glucopyranoside, white powder, soluble in ethanol, from Cucurbita pepo fruits (12 mg/15 kg)
- 7-methoxycucurbita-5,24-diene-3β,23(R)-diol, from Momordica balsamina
- 25,26,27-trinorcucurbit-5-ene-3,7,23-trione C_{27}H_{40}O_{3}, white powder, soluble in methanol, from stems of Momordica charantia (6 mg/18 kg)

== See also ==
- Goyaglicoside
- Karaviloside
- Momordenol, from Momordica charantia
- 24(R)-stigmastan-3β,5α,6β-triol-25-ene 3-O-β-glucopyranoside, C_{35}H_{60}O_{8}, white powder, from Momordica charantia fruit (15 mg/35 kg)
