= Momordicin =

Momordicin is one of several compounds found in the bitter melon vine, including:

- Momordicin I, a chemical compound found in the leaves
- Momordicin II
- Momordicin-28

== See also ==
- Momordicinin
- Momordicilin
- Momordenol
- Momordol
