= C30H44O7 =

The molecular formula C_{30}H_{44}O_{7} (molar mass: 516.66 g/mol, exact mass: 516.3087 u) may refer to:

- Angustific acid B
- Cucurbitacin D
- Ganoderic acid
