= Charantin =

Chemical substance

Charantin is a chemical substance obtained from the Asian bitter melon (Momordica charantia), reputed to be responsible for the hypoglycaemic properties of those plants. It was identified by Lolitkar and Rao in 1960. It was also found in the similar African species M. foetida, by A. Olaniyi in 1975, under the name foetidin.

Charantin is actually a 1:1 mixture of two steroidal saponins, β-sitosteryl glucoside (C_{35}H_{60}O_{6}) and 5,22-stigmasteryl glucoside (C_{35}H_{58}O_{6}). It is a whitish crystalline substance, neutral and tasteless, melting at 266–268 °C. It is sparingly soluble in water or other highly polar solvents, as well as in apolar solvents like hexane, but is soluble in ether, ethanol and methanol, and can be efficiently extracted from the plant by pressurized ethanol or acetone at 100 °C.

The name charantin has also been used by A. Parkash and other for a different compound, a peptide with molecular mass 9.7 kDa, also isolated from bitter melon seeds.

== See also ==
- Charantoside
- Goyaglycoside
- Karaviloside
- Momordicoside
