= Kuguacin =

A kuguacin is one of several chemical compounds isolated from the bitter melon vine (Momordica charantia, kǔguā in Chinese) by J.-C. Chen and others.

Kuguacins are cucurbitacins, formally derived from the triterpene hydrocarbon cucurbitane. They include:

- Kuguacin A
- Kuguacin B
- Kuguacin C
- Kuguacin D
- Kuguacin E
- Kuguacin F: C_{30}H_{42}O_{5}; 47 mg/kg, needles, melts at 275–276 °C
- Kuguacin G: C_{30}H_{44}O_{6}; 23 mg/kg, needles, melts at 250–252 °C
- Kuguacin H: C_{30}H_{44}O_{5}; 27 mg/kg, needles, melts at 226–228 °C
- Kuguacin I: C_{31}H_{46}O_{4}; 20 mg/kg, needles, melts at 235–237 °C
- Kuguacin J: C_{30}H_{46}O_{3}; 243 mg/kg, powder, melts at 166–169 °C
- Kuguacin K: C_{25}H_{34}O_{6}; 130 mg/kg, powder, melts at 275–277 °C
- Kuguacin L: C_{25}H_{36}O_{4}; 30 mg/kg, needles, melts at 320–321 °C
- Kuguacin M: C_{22}H_{28}O_{4}; 7 mg/kg, needles, melts at 332–333 °C
- Kuguacin N: C_{30}H_{46}O_{4}; 247 mg/kg, powder, melts at 140–143 °C
- Kuguacin O: C_{30}H_{42}O_{4}; 20 mg/kg, needles, melts at 267–269 °C
- Kuguacin P: C_{27}H_{40}O_{4}; 293 mg/kg, prisms, melts at 229–231 °C
- Kuguacin Q: C_{29}H_{44}O_{5}; 11 mg/kg, needles, melts at 219–221 °C
- Kuguacin R: C_{30}H_{48}O_{4}; 1357 mg/kg
- Kuguacin S: C_{30}H_{44}O_{4}; 17 mg/kg, powder, melts at 174–177 °C

Kuguacins F-S can be extracted with ethanol from the stems and leaves of M. charantia. Kuguacins I, J, and Q are artifacts of the extraction process. Kuguacin R is obtained as mixture of two epimers. In this process one also obtains momordicine I, kuguacin E, 5β,19-epoxycucurbita-6,23-diene-3β,19,25-triol, karavilagenin D, 3β,7β,25-trihydroxycucurbita-5,(23E)-dien-19-al, and 3β,7β-dihydroxy-25-methoxycucurbita-5,(23E)-dien-19-al In vitro tests showed weak anti-HIV activity for kuguacins F-S, especially kuguacin Q and kuguacin S.
