= C42H66O14 =

The molecular formula C_{42}H_{66}O_{14} (molar mass: 794.96 g/mol, exact mass: 794.4453 u) may refer to:

- Medigoxin
- Neokuguaglucoside
