= Datiscoside =

Datiscoside is any one of several chemical compounds isolated from certain plants, notably Datisca glomerata. They can be seen as derivatives of the triterpene hydrocarbon cucurbitane (C_{30}H_{54}), more specifically from cucurbitacin F.

They include:

- Datiscoside B, from D. glomerata
- Datiscoside D, from D. glomerata
- Datiscoside H, from D. glomerata
