= C23H26O7 =

The molecular formula C_{23}H_{26}O_{7} (molar mass : 414.454 g/mol) may refer to:

- Grayanic acid, a depsidone
- Neokadsuranin, a lignan
