= C30H40O6 =

The molecular formula C_{30}H_{40}O_{6} (molar mass: 496.63 g/mol, exact mass: 496.2825 u) may refer to:

- Absinthin
- Lepidolide
