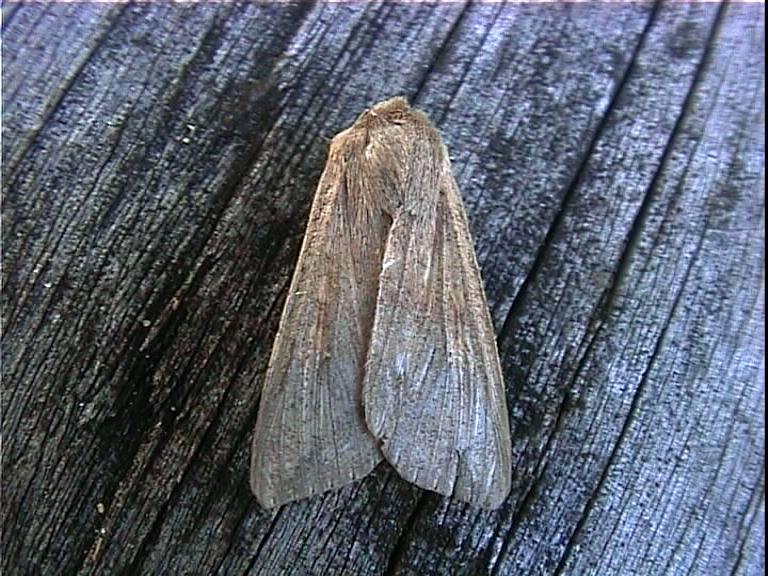

Scientific classification
- Domain: Eukaryota
- Kingdom: Animalia
- Phylum: Arthropoda
- Class: Insecta
- Order: Lepidoptera
- Superfamily: Noctuoidea
- Family: Noctuidae
- Genus: Mythimna
- Species: M. separata

Binomial name
- Mythimna separata Walker, 1865

Synonyms
- Leucania separata; Mythimna (Pseudaletia) separate; Leucania consimilis; Aletia unipuncta

= Mythimna separata =

Oriental armyworm

Species of moth

Mythimna separata, the northern armyworm, oriental armyworm or rice ear-cutting caterpillar, is a moth of the family Noctuidae. It is found in China, Japan, South-east Asia, India, eastern Australia, New Zealand, and some Pacific islands. It is one of the major pests of maize in Asia. The species was first described by Francis Walker in 1865.

== Etymology ==
The term "armyworm" is used because of their habit to spread out in a line across a lawn or pasture, and slowly "march" forward, consuming the foliage they encounter.

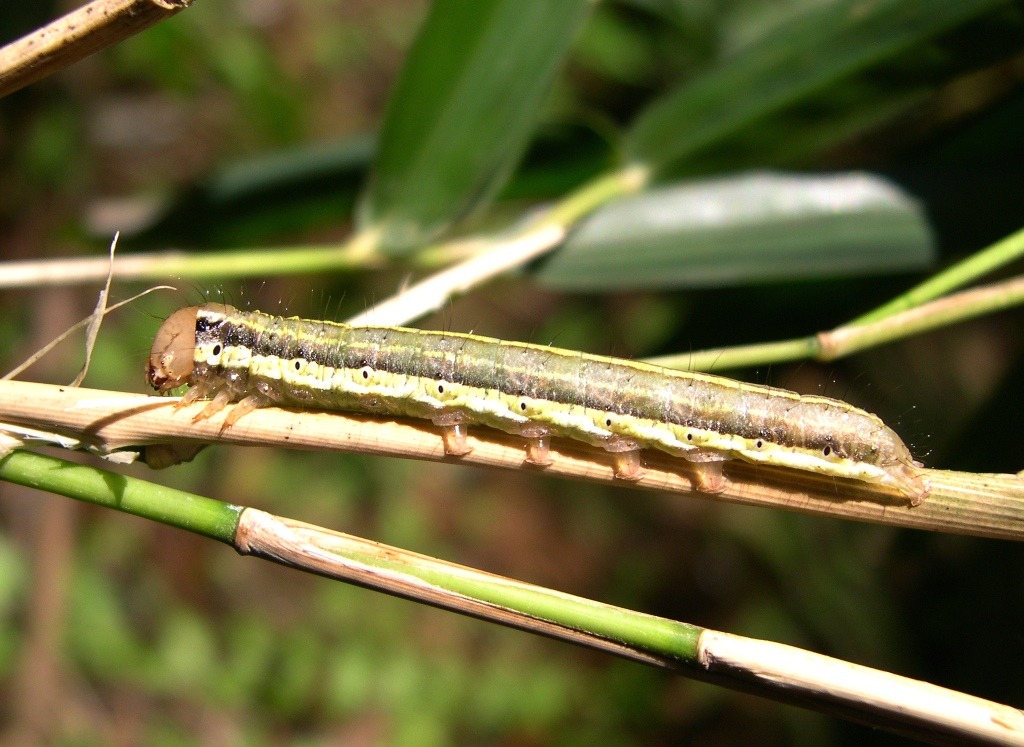
Caterpillar

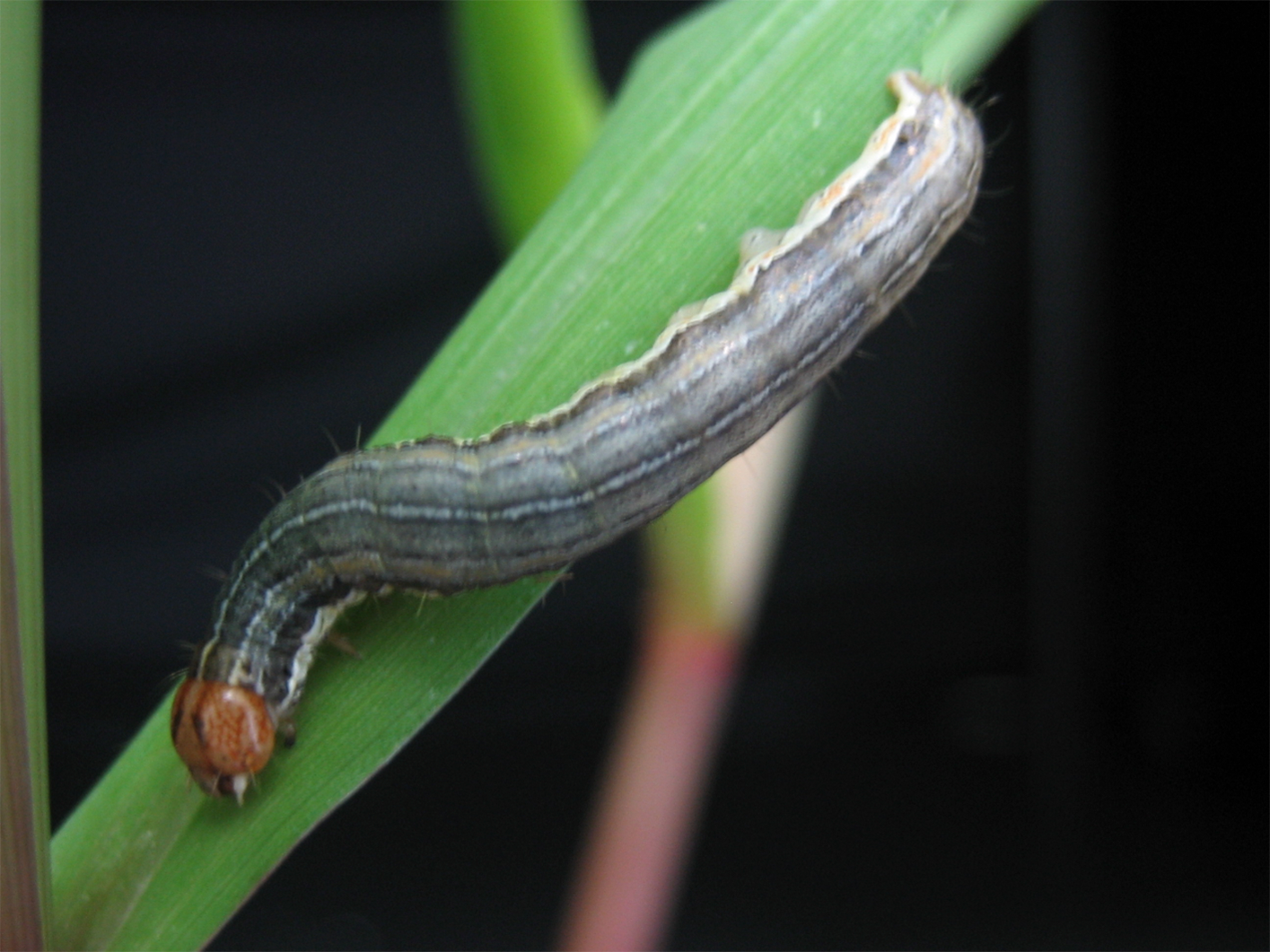
Plant volatiles released by corn plants may help the caterpillar avoid predators.

== Description ==
The wingspan is 35–50 mm. Males lack paired tufts on the basal segment of the abdomen below. The forewings are greyish yellow with a dark-grey or reddish-yellow tinge. The round and reniform spots are light or yellowish with indistinct edges, whereas reniform spot with white point at lower margin. External wing margin blackened obliquely from top backward, with dark stroke and with a row of dark points. Hindwings are grey, with dark external margin. Antennae thread like. Eggs are spherical and milky white with a thinly reticulate surface. Larvae usually have six instars, rarely seven. It reaching 40 mm in length at its last instar. Larva has two wide black-brown and one intermediate light dorsal stripe, with black-brown lateral stripe along spiracle line. spiracles brown with black rim. Pupae are yellowish brown and shiny.

== Ecology ==
The moth flies from January to April depending on the location. The larvae feed on a range of agricultural plants like Zea mays, Sorghum bicolor and Oryza sativa and are thus considered a pest. Caterpillars do not feed on Momordica charantia due to the presence of the triterpenoid glucoside called momordicine II, which is a natural inhibitor of caterpillar actions.

== Infestations ==
China experiences periodic outbreaks of northern armyworm infestation. The outbreak in 2012 was particularly severe.

== Control ==
Larva can be hand picked and adults can attracted using pheromones. Regulation of water level in the fields, and removal of alternate hosts from the field are also effective. Among biological controls, ducks are good; they can locate larvae hiding in the soil or at the base of plants easily and prey on them. Introduction of Cotesia ruficrus, and Eupteromalus parnarae also parasitized the larva. Selective pesticides and weedicides can also be used in the field. Integrated pest management methods undertaken by governments.

== See also ==
- African armyworm (Spodoptera exempta) (Africa)
- Common armyworm or true armyworm (Mythimna unipuncta) (North and South America)
- Fall armyworm (Spodoptera frugiperda) (North and South America)
