= C30H42O7 =

The molecular formula C_{30}H_{42}O_{7} (molar mass: 514.65 g/mol, exact mass: 514.2931 u) may refer to:

- Angustifodilactone
- Stigmatellin
