= Bryoamaride =

Names
- IUPAC name 2-(β-D-Glucopyranosyloxy)-16,20,25-trihydroxy-9-methyl-19-nor-9β,10α-lanosta-1,5-diene-3,11,22-trione
- Systematic IUPAC name (1R,2R,3aS,3bS,9aR,9bR,11aR)-1-[(2R)-2,6-Dihydroxy-6-methyl-3-oxoheptan-2-yl]-2-hydroxy-3a,6,6,9b,11a-pentamethyl-8-{[(2S,3R,4S,5S,6R)-3,4,5-trihydroxy-6-(hydroxymethyl)oxan-2-yl]oxy}-2,3,3a,3b,4,6,9a,9b,11,11a-decahydro-1H-cyclopenta[a]phenanthrene-7,10-dione
- Other names Cucurbitacin L 2-O-β-D-glucopyranoside

Identifiers
CAS Number	61105-51-9
3D model (JSmol)	Interactive image
ChemSpider	23264945
PubChem CID	44584115
UNII	88W3BYP3S8
CompTox Dashboard (EPA)	DTXSID30658770
- InChI: InChI=1S/C36H54O12/c1-31(2,45)12-11-23(39)36(8,46)28-19(38)14-33(5)22-10-9-17-18(35(22,7)24(40)15-34(28,33)6)13-20(29(44)32(17,3)4)47-30-27(43)26(42)25(41)21(16-37)48-30/h9,13,18-19,21-22,25-28,30,37-38,41-43,45-46H,10-12,14-16H2,1-8H3/t18-,19-,21-,22+,25-,26+,27-,28+,30-,33+,34-,35+,36+/m1/s1 Key: QCAZYVAEXLGYLV-HPCBBFKLSA-N
- SMILES: C[C@@]12C[C@H]([C@@H]([C@]1(CC(=O)[C@@]3([C@H]2CC=C4[C@H]3C=C(C(=O)C4(C)C)O[C@H]5[C@@H]([C@H]([C@@H]([C@H](O5)CO)O)O)O)C)C)[C@](C)(C(=O)CCC(C)(C)O)O)O

Properties
Chemical formula	C_{36}H_{54}O_{12}
Molar mass	678.816 g·mol^{−1}
- Except where otherwise noted, data are given for materials in their standard state (at 25 °C [77 °F], 100 kPa). verify (what is ?) Infobox references

Bryoamaride is a chemical compound isolated from certain plants, notably Bryonia dioica. It can be seen as a derivative of the triterpene hydrocarbon cucurbitane (C_{30}H_{54}), more specifically from cucurbitacin L or 23,24-dihydrocucurbitacin I.

The derivative 25-O-acetylbryoamaride is found in Trichosanthes tricuspidata.
