= C30H42O8 =

The molecular formula C_{30}H_{42}O_{8} may refer to:

- Angustifodilactone A, natural compounds isolated from Kadsura
- Proscillaridin, a cardiac glycoside
