= Endecaphyllacin =

Endecaphyllacin is either of two similar compounds found in certain plants, such as Hemsleya endecaphylla.

- Endecaphyllacin A, 2β-hydroxy-20,21,22,23,24,25,26,27-octanorcucurbita-5-ene-3,11,16-trione, C_{22}H_{30}O_{4}. Crystallizes with 1 molecule of methanol as colorless prisms, mp 207-209 °C;
- Endecaphyllacin B, 2-hydroxy-20,21,22,23,24,25,26,27-octanorcucurbita-1,5-dien-3,11,16-trione, C_{22}H_{28}O_{4}. It is the aglycon of khekadaengoside L from Trichosanthes tricuspidata. Crystallizes from methanol as colorless prisms, mp 229-231 °C

Endecaphyllacins A and B can be extracted from the dried tubers of Hemsleya endecaphylla with methanol, at concentrations 150 mg/72 g and 20 mg/72 g.
