= Perseapicroside =

Perseapicroside is any one of several chemical compounds isolated from certain plants, notably Persea mexicana. They can be seen as derivatives of the triterpene hydrocarbon cucurbitane (C_{30}H_{54}), more specifically from cucurbitacin F.

They include

- Perseapicroside A, from Persea mexicana.
