= Brydioside =

Chemical structure of brydioside A

Brydioside is any one of several chemical compounds isolated from certain plants, notably Bryonia dioica. They can be seen as derivatives of the triterpene hydrocarbon cucurbitane (C_{30}H_{54}), more specifically from cucurbitacin L (23,24-dihydrocucurbitacin I).

They include

- Brydioside A from Bryonia dioica
