= Khekadaengoside =

Khekadaengoside is any one of several chemical compounds isolated from certain plants, notably Trichosanthes tricuspidata. They can be seen as derivatives of the triterpene hydrocarbon cucurbitane (C_{30}H_{54}), more specifically from cucurbitacins H and L.

They include:

- Khekadaengoside A from T. tricuspidata
- Khekadaengoside B from T. tricuspidata
- Khekadaengoside D from the fruits of T. tricuspidata
- Khekadaengoside K from the fruits of T. tricuspidata
