= Neokuguaglucoside =

Names
- IUPAC name 6-(hydroxymethyl)-3-(2-methylprop-1-enyl)-2-[(1S)-1-[(1R,4S,5S,8R,9R,12S,13S,16S)-5,9,17,17-tetramethyl-16-[(2R,3R,4R,5S,6R)-3,4,5-trihydroxy-6-(hydroxymethyl)oxan-2-yl]oxy-18-oxapentacyclo[10.5.2.0^{1,13}.0^{4,12}.0^{5,9}]nonadec-2-en-8-yl]ethyl]-2,3,4a,6,7,8-hexahydropyrano[2,3-b][1,4]dioxine-7,8,8a-triol

Identifiers
| 3D model (JSmol) | Interactive image |
| PubChem CID | 57518367 |
| CompTox Dashboard (EPA) | DTXSID701029638 |
- InChI: InChI=1S/C42H66O14/c1-20(2)16-23-33(56-42(50)34(49)30(46)25(18-44)54-36(42)53-23)21(3)22-10-12-39(7)26-11-13-41-27(40(26,19-51-41)15-14-38(22,39)6)8-9-28(37(41,4)5)55-35-32(48)31(47)29(45)24(17-43)52-35/h11,13,16,21-36,43-50H,8-10,12,14-15,17-19H2,1-7H3/t21-,22+,23?,24+,25?,26-,27-,28-,29+,30?,31+,32+,33?,34?,35-,36?,38+,39-,40-,41+,42?/m0/s1 Key: JPQWDHPCZFTMSQ-BLIMDOIWSA-N
- SMILES: CC1(C)[C@@H](O[C@]2([H])O[C@H](CO)[C@@H](O)[C@@H](O)[C@H]2O)CC[C@]3([H])[C@]14C=C[C@]5([H])[C@@]3(CO4)CC[C@@]6(C)[C@@]5(C)CC[C@]6([H])[C@H](C)C7C(/C=C(C)/C)OC8C(C(O)C(O)C(CO)O8)(O)O7

Properties
| Chemical formula | C_{42}H_{66}O_{14} |
| Molar mass | 794.976 g·mol^{−1} |
| Appearance | White powder |
- Except where otherwise noted, data are given for materials in their standard state (at 25 °C [77 °F], 100 kPa). verify (what is ?) Infobox references

Neokuguaglucoside is a chemical compound with formula C_{42}H_{66}O_{14}, isolated from the fruit of the bitter melon vine (Momordica charantia, called kǔguā in Chinese), where it occurs at 23 mg/35 kg. It is a triterpene glucoside with the cucurbitane skeleton. It is a white powder, soluble in methanol and butanol.

== See also ==
- Kuguaglycoside
