= Scandenoside =

Chemical structure of scandenoside R1

Scandenoside is any one of several chemical compounds isolated from certain plants, notably Hemsleya panacis-scandens. They can be seen as derivatives of the triterpene hydrocarbon cucurbitane (C_{30}H_{54}), more specifically from cucurbitacin F.

They include:

- Scandenoside R9, from Hemsleya panacis-scandens.
