= Hemslecin =

Hemslecin is any of several compounds obtained from plants of the genus Hemsleya, which are used in Asian folk medicine. They are triterpene derivatives, specifically with the cucurbitane skeleton, related to cucurbitacin F.

The hemslecins include:

- Hemslecin A, 25-acetoxy-23,24-dihydrocucurbitacin F, from Hemsleya endecaphylla and from Helmseya amabilis
- Hemslecin B, 23,24-dihydrocucurbitacin F, from Hemsleya endecaphylla
- Hemslecin C, synthesized from hemslecin A
- Hemslecin D from Helmseya lijiangensis
- Hemslecin E from Helmseya lijiangensis
- Hemslecin F from Helmseya lijiangensis
- Hemslecin G from Helmseya gigantha

Hemslecins A and B have antibacterial properties, and have been proven to be effective against infectious diseases such as enteritis, bronchitis, acute tonsillitis, and bacillary dysentery.
