= Cucurbitacin E =

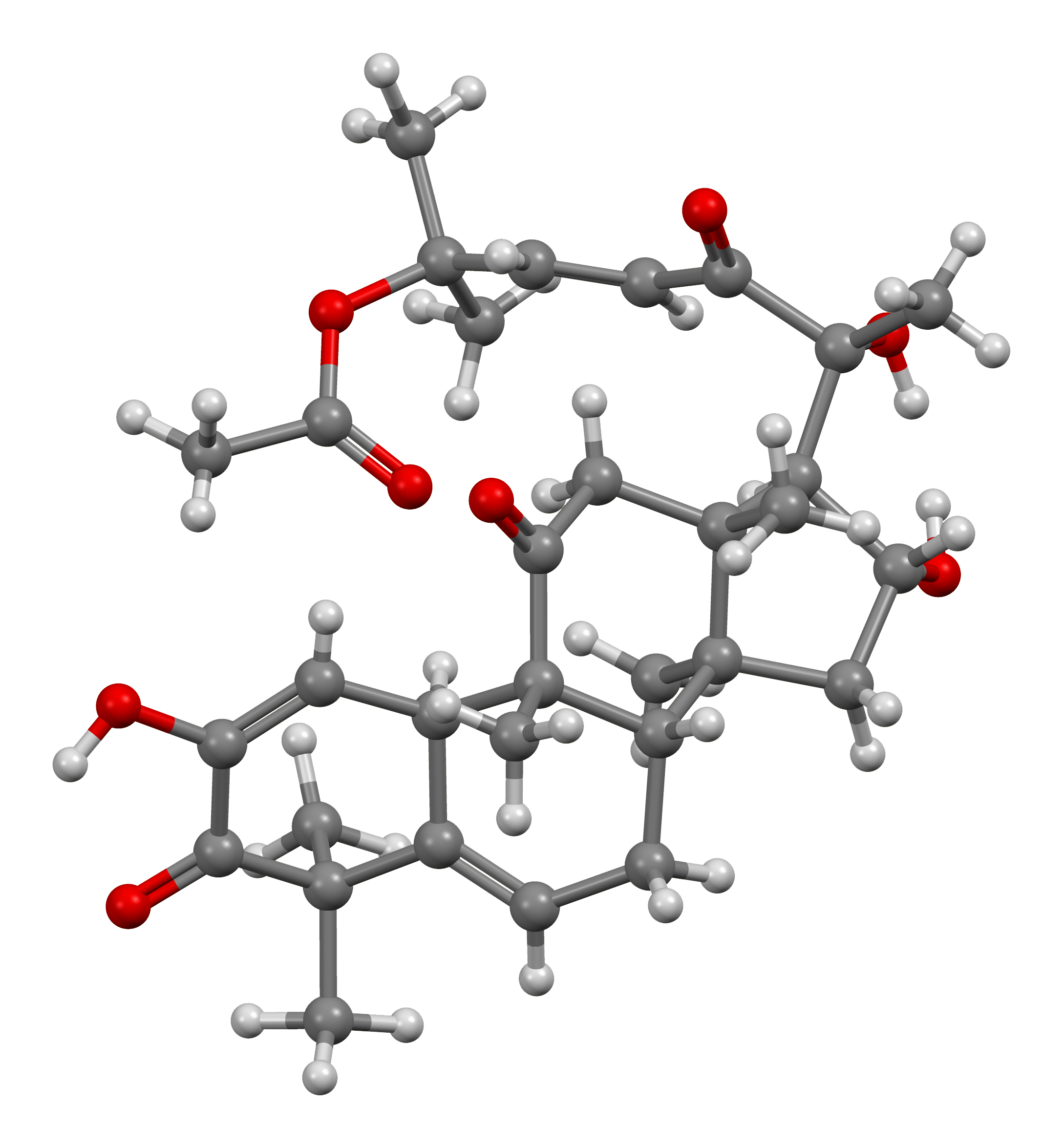

Names
- IUPAC name (23E)-2,16α,20-Trihydroxy-3,11,22-trioxo-19-nor-9β,10α-lanosta-1,5,23-dien-25-yl acetate
- Systematic IUPAC name (3E,6R)-6-[(1R,2R,3aS,3bS,9aR,9bR,11aR)-2,8-Dihydroxy-3a,6,6,9b,11a-pentamethyl-7,10-dioxo-2,3,3a,3b,4,6,7,9a,9b,10,11,11a-dodecahydro-1H-cyclopenta[a]phenanthren-1-yl]-2-methyl-5-oxohept-3-en-2-yl acetate

Identifiers
CAS Number	18444-66-1
3D model (JSmol)	Interactive image
ChemSpider	4444696
ECHA InfoCard	100.038.463
PubChem CID	5281319
UNII	V8A45XYI21
CompTox Dashboard (EPA)	DTXSID601030496
- InChI: InChI=1S/C32H44O8/c1-17(33)40-27(2,3)13-12-23(36)32(9,39)25-21(35)15-29(6)22-11-10-18-19(14-20(34)26(38)28(18,4)5)31(22,8)24(37)16-30(25,29)7/h10,12-14,19,21-22,25,34-35,39H,11,15-16H2,1-9H3/b13-12+/t19-,21-,22+,25+,29+,30-,31+,32+/m1/s1 Key: NDYMQXYDSVBNLL-MUYMLXPFSA-N; InChI=1/C32H44O8/c1-17(33)40-27(2,3)13-12-23(36)32(9,39)25-21(35)15-29(6)22-11-10-18-19(14-20(34)26(38)28(18,4)5)31(22,8)24(37)16-30(25,29)7/h10,12-14,19,21-22,25,34-35,39H,11,15-16H2,1-9H3/b13-12+/t19-,21-,22+,25+,29+,30-,31+,32+/m1/s1 Key: NDYMQXYDSVBNLL-MUYMLXPFBV
- SMILES: CC(=O)OC(C)(C)/C=C/C(=O)[C@@](C)([C@H]1[C@@H](C[C@@]2([C@@]1(CC(=O)[C@@]3([C@H]2CC=C4[C@H]3C=C(C(=O)C4(C)C)O)C)C)C)O)O

Properties
Chemical formula	C_{32}H_{44}O_{8}
Molar mass	556.696 g·mol^{−1}
Density	1.249 g/cm^{3}
Melting point	228 to 232 °C; 442 to 449 °F; 501 to 505 K
- Except where otherwise noted, data are given for materials in their standard state (at 25 °C [77 °F], 100 kPa). Infobox references

Cucurbitacin E is a biochemical compound from the family of cucurbitacins. These are found in plants which are member of the family Cucurbitaceae, most of them coming from traditional Chinese medicinal plants, but also in other plants such as pumpkins and gourds.

Cucurbitacin E is a highly oxidated steroid consisting of a tetracyclic triterpene. Specific modifications in this molecule under certain conditions can form other types of cucurbitacins such as cucurbitacin I, J, K and L.

As of 2020, it is being investigated for its potential biological effects. Cucurbitacin E has been found to increase activity of anti-cancer drugs in certain types of cancers. It selectively increases chemosensitivity of nutrient receptors, on or inside cancer cells, to anti-cancer drug molecules, thereby decreasing binding of the nutrients to cancer cells, and decreasing their growth, leading to selective cell death of cancer cells.

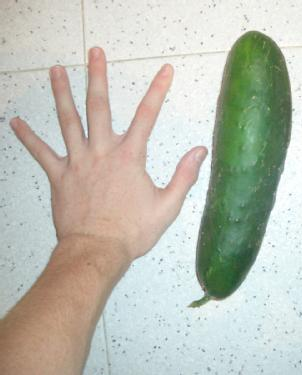
Cucumbers belong to the family Cucurbitaceae

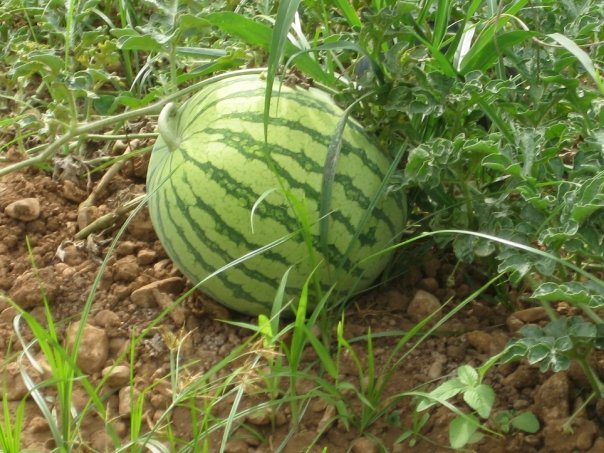
Watermelons are a rich source of cucurbitacin E

== Research ==
=== Anti-inflammatory ===
Cucurbitacin E anti-inflammatory activities are proved in vivo and in vitro. It is useful in the treatment of inflammation because of the inhibition of cyclooxygenase and reactive nitrogen species (RNS) but not reactive oxygen species (ROS).

Macrophages are responsible for the production of various cytokines, RNS and ROS, growth factors and chemokines as a response to activation signal such as chemical mediators, cytokines and lipopolysaccharide. Although these molecules have an important role, they can also have damaging effects, like some RNS. Cucurbitacin possesses dose-dependent anti-inflammatory activity related to its inhibition of nitric oxide (an RNS) production in macrophages without affecting the viability of these cells.

As cucurbitacin E doesn't affect normal human liver cells, it may have therapeutic potential and effective treatment for a variety of inflammation mediated diseases.

=== Antioxidant ===
Cucurbitacin E glycoside has demonstrated antioxidant and free-radical scavenging properties. Its antioxidant and free-radical scavenging properties were measured by the ability of cucurbitacin glycoside combination (CGC), a combination of cucurbitacin B and E glycosides, to reduce ABTS cation to its original form and also the capacity to inhibit MDA formation originated in the oxidation of linoleic acid. Using electron paramagnetic resonance, it was confirmed that CGC had antioxidant properties because of its capacity for scavenging free radicals, such as: superoxide anion (O2-), hydroxyl radical (OH-) and singlet oxygen. Not all natural antioxidants have strong free-radical scavenging properties against multiple free-radicals.

CGC is being investigated as a treatment for human diseases that are linked to oxidative or free-radical damage such as atherosclerosis, cancer, Alzheimer's disease and diabetes.

=== Cytostatic ===
Cucurbitacin E is an inhibitor during the S to M phase in the cell mitosis. It causes a reduction of cell multiplication.

=== Cytotoxicity ===
This triterpene can inhibit the phosphorylation of the cofilin protein, a family of actin-binding proteins that disassembles actin filaments.

Cucurbitacin E shows cytotoxicity to:

- The colon cancer cell line HCT-116
- The lung cancer cell line NCI-H460
- The breast cancer cell lines MCF-7 and ZR-75-1
- The central nervous system tumor cell line SF-268
- The oral epidermoid carcinoma cell line KB
- The cervical cancer cell line HeLa
- The fibrosarcoma cell line HT1080
- The acute leukemia cell lines U937 and HL-60
- The prostate cancer cell lines PC, LNCaP and DU145
- The pancreatic cancer cell line Panc-1
- The ovarian cancer cell line S-2
- The bladder cancer cell line T24
- The hepatic carcinoma cell lines BEL-7402 and HepG2

=== Anti-angiogenesis ===
Cucurbitacin can also inhibit VEGFR2-mediated Jak-STAT3 and MAPK signaling pathways. Anti-angiogenesis property of cucurbitacin E was demonstrated in vitro but also in vivo in a chick embryo chorioallantoic membrane and in a mouse corneal angiogenesis model.

=== Anti-invasion and anti-metastasis ===
In vitro, cucurbitacin E inhibits the adhesion of cancer cells in type I collagen.

=== Hepatoprotecive effect ===
In vitro, cucurbitacin E protects hepatocytes from CCl_{4} (carbon tetrachloride), by reducing GPT, GOT, ALP, TP and TBIL serums.

=== Insecticide ===
Curcurbitacin E has insecticidal effects against the aphid Aphis craccivora.

== See also ==
- Angiogenesis
- Hepatocyte
- Glycoside
- JAK-STAT signaling pathway
