= Spinoside =

Spinoside is any one of several chemical compounds isolated from certain plants, notably Desfontainia spinosa. They can be seen as derivatives of the triterpene hydrocarbon cucurbitane (C_{30}H_{54}), more specifically from cucurbitacin H.

They include

- Spinoside A, from D. spinosa
- Spinoside B, from D. spinosa
