= Charantoside =

Charantoside is any of several related cucurbitane triterpenoid glycosides found in the fruits bitter melon vine (Momordica charantia). They include:

- charantoside I, (19R,23E)-5β,19-Epoxy-19-methoxycucurbita-6,23,25-trien-3β-ol 3-O-β-D-glucopyranoside: amorphous solid.
- charantoside II, (19R,23R)-5β,19-Epoxy-19,23-dimethoxycucurbita-6,24-dien-3β-ol 3-O-β-D-allopyranoside: amorphous solid.
- charantoside III, (23E)-5β,19-Epoxycucurbita-6,23,25-trien-3β-ol 3-O-β-D-glucopyranoside: amorphous solid.
- charantoside IV, (23E)-5β,19-Epoxycucurbita-6,23,25-trien-3β-ol 3-O-β-D-allopyranoside: colorless needles, melting at 256–260 °C.
- charantoside V, (23R)-5β,19-Epoxy-23-methoxycucurbita-6,24-dien-3β-ol 3-O-β-D-glucopyranoside: colorless needles, melting at 235–240 °C.
- charantoside VI, (23S)-5β,19-Epoxy-23-methoxycucurbita-6,24-dien-3β-ol 3-O-β-D-allopyranoside: amorphous solid.
- charantoside VII, (23E)-3β-Hydroxycucurbita-6,23,25-trien-5β,19-olide 3-O-β-Dglucopyranoside: colorless needles, melting at 258–262 °C
- charantoside VIII, (23E)-3β-Hydroxy-7β,25-dimethoxycucurbita-5,23-dien-19-al 3-O-β-D-glucopyranoside: amorphous solid.

Charantosides I through VIII can be extracted from the fresh fruit with methanol and ethyl acetate.

== See also ==
- Charantin
- Goyaglycoside
- Karaviloside
- Momordicoside
