= Neokadsuranin =

Identifiers
| CAS Number | 163660-06-8 |
| 3D model (JSmol) | Interactive image |
| ChEMBL | ChEMBL485477 |
| ChemSpider | 20576743 |
| PubChem CID | 44575997 |
- InChI: InChI=1S/C23H26O7/c1-10-11(2)19-13-8-15-21(29-9-28-15)23(27-6)17(13)16-12(18(10)30-19)7-14(24-3)20(25-4)22(16)26-5/h7-8,10-11,18-19H,9H2,1-6H3/t10-,11+,18-,19+/m0/s1 Key: RNIZTMIJCBCDBR-XJSVZPCESA-N
- SMILES: C[C@@H]1[C@@H]([C@H]2C3=CC(=C(C(=C3C4=C(C5=C(C=C4[C@@H]1O2)OCO5)OC)OC)OC)OC)C

Properties
| Chemical formula | C_{23}H_{26}O_{7} |
| Molar mass | 414.454 g·mol^{−1} |
- Except where otherwise noted, data are given for materials in their standard state (at 25 °C [77 °F], 100 kPa). Infobox references

Neokadsuranin is a chemical compound isolated from Kadsura induta that has in vitro antiviral effects.

== See also ==
- Angustific acid
- Angustifodilactone
