= Momordol =

- Skeletal formula of momordol

Identifiers
CAS Number	189156-42-1
3D model (JSmol)	Interactive image
ChemSpider	35013084
PubChem CID	71308241
CompTox Dashboard (EPA)	DTXSID201029633
- InChI: InChI=1S/C26H48O5/c1-7-20(17-27)24(30)16-23(29)19(4)12-11-18(3)10-9-14-25(5)21(8-2)22(28)13-15-26(25,6)31/h13,15,18-21,23-24,27,29-31H,7-12,14,16-17H2,1-6H3 Key: HDAGCVMZABLHLE-UHFFFAOYSA-N
- SMILES: CCC(CO)C(O)CC(O)C(C)CCC(C)CCCC1(C)C(CC)C(=O)C=CC1(C)O

Properties
Chemical formula	C_{26}H_{48}O_{5}
Molar mass	440.665 g·mol^{−1}
Appearance	Liquid
- Except where otherwise noted, data are given for materials in their standard state (at 25 °C [77 °F], 100 kPa). Infobox references

Momordol or 1-hydroxy-1,2-dimethyl-2-[8′,10′-dihydroxy-4′,7′-dimethyl-11′-hydroxy methyl-trideca]-3-ethyl-cyclohex-5-en-4-one is a chemical compound with formula C_{26}H_{48}O_{5}, found in the fresh fruit of the bitter melon (Momordica charantia).

The compound is an oily liquid, soluble in ethyl acetate and methanol but not in pure chloroform or petrol. It was isolated in 1997 by S. Begum and others.

== See also ==
- Momordicin I
- Momordicin-28
- Momordicinin
- Momordicilin
- Momordenol
