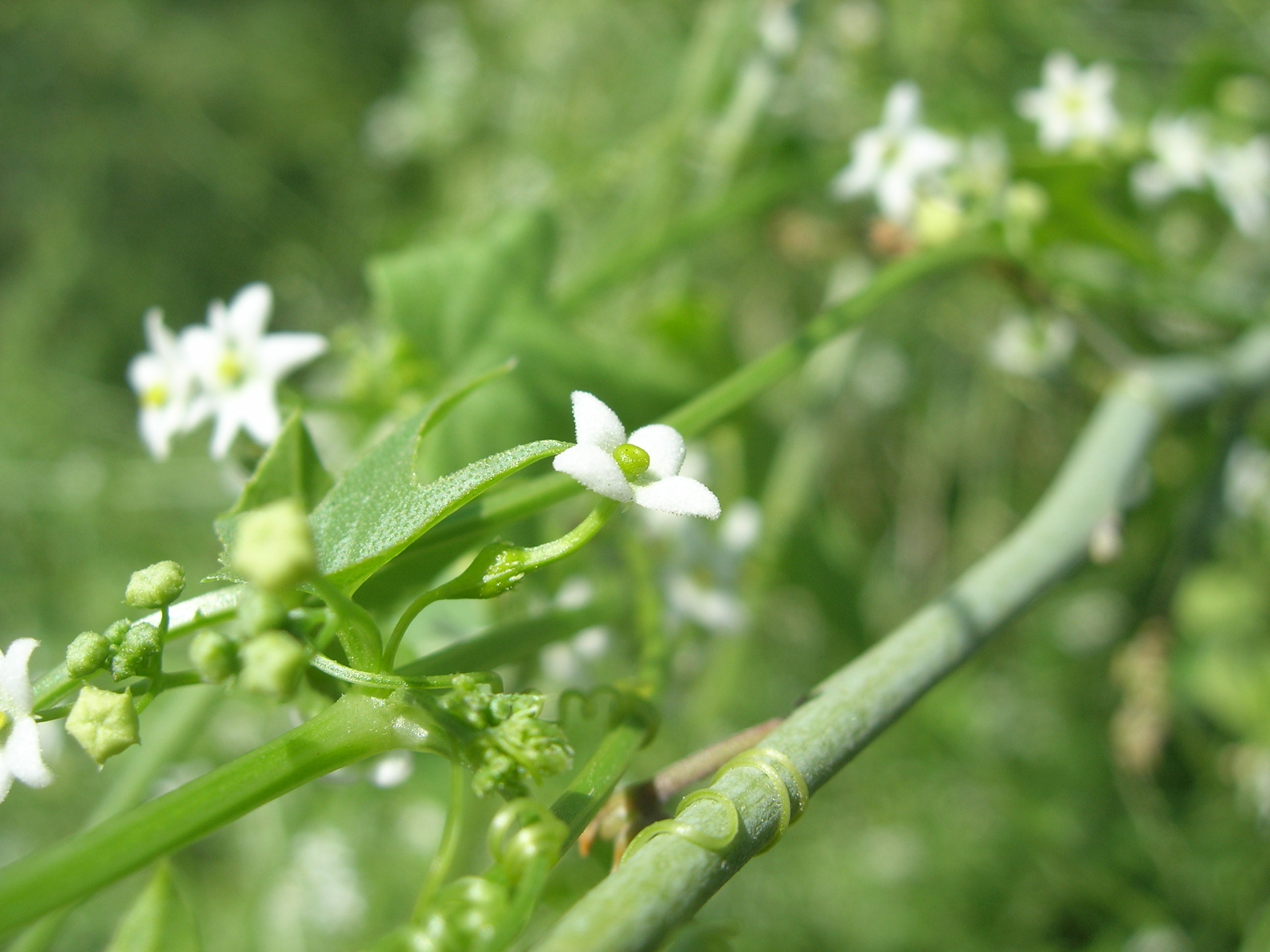
- Brandegea bigelovii

Conservation status
- Secure (NatureServe)

Scientific classification
- Kingdom: Plantae
- Clade: Tracheophytes
- Clade: Angiosperms
- Clade: Eudicots
- Clade: Rosids
- Order: Cucurbitales
- Family: Cucurbitaceae
- Subfamily: Cucurbitoideae
- Tribe: Sicyoeae
- Genus: Brandegea; Cogn.
- Species: B. bigelovii

Binomial name
- Brandegea bigelovii (S.Wats.) Cogn.

Synonyms
- Echinopepon bigelovii (S. Watson) S. Watson

= Brandegea =

Genus of flowering plants

Brandegea is a monotypic genus containing the single species Brandegea bigelovii, the desert starvine. This sprawling perennial vine in the squash family is native to the deserts of California, Arizona, and northern Mexico. The distinctive small, dark-green leaves are variable in shape but are usually a deeply lobed long-fingered palmate shape. They are heavily speckled with white oil glands. The vine bears tendrils, tiny five-pointed white flowers only 2 or 3 millimeters wide, and small, dry, prickly fruits 5 or 6 millimeters in length and holding a single seed. The plant grows from a deep taproot.

== Classification ==
Rank	Scientific name and Common Name
Kingdom	Plantae – Plants
Sub Kingdom	Tracheobionta – Vascular plants
Super Division	Spermatophyta – Seed plants
Division	Magnoliophyta – Flowering plants
Class	Magnoliopsida – Dicotyledons
Subclass	Dilleniidae
Order	Violales
Family	Cucurbitaceae – Cucumber family
Genus	Brandegea Cogn. – starvine
Species	Brandegea bigelovii (S. Watson) Cogn. – desert starvine
