= Momordicilin =

Names
- IUPAC name (4β)-23-[[(2E)-1-Hydroxy-1-methyl-2-penten-1-yl]oxy]-ursan-3-one

Identifiers
CAS Number	189156-40-9
3D model (JSmol)	Interactive image
ChemSpider	103882698
PubChem CID	102066427
CompTox Dashboard (EPA)	DTXSID601318014
- InChI: InChI=1S/C36H60O3/c1-10-11-17-36(9,38)39-23-33(6)27-15-20-35(8)28(32(27,5)19-16-29(33)37)13-12-26-30-25(3)24(2)14-18-31(30,4)21-22-34(26,35)7/h11,17,24-28,30,38H,10,12-16,18-23H2,1-9H3/b17-11+/t24-,25+,26-,27-,28-,30+,31-,32+,33-,34-,35-,36?/m1/s1 Key: UQBFECUQCTWGFC-RQSRHSMUSA-N
- SMILES: CC/C=C/C(C)(O)OC[C@@]1([C@@H]2CC[C@@]3([C@@H]([C@]2(CCC1=O)C)CC[C@H]4[C@]3(CC[C@@]5([C@H]4[C@H]([C@@H](CC5)C)C)C)C)C)C

Properties
Chemical formula	C_{36}H_{60}O_{3}
Molar mass	540.873 g·mol^{−1}
- Except where otherwise noted, data are given for materials in their standard state (at 25 °C [77 °F], 100 kPa). Infobox references

Momordicilin or 24-[1′-hydroxy,1′-methyl-2′-pentenyloxyl]-ursan-3-one is a chemical compound, a triterpenoid with formula C_{36}H_{60}O_{3}, found in the fresh fruit of the bitter melon (Momordica charantia).

The compound is soluble in ethyl acetate and chloroform but not in petrol. It crystallizes as needles that melt at 170−171 °C. It was isolated in 1997 by S. Begum and others.

== See also ==
- Momordicin I
- Momordicin-28
- Momordicinin
- Momordenol
- Momordol
