= Momordicinin =

Names
- IUPAC name 13,28-Epoxyurs-11-en-3-one
- Systematic IUPAC name (1S,2R,4aS,6aS,6bR,8aR,12aS,12bS,14aS,14bR)-1,2,6a,6b,9,9,12a-Heptamethyl-2H,10H-14a,4a-(epoxymethano)picen-10-one

Identifiers
CAS Number	128529-78-2
3D model (JSmol)	Interactive image
ChemSpider	10277031
PubChem CID	21669099
CompTox Dashboard (EPA)	DTXSID901318075
- InChI: InChI=1S/C30H46O2/c1-19-8-14-29-17-16-28(7)27(6)13-9-21-25(3,4)23(31)11-12-26(21,5)22(27)10-15-30(28,32-18-29)24(29)20(19)2/h10,15,19-22,24H,8-9,11-14,16-18H2,1-7H3/t19-,20+,21+,22-,24-,26+,27-,28+,29-,30+/m1/s1 Key: PKMBOLUTQNQQBP-MJFBQLCDSA-N
- SMILES: C[C@@H]1CC[C@]23CC[C@]4([C@@]5(CC[C@@H]6[C@@]([C@H]5C=C[C@@]4([C@@H]2[C@H]1C)OC3)(CCC(=O)C6(C)C)C)C)C

Properties
Chemical formula	C_{30}H_{46}O_{2}
Molar mass	438.696 g·mol^{−1}
Melting point	146–147 °C (295–297 °F; 419–420 K)
- Except where otherwise noted, data are given for materials in their standard state (at 25 °C [77 °F], 100 kPa). Infobox references

Momordicinin (13β,28-epoxy-urs-11-en-3-one) is chemical compound, a triterpene with formula C_{30}H_{46}O_{2}, found in the fresh fruit of the bitter melon (Momordica charantia).

The compound is soluble in ethyl acetate and chloroform but not in petrol. It crystallizes as irregular plates that melt at 146−147 °C. It was isolated in 1997 by S. Begum and others.

== See also ==
- Momordicin I
- Momordicin-28
- Momordicilin
- Momordenol
- Momordol
