= Momordicine =

A momordicine is any of several compounds found in the bitter melon vine, Momordica charantia. They are glycosides of cucurbitane derivatives. They include

- Momordicin I
- Momordicine II
- Momordicine III
- Momordicine IV, 7-O-D-glucopyranosyl-3,23-dihydroxycucurbita-5,24-dien-19-al
- Momordicine V, 3-[[(3S,7S,8S,9R,10R,13R,14S,17R)-9-formyl-7-hydroxy-4,4,13,14-tetramethyl-17-[(2R)-6-methyl-4-[(2R,3R,4S,5S,6R)-3,4,5-trihydroxy-6-(hydroxymethyl)oxan-2-yl]oxyhept-5-en-2-yl]-2,3,7,8,10,11,12,15,16,17-decahydro-1H-cyclopenta[a]phenanthren-3-yl]oxy]-3-oxopropanoic acid

Momordicine II and IV can be extracted from the leaves of M. charantia by methanol. They have been found to deter egg-laying of the leaf mining fly (Liriomyza trifolii) at a combined concentration of 96 μg/cm^{2}.

== See also ==
- Momordicin (disambiguation)
