= Karaviloside =

Karaviloside is any of several related cucurbitane triterpenoid glycosides found in bitter melon vine (Momordica charantia). They include:

- Karaviloside I
- Karaviloside II
- Karaviloside III
- Karaviloside V
- Karaviloside XI

Karavilosides I, II, and III can be extracted from the M. charantia fruit with methanol. Karavilosides III, V, and XI can be extracted from the M. charantia roots by methanol.

== See also ==
- Charantoside
- Goyaglycoside
- Kuguaglycoside
- Momordicoside
