= Angustific acid =

Angustific acids A and B
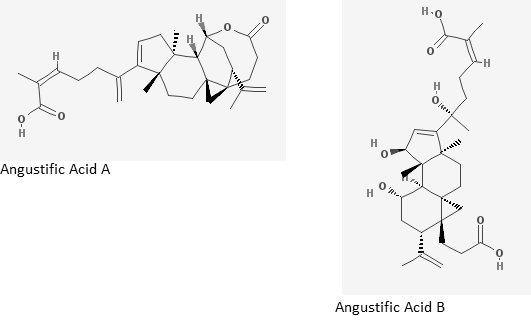

Names
- IUPAC names A:(2Z)-6-[(1R,3S,6S,10S,11S,12R,17R)-17-Isopropenyl-6,10-dimethyl-14-oxo-13-oxapentacyclo[10.4.2.0^{1,3}.0^{3,11}.0^{6,10}]octadec-7-en-7-yl]-2-methyl-2,6-heptadienoic acid B: (2Z,6S)-6-[(3S,3aS,3bR,4S,6S,6aR,7aS,9aS)-6a-(2-Carboxyethyl)-3,4-dihydroxy-6-isopropenyl-3a,9a-dimethyl-3a,3b,4,5,6,6a,7,8,9,9a-decahydro-3H-cyclopenta[a]cyclopropa[e]naphthalen-1-yl]-6-hydroxy-2-methyl-2-heptenoic acid

Identifiers
3D model (JSmol)	A: Interactive image; B: Interactive image
ChEMBL	A: ChEMBL1669428; B: ChEMBL1669429
ChemSpider	A: 26389056; B: 26387137
PubChem CID	A: 53325465; B: 51003481
- InChI: A: InChI=1S/C30H40O4/c1-18(2)22-16-23-25-28(6)12-10-21(19(3)8-7-9-20(4)26(32)33)27(28,5)14-15-30(25)17-29(22,30)13-11-24(31)34-23/h9-10,22-23,25H,1,3,7-8,11-17H2,2,4-6H3,(H,32,33)/b20-9-/t22-,23-,25+,27-,28+,29-,30+/m1/s1 Key: OEBCOPKBNAGZEV-PNVFSJBDSA-N; B: InChI=1S/C30H44O7/c1-17(2)19-14-20(31)24-28(6)22(32)15-21(27(5,37)10-7-8-18(3)25(35)36)26(28,4)12-13-30(24)16-29(19,30)11-9-23(33)34/h8,15,19-20,22,24,31-32,37H,1,7,9-14,16H2,2-6H3,(H,33,34)(H,35,36)/b18-8-/t19-,20-,22-,24-,26+,27-,28-,29+,30-/m0/s1 Key: MHUCDSJUECUYSY-OTEBZQEVSA-N
- SMILES: A: CC(=C)[C@H]1C[C@@H]2[C@H]3[C@@]4(CC=C([C@]4(CC[C@@]35[C@@]1(C5)CCC(=O)O2)C)C(=C)CC/C=C(/C)\C(=O)O)C; B: CC(=C)[C@@H]1C[C@@H]([C@H]2[C@@]3([C@H](C=C([C@]3(CC[C@@]24[C@@]1(C4)CCC(=O)O)C)[C@](C)(CC/C=C(/C)\C(=O)O)O)O)C)O

Properties
Chemical formula	A: C_{30}H_{40}O_{4} B:C_{30}H_{44}O_{7}
Molar mass	A: 464.64 g/mol B: 516.67 g/mol
- Except where otherwise noted, data are given for materials in their standard state (at 25 °C [77 °F], 100 kPa). Infobox references

Angustific acid A and angustific acid B are antiviral compounds isolated from Kadsura angustifolia. They are triterpenoids.

== See also ==
- Angustifodilactone
- Neokadsuranin
