= Magnolia thailandica =

Conservation status
- Vulnerable (IUCN 3.1)

Scientific classification
- Kingdom: Plantae
- Clade: Embryophytes
- Clade: Tracheophytes
- Clade: Spermatophytes
- Clade: Angiosperms
- Clade: Magnoliids
- Order: Magnoliales
- Family: Magnoliaceae
- Genus: Magnolia
- Subgenus: Magnolia subg. Magnolia
- Section: Magnolia sect. Kmeria
- Species: M. thailandica

Binomial name
- Magnolia thailandica Noot. & Chalermglin

Synonyms
- Kmeria thailandica (Noot. & Chalermglin) Q.Lin; Woonyoungia thailandica (Noot. & Chalermglin) N.H.Xia

Species of flowering plant

Magnolia thailandica is a species in the Kmeria section of the genus Magnolia found in Thailand.

(+)-Syringaresinol, a lignan, can be found in M. thailandica.
