= Momordicin-28 =

Names
- IUPAC name 13-Hydroxy-28-methoxyurs-11-en-3-one
- Systematic IUPAC name (4aR,6aR,6bS,8aS,11R,12S,12aR,12bS,14aR,14bS)-12b-Hydroxy-8a-(methoxymethyl)-4,4,6a,6b,11,12,14b-heptamethyl-1,4,4a,5,6,6a,6b,7,8,8a,9,10,11,12,12a,12b,14a,14b-octadecahydropicen-3(2H)-one
- Other names 13-Hydroxy-28-methoxy-urs-11-en-3-one

Identifiers
CAS Number	1392-51-4
3D model (JSmol)	Interactive image
ChemSpider	57566599
PubChem CID	57518366
UNII	BWR6B8CZ53
CompTox Dashboard (EPA)	DTXSID40727002
- InChI: InChI=1S/C31H50O3/c1-20-9-15-30(19-34-8)18-17-29(7)28(6)14-10-22-26(3,4)24(32)12-13-27(22,5)23(28)11-16-31(29,33)25(30)21(20)2/h11,16,20-23,25,33H,9-10,12-15,17-19H2,1-8H3/t20-,21+,22+,23-,25-,27+,28-,29+,30-,31+/m1/s1 Key: SQYPHCMLIZHTPW-LWIDLGQCSA-N
- SMILES: C[C@H]1[C@H](C)CC[C@]2(COC)CC[C@@]3(C)[C@]4(C)CC[C@@]5([H])C(C)(C)C(CC[C@]5(C)[C@@]4([H])C=C[C@]3(O)[C@@]21[H])=O

Properties
Chemical formula	C_{31}H_{50}O_{3}
Molar mass	470.738 g·mol^{−1}
Melting point	121 to 122 °C (250 to 252 °F; 394 to 395 K)
- Except where otherwise noted, data are given for materials in their standard state (at 25 °C [77 °F], 100 kPa). verify (what is ?) Infobox references

Momordicin-28 or 13-hydroxy-28-methoxy-urs-11-en-3-one is a triterpene compound with formula C_{31}H_{50}O_{3} found in the fresh fruit of the bitter melon (Momordica charantia).

The compound is soluble in ethyl acetate and chloroform but not in petrol. It crystallizes as fine needles that melt at 121−122 °C. It was isolated in 1997 by S. Begum and others.

== See also ==
- Momordicin I
- Momordicinin
- Momordicilin
- Momordenol
- Momordol
