= Momordicin I =

Names
- IUPAC name 3,7-dihydroxy-17-(4-hydroxy-6-methylhept-5-en-2-yl)-4,4,13,14-tetramethyl-2,3,7,8,10,11,12,15,16,17-decahydro-1H-cyclopenta[a]phenanthrene-9-carbaldehyde
- Other names 3,7,23-trihydroxycucurbitan-5,24-dien-19-al

Identifiers
CAS Number	91590-76-0
3D model (JSmol)	Interactive image
ChemSpider	74886432
PubChem CID	14807332
- InChI: InChI=1S/C30H48O4/c1-18(2)14-20(32)15-19(3)21-10-11-29(7)26-24(33)16-23-22(8-9-25(34)27(23,4)5)30(26,17-31)13-12-28(21,29)6/h14,16-17,19-22,24-26,32-34H,8-13,15H2,1-7H3 Key: QBXNBPFTVLJTMK-UHFFFAOYSA-N
- SMILES: CC(CC(O)C=C(C)C)C1CCC2(C)C3C(O)C=C4C(CCC(O)C4(C)C)C3(CCC12C)C=O CC1(C)C(O)CCC2C1=CC(O)C1C2(CCC2(C)C(CCC21C)C(C)CC(O)C=C(C)C)C=O

Properties
Chemical formula	C_{30}H_{48}O_{4}
Molar mass	472.710 g·mol^{−1}
Melting point	125–128 °C (257–262 °F; 398–401 K)
- Except where otherwise noted, data are given for materials in their standard state (at 25 °C [77 °F], 100 kPa). Infobox references

Momordicin I, or 3,7,23-trihydroxycucurbitan-5,24-dien-19-al, is a chemical compound found in the leaves of the bitter melon vine (Momordica charantia), possibly responsible for its reputed medicinal properties.

The compound was isolated and characterized in 1984 by M. Yasuda and others It is a white crystalline solid with formula C_{30}H_{48}O_{4}, that melts at 125–128 °C.

The compound can be extracted from ground dry leaves by dichloromethane. It is insoluble in water and soluble in methanol.

A related glycoside, momordicoside, occurs in the unripe fruit.

== See also ==
- Momordicin-28
- Momordicinin
- Momordicilin
- Momordenol
- Momordol
