= Lepidolide =

Names
- Preferred IUPAC name (2E,4E,6R)-6-[(3R,3aR,5aS,6S,10aR,10bS)-6-(3-Hydroxy-3-oxopropyl)-3a,5a,7,10b-tetramethyl-8-oxo-2,3,3a,4,5,5a,6,8,10a,10b-decahydro-1H-cyclopenta[7,8]naphtho[2,3-b]furan-3-yl]-2-methylhepta-2,4-dienoic acid

Identifiers
CAS Number	605664-52-6
3D model (JSmol)	Interactive image
ChemSpider	57566598
PubChem CID	57518365
UNII	TDZ7N42PMG
CompTox Dashboard (EPA)	DTXSID80727001
- InChI: InChI=1S/C30H40O6/c1-17(8-7-9-18(2)26(33)34)20-12-13-30(6)23-16-22-25(19(3)27(35)36-22)21(10-11-24(31)32)28(23,4)14-15-29(20,30)5/h7-9,16-17,20-21,23H,10-15H2,1-6H3,(H,31,32)(H,33,34)/b8-7+,18-9+/t17-,20-,21-,23-,28+,29-,30+/m1/s1 Key: XQPMQYSWONIJSL-UROXQCBESA-N
- SMILES: C[C@@]12[C@](CC[C@]2([H])[C@H](C)/C=C/C=C(C)/C(O)=O)(C)[C@]3([H])C=C4C([C@@H](CCC(O)=O)[C@]3(C)CC1)=C(C)C(O4)=O

Properties
Chemical formula	C_{30}H_{40}O_{6}
Molar mass	496.644 g·mol^{−1}
Appearance	Pale yellow oil
Solubility in chloroform	Soluble
- Except where otherwise noted, data are given for materials in their standard state (at 25 °C [77 °F], 100 kPa). verify (what is ?) Infobox references

Lepidolide is a chemical compound with formula C_{30}H_{40}O_{6} — specifically, a terpenoid with the cucurbitane skeleton — isolated from the fruiting bodies of the mushroom Russula lepida (23 mg/7 kg). It is a pale yellow oil, soluble in chloroform.
