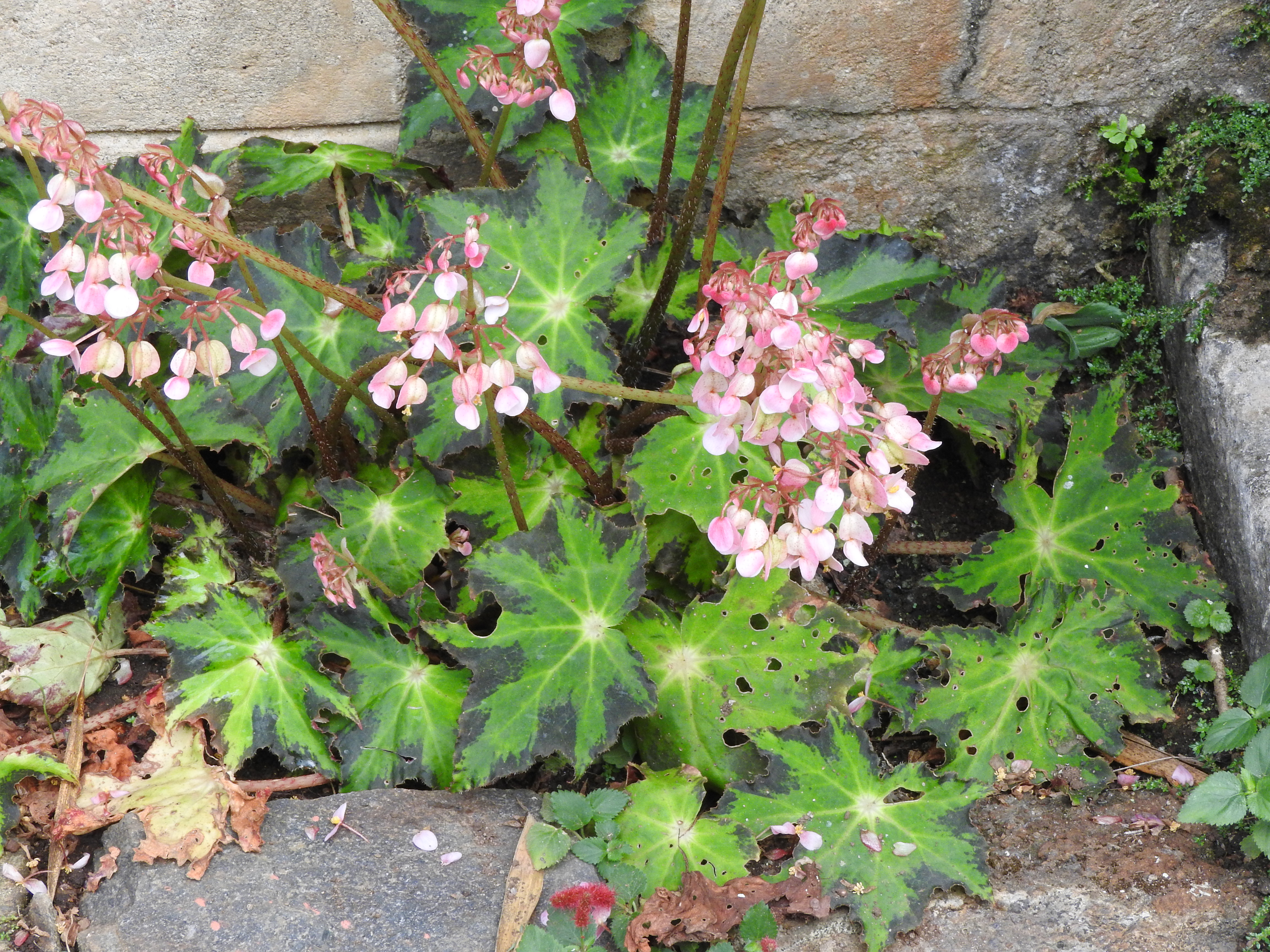
- In a garden setting in India

Scientific classification
- Kingdom: Plantae
- Clade: Tracheophytes
- Clade: Angiosperms
- Clade: Eudicots
- Clade: Rosids
- Order: Cucurbitales
- Family: Begoniaceae
- Genus: Begonia
- Species: B. heracleifolia

Binomial name
- Begonia heracleifolia Schltdl. & Cham.

Synonyms
- List: Begonia heracleifolia var. longipila (Lem.) A.DC.; Begonia heracleifolia var. nigricans Hook.f.; Begonia heracleifolia f. punctata (Klotzsch) Voss; Begonia heracleifolia var. sunderbruckii C.Chev.; Begonia jatrophifolia Klotzsch; Begonia longipila Lem.; Begonia punctata Klotzsch; Begonia radiata Graham; Begonia tanacetifolia Steud.; Begonia trigonoptera Sprague; Eupetalum punctatum (Klotzsch) Paxton; Gireoudia heracleifolia (Schltdl. & Cham.) Klotzsch; Gireoudia heracleifolia var. punctata (Klotzsch) Klotzsch; Gireoudia heracleifolia var. viridis Klotzsch; Gireoudia punctata (Klotzsch) Klotzsch

= Begonia heracleifolia =

Species of flowering plant

Begonia heracleifolia, the star begonia, is a species of flowering plant in the family Begoniaceae. It is native to Mexico and northern Central America, and has been introduced to Cuba, Hispaniola, Puerto Rico, and Trinidad and Tobago. A widespread species that is adapted to drought, it possesses considerable genetic and morphological variation, particularly in leaf shape and patterning.
