= Angustifodilactone =

Angustifodilactone A

Names
- IUPAC name (1S,3aS,3bS,5S,5aS,10aS,11aR,13S,13aR)-5,13-Dihydroxy-1-{(1R)-1-hydroxy-1-[(2R)-5-(hydroxymethyl)-6-oxo-3,6-dihydro-2H-pyran-2-yl]ethyl}-3a,6,6,13a-tetramethyl-1,2,3,3a,3b,4,5,5a,6,12,13,13a-dodecahydro-8H-cyclopenta[5,6]cyclopropa[1,8a]naphtho[2,1-c]oxepin-8-one

Identifiers
3D model (JSmol)	Interactive image
ChEMBL	ChEMBL1669430
ChemSpider	26385852
PubChem CID	51003490
CompTox Dashboard (EPA)	DTXSID501336043
- InChI: InChI=1S/C30H42O8/c1-25(2)23-17(32)12-19-26(3)10-8-18(28(5,36)21-7-6-16(14-31)24(35)37-21)27(26,4)20(33)13-30(19)15-29(23,30)11-9-22(34)38-25/h6,9,11,17-21,23,31-33,36H,7-8,10,12-15H2,1-5H3/t17-,18-,19-,20-,21+,23-,26-,27-,28+,29+,30-/m0/s1 Key: AGZMSHUZAZHKKN-LDUYZNKBSA-N; Key: QCYCYOUXODNCMX-LDUYZNKBSA-N
- SMILES: C[C@@]12CC[C@@H]([C@]1([C@H](C[C@]34[C@H]2C[C@@H]([C@@H]5[C@]3(C4)C=CC(=O)OC5(C)C)O)O)C)[C@](C)([C@H]6CC=C(C(=O)O6)CO)O

Properties
Chemical formula	C_{30}H_{42}O_{8}
Molar mass	530.658 g·mol^{−1}
- Except where otherwise noted, data are given for materials in their standard state (at 25 °C [77 °F], 100 kPa). Infobox references

Angustifodilactone B

Names
- IUPAC name (1S,3aS,3bS,5S,5aS,10aS,11aR,13S,13aR)-5,13-Dihydroxy-1-{(1R)-1-hydroxy-1-[(2R)-5-methyl-6-oxo-3,6-dihydro-2H-pyran-2-yl]ethyl}-3a,6,6,13a-tetramethyl-1,2,3,3a,3b,4,5,5a,6,12,13,13a-dodecahydro-8H-cyclopenta[5,6]cyclopropa[1,8a]naphtho[2,1-c]oxepin-8-one

Identifiers
3D model (JSmol)	Interactive image
ChEMBL	ChEMBL1669431
ChemSpider	26387521
PubChem CID	51003491
CompTox Dashboard (EPA)	DTXSID001336050
- InChI: InChI=1S/C30H42O7/c1-16-7-8-21(36-24(16)34)28(6,35)18-9-11-26(4)19-13-17(31)23-25(2,3)37-22(33)10-12-29(23)15-30(19,29)14-20(32)27(18,26)5/h7,10,12,17-21,23,31-32,35H,8-9,11,13-15H2,1-6H3/t17-,18-,19-,20-,21+,23-,26-,27-,28+,29+,30-/m0/s1 Key: QCYCYOUXODNCMX-LDUYZNKBSA-N
- SMILES: CC1=CC[C@@H](OC1=O)[C@@](C)([C@H]2CC[C@@]3([C@@]2([C@H](C[C@]45[C@H]3C[C@@H]([C@@H]6[C@]4(C5)C=CC(=O)OC6(C)C)O)O)C)C)O

Properties
Chemical formula	C_{30}H_{42}O_{7}
Molar mass	514.659 g·mol^{−1}
- Except where otherwise noted, data are given for materials in their standard state (at 25 °C [77 °F], 100 kPa). Infobox references

Angustifodilactones are natural compounds isolated from Kadsura and showing some activity against HIV in the cell culture.

== See also ==
- Angustific acid
- Neokadsuranin
