= Momordenol =

Names
- IUPAC name 3β-Hydroxystigmasta-5,14-dien-16-one
- Systematic IUPAC name (1R,3bR,7S,9aR,9bS,11aR)-1-[(2R,5R)-5-Ethyl-6-methylheptan-2-yl]-7-hydroxy-9a,11a-dimethyl-1,3b,4,6,7,8,9,9a,9b,10,11,11a-dodecahydro-2H-cyclopenta[a]phenanthren-2-one

Identifiers
CAS Number	189156-41-0
3D model (JSmol)	Interactive image
ChemSpider	103884462
PubChem CID	102066428
CompTox Dashboard (EPA)	DTXSID701274786
- InChI: InChI=1S/C29H46O2/c1-7-20(18(2)3)9-8-19(4)27-26(31)17-25-23-11-10-21-16-22(30)12-14-28(21,5)24(23)13-15-29(25,27)6/h10,17-20,22-24,27,30H,7-9,11-16H2,1-6H3/t19-,20-,22+,23-,24+,27+,28+,29+/m1/s1 Key: MEWYFWRPPPAWSI-BDZSUDIQSA-N
- SMILES: CC[C@H](CC[C@@H](C)[C@H]1C(=O)C=C2[C@@]1(CC[C@H]3[C@H]2CC=C4[C@@]3(CC[C@@H](C4)O)C)C)C(C)C

Properties
Chemical formula	C_{29}H_{46}O_{2}
Molar mass	426.685 g·mol^{−1}
Melting point	160 °C (320 °F; 433 K)
- Except where otherwise noted, data are given for materials in their standard state (at 25 °C [77 °F], 100 kPa). Infobox references

Momordenol (3β-hydroxy-stigmasta-5,14-dien-16-one) is a natural chemical compound, a sterol found in the fresh fruit of the bitter melon (Momordica charantia).

The compound is soluble in ethyl acetate and methanol but not in pure chloroform or petrol. It crystallizes as fine needles that melt at 160–161 °C. It was isolated in 1997 by S. Begum and others.

== See also ==
- Momordicilin
- Momordicin I
- Momordicin-28
- Momordicinin
- Momordol
- Stigmasterol
