= Cucurbitacin D =

Names
- IUPAC name (23E)-2β,16α,20,25-Tetrahydroxy-9-methyl-19-nor-9β,10α-lanosta-5,23-diene-3,11,22-trione
- Systematic IUPAC name (1R,2R,3aS,3bS,8S,9aR,9bR,11aR)-1-[(2R,4E)-2,6-Dihydroxy-6-methyl-3-oxohept-4-en-2-yl]-2,8-dihydroxy-3a,6,6,9b,11a-pentamethyl-2,3,3a,3b,4,6,8,9,9a,9b,11,11a-dodecahydro-1H-cyclopenta[a]phenanthrene-7,10-dione
- Other names Elatericin A

Identifiers
CAS Number	3877-86-9
3D model (JSmol)	Interactive image
ChEMBL	ChEMBL493646
ChemSpider	4444695
ECHA InfoCard	100.211.825
PubChem CID	5281318
UNII	5I62H4ORC7
CompTox Dashboard (EPA)	DTXSID401032034
- InChI: InChI=1S/C30H44O7/c1-25(2,36)12-11-21(33)30(8,37)23-19(32)14-27(5)20-10-9-16-17(13-18(31)24(35)26(16,3)4)29(20,7)22(34)15-28(23,27)6/h9,11-12,17-20,23,31-32,36-37H,10,13-15H2,1-8H3/b12-11+/t17-,18+,19-,20+,23+,27+,28-,29+,30+/m1/s1 Key: SRPHMISUTWFFKJ-QJNWWGCFSA-N; InChI=1/C30H44O7/c1-25(2,36)12-11-21(33)30(8,37)23-19(32)14-27(5)20-10-9-16-17(13-18(31)24(35)26(16,3)4)29(20,7)22(34)15-28(23,27)6/h9,11-12,17-20,23,31-32,36-37H,10,13-15H2,1-8H3/b12-11+/t17-,18+,19-,20+,23+,27+,28-,29+,30+/m1/s1 Key: SRPHMISUTWFFKJ-QJNWWGCFBO
- SMILES: C[C@@]12C[C@H]([C@@H]([C@]1(CC(=O)[C@@]3([C@H]2CC=C4[C@H]3C[C@@H](C(=O)C4(C)C)O)C)C)[C@](C)(C(=O)/C=C/C(C)(C)O)O)O

Properties
Chemical formula	C_{30}H_{44}O_{7}
Molar mass	516.675 g·mol^{−1}
- Except where otherwise noted, data are given for materials in their standard state (at 25 °C [77 °F], 100 kPa). Infobox references

Cucurbitacin D is a plant triterpene first identified in plants in the family Cucurbitaceae. In preliminary in vitro studies, it has shown inhibitory properties against endometrial and ovarian cancer cell lines.
