= Kuguaglycoside =

Chemical structure of kuguaglycoside A

A kuguaglycoside is one of several chemical compounds (cucurbitane triterpenoid glycosides) isolated from the roots of the bitter melon vine (Momordica charantia, kǔguā in Chinese) by J.-C. Chen and others.

Kuguaglycosides are glycosides of triterpene derivatives, with the cucurbitane skeleton. They are colorless solids, soluble in methanol, ethyl acetate, and butanol. They include:

- Kuguaglycoside A: 3β-hydroxy-7β-methoxycucurbita-5,24-dien-23-yl β-glucopyranoside, C_{37}H_{62}O_{8}
- Kuguaglycoside B: 3β-hydroxy-25-methoxycucurbita-5,23-dien-7β-yl β-glucopyranoside, C_{37}H_{62}O_{8}
- Kuguaglycoside C: 7β-(β-glucopyranosyloxy)-3β-hydroxycucurbita-5,23,25-trien-19-al, C_{36}H_{56}O_{8} (colorless needles)
- Kuguaglycoside D: 3β,19,23-trihydroxycucurbita-5,24-dien-7β-yl β-glucopyranoside, C_{36}H_{60}O_{9}
- Kuguaglycoside E: 23-(β-glucopyranosyloxy)-3β,19-dihydroxycucurbita-5,24-dien-7β-yl β-glucopyranoside, C_{42}H_{70}O_{14}
- Kuguaglycoside F: 23-(β-glucopyranosyloxy)-7β-methoxycucurbita-5,24-dien-3β-yl β-allopyranoside, C_{43}H_{72}O_{13}
- Kuguaglycoside G: 23-(β-glucopyranosyloxy)-3β-hydroxycucurbita-5,24-dien-7β-yl β-glucopyranoside, C_{42}H_{70}O_{13}
- Kuguaglycoside H: 23-(β-glucopyranosyl(1→2)-β-glucopyranosyl)-3β-hydroxycucurbita-5,24-dien-7β-yl β-glucopyranoside, C_{48}H_{80}O_{18} (colorless needles)

Kuguaglycoside B is also found in the fruit of M. charantia.
