= Goyaglycoside =

Goyaglycoside is any of several related triterpenoid glycosides found in the fruits of the bitter melon vine (Momordica charantia), called goya in Okinawan language. They include:

- goyaglycoside c.
- goyaglycoside d.

Goyaglycosides c and d can be extracted from the fresh fruit with methanol and ethyl acetate.

== See also ==
- Charantoside
- Karaviloside
- Momordicoside
