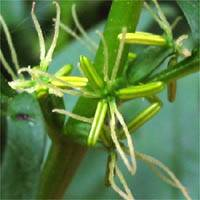

Scientific classification
- Kingdom: Plantae
- Clade: Tracheophytes
- Clade: Angiosperms
- Clade: Eudicots
- Clade: Rosids
- Order: Cucurbitales
- Family: Datiscaceae
- Genus: Datisca
- Species: D. glomerata

Binomial name
- Datisca glomerata (C.Presl) Baill.

= Datisca glomerata =

Species of flowering plant

Datisca glomerata is a species of plant native to California, Nevada, and Baja California known by the common name Durango root. It is one of only two to four species in the plant family Datiscaceae. It is an erect perennial herb with distinctive long, pointed, often sharply serrated leaves. It is said to superficially resemble Cannabis species. Its yellowish green flowers grow in clusters from the axilla of the leaf, where it joins the stem. A thick stand of the plant can form a medium-sized bush. All parts of this plant are toxic and in some areas, it is considered a noxious weed. It is reported to be poisonous to cattle.

It is also one of a rare group of androdioecious species.
