= Momordicoside =

Chemical structure of momordicoside A

Momordicoside is any of several related cucurbitane triterpenoid glycosides that can be extracted from the bitter melon vine (Momordica charantia). They include:

- Momordicoside A
- Momordicoside B
- momordicoside F_{1}
- momordicoside F_{2}
- Momordicoside K
- Momordicoside L
- Momordicoside M
- Momordicoside N
- Momordicoside S

Momordicosides A, B, F_{1}, F_{2} K–N, and S can be extracted from the fruit with methanol.

== See also ==
- Charantoside
- Goyaglycoside
- Karaviloside
