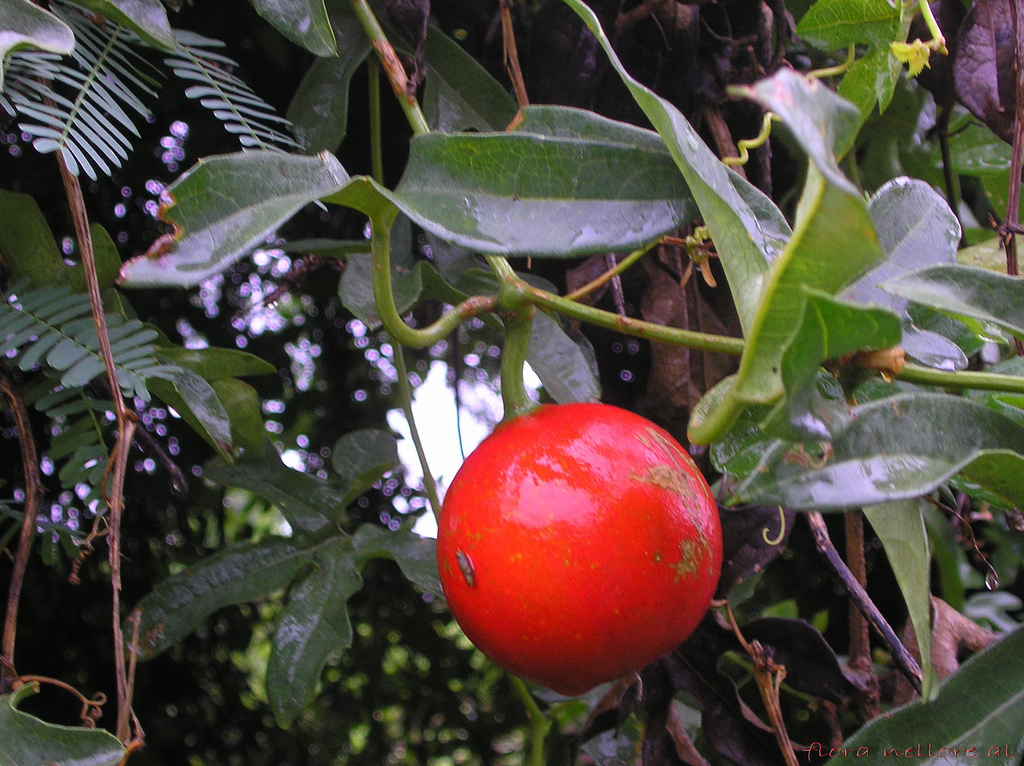
- T. tricuspidata fruit
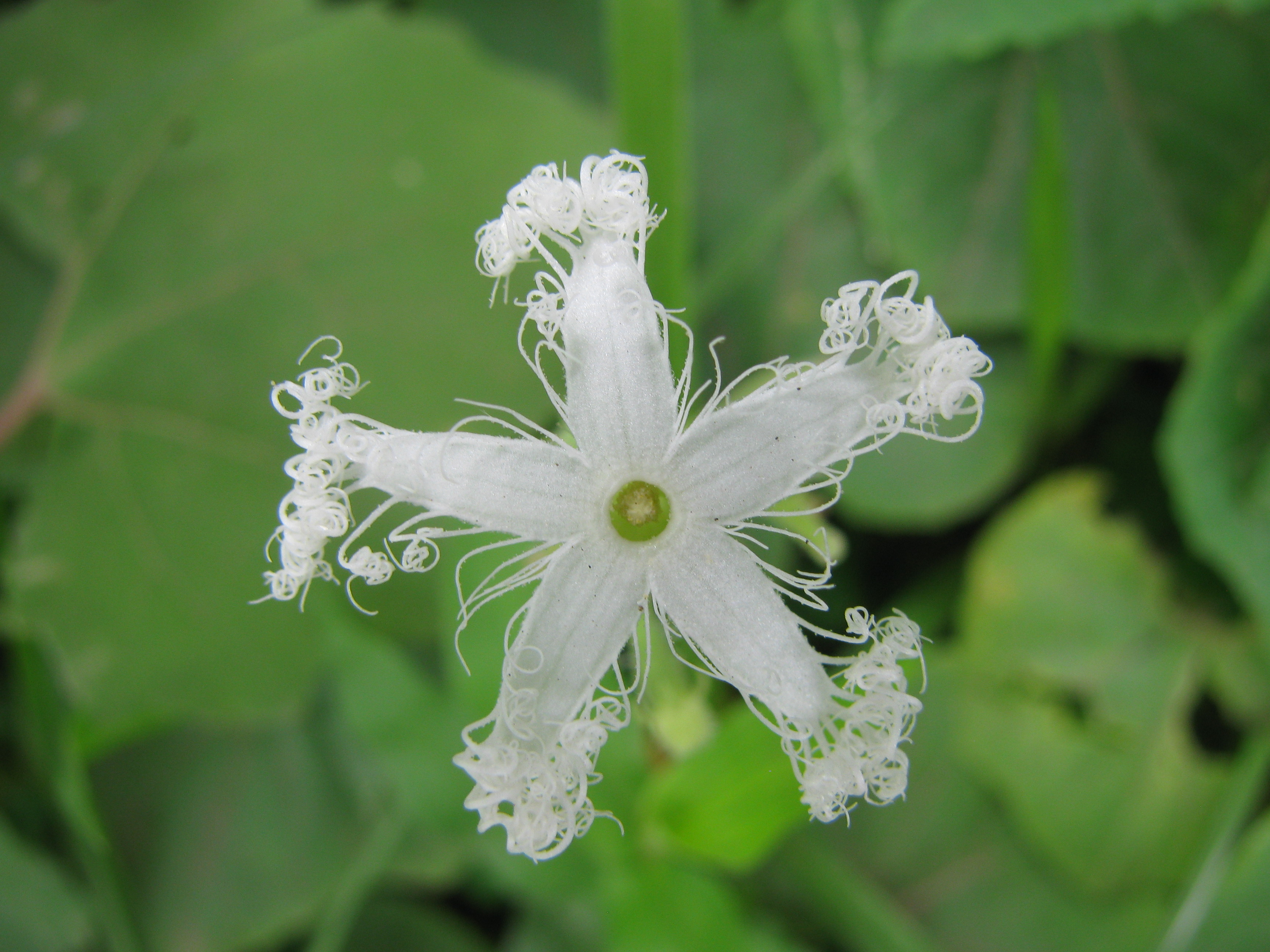
- Flower

Scientific classification
- Kingdom: Plantae
- Clade: Tracheophytes
- Clade: Angiosperms
- Clade: Eudicots
- Clade: Rosids
- Order: Cucurbitales
- Family: Cucurbitaceae
- Genus: Trichosanthes
- Species: T. tricuspidata

Binomial name
- Trichosanthes tricuspidata Lour.

Synonyms
- Anguina tricuspidata (Lour.) Kuntze

= Trichosanthes tricuspidata =

Species of flowering plant

Trichosanthes tricuspidata is a species of flowering plant in the family Cucurbitaceae. It is a climbing plant native to the Andaman Islands, Borneo, Cambodia, Indonesia, Java, Laos, the Lesser Sunda Islands, Malaysia, Myanmar, the Nicobar Islands, Sulawesi, Thailand, and Vietnam.

== Subspecies ==
The following subspecies are listed in the Catalogue of Life:

- T. t. asperifolia
- T. t. seramensis
- T. t. siberutensis
- T. t. javanica
- T. t. rotundata
- T. t. tricuspidata
- T. t. flavofila
- T. t. strigosa
- T. t. tomentosa

== Gallery ==
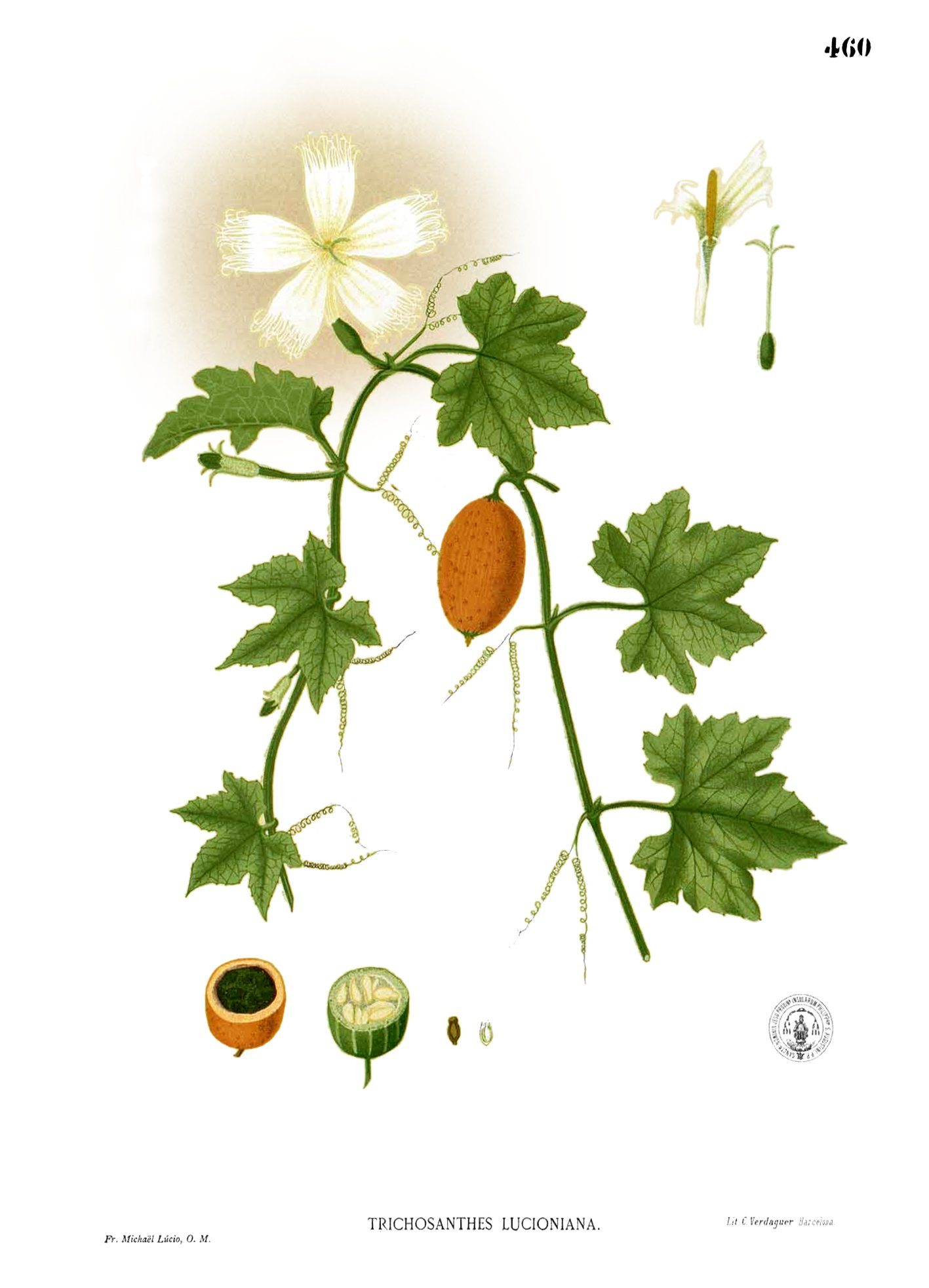

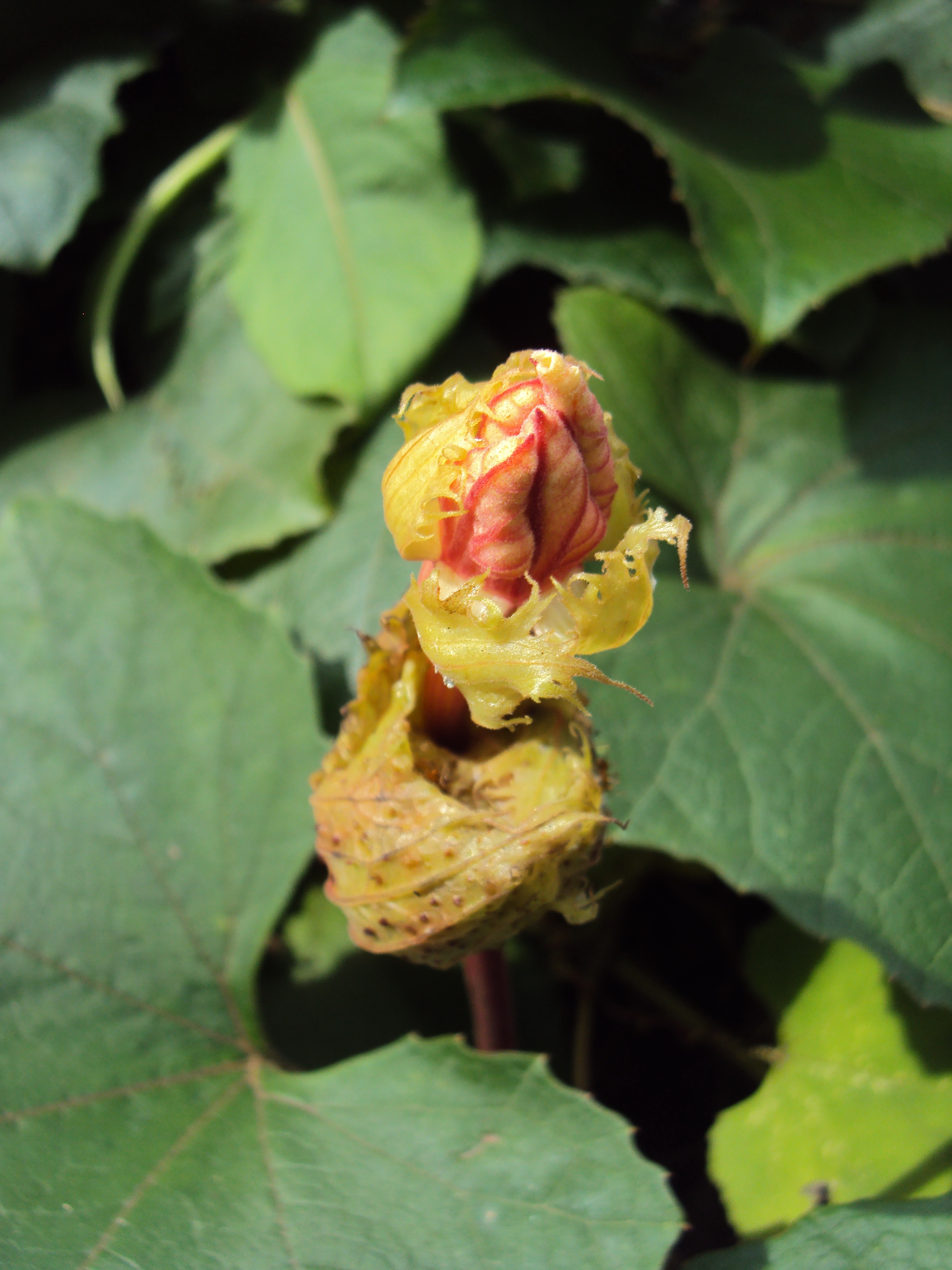
T. tricuspidata var. tomentosa (near Mananthavady, India)
