= Quercetin-3-sulfate 3'-sulfotransferase =

Class of enzymes

Identifiers
- EC no.: 2.8.2.26
- CAS no.: 121855-11-6

Databases
- BRENDA: enzyme data
- ExPASy: NiceZyme view
- KEGG: enzyme entry
- MetaCyc: metabolic pathway
- Rhea: reactions
- PDB structures: RCSB PDB PDBe PDBsum
- Gene Ontology: AmiGO / QuickGO
Search
- PMC: articles
- PubMed: articles
- NCBI: proteins

Quercetin-3-sulfate 3'-sulfotransferase (EC 2.8.2.26) is an enzyme that catalyzes the chemical reaction

quercetin 3-O-sulfate
+ PAPS
quercetin 3,3'-bissulfate
+ adenosine 3',5'-
bisphosphate

It uses the cofactor 3'-phosphoadenosine-5'-phosphosulfate (PAPS) to transfer a sulfate group and gives adenosine 3',5'-bisphosphate as a byproduct. The enzyme characterised from Flaveria chlorifolia converts quercetin 3-O-sulfate to quercetin 3,3'-bissulfate. The starting material is produced from quercetin by a similar reaction catalysed by the enzyme flavonol 3-sulfotransferase.

This enzyme is transferase, specifically a sulfotransferases, which transfer sulfur-containing groups. The systematic name of this enzyme class is 3'-phosphoadenylyl-sulfate:quercetin-3-sulfate 3'-sulfotransferase. Other names in common use include flavonol 3'-sulfotransferase, 3'-Sulfotransferase, and PAPS:flavonol 3-sulfate 3'-sulfotransferase.
