= Quercetin 3-O-sulfate =

- Chemical structure of

Names
- IUPAC name 3′,4′,5,7-Tetrahydroxy-4-oxoflav-2-en-3-yl hydrogen sulfate
- Systematic IUPAC name 2-(3,4-Dihydroxyphenyl)-5,7-dihydroxy-4H-1-benzopyran-3-yl hydrogen sulfate
- Other names Quercetin 3-sulfate

Identifiers
CAS Number	60889-05-6; 121241-74-5 (Potassium salt)
3D model (JSmol)	Interactive image
ChEBI	CHEBI:17730
ChemSpider	4444061
PubChem CID	5280362
UNII	XSS6HSA3AJ
CompTox Dashboard (EPA)	DTXSID10209729
- InChI: InChI=1S/C15H10O10S/c16-7-4-10(19)12-11(5-7)24-14(6-1-2-8(17)9(18)3-6)15(13(12)20)25-26(21,22)23/h1-5,16-19H,(H,21,22,23) Key: DNAYVNOVGHZZLH-UHFFFAOYSA-N; InChI=1/C15H10O10S/c16-7-4-10(19)12-11(5-7)24-14(6-1-2-8(17)9(18)3-6)15(13(12)20)25-26(21,22)23/h1-5,16-19H,(H,21,22,23) Key: DNAYVNOVGHZZLH-UHFFFAOYAR
- SMILES: C1=CC(=C(C=C1C2=C(C(=O)C3=C(C=C(C=C3O2)O)O)OS(=O)(=O)O)O)O

Properties
Chemical formula	C_{15}H_{10}O_{10}S
Molar mass	382.30 g·mol^{−1}
- Except where otherwise noted, data are given for materials in their standard state (at 25 °C [77 °F], 100 kPa). Infobox references

Quercetin 3-sulfate is a plasma human metabolite of quercetin. It is the sulfate conjugate of quercetin.

== Biosynthesis and metabolism ==
Quercetin 3-O-sulfate is produced directly in the perennial herb Flaveria chlorifolia from the flavonol, quercetin, by the enzyme flavonol 3-sulfotransferase. This uses the cofactor 3'-phosphoadenosine-5'-phosphosulfate (PAPS) and gives adenosine 3',5'-bisphosphate as a byproduct.

quercetin
+ PAPS
quercetin 3-O-sulfate
+ adenosine 3',5'-
bisphosphate

Quercetin 3,3',7-trissulfate

In this plant, quercetin-3-sulfate 3'-sulfotransferase converts quercetin 3-O-sulfate to the 3,3' isomer of the bissulfate and quercetin-3-sulfate 4'-sulfotransferase gives the 3,4' isomer. Further reactions lead to compounds including quercetin 3,3',7-trissulfate.
