= Quercetin-3,3'-bissulfate 7-sulfotransferase =

Class of enzymes

Identifiers
- EC no.: 2.8.2.28
- CAS no.: 121855-13-8

Databases
- BRENDA: enzyme data
- ExPASy: NiceZyme view
- KEGG: enzyme entry
- MetaCyc: metabolic pathway
- Rhea: reactions
- PDB structures: RCSB PDB PDBe PDBsum
- Gene Ontology: AmiGO / QuickGO
Search
- PMC: articles
- PubMed: articles
- NCBI: proteins

Quercetin-3,3'-bissulfate 7-sulfotransferase (EC 2.8.2.28) is an enzyme that catalyzes the chemical reaction

quercetin 3,3'-bissulfate
+ PAPS
quercetin 3,3',7-trisulfate
+ adenosine 3',5'-
bisphosphate

It uses the cofactor 3'-phosphoadenosine-5'-phosphosulfate (PAPS) to transfer a sulfate group and gives adenosine 3',5'-bisphosphate as a byproduct. The enzyme characterised from Flaveria chlorifolia converts quercetin 3,3'-bissulfate to quercetin 3,3',7-trisulfate. This is part of a sequence of similar reactions which sequentially add sulfate groups to quercetin.

This enzyme is a transferase, specifically a sulfotransferase, which transfer sulfur-containing groups. The systematic name of this enzyme class is 3'-phosphoadenylyl-sulfate:quercetin-3,3'-bissulfate 7-sulfotransferase. Other names in common use include flavonol 7-sulfotransferase, 7-sulfotransferase, and PAPS:flavonol 3,3'/3,4'-disulfate 7-sulfotransferase.
