= Quercetin glucuronide =

Quercetin glucuronide or Quercetol glucuronide may refer to:

- Quercetin 3-O-glucuronide
- Quercetin 3'-O-glucuronide
