= Quarry Moor =

Site of Special Scientific Interest in North Yorkshire, England

- Site of Special Scientific Interest
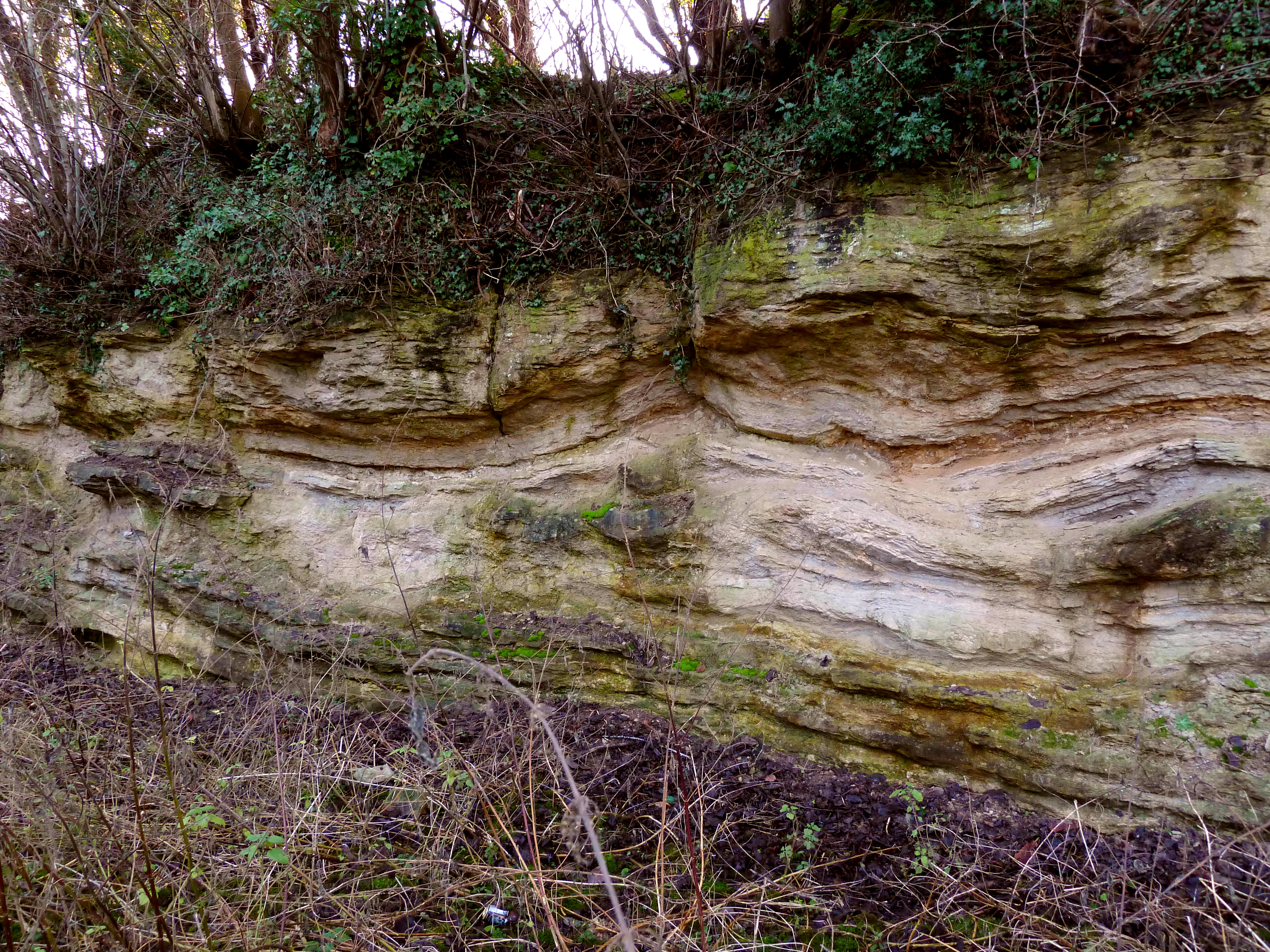
- Former quarry face at Quarry Moor

- Location within North Yorkshire
- Location of Quarry Moor.
- Area of search: North Yorkshire
- Grid reference: SE309693
- Coordinates: 54.1182°N 1.5260°W
- Interest: Biological
- Area: 7.5927 hectares (0.07593 km^{2}; 0.02932 sq mi)
- Notification date: 1 May 1986
- Location map: Defra Magicmap

Quarry Moor is a Site of Special Scientific Interest, or SSSI, at the south edge of Ripon, North Yorkshire, England, and adjacent to the A61 road. It contains an outcrop of Magnesian Limestone, exposed by former quarrying. 255 million years ago this limestone was the peripheral sediment of a tropical sea. The land was donated in 1945 to the people of Ripon by the town's mayor, Alderman Thomas Fowler Spence, a varnish manufacturer. The land was notified as an SSSI in 1986 because its calcareous grassland supported a large diversity of plant species. The site features a Schedule 8 protected plant, thistle broomrape. The land is protected as a nature reserve, and it is also managed as a recreational area. Therefore, its calcareous grass area is fenced off for protection and study, but it also contains a car park, information signs, a children's play area, accessible paths, benches, and dog waste bins.

== Site history ==
The strata of the quarry face at the western side of the Quarry Moor site are the remains of a Permian shoreline of 255 million years past. Sediments from the tropical Zechstein Sea ultimately became the Magnesian Limestone outcrop of north-east England, part of which is exposed here. Limestone has been quarried here for at least six centuries, and used for construction. For example, in the 15th century the walls of the 12th century Chapel of St Mary Magdalen, Ripon, were refaced with blocks of limestone from Quarry Moor. By the 1870s there were lime kilns on the site, making quicklime for mortar.

In September 1943, following the "use of land for army training," botanist George Taylor reported: "Serious disturbance has been observed on Quarry Moor ... where last year Spiranthes spiralis Koch [or lady's tresses orchid] occurred in some quantity and the reappearance of this very local species on this site is problematical." He checked the site again in 1944, and said, "The work of destruction has proceeded apace during the intervening months. The common is now almost completely excavated, and all vestige of plant life - except at the narrow margins - has disappeared." As of 2020, the lady's tresses orchid is "becoming increasingly rare in the north of the UK." The quarry was closed in the 1950s, and the pits were infilled in the 1970s. The infilling was carried out by the British Army, using 190 tonnes of stone supplied by Concrete4U and Lightwater Quarries. In this area there is water-soluble gypsum mixed with the limestone deposits, and the occasional collapse of cavities left by this gypsum layer has been blamed for the local sinkholes which have been appearing for centuries past.

=== Thomas Fowler Spence, donor ===
Quarry Moor is now held in trust for the Ripon people, having been donated in 1945 by Alderman T.F. Spence. The site then measured 24 acres (9.7 ha) "to be kept for Ripon children for all time." Thomas Fowler Spence (1878–1949) lived at Red Hills Grange, was Mayor of Ripon between 1927 and 1929, and was managing director of T.R. Williamsons of Ripon, which made varnish.

== Site location and designation ==
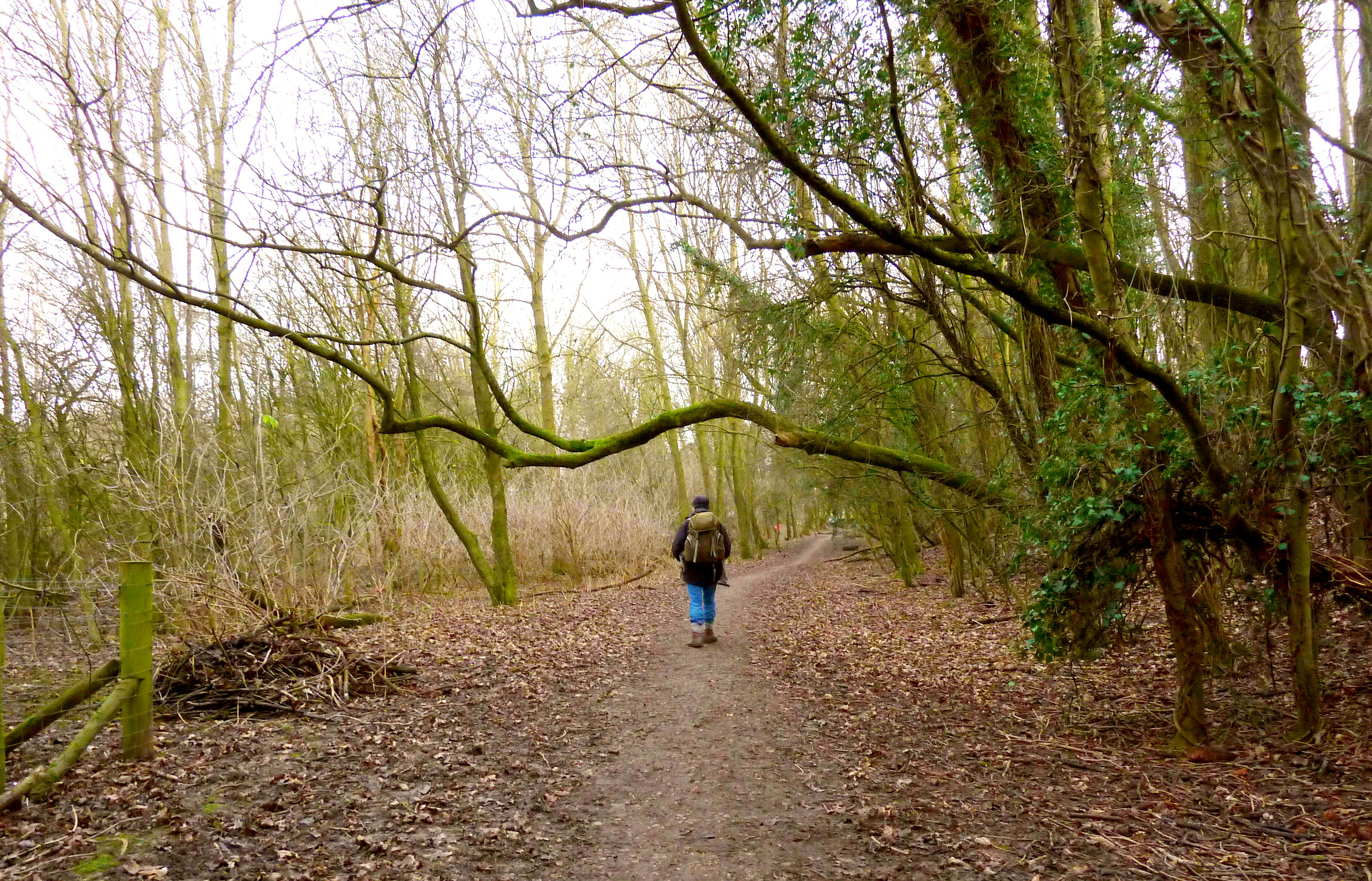
Woodland path, Quarry Moor, 2019

Quarry Moor nature reserve is a 7.5927 hectares (0.07593 km^{2}; 0.02932 sq mi) biological Site of Special Scientific Interest (SSSI) and Geological Conservation Review site (GCR), consisting of "species-rich calcareous grassland" over a scant soil covering, plus limestone rock, scrub, and woodland on raised areas and on the perimeter of the site. It lies at the southern edge of Ripon, with an entrance on the west side of the A61 roundabout. Facilities include information boards, accessible paths, informal paths, benches, and dog toilet bins, besides a fenced-off wildflower meadow, and a children's play area in the north-east corner with a public car park.

The site was notified on 1 May 1986, being of interest for the large number of plant species supported by the calcareous grassland habitat. The notified features of the site are the Schedule 8 protected plant, thistle broomrape, and the chalky grassland. The site was designated in 2001 as a Local Nature Reserve. It is one of a number of SSSIs in the Harrogate region. The others are Bishop Monkton Ings, Brimham Rocks, Cow Myers, Farnham Mires, Hack Fall Wood, Hay-a-Park, Kirk Deighton Mar Field Fen, and Ripon Parks.

Quarry Moor is funded by Natural England, via Defra Aggregates Levy Sustainability Fund, Harrogate Borough Council, Ripon City Partnership and (until 2012) Yorkshire Forward. As of 2019 it was cared for by the Alderman T.F. Spence Committee, which consists of six Ripon City councillors, and six members of the public.

== Significant site content ==
=== Flora ===
On the chalky grassland, alongside sheep's fescue and meadow oat-grass, grow rough hawkbit, hoary plantain, purging flax, thyme, glaucous sedge, yellow oat, quaking grass and red fescue. Among these are red bartsia, centaury, yellow-wort, bee orchid and felwort or autumn gentian.

On other grassland here, the pH is more neutral, and the vegetation can grow more strongly. For example, there are various herbs: common spotted-orchid, great burnet, restharrow, marjoram, cowslip, hay rattle, greater burnet-saxifrage, basil, cross-wort, ox-eye daisy, knapweed, self-heal, lady's bedstraw, bird's-foot trefoil and primrose, all growing alongside slender false-broom and false-oat grass.

Under the sycamore, wych elm, yew and ash in the wooded areas, goldilocks and sanicle can sometimes be found. More common there, are: dog's mercury, hairy St John's-wort, slender false-broom again, and wood avens.

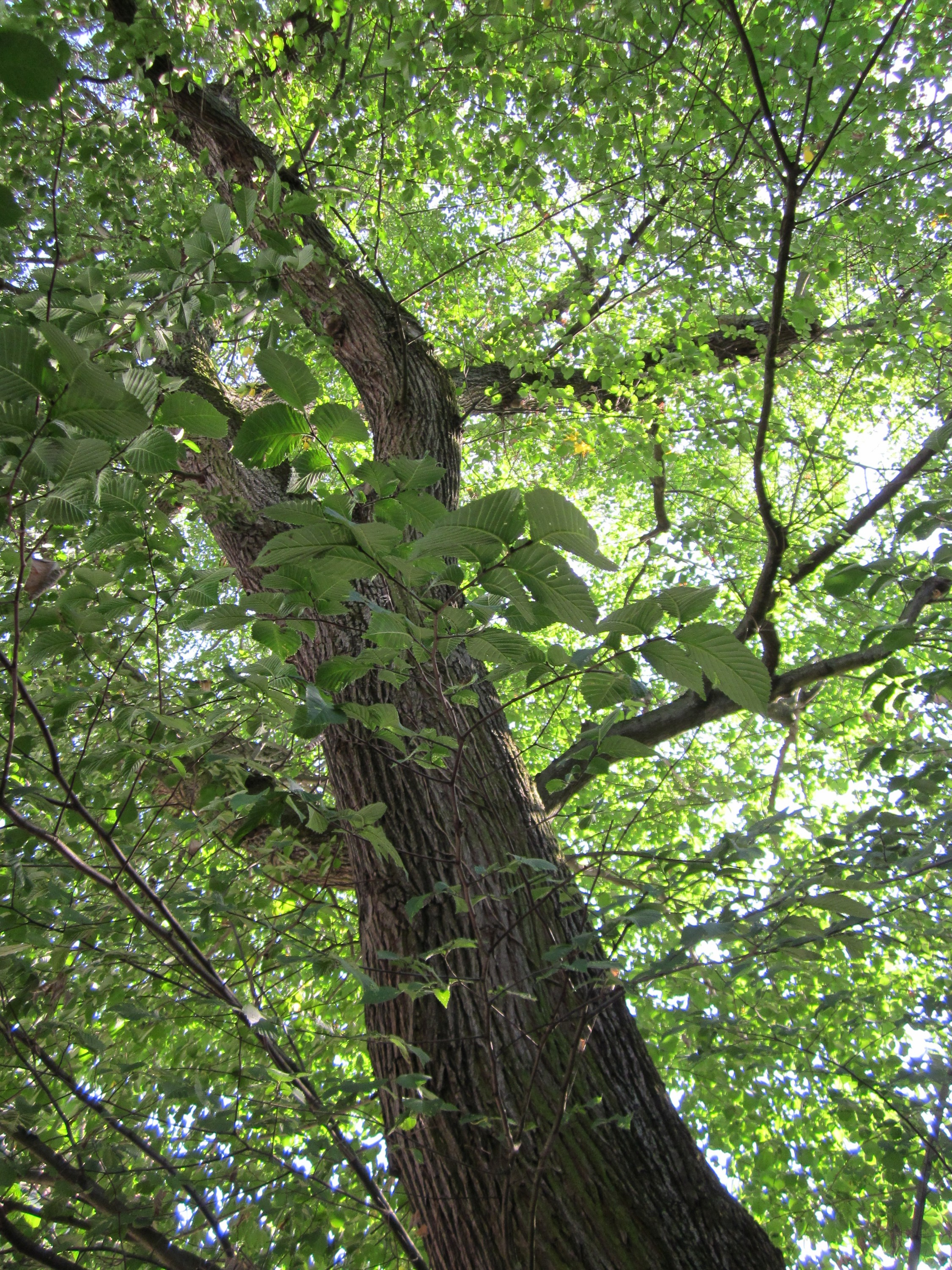
wych elm

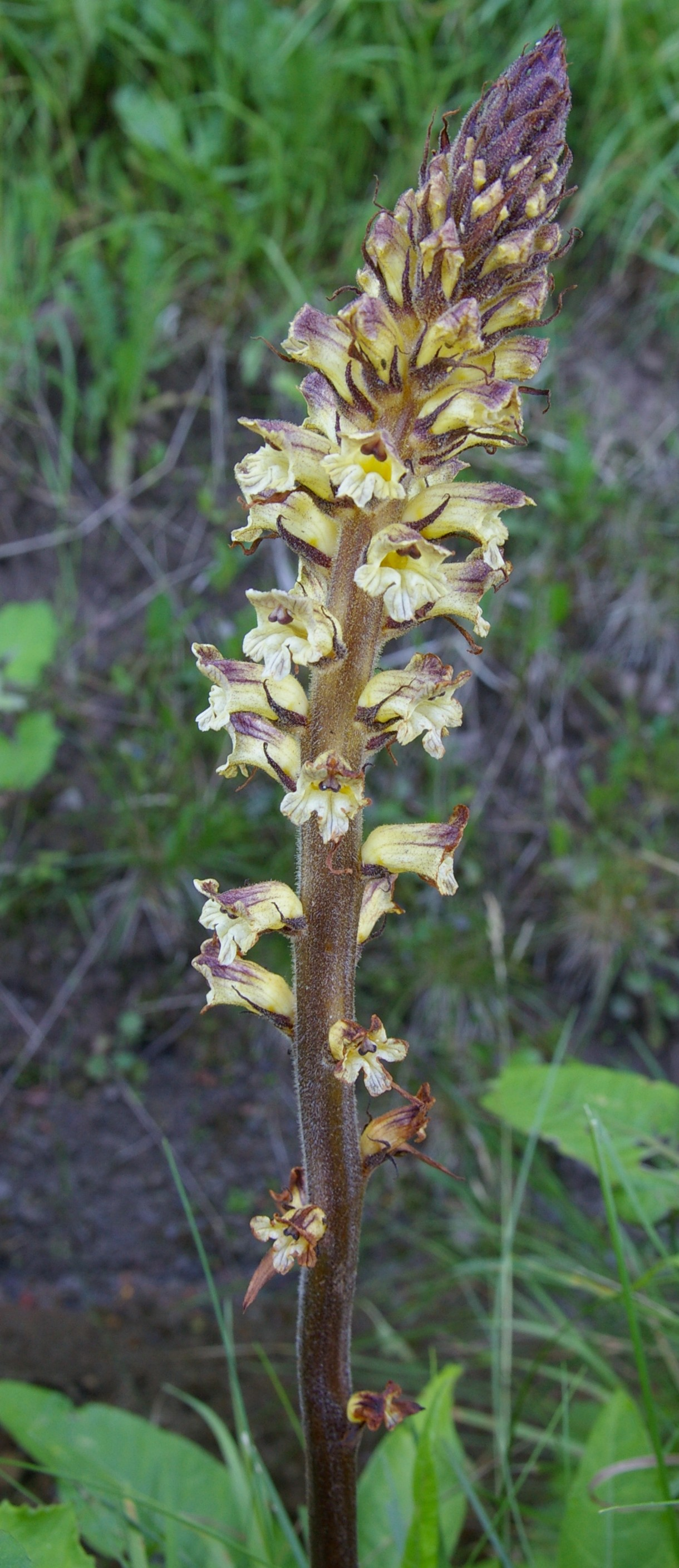
Thistle broomrape (protected plant)

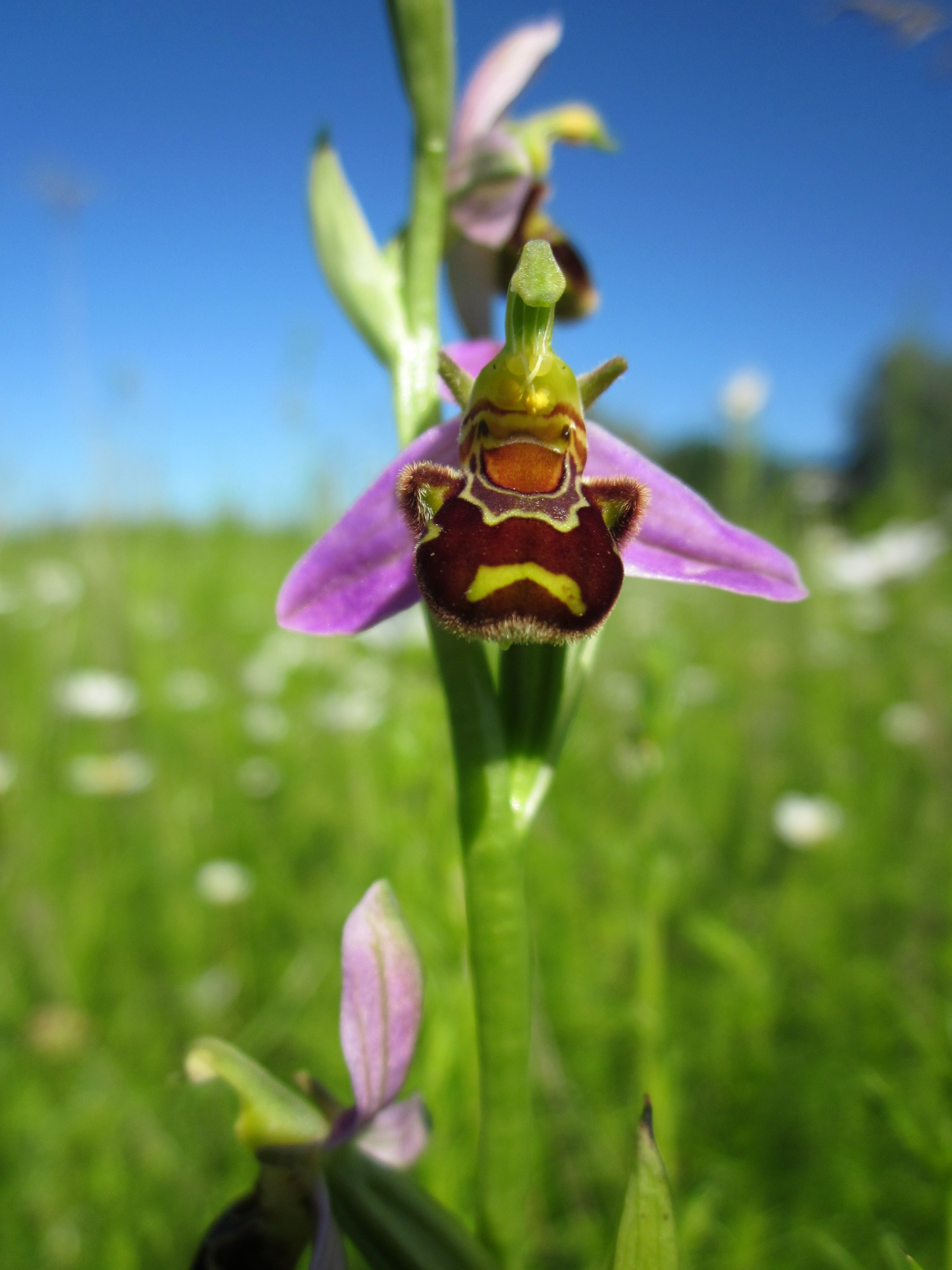
bee orchid

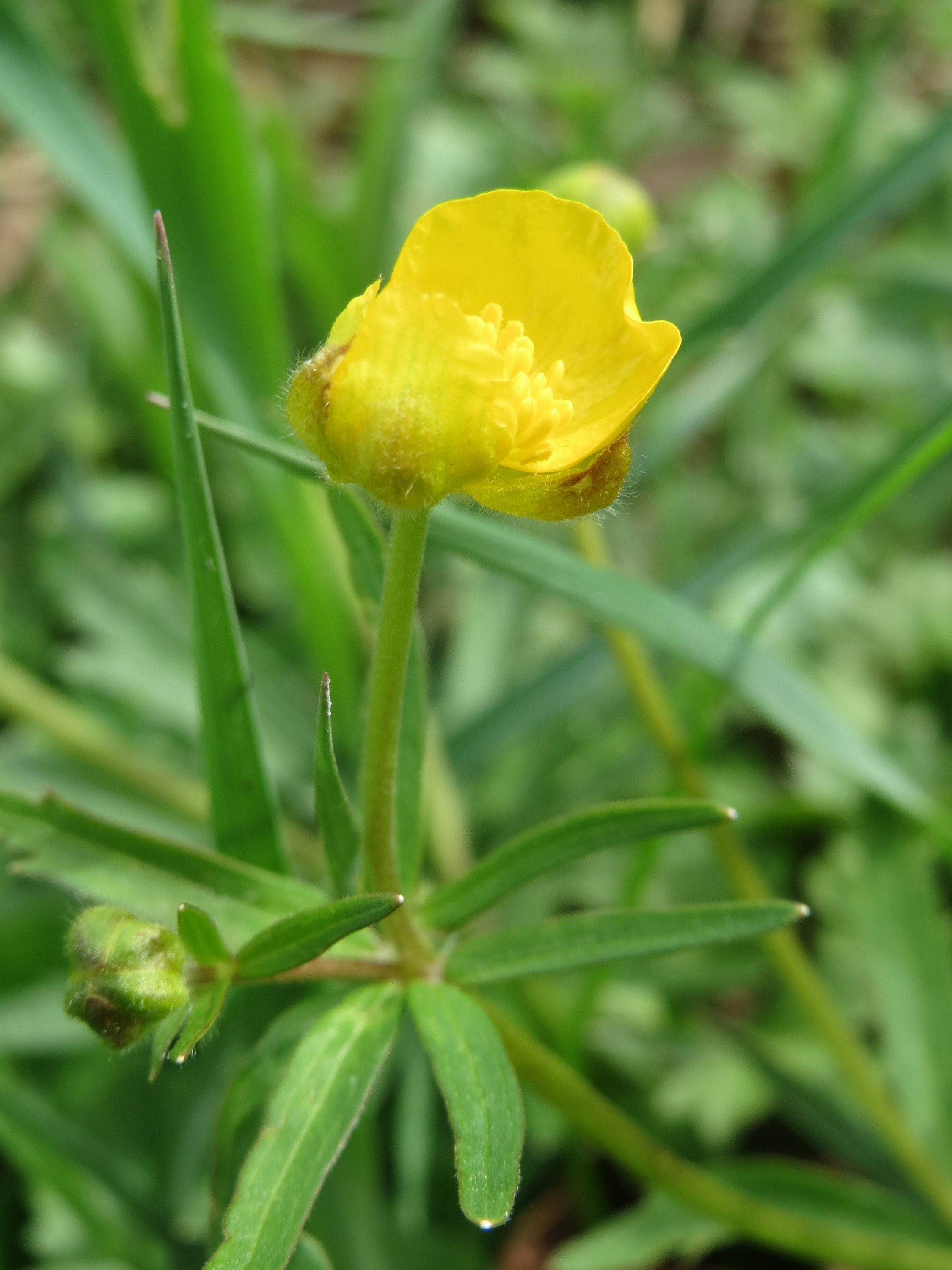
goldilocks

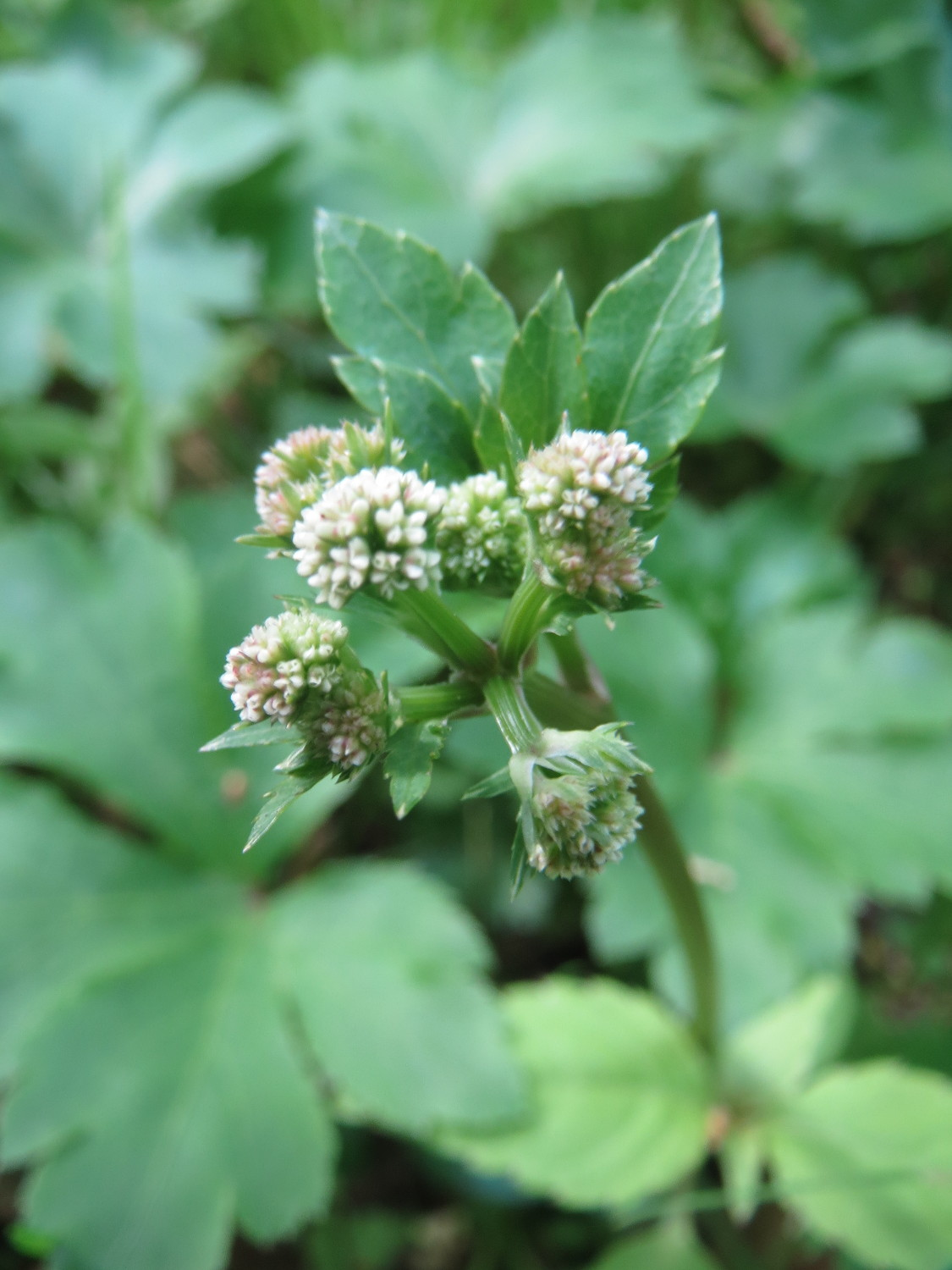
sanicle

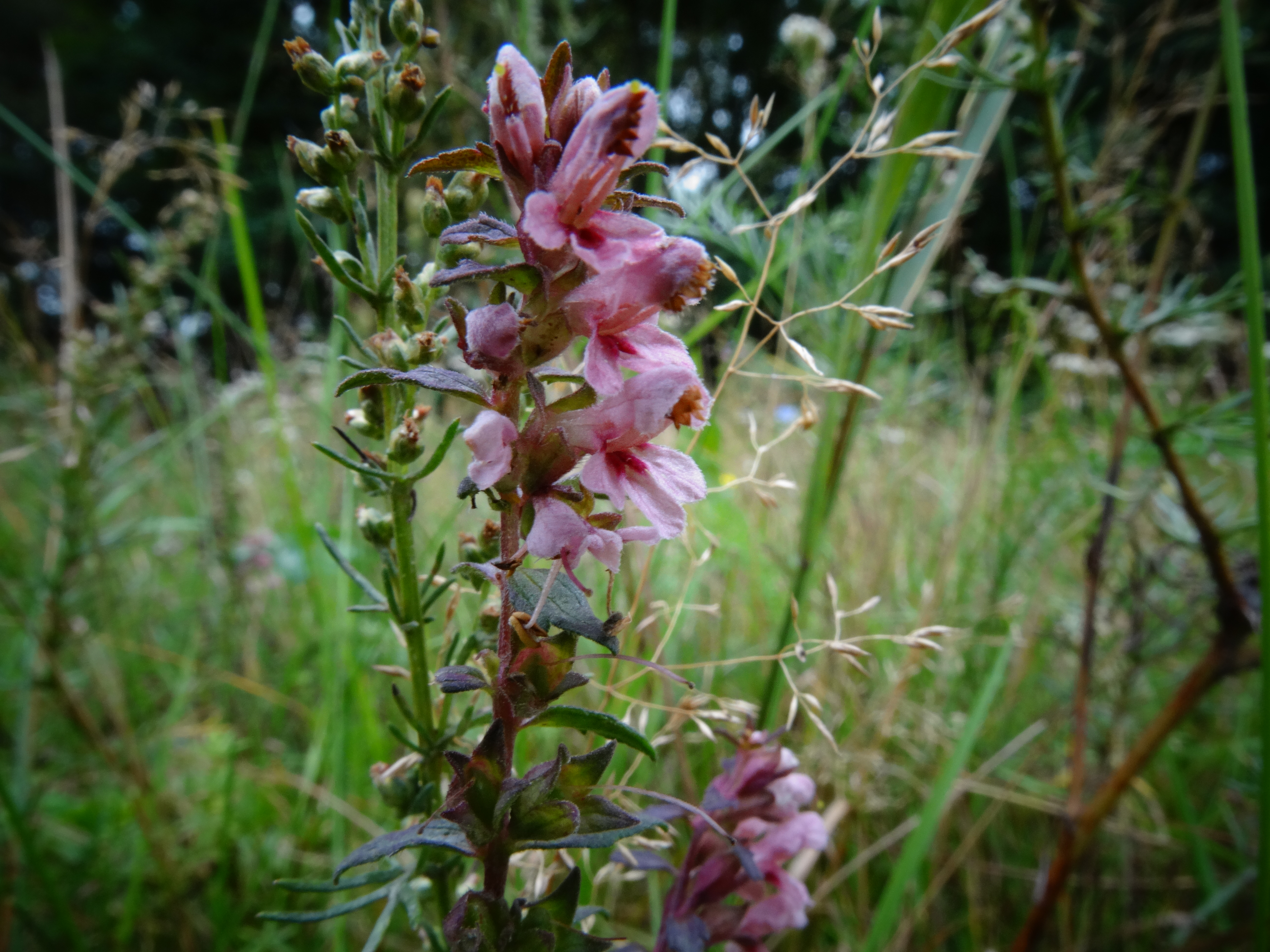
red bartsia

=== Fauna ===
Quarry Moor's scrub provides a breeding site for whitethroat and willow warbler, summer visitors from Africa. The site also supports the resident treecreeper, wren and blackcap population. There is a bird feeding station and a bird hide in the south-east corner of the site. Insects breeding onsite include the brimstone butterfly, and the six-spot burnet moth, whose food plant is bird's-foot trefoil. Mammal sightings at Quarry Moor have included deer, vole, weasel and fox.

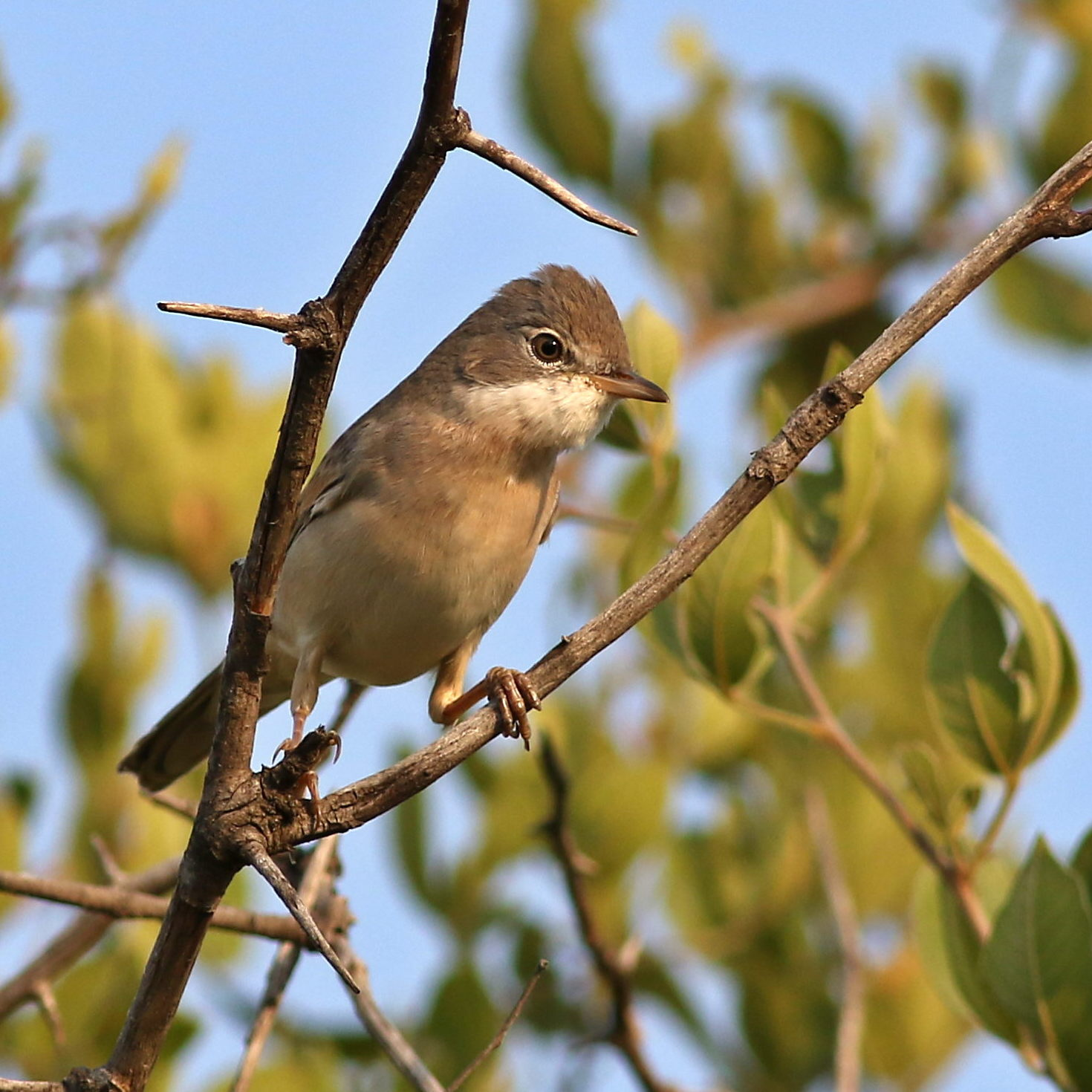
whitethroat

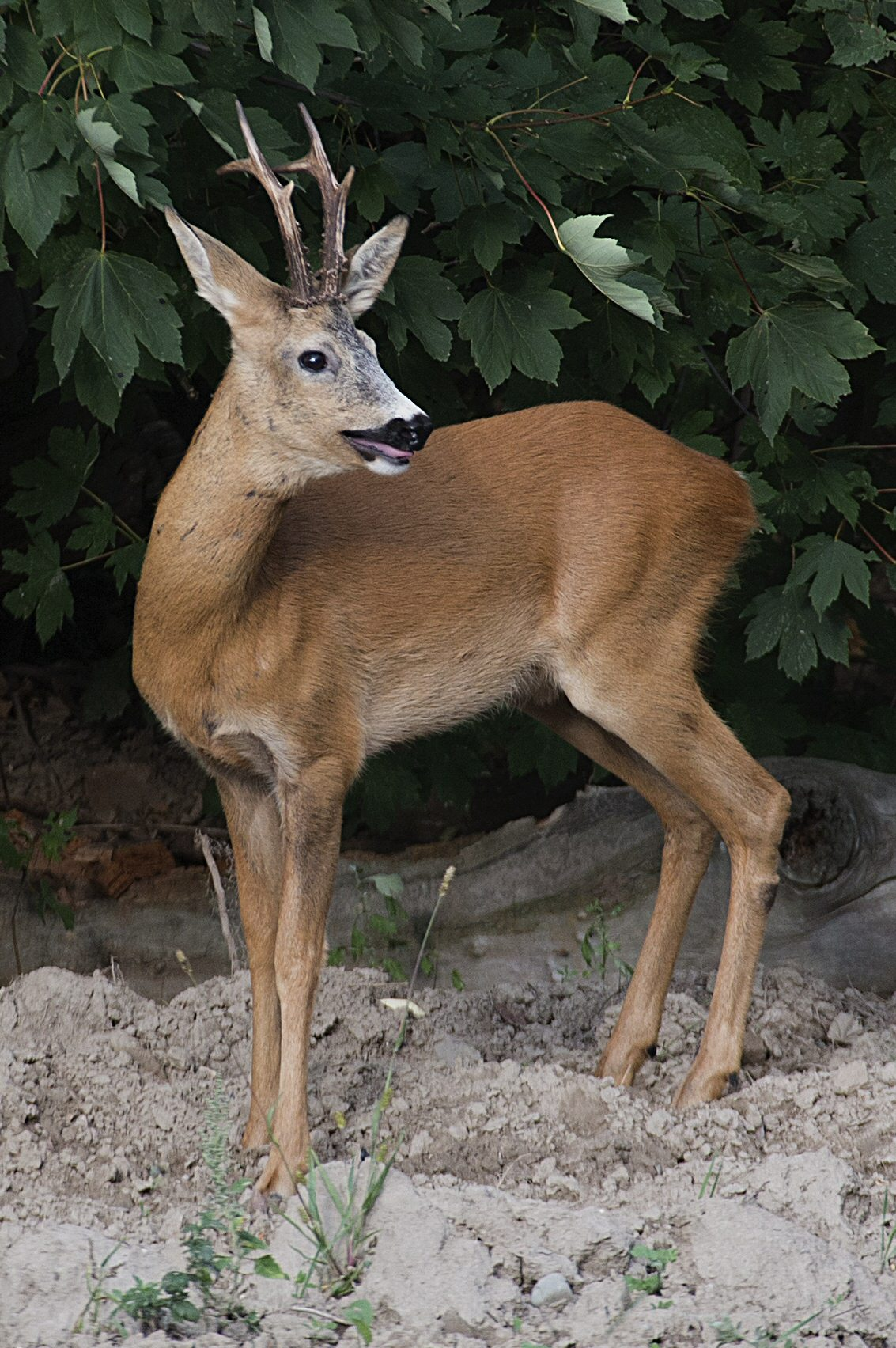
roe deer

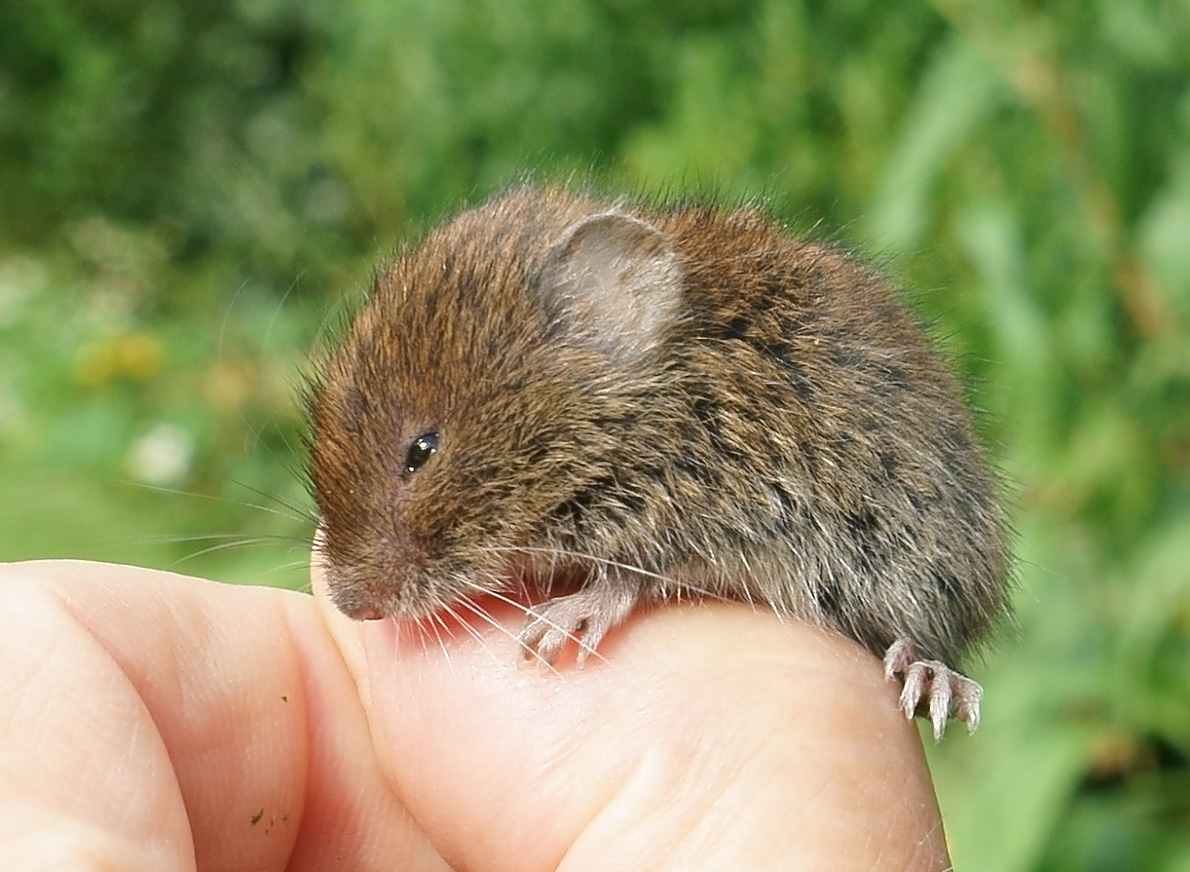
field vole

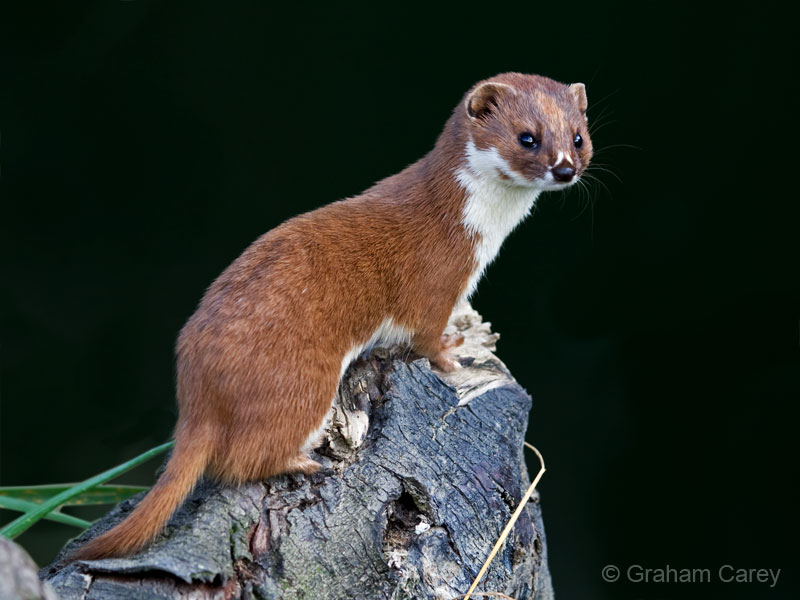
weasel

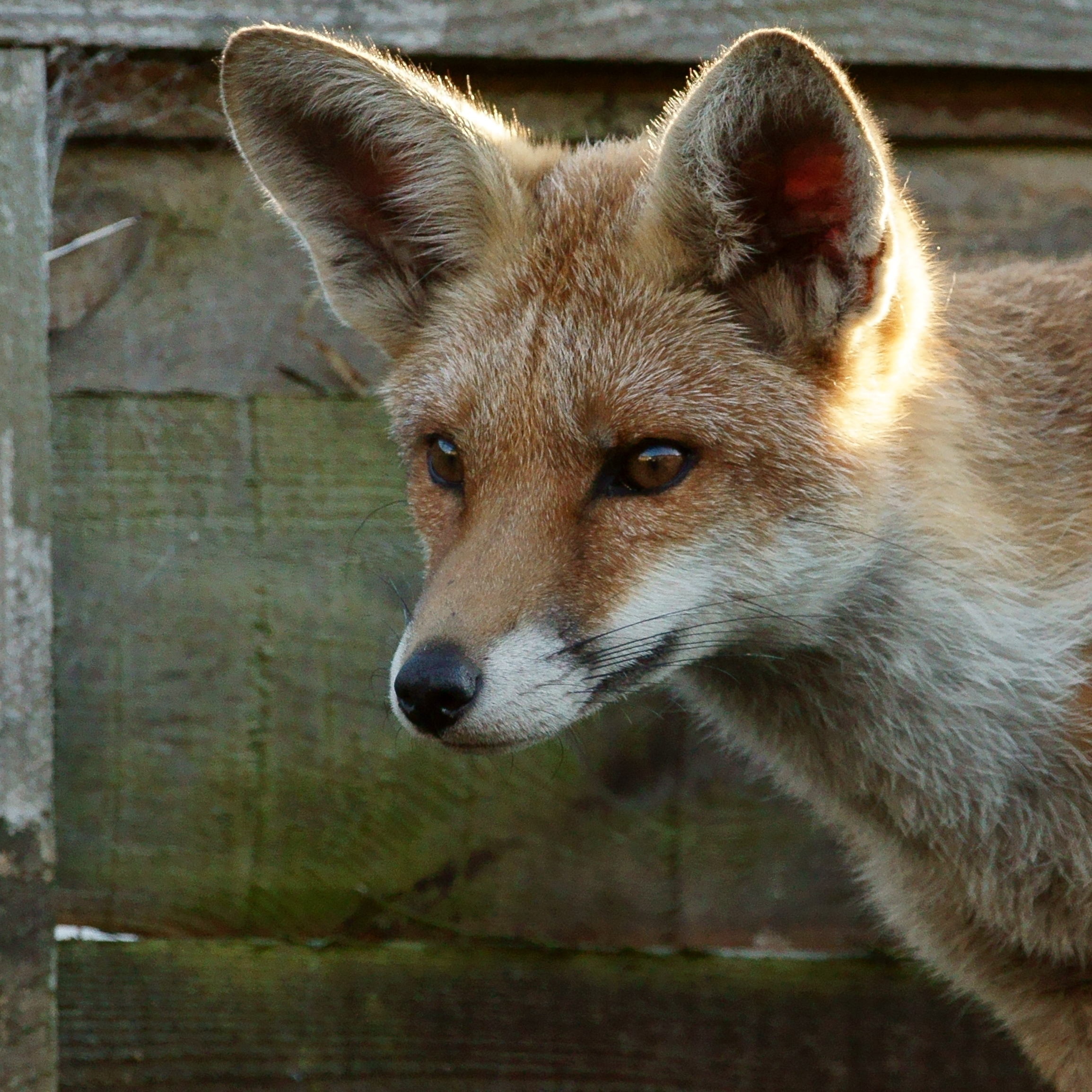
fox

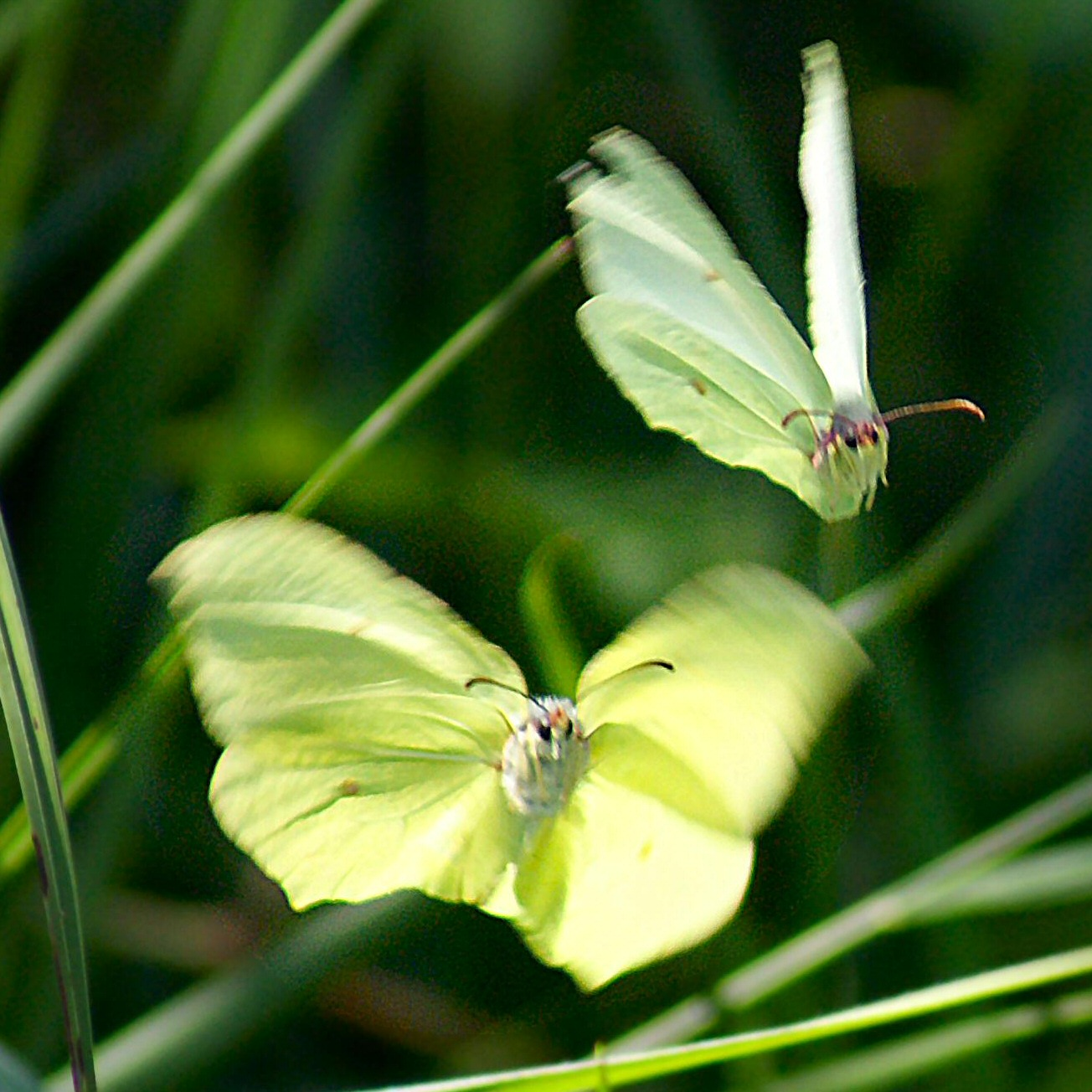
brimstone butterfly

== Maintenance ==
The major aspect of the site for the SSSI is the limestone grassland, because it can support "a rich variety of plants and animals, including a number of rare plant species." Maintenance of this section is needed to prevent the growth of rank grass and scrub, which would eventually dominate the area and affect the site's biodiversity. Light winter grazing is recommended, to prevent the dominance of scrub, and to achieve a "diverse mosaic of tall and short vegetation" in order to support biodiversity. Thus traditional hay cutting is carried out, and the grassland is grazed by ponies, cattle and native sheep such as Hebrideans. Fertiliser is not recommended because limestone grasslands support species which are adapted to low-nutrient habitats.

== Development and risk assessment ==
When the calcareous grassland of this site was assessed for Natural England in 2011 it was judged to be in favourable condition, although the biodiversity was borderline, and scrub (hawthorn and ivy) was beginning to encroach on the grassland. The woodland area was judged favourable.

English Nature has published a list of "operations likely to damage the special interest." Item 27, Recreational or other activities likely to damage or disturb features of interest, may be pertinent since the park is also maintained for public recreational use. Natural England prohibits the picking of wild flowers, and the dropping of litter. Dogs are required to be kept on the lead, and dog litter bins are provided. Meanwhile, in point 9.2 of a letter granting a 2018 planning application for houses near the SSSI, a site assessor noted that dogs were being exercised on the protected calcareous grassland, dog waste was being left in situ, and "litter, vandalism and degradation are also frequent."
