= Guaijaverin =

Names
- IUPAC name 3-(α-L-Arabinopyranosyloxy)-3′,4′,5,7-tetrahydroxyflavone
- Systematic IUPAC name 2-(3,4-Dihydroxyphenyl)-5,7-dihydroxy-3-{[(2S,3R,4S,5S)-3,4,5-trihydroxyoxan-2-yl]oxy}-4H-1-benzopyran-4-one
- Other names Guajavarin; Guaijaverin; Guajaverin; CHEMBL464507; Quercetin 3-arabinoside

Identifiers
| CAS Number | 22255-13-6 |
| 3D model (JSmol) | Interactive image |
| ChEMBL | ChEMBL464507 |
| ChemSpider | 4587174 |
| EC Number | 250-156-0 |
| PubChem CID | 5481224 |
| CompTox Dashboard (EPA) | DTXSID60176795 |
- InChI: InChI=1S/C20H18O11/c21-8-4-11(24)14-13(5-8)30-18(7-1-2-9(22)10(23)3-7)19(16(14)27)31-20-17(28)15(26)12(25)6-29-20/h1-5,12,15,17,20-26,28H,6H2/t12-,15-,17+,20-/m0/s1 Key: PZZRDJXEMZMZFD-IEGSVRCHSA-N
- SMILES: C1[C@@H]([C@@H]([C@H]([C@@H](O1)OC2=C(OC3=CC(=CC(=C3C2=O)O)O)C4=CC(=C(C=C4)O)O)O)O)O

Properties
| Chemical formula | C_{20}H_{18}O_{11} |
| Molar mass | 434.353 g·mol^{−1} |
- Except where otherwise noted, data are given for materials in their standard state (at 25 °C [77 °F], 100 kPa). Infobox references

Guaijaverin is the 3-O-arabinoside of quercetin. It is found in the leaves of Psidium guajava, the common guava.
