= CTN-986 =

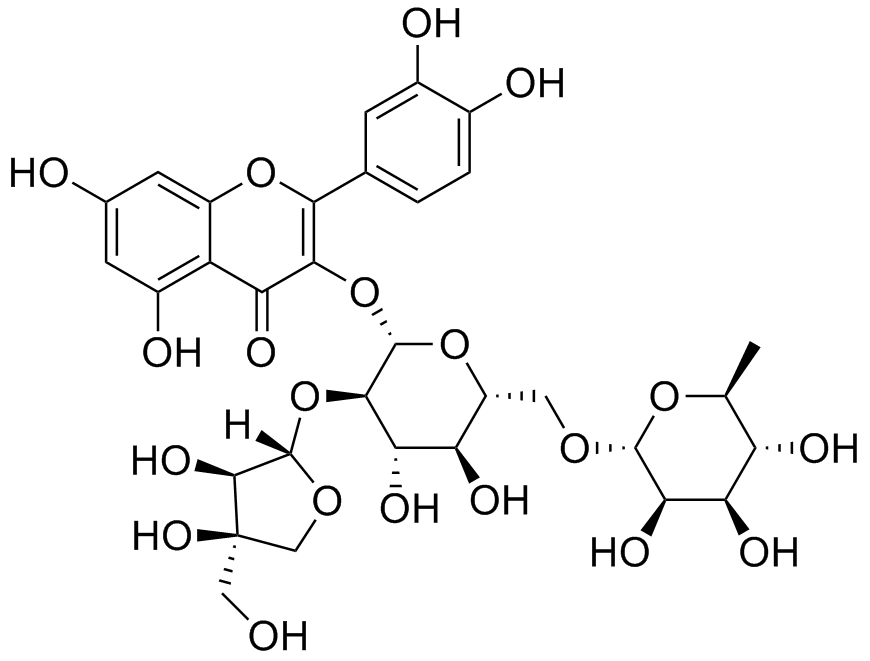

Names
- IUPAC name 3′,4′,5,7-Tetrahydroxy-3-{[3-C-(hydroxymethyl)-β-D-erythrofuranosyl]-(1→2)-[α-L-rhamnopyranosyl-(1→6)]-β-D-glucopyranosyloxy}flavone
- Systematic IUPAC name (4^{2}S,4^{3}R,4^{4}S,4^{5}S,4^{6}R,7^{2}R,7^{3}R,7^{4}R,7^{5}R,7^{6}S)-4^{3}-{[(2S,3R,4R)-3,4-Dihydroxy-4-(hydroxymethyl)oxolan-2-yl]oxy}-1^{3},1^{4},2^{5},2^{7},4^{4},4^{5},7^{3},7^{4},7^{5}-nonahydroxy-7^{6}-methyl-2^{4}H-3,6-dioxa-2(2,3)-[1]benzofurana-4(2,6),7(2)-bis(oxana)-1(1)-benzenaheptaphane-2^{4}-one
- Other names 3-[(O-D-apio-β-D-furanosyl-(1→2)-O-[6-deoxy-α-L-mannopyranosyl-(1→6)]-β-D-glucopyranosyl)oxy]-2-(3,4-dihydroxyphenyl)-5,7-dihydroxy-4H-1-benzopyran-4-one; Quercetin 3-O-b-d-apiofuranosyl-(1→2)-[a-l-rhamnopyranosyl-(1→6)]-b-d-glucopyranoside

Identifiers
CAS Number	63947-67-1
3D model (JSmol)	Interactive image
ChemSpider	24844836
PubChem CID	44259159
UNII	WL62JB5J9G
CompTox Dashboard (EPA)	DTXSID20658067
- InChI: InChI=1S/C32H38O20/c1-10-19(38)22(41)24(43)29(48-10)46-7-17-20(39)23(42)27(52-31-28(44)32(45,8-33)9-47-31)30(50-17)51-26-21(40)18-15(37)5-12(34)6-16(18)49-25(26)11-2-3-13(35)14(36)4-11/h2-6,10,17,19-20,22-24,27-31,33-39,41-45H,7-9H2,1H3/t10-,17+,19-,20+,22+,23-,24+,27+,28-,29+,30-,31-,32+/m0/s1 Key: UPVDFUGORYNXMW-VCKCKQTPSA-N; InChI=1/C32H38O20/c1-10-19(38)22(41)24(43)29(48-10)46-7-17-20(39)23(42)27(52-31-28(44)32(45,8-33)9-47-31)30(50-17)51-26-21(40)18-15(37)5-12(34)6-16(18)49-25(26)11-2-3-13(35)14(36)4-11/h2-6,10,17,19-20,22-24,27-31,33-39,41-45H,7-9H2,1H3/t10-,17+,19-,20+,22+,23-,24+,27+,28-,29+,30-,31-,32+/m0/s1 Key: UPVDFUGORYNXMW-VCKCKQTPBC
- SMILES: OC1=CC(O)=C(C(C(O[C@H]2[C@H](O[C@@]3([H])[C@H](O)[C@@](O)(CO)CO3)[C@@H](O)[C@H](O)[C@@H](CO[C@H]4[C@H](O)[C@H](O)[C@@H](O)[C@H](C)O4)O2)=C(C5=CC=C(O)C(O)=C5)O6)=O)C6=C1

Properties
Chemical formula	C_{32}H_{38}O_{20}
Molar mass	742.636 g·mol^{−1}
- Except where otherwise noted, data are given for materials in their standard state (at 25 °C [77 °F], 100 kPa). verify (what is ?) Infobox references

CTN-986 is a glycoside of quercetin found in cottonseeds and cottonseed oil. In a rodent model, it displays some antidepressant-like properties and stimulation of neurogenesis in the hippocampus. The neurogenesis appears to be mediated by activation of the 5-HT_{1A} receptor, as co-administration with the 5-HT_{1A} antagonist WAY-100,635 abolished the effect.

== See also ==
- NSI-189
