= Spiraeoside =

- Spiraeoside structure

Names
- IUPAC name 4′-(β-D-Glucopyranosyloxy)-3,3′,5,7-tetrahydroxyflavone
- Systematic IUPAC name 3,5,7-Trihydroxy-2-(3-hydroxy-4-{[(2S,3R,4S,5S,6R)-3,4,5-trihydroxy-6-(hydroxymethyl)oxan-2-yl]oxy}phenyl)-4H-1-benzopyran-4-one
- Other names Spiraeosid; Spiraein; Quercetin-4'-glucoside; Quercetin 4'-O-glucoside; Quercetin-4-O-β-D-glucoside

Identifiers
CAS Number	20229-56-5
3D model (JSmol)	Interactive image
Beilstein Reference	68011
ChEBI	CHEBI:75839
ChEMBL	ChEMBL402947
ChemSpider	4478811
ECHA InfoCard	100.039.634
EC Number	243-614-6
PubChem CID	5320844
UNII	K2B74751XI
CompTox Dashboard (EPA)	DTXSID00174078
- InChI: InChI=1S/C21H20O12/c22-6-13-15(26)17(28)19(30)21(33-13)32-11-2-1-7(3-9(11)24)20-18(29)16(27)14-10(25)4-8(23)5-12(14)31-20/h1-5,13,15,17,19,21-26,28-30H,6H2/t13-,15-,17+,19-,21-/m1/s1 Key: OIUBYZLTFSLSBY-HMGRVEAOSA-N; InChI=1/C21H20O12/c22-6-13-15(26)17(28)19(30)21(33-13)32-11-2-1-7(3-9(11)24)20-18(29)16(27)14-10(25)4-8(23)5-12(14)31-20/h1-5,13,15,17,19,21-26,28-30H,6H2/t13-,15-,17+,19-,21-/m1/s1 Key: OIUBYZLTFSLSBY-HMGRVEAOBO
- SMILES: c1cc(c(cc1c2c(c(=O)c3c(cc(cc3o2)O)O)O)O)O[C@H]4[C@@H]([C@H]([C@@H]([C@H](O4)CO)O)O)O

Properties
Chemical formula	C_{21}H_{20}O_{12}
Molar mass	464.379 g·mol^{−1}
- Except where otherwise noted, data are given for materials in their standard state (at 25 °C [77 °F], 100 kPa). verify (what is ?) Infobox references

Spiraeoside is a chemical compound. It can be isolated from flowers of meadowsweet (Filipendula ulmaria) or from garden onion (Allium cepa).

Spiraeoside is the 4'-O-glucoside of quercetin.
