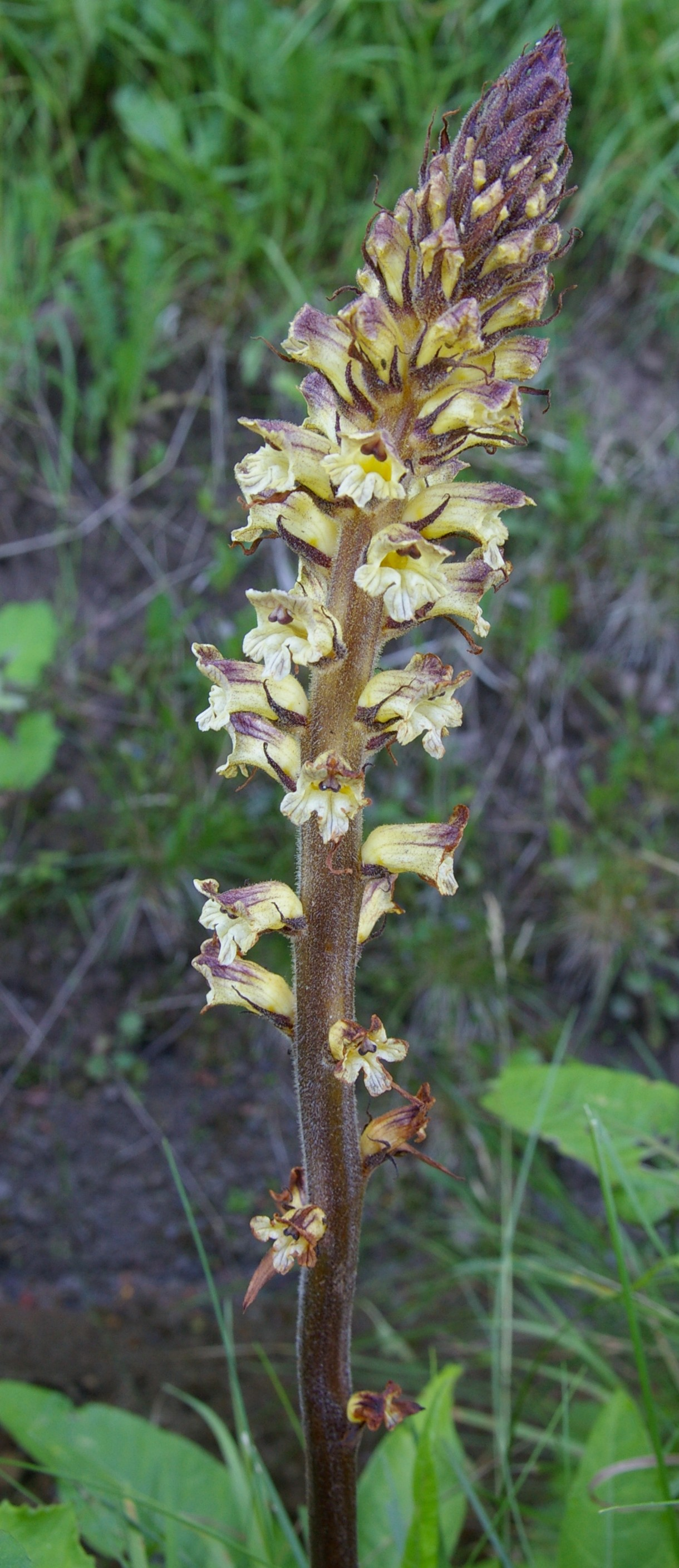

Scientific classification
- Kingdom: Plantae
- Clade: Embryophytes
- Clade: Tracheophytes
- Clade: Angiosperms
- Clade: Eudicots
- Clade: Asterids
- Order: Lamiales
- Family: Orobanchaceae
- Genus: Orobanche
- Species: O. reticulata

Binomial name
- Orobanche reticulata Wallr. 1825

Synonyms
- Orobanche pallidiflora Wimm. & Grab.

= Orobanche reticulata =

Species of flowering plant

Orobanche reticulata is a species of broomrape known by the common name thistle broomrape. It is a parasitic plant whose host is normally the creeping thistle. It is native to the lowlands of Western Europe and Central Asia, but in the United Kingdom it is a rare and protected plant, growing only in Yorkshire, on grassland sites such as Quarry Moor.

== Description ==
Orobanche reticulata was described by taxonomist Karl Friedrich Wilhelm Wallroth (Wallr.) in 1825. Its usual host plant is creeping thistle. It is a herbaceous and self-supporting plant with simple broad, scale-like leaves, normally growing up to 70 centimetres (28 in), and it flowers between May and July. It is a tuberous perennial, a hermaphrodite plant which possibly germinates in the spring. It has a yellow-purple stem. The two-lipped flowers, measuring 15–25 mm (0.6–1 inch), have dark spots and purple stigmas. However, for full identification, the host must be noted.

== Distribution and range ==
In general it is a lowland plant which grows on the edges of rivers and roads, and on floodplains, preferring grassland. In the United Kingdom it prefers dry, calcareous soil without shade, and an altitude of 100–150 metres (328–492 feet). It is possibly water-dispersed in some cases. It is a plant of temperate climates, native to the lowlands of Western Europe and Central Asia. In Belgium and northern France its range is 10–30%; in Germany, Denmark and the Netherlands 30–60%.

=== Orobanche reticulata in the United Kingdom ===
Orobanche reticulata is native and stable in the UK, where it is also known as Yorkshire broomrape. It is however a rare plant there, having been notified as a protected plant under Schedule 8. It grows only in Yorkshire, where it appears mainly in the Magnesian Limestone zone, but also at Wharram Quarry.

At Wharram it has a "good population" of up to 224 flower spikes (2017), parasitising woolly thistle, and can grow quite tall there (up to 81 centimetres (32 in)) although it may have been introduced artificially. At Hetchell Wood 117 flower spikes were recorded in 2015, and at Ripon Loop 77 spikes were recorded in 2014. In 2004 it was found at North Grimston. It was notified in 1989 on Hook Moor SSSI, where Natural England suggests that rabbit activity is beneficial to the survival of this plant. It grows at Quarry Moor, which was notified as a Site of Special Scientific Interest (SSSI) in 1986, partly because it featured O. reticulata. It is also found on some road verges in Yorkshire.

== Research ==
In 1998 the Broomrape Conservation Workshop was actively monitoring O. reticulata across Yorkshire.
