= Sulfate conjugate =

Sulfate conjugates are a heterogeneous class of polar, anionic organosulfate compounds containing an ester of sulfuric acid. Sulfate conjugates commonly result from the metabolic conjugation of endogenous and exogenous compounds with sulfate (-OSO_{3}^{−}).

Biosynthesis of sulfate esters requires an activated sulfate donor, usually adenosine 5'-phosphosulfate (APS) or 3'-phosphoadenosine-5'-phosphosulfate (PAPS). Sulfate esters may be hydrolyzed by sulfatase enzyme to release the parent alcohol and a sulfate ion.

Steroid sulfation is one of the most common of all forms of steroid conjugation. Except for cholesterol, dehydroepiandrosterone sulfate is the most abundant of all plasma steroids. Estrone sulfate is the most abundant of all the estrogens in the human body. Estrone sulfate is synthesized by the enzyme estrone sulfotransferase.

== Example ==
Quercetin 3-O-sulfate
