= Miquelianin =

- Chemical structure of miquelianin

Names
- IUPAC name 3′,4′,5,7-Tetrahydroxy-4-oxoflav-2-en-3-yl β-D-glucopyranosiduronic acid
- Systematic IUPAC name (2S,3S,4S,5R,6S)-6-{[2-(3,4-Dihydroxyphenyl)-5,7-dihydroxy-4-oxo-4H-1-benzopyran-3-yl]oxy}-3,4,5-trihydroxyoxane-2-carboxylic acid
- Other names Quercetin 3-O-glucuronide; Quercetol glucuronide Quercetin 3-glucuronide Quercetol 3-O-glucuronide quercetin 3-O-β-D-glucuronopyranoside; Querciturone

Identifiers
CAS Number	22688-79-5
3D model (JSmol)	Interactive image
ChEBI	CHEBI:66395
ChEMBL	ChEMBL520546
ChemSpider	4438874
PubChem CID	5274585
UNII	RY36PD0CQ2
CompTox Dashboard (EPA)	DTXSID70945358
- InChI: InChI=1S/C21H18O13/c22-7-4-10(25)12-11(5-7)32-17(6-1-2-8(23)9(24)3-6)18(13(12)26)33-21-16(29)14(27)15(28)19(34-21)20(30)31/h1-5,14-16,19,21-25,27-29H,(H,30,31)/t14-,15-,16+,19-,21+/m0/s1 Key: DUBCCGAQYVUYEU-ZUGPOPFOSA-N
- SMILES: C1=CC(=C(C=C1C2=C(C(=O)C3=C(C=C(C=C3O2)O)O)OC4C(C(C(C(O4)C(=O)O)O)O)O)O)O

Properties
Chemical formula	C_{21}H_{18}O_{13}
Molar mass	478.362 g·mol^{−1}
Density	1.961 g/mL
- Except where otherwise noted, data are given for materials in their standard state (at 25 °C [77 °F], 100 kPa). Infobox references

Miquelianin (quercetin 3-O-glucuronide) is a flavonol glucuronide, a type of phenolic compound present in wine, in species of St John's wort, like Hypericum hirsutum, in Nelumbo nucifera (Indian lotus) or in green beans.

It is also a rat plasma quercetin metabolite. It shows an antioxidant effect in human plasma. In vitro studies indicate that miquelianin is able to reach the central nervous system from the small intestine.

== Formation ==
The enzyme glucuronosyltransferase converts quercetin to its glucuronide by adding a sugar acid at one of the hydroxy groups, with uridine diphosphate (UDP) as byproduct:

quercetin
+ UDP-glucuronate
UDP
miquelianin

== See also ==
- Phenolic content in wine
