= Flavonol 3-sulfotransferase =

Class of enzymes

Identifiers
- EC no.: 2.8.2.25
- CAS no.: 121855-10-5

Databases
- BRENDA: enzyme data
- ExPASy: NiceZyme view
- KEGG: enzyme entry
- MetaCyc: metabolic pathway
- Rhea: reactions
- PDB structures: RCSB PDB PDBe PDBsum
- Gene Ontology: AmiGO / QuickGO
Search
- PMC: articles
- PubMed: articles
- NCBI: proteins

A flavonol 3-sulfotransferase (EC 2.8.2.25) is an enzyme that catalyzes the general chemical reaction

a flavanonol +
PAPS
flavanonol 3-O-sulfate +
adenosine 3',5'-bisphosphate

It uses the cofactor 3'-phosphoadenosine-5'-phosphosulfate (PAPS) and gives adenosine 3',5'-bisphosphate as a byproduct. For example, the enzyme characterised from Flaveria chlorifolia converts quercetin to quercetin 3-O-sulfate :

quercetin
+ PAPS
quercetin 3-O-sulfate
+ adenosine 3',5'-
bisphosphate

This enzyme is a transferase of sulfotransferase type, which transfer sulfate groups. The systematic name of this enzyme class is 3'-phosphoadenylyl-sulfate:flavonol 3-sulfotransferase.
