= Quercetin =

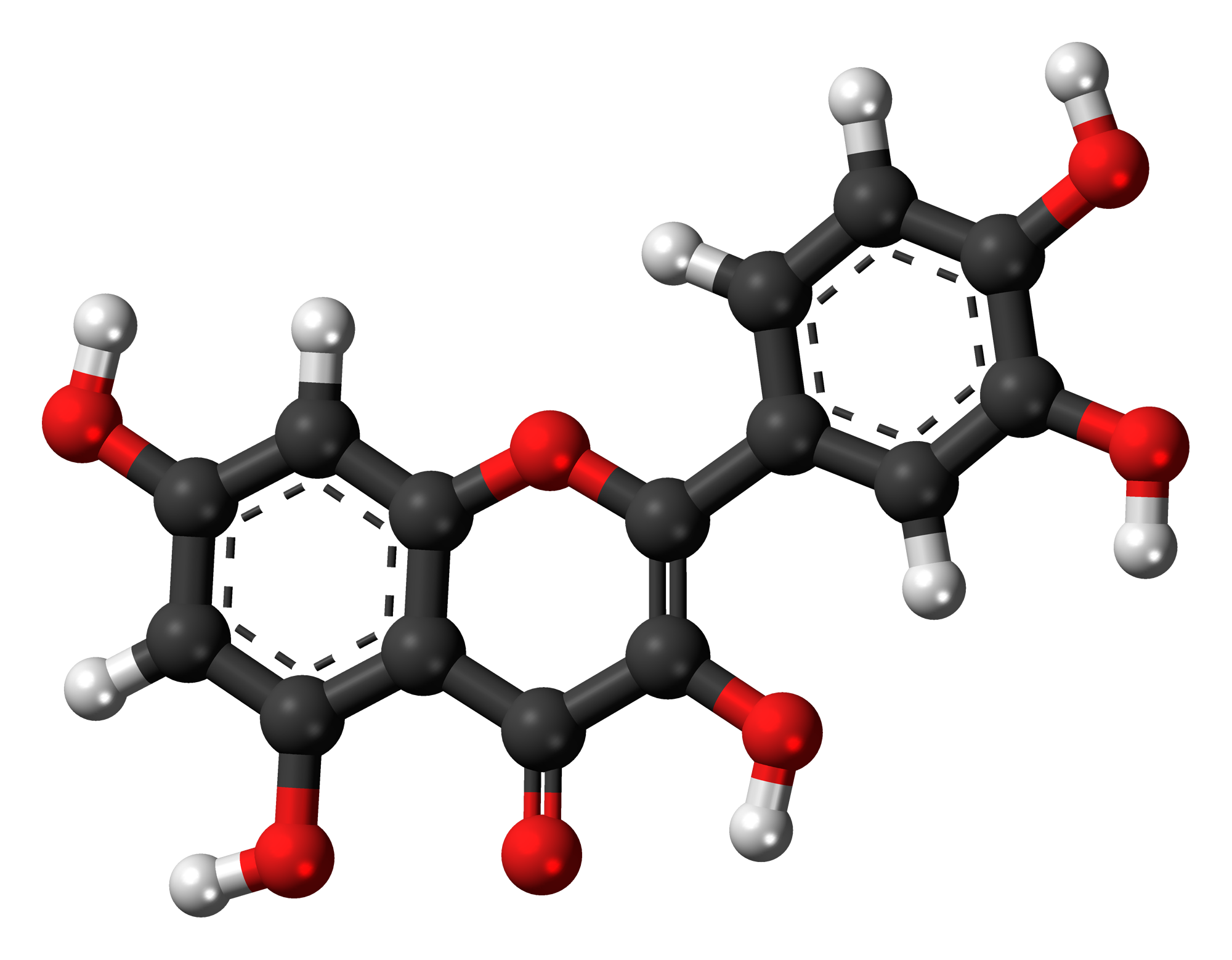

Names
Pronunciation	/ˈkwɜːrsɪtɪn/
- IUPAC name 3,3′,4′,5,7-Pentahydroxyflavone
- Systematic IUPAC name 2-(3,4-Dihydroxyphenyl)-3,5,7-trihydroxy-4H-1-benzopyran-4-one
- Other names 5,7,3′,4′-flavon-3-ol, Sophoretin, Meletin, Quercetine, Xanthaurine, Quercetol, Quercitin, Quertine, Flavin meletin

Identifiers
CAS Number	117-39-5; 6151-25-3 (dihydrate)
3D model (JSmol)	Interactive image
Beilstein Reference	317313
ChEBI	CHEBI:16243
ChEMBL	ChEMBL50
ChemSpider	4444051
DrugBank	DB04216
ECHA InfoCard	100.003.807
EC Number	204-187-1
Gmelin Reference	579210
IUPHAR/BPS	5346
KEGG	C00389
PubChem CID	5280343
UNII	9IKM0I5T1E; 53B03V78A6 (dihydrate)
UN number	2811
CompTox Dashboard (EPA)	DTXSID4021218
- InChI: InChI=1S/C15H10O7/c16-7-4-10(19)12-11(5-7)22-15(14(21)13(12)20)6-1-2-8(17)9(18)3-6/h1-5,16-19,21H Key: REFJWTPEDVJJIY-UHFFFAOYSA-N; InChI=1/C15H10O7/c16-7-4-10(19)12-11(5-7)22-15(14(21)13(12)20)6-1-2-8(17)9(18)3-6/h1-5,16-19,21H Key: REFJWTPEDVJJIY-UHFFFAOYAW
- SMILES: O=C1c3c(O/C(=C1/O)c2ccc(O)c(O)c2)cc(O)cc3O

Properties
Chemical formula	C_{15}H_{10}O_{7}
Molar mass	302.236 g/mol
Appearance	yellow crystalline powder
Density	1.799 g/cm^{3}
Melting point	316 °C (601 °F; 589 K)
Solubility in water	Practically insoluble in water; soluble in aqueous alkaline solutions
- Except where otherwise noted, data are given for materials in their standard state (at 25 °C [77 °F], 100 kPa). verify (what is ?) Infobox references

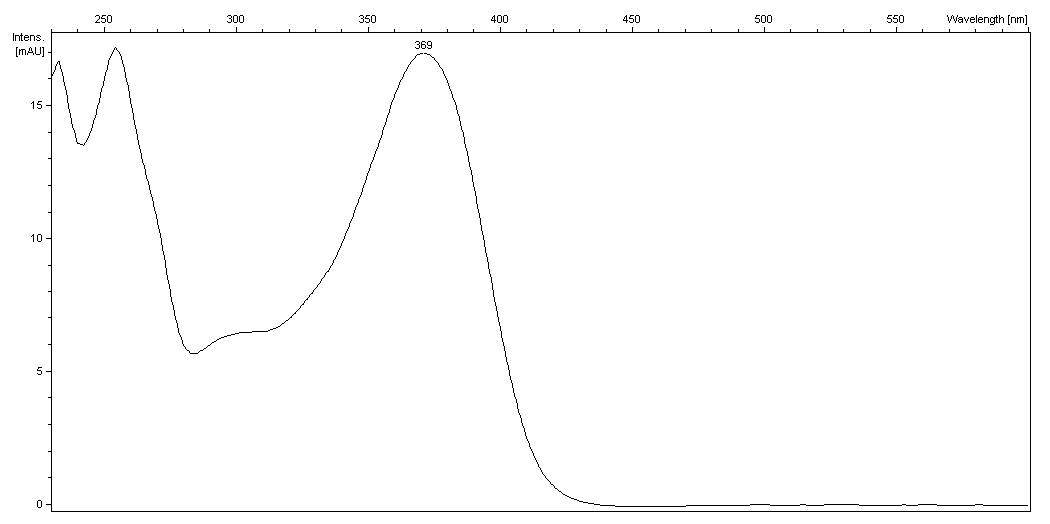
UV visible spectrum of quercetin, with lambda max at 369 nm

Quercetin is a plant flavonol from the flavonoid group of polyphenols. It is found in many fruits, vegetables, leaves, seeds, and grains; capers, red onions, and kale are common foods containing appreciable amounts of it. It has a bitter flavor and is used as an ingredient in dietary supplements, beverages, and foods.

== Occurrence ==
Quercetin is a flavonoid widely distributed in nature. The name has been used since 1857, and is derived from quercetum (oak forest), after the oak genus Quercus. It is a naturally occurring polar auxin transport inhibitor.

Quercetin is one of the most abundant dietary flavonoids, with an average daily consumption of 25–50 mg.

Foods	Quercetin, mg / 100 g
capers, raw	234
capers, canned	173
lovage leaves, raw	170
dock like sorrel	86
radish leaves	70
carob fiber	58
dill weed, fresh	55
coriander	53
yellow wax pepper, raw	51
fennel leaves	49
onion, red	32
radicchio	32
watercress	30
kale	23
chokeberry	19
bog blueberry	18
buckwheat seeds	15
cranberry	15
lingonberry	13
plums, black	12

In red onions, higher concentrations of quercetin occur in the outermost rings and in the part closest to the root, the latter being the part of the plant with the highest concentration. One study found that organically grown tomatoes had 79% more quercetin than non-organically grown fruit. Quercetin is present in various kinds of honey from different plant sources.

== Biosynthesis ==
In plants, phenylalanine is converted to 4-coumaroyl-CoA in a series of steps known as the general phenylpropanoid pathway using phenylalanine ammonia-lyase, cinnamate-4-hydroxylase, and 4-coumaroyl-CoA-ligase. One molecule of 4-coumaroyl-CoA is added to three molecules of malonyl-CoA to form tetrahydroxychalcone using 7,2′-dihydroxy-4′-methoxyisoflavanol synthase. Tetrahydroxychalcone is then converted into naringenin using chalcone isomerase.

Naringenin is converted into eriodictyol using flavanoid 3′-hydroxylase. Eriodictyol is then converted into dihydroquercetin with flavanone 3-hydroxylase, which is then converted into quercetin using flavonol synthase.

The positions of quercetin's hydroxyl groups influence its antioxidant activity. Specifically, hydroxyl groups at positions 3, 3', and 4' have been identified as important contributors to antioxidant reactions.

=== Glycosides ===
3-O-Glycosides of quercetin

Quercetin is the aglycone form of a number of other flavonoid glycosides, such as rutin (also known as quercetin-3-O-rutinoside) and quercitrin, found in citrus fruit, buckwheat, and onions. Quercetin forms the glycosides quercitrin and rutin together with rhamnose and rutinose, respectively. Likewise guaijaverin is the 3-O-arabinoside, hyperoside is the 3-O-galactoside, isoquercitin is the 3-O-glucoside and spiraeoside is the 4′-O-glucoside. CTN-986 is a quercetin derivative found in cottonseeds and cottonseed oil. Miquelianin is the quercetin 3-O-β-D-glucuronopyranoside.

Several taxifolin (also known as dihydroquercetin) glycosides also exist. Isoquercetin is the 3-O-glucoside of quercetin.

=== Rutin degradation pathway ===
The enzyme quercitrinase can be found in Aspergillus flavus. This enzyme hydrolyzes the glycoside quercitrin to release quercetin and L-rhamnose. It is an enzyme in the rutin catabolic pathway.

=== UV Degradation ===
Ultraviolet radiation can cause quercetin to degrade; specifically, exposure to UVA and UVB radiation can cause quercetin to degrade in alcoholic solutions. One photodegradation study identified an oxidation product formed through the addition of an alcohol molecule across quercetin's 2,3 double bond.

=== Effect of pH ===
The UV-vis absorption spectrum of quercetin depends on pH because its ionization state changes with solution acidity. Buchweitz and colleagues reported a dissociation constant (pKa) of 7.08 ± 0.04.

=== Complex Formation ===
Quercetin can form coordination complexes with transition metal ions, including iron(II), copper(II), and zinc(II). Research using electrospray ionization tandem mass spectrometry investigated quercetin's coordination with these ions and the role of its hydroxyl and carbonyl groups in metal binding.

== Pharmacology ==
=== Pharmacokinetics ===
The bioavailability of quercetin in humans after oral intake is very low, with one study concluding it must be less than 1%. Intravenous injection of quercetin shows a rapid decay in concentration described by a two-compartment model (initial half-life of 8.8 minutes, terminal half-life of 2.4 hours). Because it undergoes rapid and extensive metabolism, the biological effects presumed from in vitro studies are unlikely to apply in vivo. Quercetin supplements in the aglycone form are less bioavailable than the quercetin glycoside often found in foods, especially red onions. Ingestion with high-fat foods may increase bioavailability compared to ingestion with low-fat foods, and carbohydrate-rich foods may increase absorption of quercetin by stimulating gastrointestinal motility and colonic fermentation. Whereas quercetin has been shown to be a potent anti-inflammatory compound in a variety of in vitro and in vivo bioassay models, oral quercetin in human subjects has not exhibited the desired effects. Quercetin has low water solubility. Studies of its interactions with bile-salt micelles have shown that its partitioning behavior depends on its ionization state, so low solubility affects its ability to interact with these micelles. Because of low solubility and poor bioavailability of quercetin, derivatives have been synthesized to overcome these challenges and enhance its biological activity, leading to compounds with improved properties for possible therapeutic applications.

=== Metabolism ===
Quercetin is rapidly metabolized (via glucuronidation) after the ingestion of quercetin foods or supplements. Five metabolites (quercetin glucuronides) have been found in human plasma after quercetin ingestion. Taken together, the quercetin glucuronides have a half-life around 11–12 hours.

In rats, quercetin did not undergo any significant phase I metabolism. In contrast, quercetin did undergo extensive phase II (conjugation) to produce metabolites that are more polar than the parent substance, hence are more rapidly excreted from the body. In vitro, the meta-hydroxyl group of catechol is methylated by catechol-O-methyltransferase. Four of the five hydroxyl groups of quercetin are glucuronidated by UDP-glucuronosyltransferase. The exception is the 5-hydroxyl group of the flavonoid ring, which generally does not undergo glucuronidation. The major metabolites of orally absorbed quercetin are quercetin-3-glucuronide, 3'-methylquercetin-3-glucuronide, and quercetin-3'-sulfate. A methyl metabolite of quercetin has been shown in vitro to be more effective than quercetin at inhibiting lipopolysaccharide-activated macrophages.

Compared to other flavonoids, quercetin is one of the most effective inducers of the phase II detoxification enzymes.

In vitro studies show that quercetin is a strong inhibitor of the cytochrome P450 enzymes CYP3A4 and CYP2C19 and a moderate inhibitor of CYP2D6. Drugs that are metabolized by these pathways may have increased effect. An in vivo study found that quercetin supplementation slows the metabolism of caffeine to a statistically significant extent in a particular genetic subpopulation, but in absolute terms the effect was almost negligible. Quercetin is an inhibitor of CYP1B1 and CYP46A1.

== Food safety ==
In 2010, the U. S. Food and Drug Administration acknowledged high-purity quercetin as generally recognized as safe for use as an ingredient in various specified food categories at levels up to 500 mg per serving.

== Health claims ==
Quercetin has been studied in basic research and small clinical trials. While supplements have been promoted for the treatment of cancer and various other diseases, there is no high-quality evidence that quercetin (via supplements or in food) is useful to treat cancer or any other disease.

The US Food and Drug Administration has issued warning letters to several manufacturers advertising on their product labels and websites that quercetin product(s) can be used to treat diseases. The FDA regards such quercetin advertising and products as unapproved – with unauthorized health claims concerning the anti-disease products – as defined by "sections 201(g)(1)(B) and/or 201 (g)(1)(C) of the Act [21 U.S.C. § 321(g)(1)(B) and/or 21 U.S.C. § 321(g)(1)(C)] because they are intended for use in the diagnosis, cure, mitigation, treatment, or prevention of disease", conditions not met by the manufacturers.

=== Safety ===
Little research has been conducted into the safety of quercetin supplementation in humans, and the results are insufficient to give confidence that the practice is safe. In particular, a lack of safety information exists on the effect of quercetin supplementation for pregnant women, breastfeeding women, children, and adolescents. The hormonal effects of quercetin found in animal studies raise the suspicion of a parallel effect in humans, particularly in respect of estrogen-dependent tumors.

Quercetin supplementation can interfere with the effects of medications. The precise nature of this interaction is known for some common medicines, but for many, it is not.

== See also ==
- List of ineffective cancer treatments
- Flavonol 3-sulfotransferase
- Phenolic compounds in wine
- Phytochemical
- Quercetin 2,3-dioxygenase
- Quercetin 3-O-methyltransferase
- Quercetin-3-sulfate 3'-sulfotransferase
- Quercetin-3-sulfate 4'-sulfotransferase
- Quercetin-3,3'-bissulfate 7-sulfotransferase
