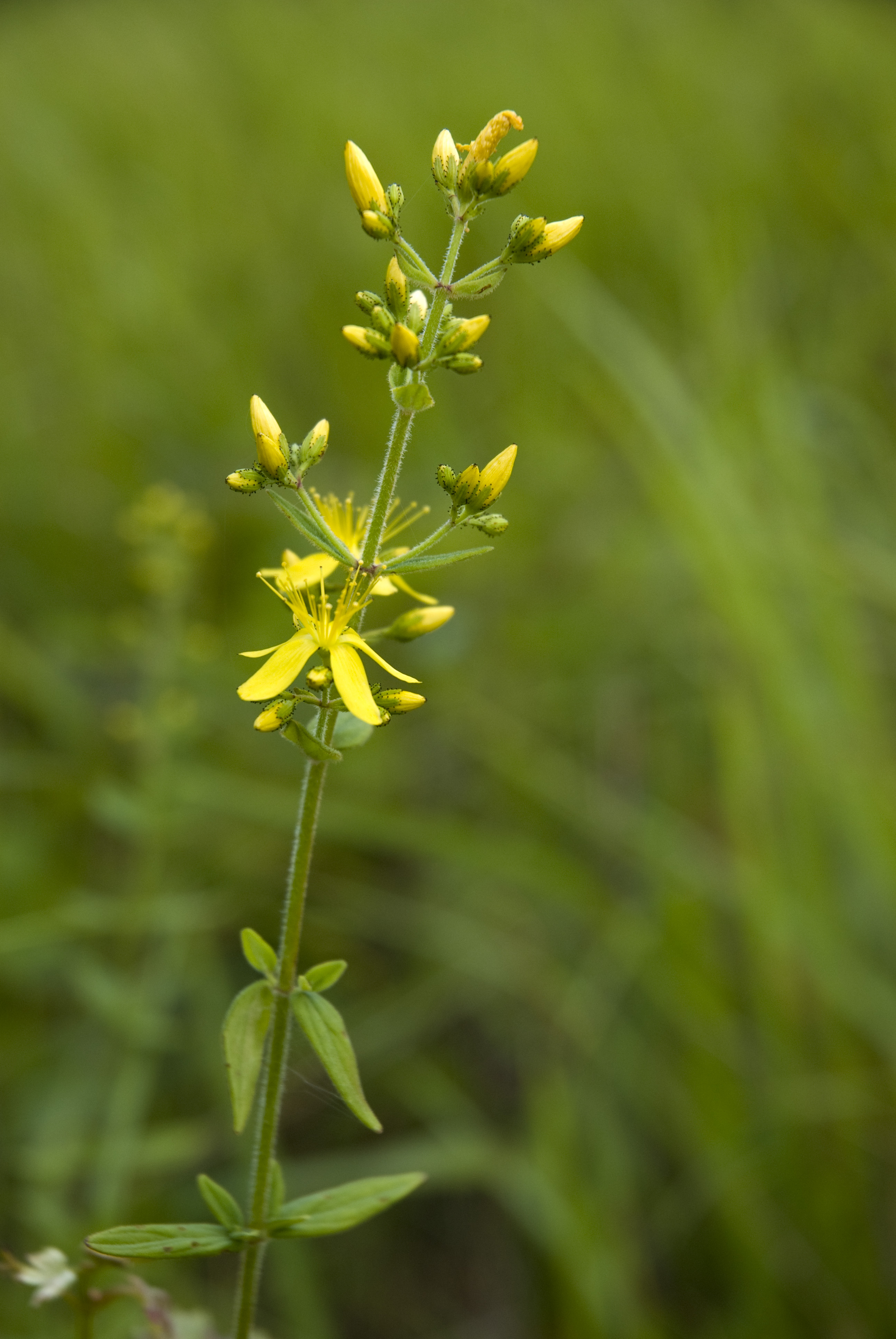
- In Coteau de Chartèves (Aisne), France

Scientific classification
- Kingdom: Plantae
- Clade: Tracheophytes
- Clade: Angiosperms
- Clade: Eudicots
- Clade: Rosids
- Order: Malpighiales
- Family: Hypericaceae
- Genus: Hypericum
- Section: H. sect. Taeniocarpium
- Species: H. hirsutum

Binomial name
- Hypericum hirsutum L.

= Hypericum hirsutum =

Species of flowering plant in the St John's wort family

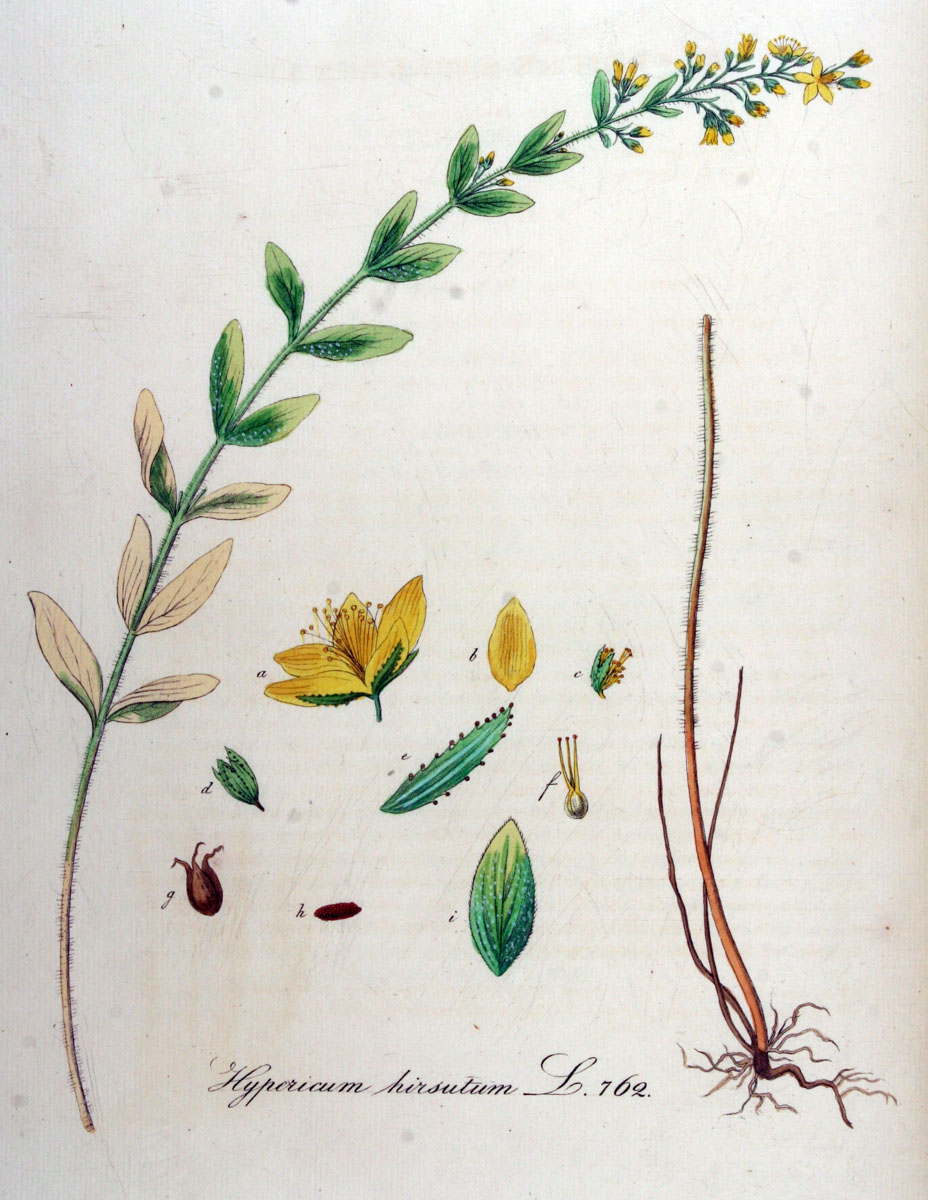
Botanical illustration

Hypericum hirsutum is a species of flowering plant in the family Hypericaceae, commonly known as hairy St John's-wort. It is found in Western Europe.

== Description ==
Hypericum hirsutum is a downy perennial plant that grows to two or three feet. It has erect stems and opposite pairs of untoothed, elongated oval leaves with translucent glandular dots. The terminal inflorescences have many pale yellow flowers. Each has five pointed sepals with stalked black dots on the margins. The five petals also may have black dots and the many stamens are in bundles. Hairy St John's wort is very similar to common St John's wort (H. perforatum) but can be distinguished by the downy stems and the much longer leaves.

=== Phytochemistry ===
Miquelianin (Quercetin 3-O-glucuronide), a type of phenolic compound, is present in H. hirsutum.

== Distribution ==
Hypericum hirsutum is a species of temperate regions and grows in Europe and western Siberia. It is uncommon and localised in Finland which is to the north of its European range In Britain it is a widespread species except for the far north and west while it is rare and localised in Ireland being found at only two sites in Northern Ireland and with its Irish range centred around County Dublin.

== Habitat and ecology ==
Hypericum hirsutum is a perennial herb which prefers free-draining, neutral to base-rich soils. It grows in open or partially shaded habitats such as rough and ungrazed grassland, clearings and rides in woodland, on the banks of rivers and road verges. In Britain it has an altitudinal range from sea level to 450 metres (1,480 ft) in Cumberland. At the very northern extreme of its range, in south-western Finland it grows in the open, lime rich situations and does not grow in shade.
