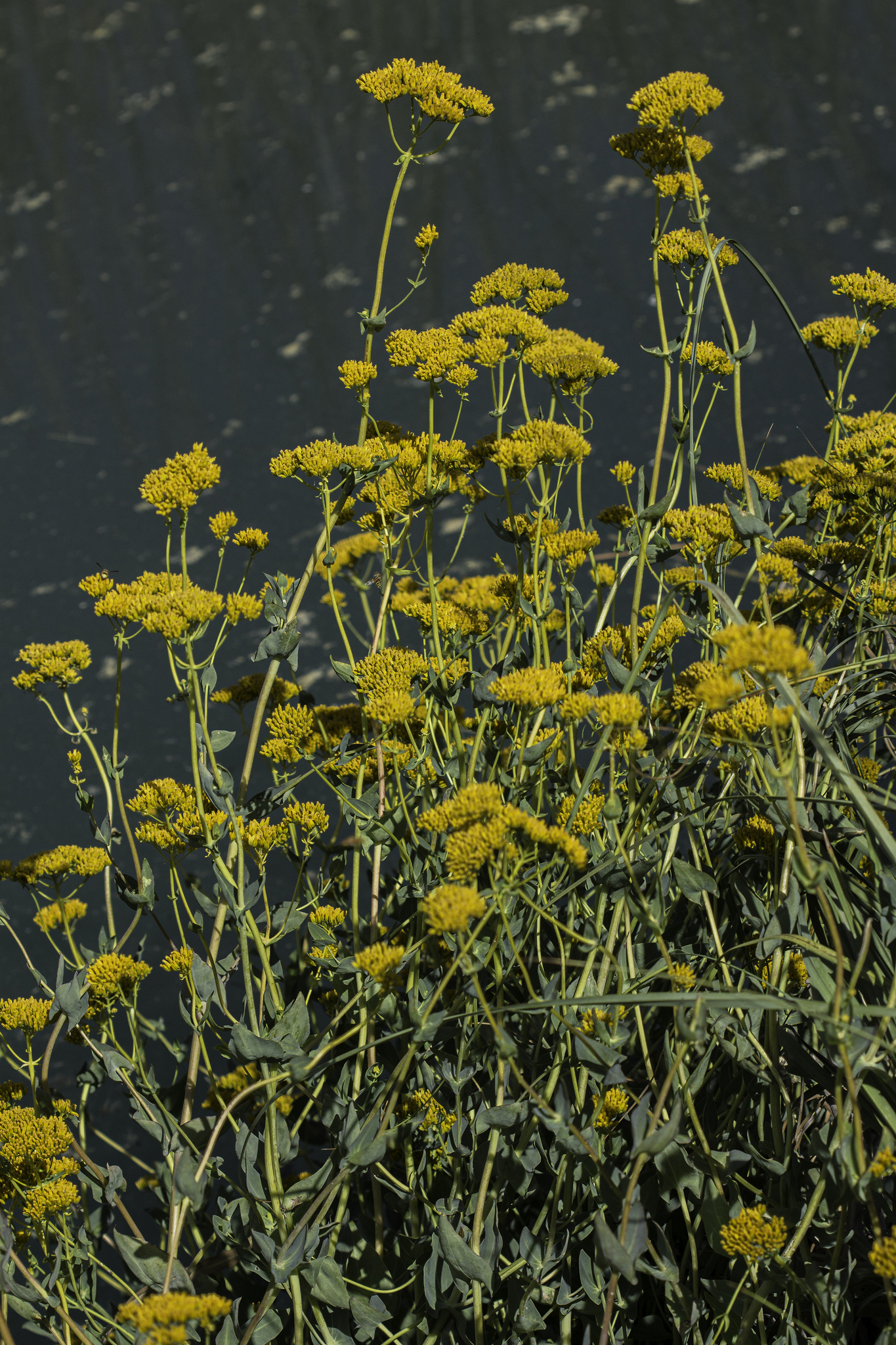

Scientific classification
- Kingdom: Plantae
- Clade: Tracheophytes
- Clade: Angiosperms
- Clade: Eudicots
- Clade: Asterids
- Order: Asterales
- Family: Asteraceae
- Genus: Flaveria
- Species: F. chlorifolia

Binomial name
- Flaveria chlorifolia A.Gray

Synonyms
- Flaveria chloraefolia A.Gray

= Flaveria chlorifolia =

Species of flowering plant

Flaveria chlorifolia, the clasping yellowtops, is a North American plant species of Flaveria within the family Asteraceae. It is native to the southwestern United States (New Mexico, western Texas) and northern Mexico (Chihuahua, Coahuila, Nuevo León).

Flaveria chlorifolia is a perennial herb up to 200 cm (80 inches or 6 2/3 feet) tall. One plant can sometimes produce 150 or more flower heads in a branching array, each head with 9-14 yellow disc flowers but no ray flowers.

== Chemical composition ==
Quercetin-3-sulfate 3'-sulfotransferase is an enzyme that uses 3'-phosphoadenylyl sulfate and quercetin 3-sulfate to produce adenosine 3',5'-bisphosphate and quercetin 3,3'-bissulfate. The enzyme can be found in F. chlorifolia.

Ombuin 3-sulfate, the sulfate conjugate of ombuin, can be isolated from F. chlorifolia.
