= Sarsaparilla =

Sarsaparilla often refers to the sarsaparilla soft drink, made from Smilax plants.

Sarsaparilla may also refer to:

== Biology ==
- Several species of plants, of the genus Smilax, including:
  - Smilax ornata, also known as Honduran or Jamaican sarsaparilla
  - Smilax aristolochiifolia, known as Mexican sarsaparilla
  - Smilax aspera, a flowering vine found in southern Europe, Africa and south Asia
  - Smilax glyciphylla, sweet sarsaparilla, native to Eastern Australia
  - Smilax officinalis, native to Central and South America
- Other plant species known by the same name include:
  - Alphitonia, known as sarsaparilla in Australia
  - Hardenbergia violacea, known as sarsaparilla in Australia
  - Aralia nudicaulis, known as wild sarsaparilla
  - Hemidesmus indicus, or Indian sarsaparilla

== See also ==
- Sassparilla (band), a roots-rock band based in Portland, Oregon
- Jade and Sarsaparilla, American musical act of the 1970s
