= Bamboo vine =

Bamboo vine is a common name for several plants species in the genus Smilax and may refer to:

- Smilax bona-nox, native to the Southern United States, and eastern Mexico
- Smilax laurifolia, native to the southeastern United States
- Smilax pseudochina, native to the Atlantic Coast of the United States
