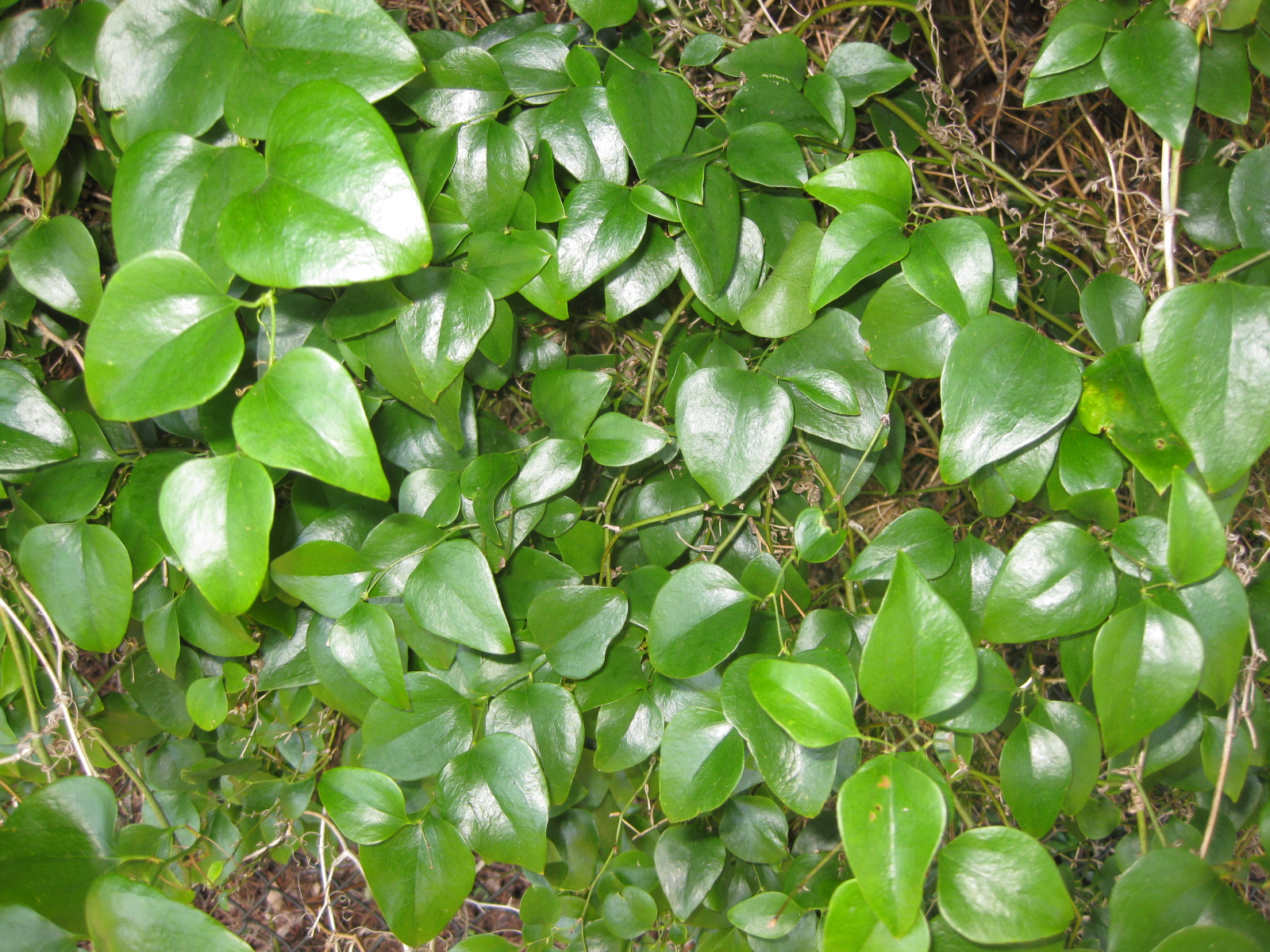

Conservation status
- Secure (NatureServe)

Scientific classification
- Kingdom: Plantae
- Clade: Tracheophytes
- Clade: Angiosperms
- Clade: Monocots
- Order: Liliales
- Family: Smilacaceae
- Genus: Smilax
- Species: S. rotundifolia

Binomial name
- Smilax rotundifolia L.

Synonyms
- Smilax caduca L.; Smilax quadrangularis Muhl. ex Willd.; Smilax deltifolia Raf.; Smilax platoplis Raf.; Smilax tetragona M.Martens & Galeotti; Smilax engelmanniana Kunth; Smilax sprengelii Kunth

= Smilax rotundifolia =

Species of plant

Smilax rotundifolia, also known as roundleaf greenbrier or common greenbrier, or bamboo vine in parts of the South, is a woody vine native to the southeastern and eastern United States and eastern Canada. It is a common and conspicuous part of the natural forest ecosystems in much of its native range. The leaves are glossy green, petioled, alternate, and circular to heart-shaped. They are generally 5–13 cm long. Common greenbrier climbs other plants using green tendrils growing out of the petioles.

The stems are rounded and green and are armed with sharp spines. The flowers are greenish white, and are produced from April to August. The fruit is a bluish black berry that ripens in September.

== Cultivation and uses ==
The young shoots of common greenbrier are reported to be excellent when cooked like asparagus. The young leaves and tendrils can be prepared like spinach or added directly to salads. Being familiar with eating Smilax is common in the South Carolina Lowcountry, where Smilax is often called 'chaineybriar.' The roots have a natural gelling agent in them that can be extracted and used as a thickening agent.

== Description ==
Like its common names suggest, Smilax rotundifolia is a green vine with thorns. It is a crawling vine that can tangle itself within other plants and climb with small tendrils.

The plant can grow up to 20 feet long by climbing objects and vegetation. If there is nothing for it to climb upon it will grow along the ground. It has woody stems that are pale green in color and are glabrous, the youngest of which are often square-shaped. As the vine dies, the stem turns from green to a dark brown color. Along the stem there are often black-tipped thorns that are about 1/3-inch-long. Some stems of Common green brier do not have thorns.

The upper surfaces of the leaves are darker than the undersides. The rounded alternate leaves are about 2 to 5 inches long. The leaves are glabrous and never glaucous. There are 3 to 5 primary veins per leaf. Along the lower surfaces of the primary veins it is possible to find small prickles but they are not always present. The petioles are a quarter to half an inch long, light green in color and glabrous. Small sheaths with terminal tendrils are present at the base of each petiole.

Common greenbrier has greenish white flowers that form in umbels of 3–20 flowers. The peduncles upon which the umbels of flowers are borne originate from the axils of the leaves. Male and female flowers are produced on different plant, as this genus is dioecious. Both male and female flowers are about the same size at a quarter inch long. The flowers bloom for about two weeks in late spring and early summer. After this blooming period the female flowers are replaced by a berry containing up to three seeds.

== Fire ecology ==
Smilax rotundifolia grows from rhizomes so it can resist fire by resprouting. Fires that open the canopies of dense forests encourage the growth of Smilax rotundifolia.

In New Hampshire it was found that Smilax rotundifolia responds to fire with rapid vigorous vegetative growth in the spring and fall. This was found in a prescribed burn in a white pine forest with low intensity flames (20 inches (50 cm) flame heights). After two years the amount of Smilax rotundifolia was back to the original density. Using different frequencies and intensities of fire no difference was found.

== Habitat and distribution ==
Smilax rotundifolia is found in the eastern half of the continental United States including Texas, South Dakota, and Oklahoma with the exception of Vermont. It ranges from Florida north into Northern Ontario. Smilax rotundifolia is native to the USA.

Common greenbrier grows along roadsides, landscapes, clearings and woods. In clearings it often forms dense and impassable thickets. It can be found in almost all habitat types including wetlands.

== Wildlife ==
The berries and leaves often persist into late winter. Smilax rotundifolia is a very important food plant in the winter while there are more limited food choices. Examples of wildlife that will eat the berries and leaves in the late winter and early spring are Northern Cardinals, white throated sparrows, white tailed deer, and rabbits.

== Conservation ==
In most states S. rotundifolia is categorized as Least Concern due to its relative abundance.

== Uses ==
=== Food ===
Young shoots and uncurled leaves and tendrils can be eaten raw or cooked.

=== Ethnobotany ===
In the genus Smilax there are many different uses of the plant for medical treatments around the world. The Cherokee use Smilax rotundifolia to treat pain in the leg. Smilax rotundifolia vines and roots boiled together with tea was used to treat an upset stomach. When drinking this tea mixture a prayer was spoken.

== Taxonomy ==
The catbrier family, Smilacaceae, contains the genus Smilax. Smilax contains some 300 species including S. rotundifolia, the common green brier. Other species in the genus include Smilax glauca, the cat greenbrier, Smilax china, china root, and Smilax aspera, rough bindweed.

The genus Smilax was originally described by Linnaeus. Smilax rotundifolia was also described by Linnaeus.
