= Roots wine =

Roots wine, more commonly known as "roots drink" or "herbal drink", is a type of medicinal beverage popular in Jamaica. It is believed to have healthful and aphrodisiacal qualities for men.

Roots wine is made from a variety of herbs and roots, often blended with honey or molasses. It is naturally fermented and slightly effervescent, typically containing less than 5% alcohol.

== Ingredients ==
Typical ingredients could include:

water
brown sugar
molasses
chainy root (Smilax balbisiana)
sarsaparilla (Smilax regilii)
tan pan rock (Dryopteris filix-mas)

search mi heart (Rhytidophyllum tomentosum)
dandelion (Cassia occidentalis)
blood wiss (Vitis tiliifolia)
raw moon (Trophis racemosa)
medina (Alysicarpus vaginalis)
coconut root (Cocos nucifera)

mint (Mentha sp.)
cola bark (Cola)
strongback or strongbark (Bourreria ovata)
chew stick (Gouania lupuloides)
cherry bark (Vanilla claviculata)
giant wisp (Brosimum alicastrum)

poor-man-friend (Stylosanthes viscosa)
man back (Desmodium incanum)
blood wisp (Iresine diffusa)
sassafras (Sassafras albidum)
hops (Humulus lupulus)
nerve wisp (Drymaria cordata)

== See also ==
- Jamaican cuisine
- List of Jamaican dishes
- Baba Roots
