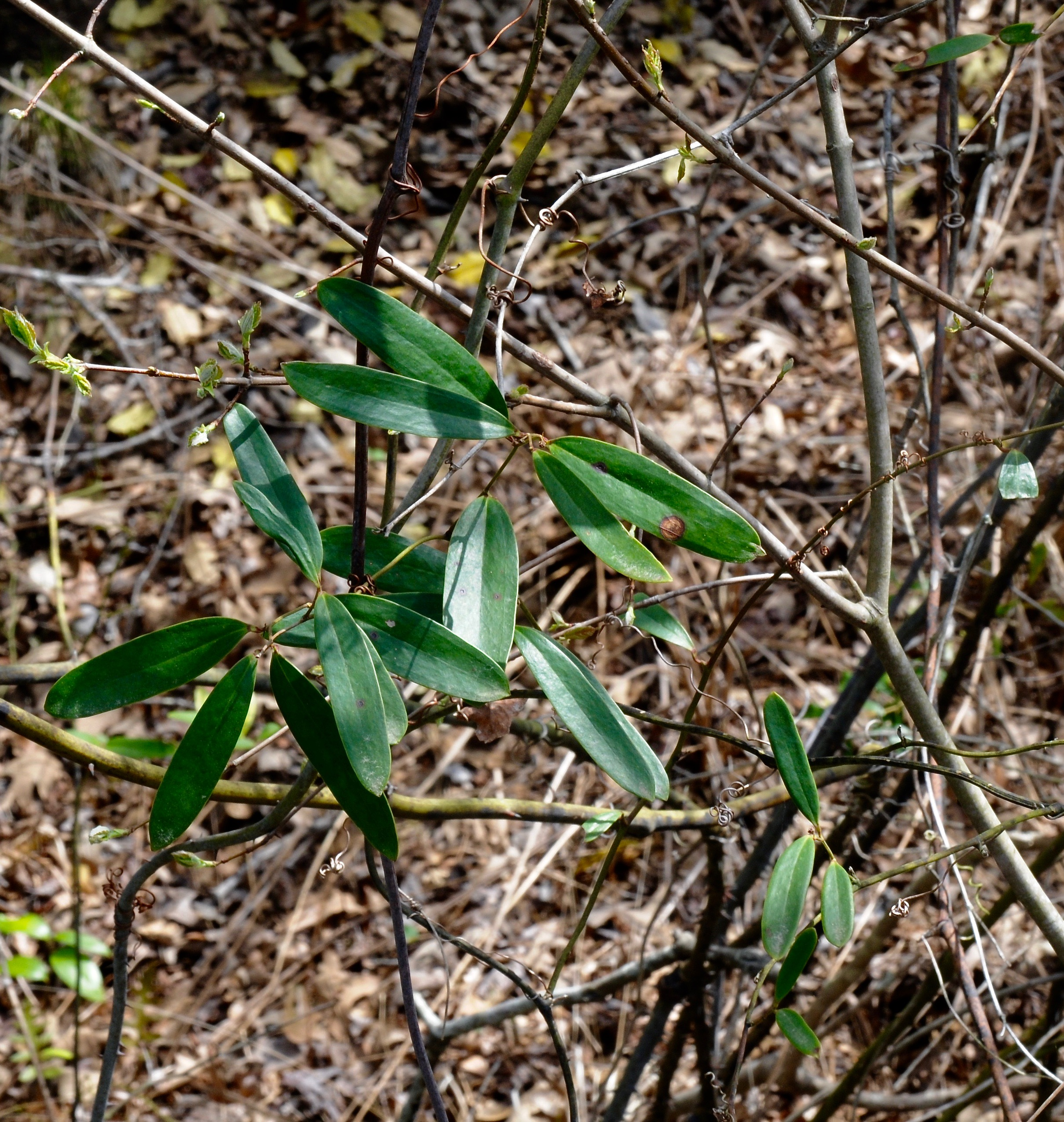

Conservation status
- Secure (NatureServe)

Scientific classification
- Kingdom: Plantae
- Clade: Tracheophytes
- Clade: Angiosperms
- Clade: Monocots
- Order: Liliales
- Family: Smilacaceae
- Genus: Smilax
- Species: S. laurifolia

Binomial name
- Smilax laurifolia L. 1753 not Roxb. 1832

Synonyms
- Parillax laurifolia (L.) Raf.; Smilax lanceolata L.; Smilax virginiana Mill.; Smilax alba Pursh

= Smilax laurifolia =

Species of flowering plant

Smilax laurifolia is a species of flowering plant in the greenbrier family known by the common names laurel greenbrier, laurelleaf greenbrier, bamboo vine, and blaspheme vine. It is native to the southeastern United States, where it occurs along the Gulf Coastal Plain and Atlantic Plain from Texas to New Jersey, the range extending inland to Arkansas, Oklahoma, and Tennessee. It also occurs in Cuba and the Bahamas.

== Description ==
This plant is a Monocotyledonous woody vine that forms dense colonial thickets and climbs over other vegetation. The stems reach five meters or more in length. They are "viciously armed" with prickles that may be over a centimeter long. The plant grows from a huge woody, tuberous rhizome. The sprouts may grow up to 7 centimeters per day. The leathery evergreen leaves are linear, lance-shaped, or oval and reach 13 centimeters long by 6 wide. The petioles twist to bear the leaves in an erect position. The inflorescence is an umbel of up to 25 flowers borne in the leaf axils. Each flower has whitish or yellowish tepals each about half a centimeter long. The fruit is a shiny, waxy black berry 5 to 8 millimeters long. The berries mature in the second growing season after they first appear.

== Distribution and habitat ==
This plant grows in bogs, swamps, and marshy areas. It is a dominant plant in pocosins. The soils are wet to saturated and the sites are often flooded. It is common in the Everglades and it is "characteristic" of the Okefenokee Swamp understory flora. It grows beneath cypress, swamp blackgum (N. sylvatica), white bay (Magnolia virginiana), loblolly bay (Gordonia lasianthus), sweet bay (Tamala borbonia), red maple (Acer rubrum), cassena (Ilex cassine), titi (Cyrilla racemiflora), and southern white cedar (Chamaecyparis thyoides). In the understory it is associated with hurrahbush (Lyonia lucida), leucothoe (Leucothoe racemosa), sweetspire (Itea virginica), poor-man's soap (Clethra alnifolia), coral greenbrier (S. walteri), and honeycup (Zenobia pulverulenta).

This plant competes with and inhibits tree seedlings such as those of southern white cedar. In sunny sites it grows better and can form dense thickets. When burned or damaged it resprouts vigorously from its large rhizome. This rapidly climbing vine is a silvicultural pest.

== Ecology ==
This plant provides habitat for many types of animals, such as white-tailed deer, bobcat, gray squirrel, Eastern diamondback rattlesnake, American alligator, Pine Barrens tree frog, and the endangered red-cockaded woodpecker. It grows alongside a variety of rare such as white wickey (Kalmia cuneata), arrowleaf shieldwort (Peltandra sagittaefolia), spring-flowering goldenrod (Solidago verna), and rough-leaf loostrife (Lysimachia asperulifolia).

== Uses ==
Native American groups used this plant medicinally. For example, the Cherokee used it for sores and burns. The tuberous rhizome was also a food source; the Choctaw made it into fried cakes and bread.
