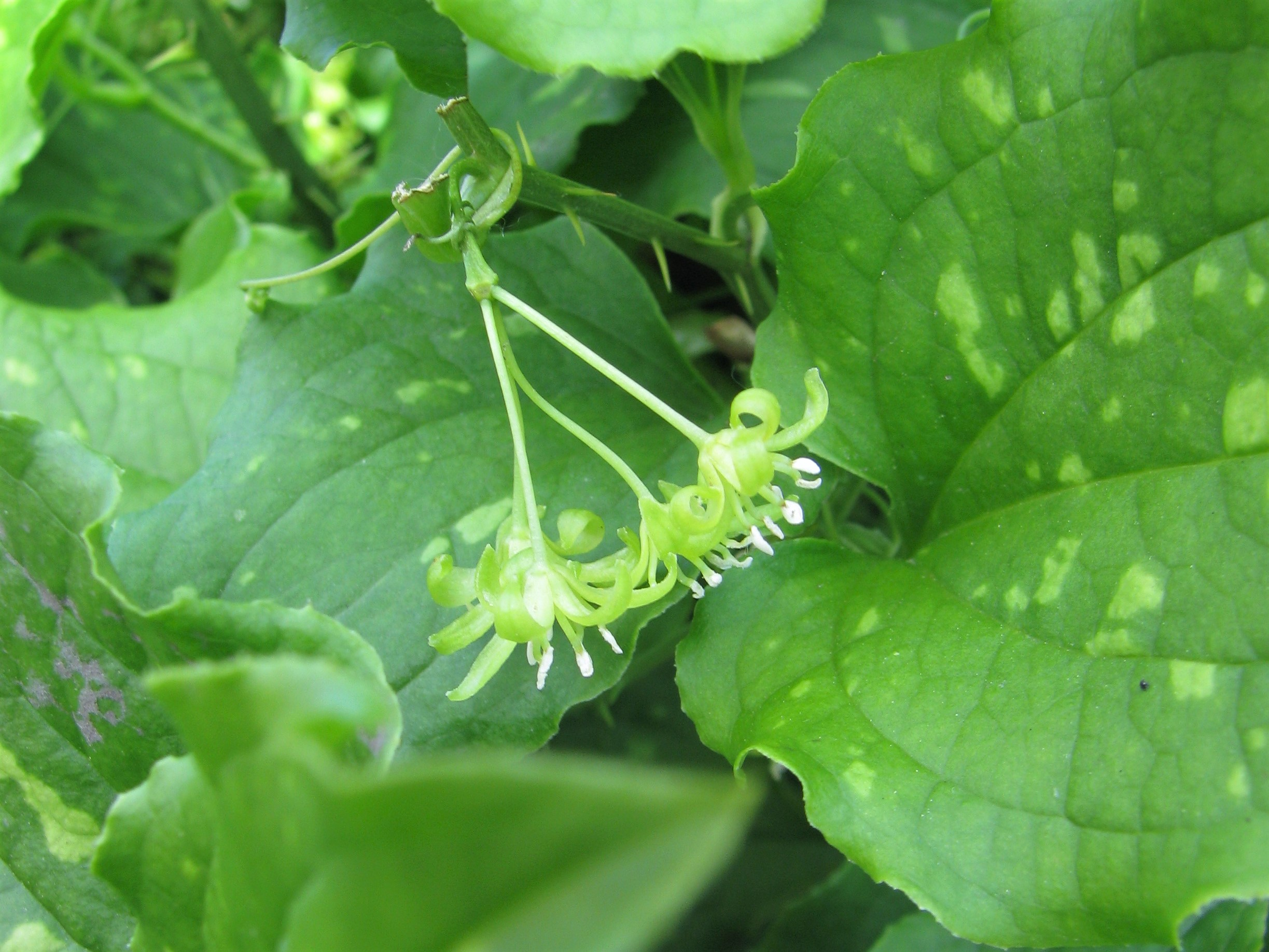

Scientific classification
- Kingdom: Plantae
- Clade: Tracheophytes
- Clade: Angiosperms
- Clade: Monocots
- Order: Liliales
- Family: Smilacaceae
- Genus: Smilax
- Species: S. tamnoides

Binomial name
- Smilax tamnoides L. 1753

Synonyms
- Smilax hispida Muhl. ex Torr. 1843, illegitimate homonym not Raf. 1840; Smilax medica Petz. & G.Kirchn. 1864, illegitimate homonym not Schltdl. & Cham. 1831; Dilax muricata Raf.; Smilax grandifolia Buckley

= Smilax tamnoides =

Bristly greenbrier

Species of flowering plant

Smilax tamnoides, common name bristly greenbrier, is a North American species of plants native to the United States and Canada. It is widespread from Ontario and New York State south to Texas and Florida.

The plant has been called Smilax hispida in many publications, but the name Smilax tamnoides is much older and under the botanical rules of priority it is the preferred name.

== Description ==
Smilax tamnoides may grow as a shrub or a climbing, prickly vine that supports itself on other vegetation. When growing as a vine, it may grow up to 9.1 to 13.7 meters (30-45 feet) in length. Flowers are green to brown, small but numerous in umbels; fruits blue to black without the waxy coating common on many other species of the genus.

== Habitat ==
S. tamnoides may be found in habitat types such as mixed pine forests, wooded hammocks, wooded ravines, and river bluffs, among others.

== Conservation status in the United States ==
It is listed as a special concern species and believed extirpated in Connecticut.
