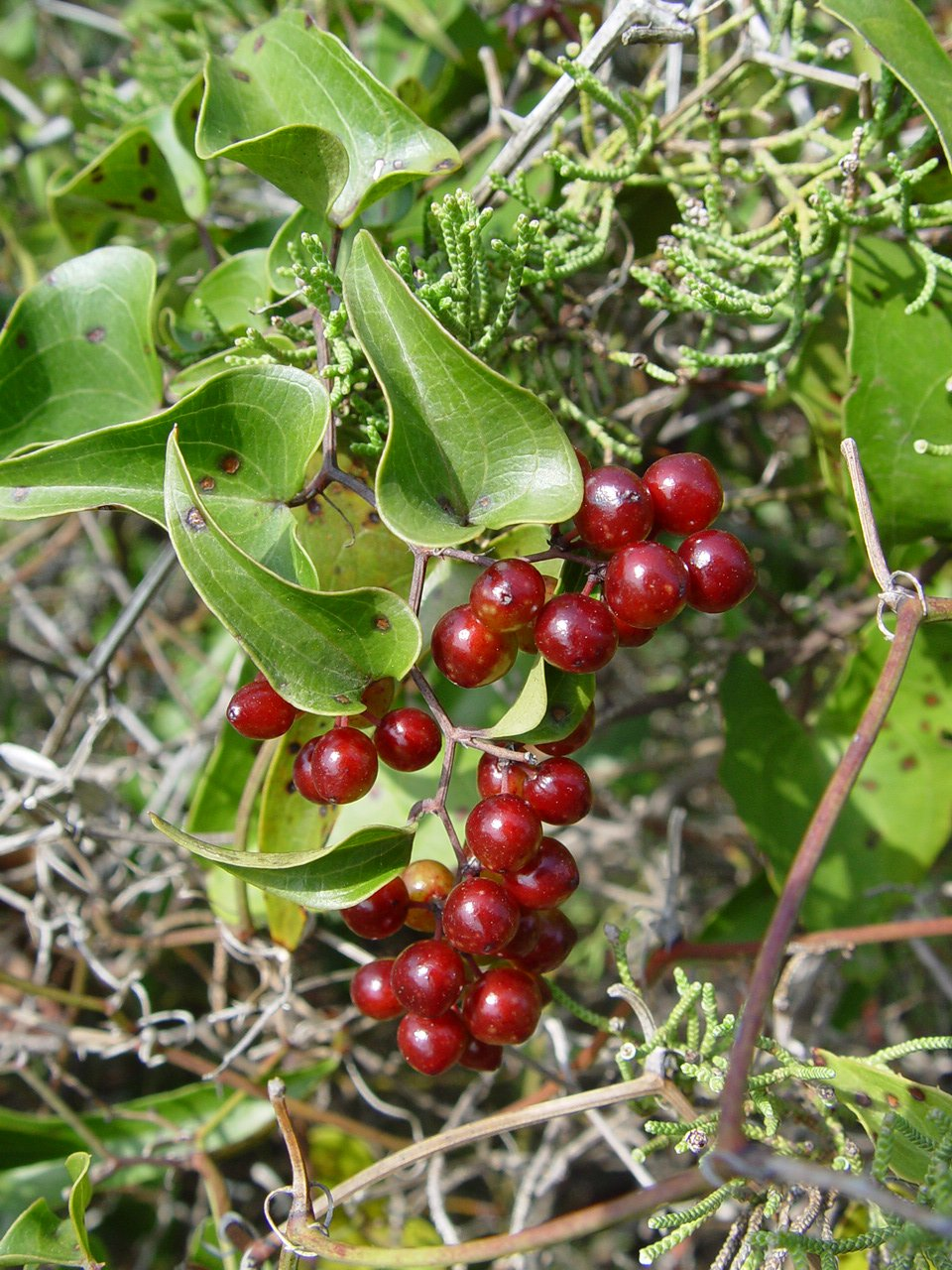

Scientific classification
- Kingdom: Plantae
- Clade: Tracheophytes
- Clade: Angiosperms
- Clade: Monocots
- Order: Liliales
- Family: Smilacaceae
- Genus: Smilax
- Species: S. aspera

Binomial name
- Smilax aspera L.

Synonyms
- List: Smilax balearica (Willk. ex A.DC.) Burnat & Barbey; Smilax brevipes Jord. nom. illeg.; Smilax capitata Buch.-Ham. ex D.Don nom. inval.; Smilax catalonica Poir.; Smilax conferta Jord.; Smilax excelsa Duhamel nom. inval.; Smilax goetzeana Engl.; Smilax inermis Jord. nom. illeg.; Smilax intricatissima Jord.; Smilax longipes Gand.; Smilax maculata Roxb.; Smilax maculata Roxb. ex D.Don; Smilax mauritanica Desf. nom. illeg.; Smilax mauritanica Poir.; Smilax mauritanica Webb & Berthel. nom. illeg.; Smilax nigra Willd.; Smilax nilagirensis Steud. ex A.DC. nom. inval.; Smilax oxycarpa Jord.; Smilax peduncularis Jord. nom. illeg.; Smilax pendulina Lowe; Smilax picta K.Koch; Smilax platyphylla Jord.; Smilax rettiana Willis ex Livera; Smilax rigida Sol. ex Sm.; Smilax sagittata Desv. ex Ham.; Smilax sagittifolia Lodd.; Smilax saxicola Gand.; Smilax tetragona L.f.; Smilax variabilis Pers.; Smilax willkommii Gand.

= Smilax aspera =

Species of flowering plant

Smilax aspera, with common names common smilax, rough bindweed, sarsaparille, and Mediterranean smilax, is a species of flowering vine in the greenbriar family.

== Description ==
Smilax aspera is a perennial, evergreen climber with a flexible and delicate stem, with sharp thorns. The climbing stem is 1–4 metres (3 ft 3 in – 13 ft 1 in) long. The leaves are 8–10 centimetres (3.1–3.9 in) long, petiolated, alternate, tough, leathery, and heart-shaped, with toothed and spiny margins. It is a monocot with reticulate venation. The midrib of the underside of the leaf is also provided with spines. The flowers, very fragrant, are small, yellowish or greenish, gathered in axillary racemes. The flowering period in Mediterranean regions extends from September to November. The fruits are globose berries, gathered in clusters, which ripen in autumn. They are initially red, later turning black. They have a diameter of 8–10 millimetres (0.31–0.39 in) and contain one to three tiny and round seeds. They are insipid and unpalatable to humans, but they are a source of nourishment for many species of birds.

== Distribution ==
This species is widespread in Central Africa (Democratic Republic of Congo, Kenya, Ethiopia), Mediterranean Europe (Cyprus, Albania, Croatia, Greece, Italy, Malta, Montenegro, France, Portugal, Spain), temperate Asia ( Israel, Jordan, Lebanon, Syria, Turkey) and tropical Asia (India, Bhutan, Nepal). It is also naturalized in other regions.

== Habitat ==
It grows in woods and scrub at an altitude of 0–1,200 metres (0–3,937 ft) above sea level.

== Gallery ==
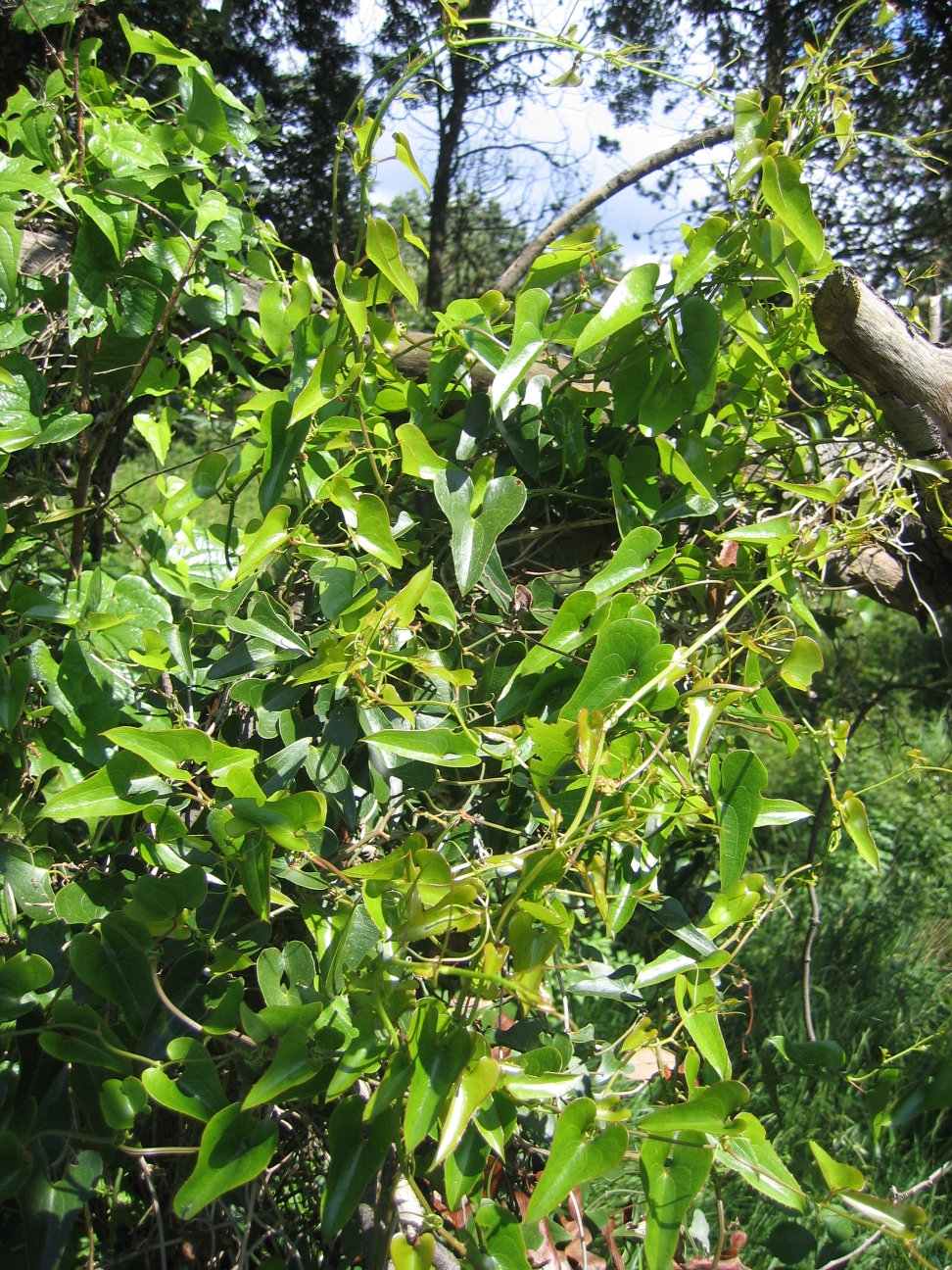
Thickets of Smilax aspera

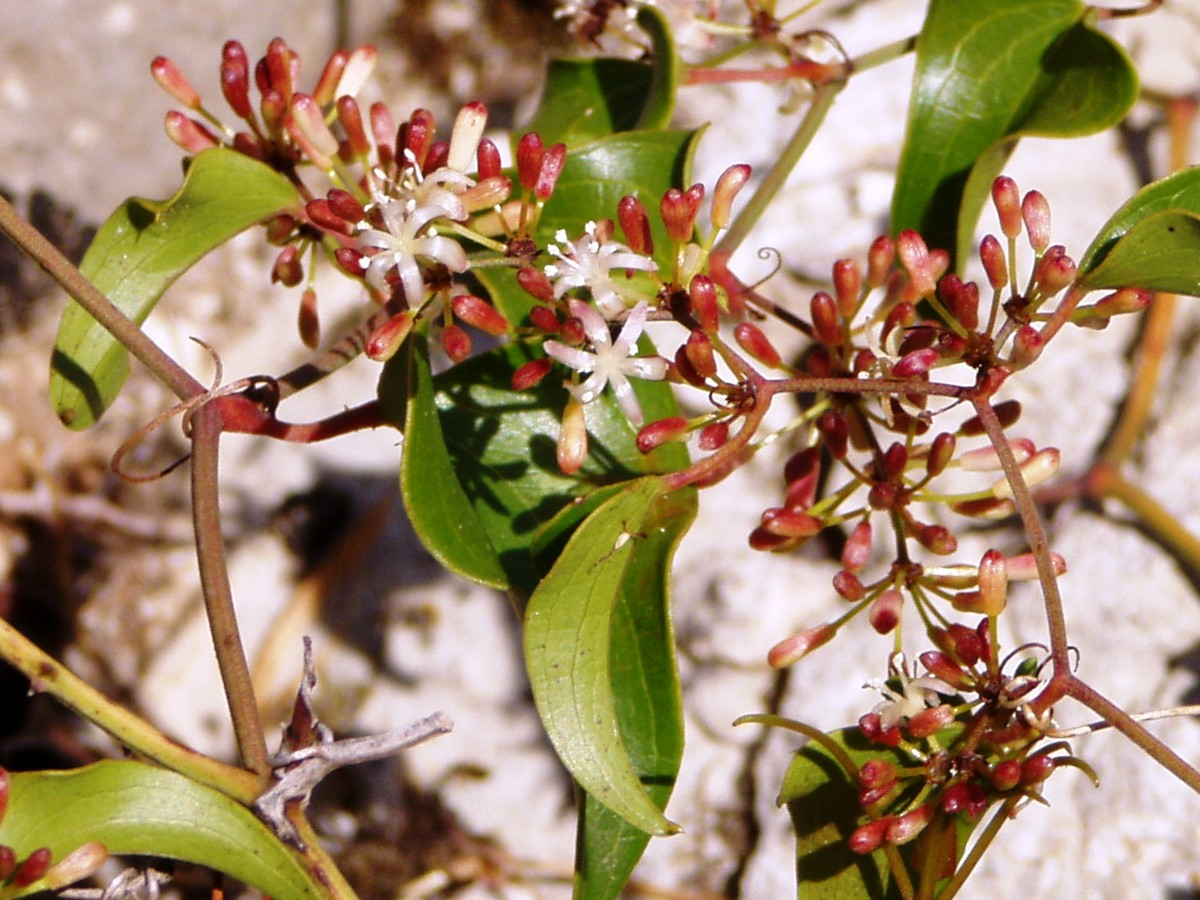
Smilax aspera in bloom

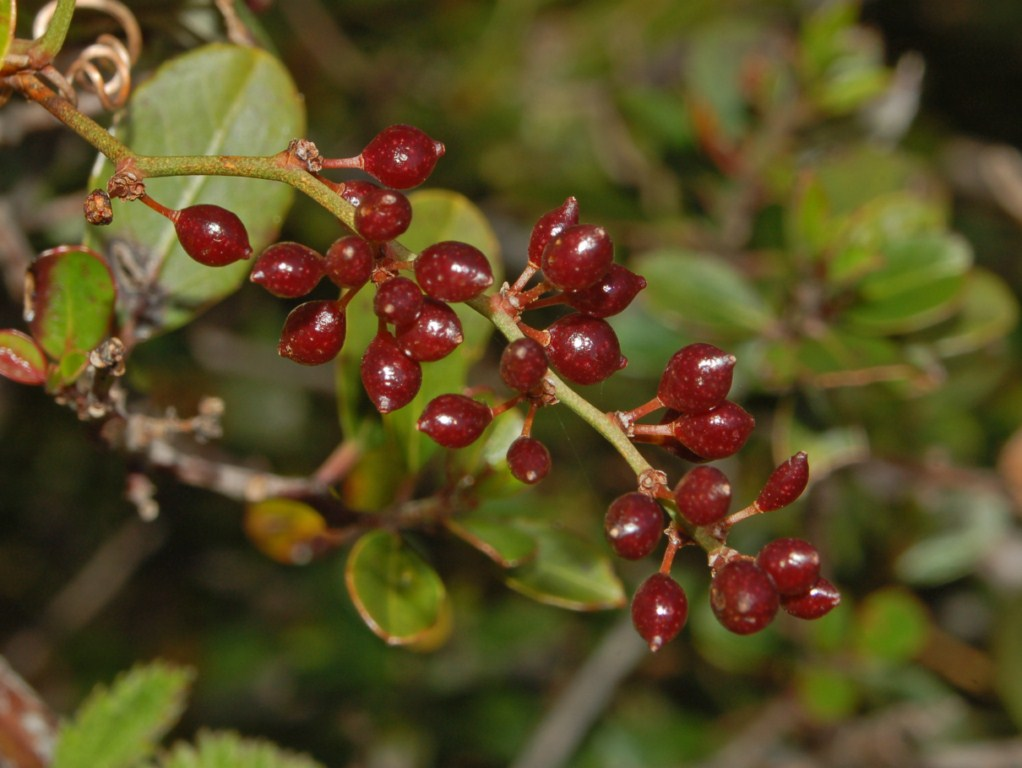
Berries of Smilax aspera

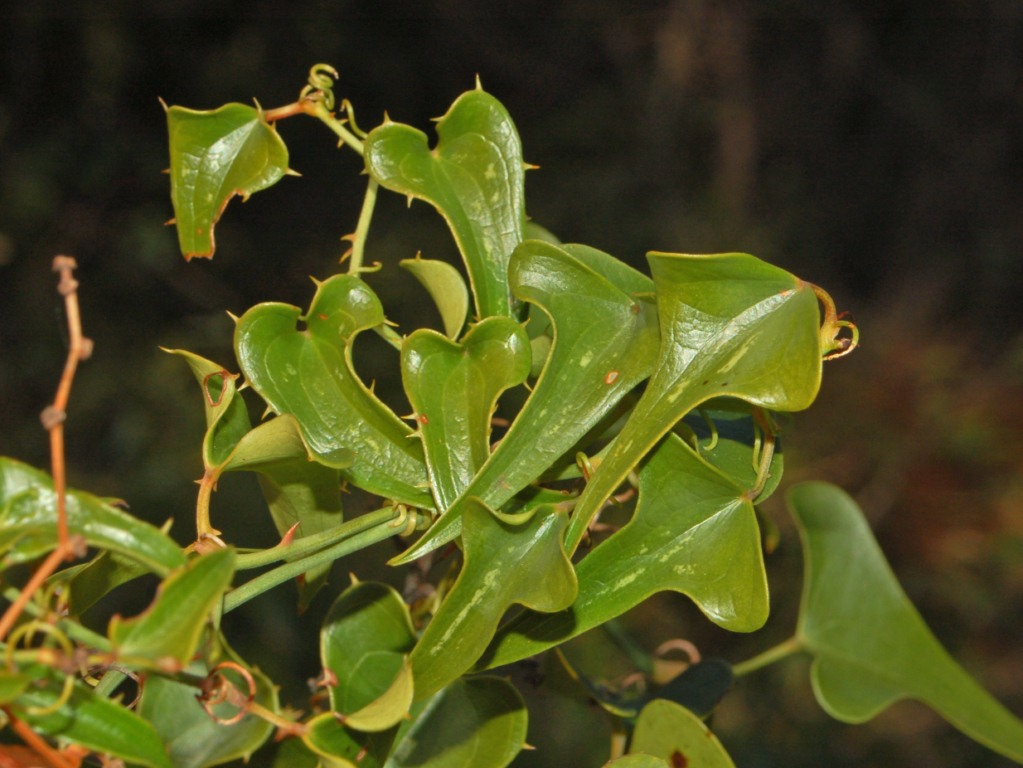
Leaves of Smilax aspera

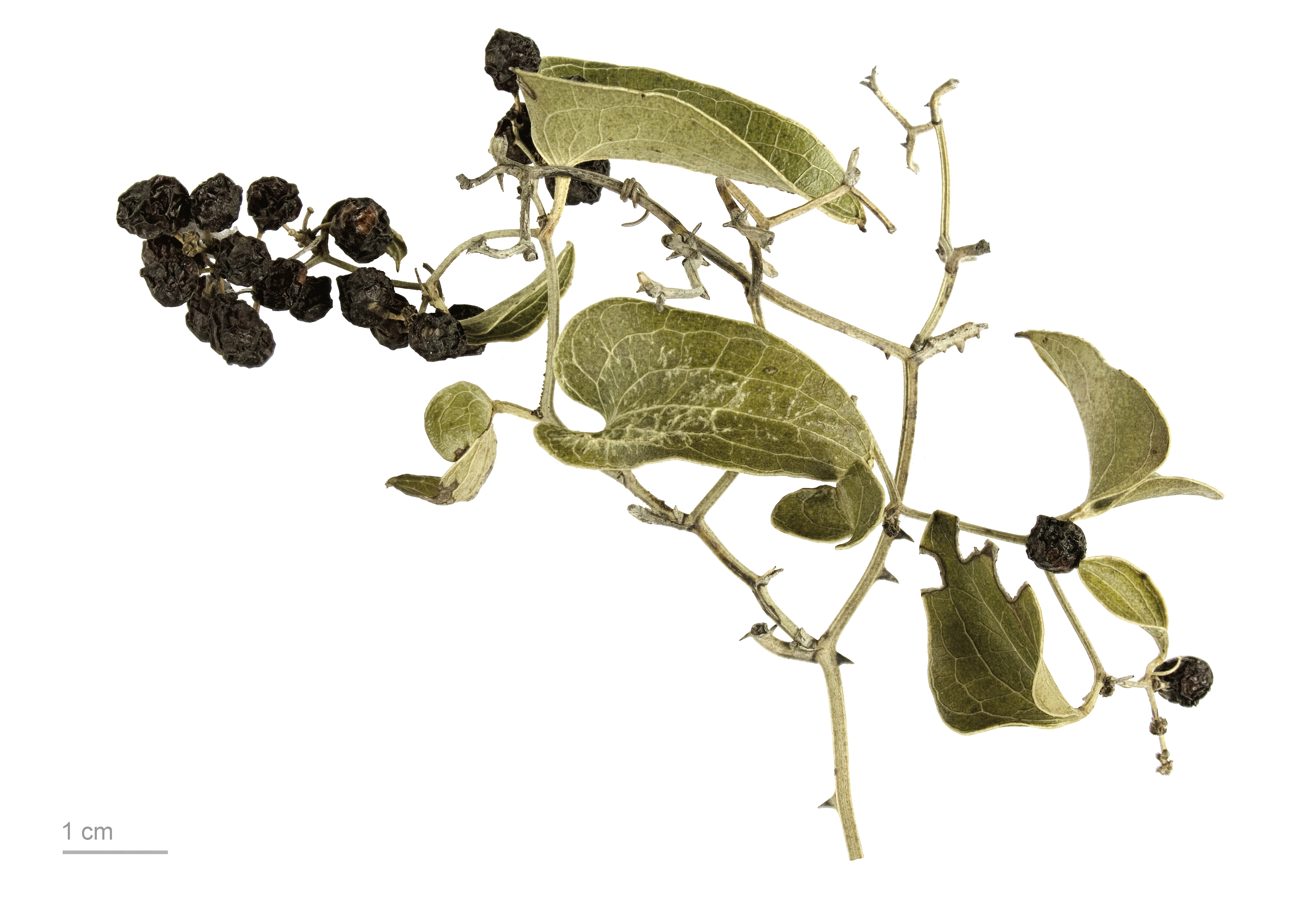
Smilax aspera - MHNT

== See also ==
- Smilax glyciphylla (sweet sarsaparille)
