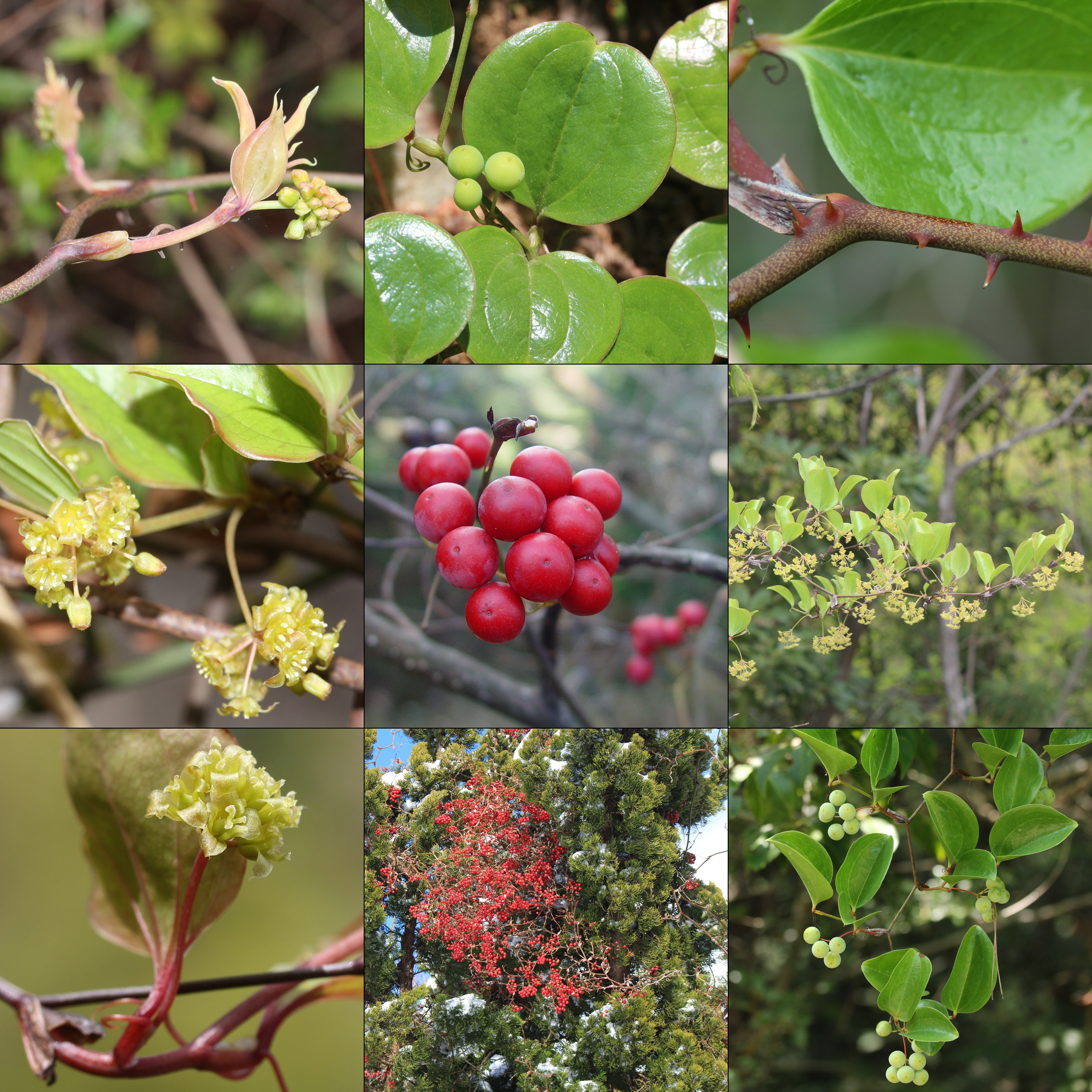
- Fruits

Scientific classification
- Kingdom: Plantae
- Clade: Embryophytes
- Clade: Tracheophytes
- Clade: Spermatophytes
- Clade: Angiosperms
- Clade: Monocots
- Order: Liliales
- Family: Smilacaceae
- Genus: Smilax
- Species: S. china

Binomial name
- Smilax china L.

Synonyms*
- Coprosmanthus japonicus Kunth; Smilax japonica (Kunth) A.Gray; Smilax pteropus Miq.; Smilax thomsoniana A.DC.; Smilax taquetii H.Lév.; Smilax taiheiensis Hayata; Smilax boninensis Nakai

= Smilax china =

Species of flowering plant

Smilax china is a climbing plant species in the genus Smilax. It is native to China, Korea, Taiwan, Japan (including Ryukyu and Bonin Islands), Philippines, Vietnam, Thailand, Myanmar, and India. It is also known as china root, china-root, or chinaroot, as is the related Smilax glabra.

== Description ==
The stem is woody, sparsely prickly, and 1–5 m (3 ft 3 in – 16 ft 5 in) long. Petiole is 0.5–1.5 cm (0.20–0.59 in) long; leaf blade is elliptic to orbicular, 3–10 cm (1.2–3.9 in) long and 1.5–6 cm (0.59–2.36 in) wide, sometimes wider. Berries are red, globose, and 0.6–1.5 cm (0.24–0.59 in) in diameter.

Kaempferol 7-O-glucoside, a flavonol glucoside, can be found in S. china.

== Habitat ==
In China, S. china occurs in forests, thickets, hillsides, grassy slopes, and shaded places along valleys or streams. It is found from near sea level to 2,000 m (6,600 ft).

== Human use ==
In Korea, its leaves and roots are used as herbs.
