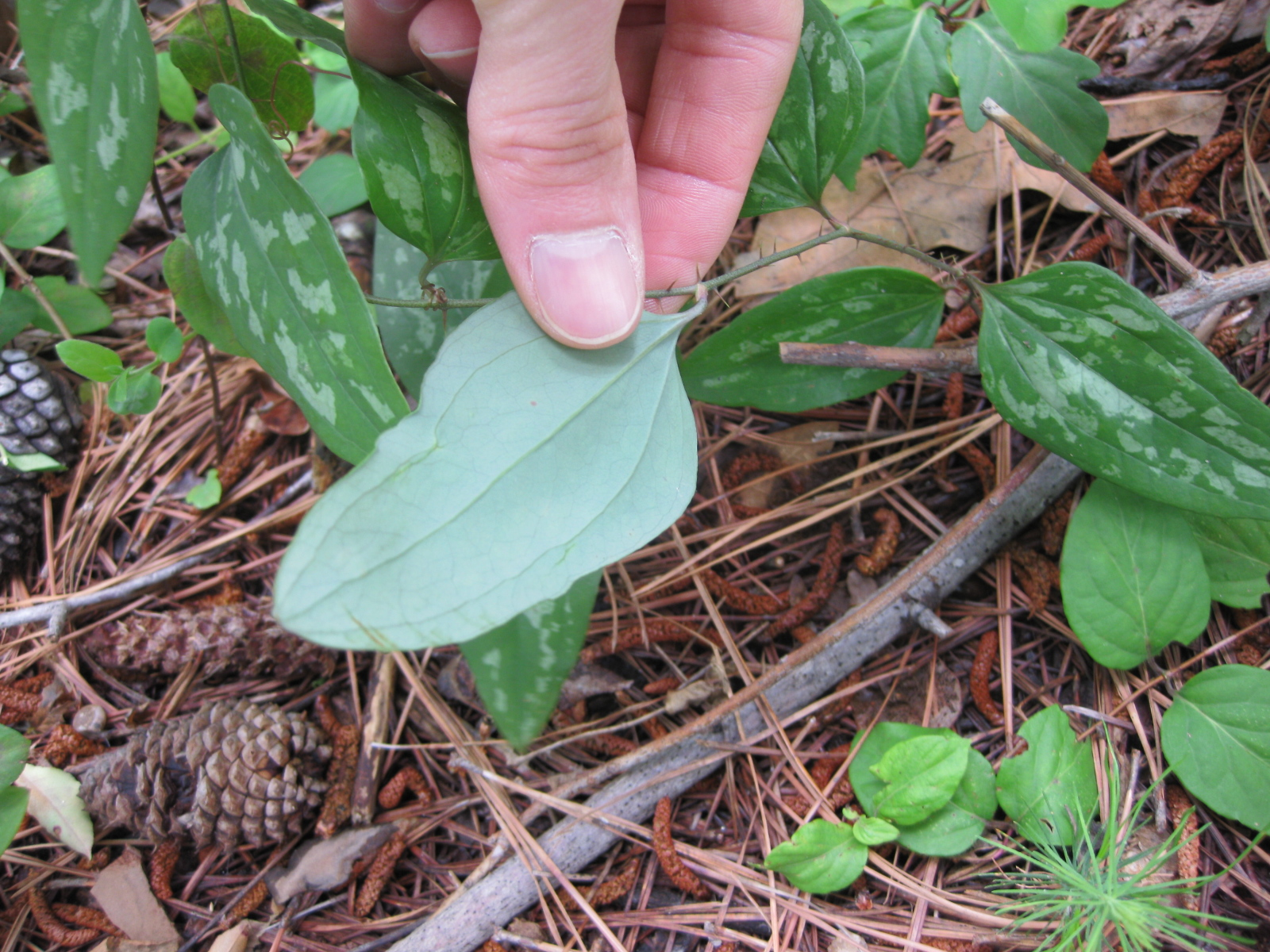

Conservation status
- Secure (NatureServe)

Scientific classification
- Kingdom: Plantae
- Clade: Tracheophytes
- Clade: Angiosperms
- Clade: Monocots
- Order: Liliales
- Family: Smilacaceae
- Genus: Smilax
- Species: S. glauca

Binomial name
- Smilax glauca Walter 1788 not Mart. 1823

Synonyms
- Smilax sarsaparilla L.; Smilax spinulosa Sm.; Smilax discolor Schltdl.

= Smilax glauca =

Species of flowering plant

Smilax glauca, the cat greenbriar or catbriar, is a woody vine in the family Smilacaceae. It is native to central and eastern portions of the United States as well as Mexico, where it is a common and conspicuous part of the forest vegetation.

Smilax glauca has prickly stems and climbs by means of tendrils. Leaves are notably gray-glaucous to whitish beneath. It commonly inhabits wooded areas and fences and is often found growing with other species of Smilax. The plants tend to be evergreen in the more southern United States.

== Description ==
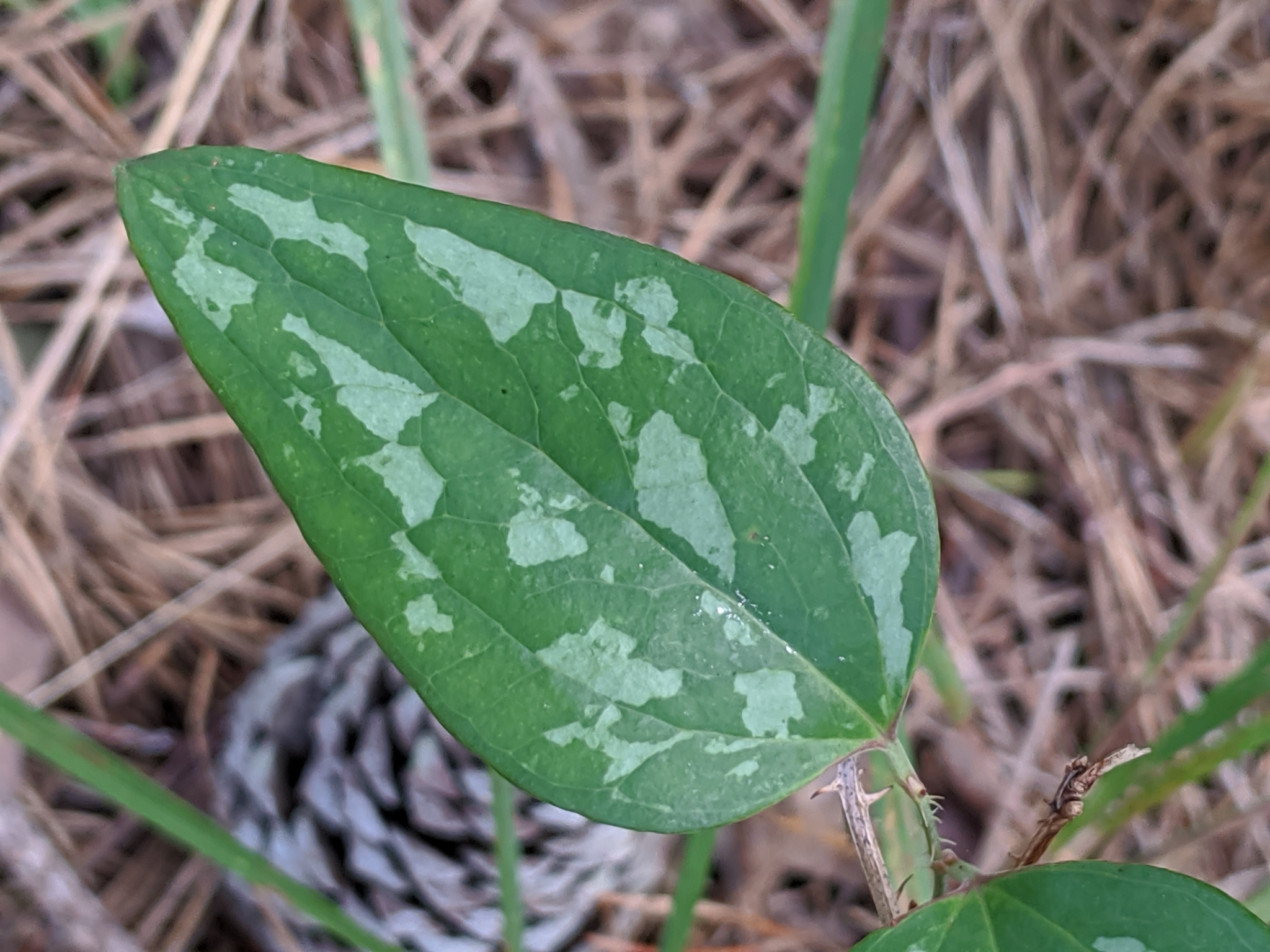
Smilax glauca leaf

Smilax glauca is a woody vine that succeeds in most soils in sun and in semi-shaded areas. It can grow over trees, shrubs, or stumps. It is a dioecious plant, as well as an evergreen climber that can grow to 5 meters, it flowers in June and is leafy all year. The flowers have six tepals and stamens and the ovule bearing flowers have one superior ovary. This species can survive in sandy, loamy, and clay soils. Smilax glauca produces berries, generally in the winter. The leaves of the species are simple; there is a single leaf per node that dies in the winter. This plant has fleshy berries. Smilax glauca is a monocot liana.

== Taxonomy ==
Smilax glauca is a monocot in the family Smilacaceae. The family comprises herbaceous vines and woody lianas typically with prickles and tendrils. Smilax glauca has the common name of cat greenbrier. Some authors recognize two varieties of the species (var. leurophylla and var. genuina) though Flora of Virginia only recognizes one.

== Distribution and habitat ==
Smilax glauca occurs in disturbed habitats such as forest edges and grasslands. The plant is native to much of the Atlantic coast of the US. Smilax glauca also occurs in wetlands, and can be found in the southeastern US. Smilax glauca is also found in the Ocala National Forest in Florida.

== Fire ecology ==
Smilax glauca is resistant to fire because it sprouts from rhizomes. Therefore, canopy openings that are caused by fire favor S. glauca. The immediate effect of fire on Smilax glauca is being top-killed with subsequent resprouting. Smilax glauca increases in importance after fire in upland southern pine forests.

== Ethnobotany ==
There are a few medicinal uses for Smilax glauca. The stem prickles have been rubbed on the skin to act as a counterirritant to relieve pain and muscle cramps. The stems and leaves have also been used to make a tea that relieves stomach issues. Smilax glauca root can be boiled and made into a jelly-like food; the root can also be dried and made into a powder.
