= Solidago verna =

Conservation status
- Vulnerable (NatureServe)

Scientific classification
- Kingdom: Plantae
- Clade: Tracheophytes
- Clade: Angiosperms
- Clade: Eudicots
- Clade: Asterids
- Order: Asterales
- Family: Asteraceae
- Genus: Solidago
- Species: S. verna

Binomial name
- Solidago verna M.A.Curtis ex Torr. & A.Gray

Synonyms
- Aster vernus (M.A.Curtis ex Torr. & A.Gray) Kuntze 1891 not L. 1753

Species of aster

Solidago verna is a species of flowering plant in the aster family known by the common names springflowering goldenrod and spring goldenrod. It is native to North Carolina and South Carolina in the United States.

Solidago verna is a perennial herb growing up to about 1.2 meters (4 feet) in height. It produces a single hairy, erect stem from a woody, branching caudex. The serrated leaves are up to 16 centimeters (6.4 inches) long and are borne on winged petioles. The inflorescence contains many bell-shaped flower heads. Each flower head contains 7-12 yellow ray florets surrounding 14-27 yellow disc florets. This species is the only goldenrod in the region that blooms in spring.

Solidago verna occurs in several types of habitat, including sandhills, pine barrens, and pocosins. The three main habitat types are pocosin ecotones, the river terraces along the Little River, and wet pine flatwoods.

Threats to the species include the loss of habitat to development and agriculture, including silviculture. Fire suppression may degrade the habitat as well.
