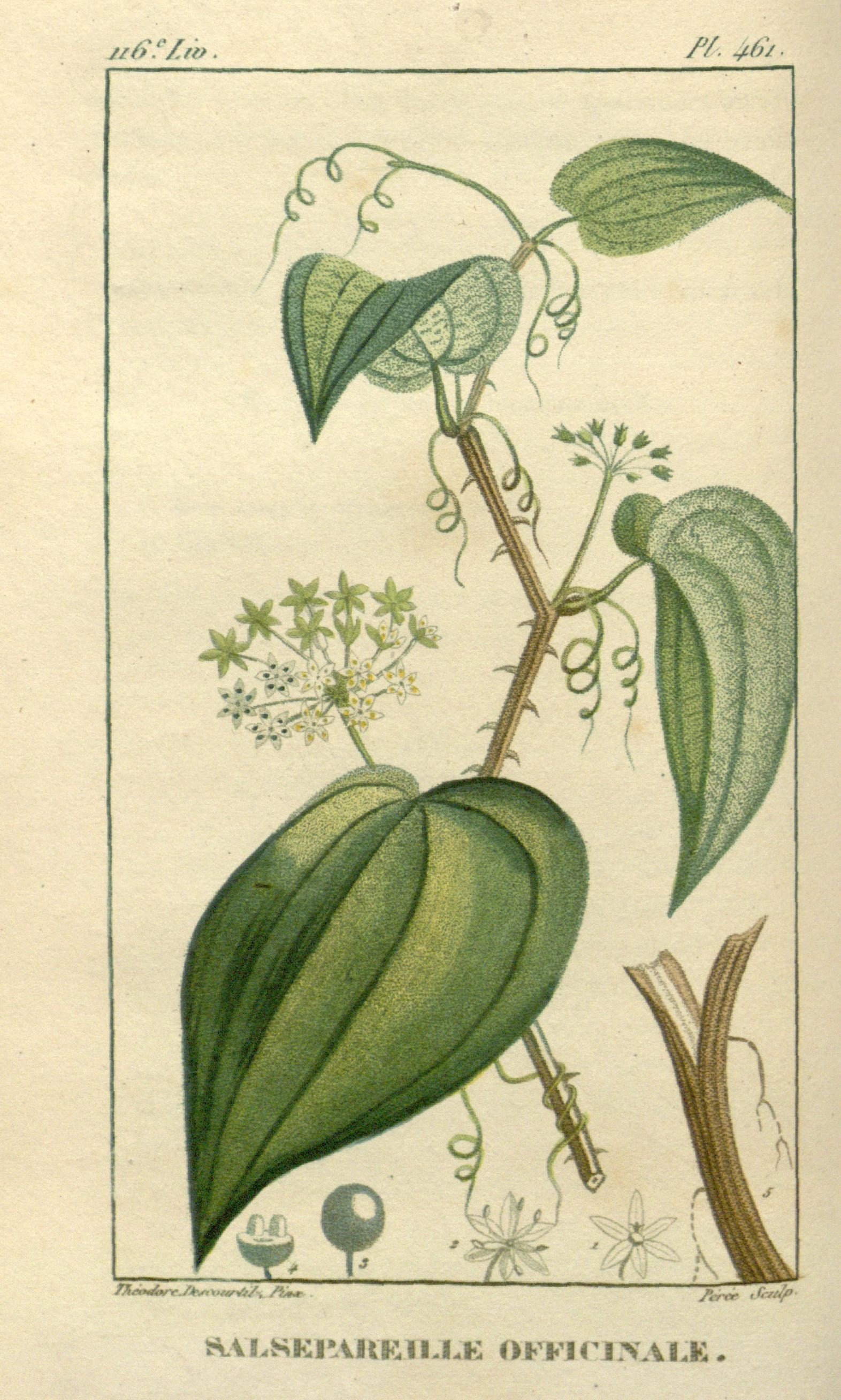
- Botanical illustration
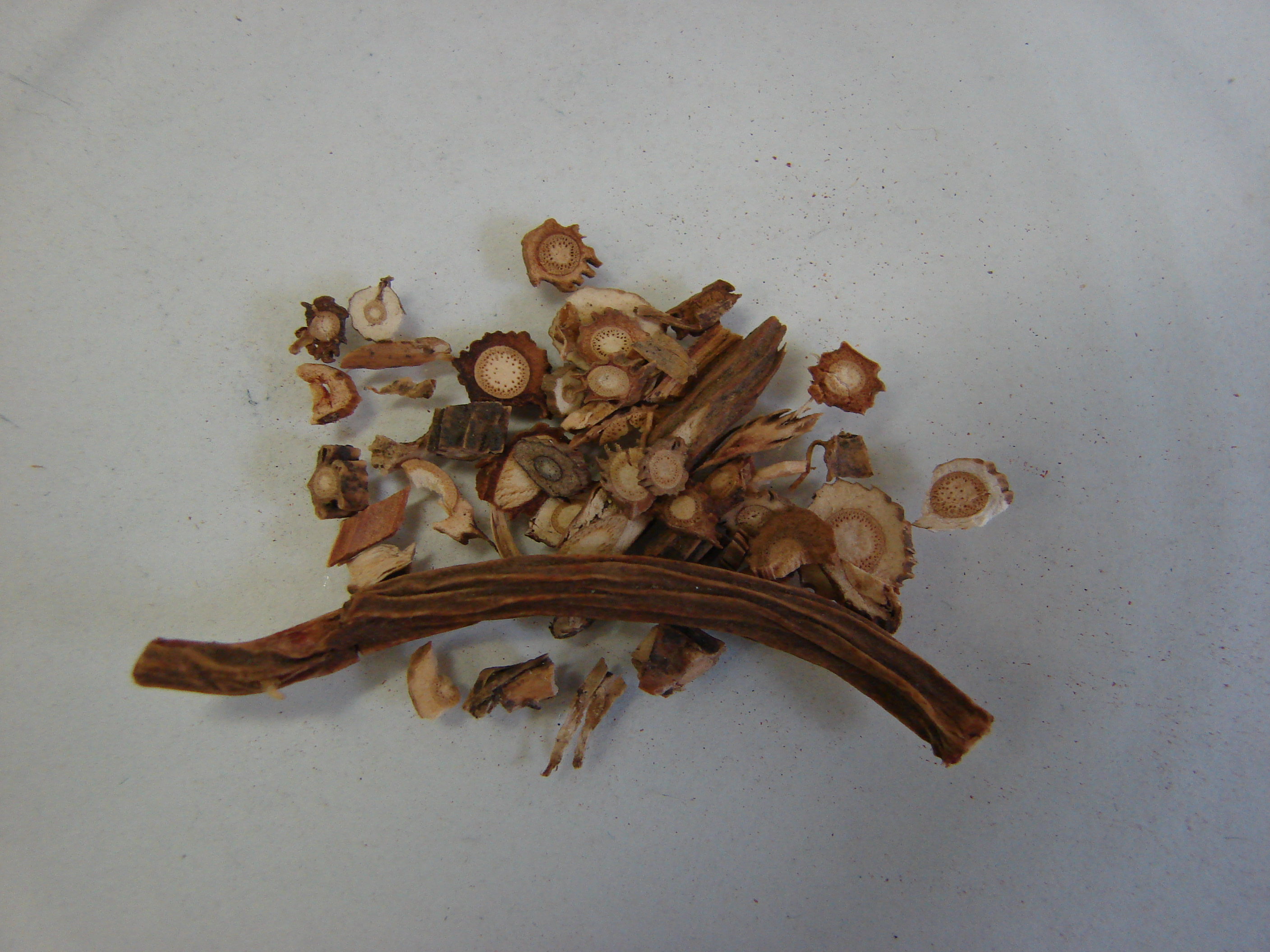
- Sarsaparillae radix

Scientific classification
- Kingdom: Plantae
- Clade: Embryophytes
- Clade: Tracheophytes
- Clade: Angiosperms
- Clade: Monocots
- Order: Liliales
- Family: Smilacaceae
- Genus: Smilax
- Species: S. officinalis

Binomial name
- Smilax officinalis Kunth

Synonyms
- List: Smilax barbillana Cufod.; Smilax bernhardii F.W.Apt; Smilax chiriquensis C.V.Morton; Smilax gilgiana F.W.Apt; Smilax standleyi Killip & C.V.Morton; Smilax tonduzii F.W.Apt; Smilax vanilliodora F.W.Apt

= Smilax officinalis =

Species of flowering plant

Smilax officinalis is a species of flowering plant in the family Smilacaceae, native to southern Central America and northwest South America; Honduras, Nicaragua, Costa Rica, Panama, Colombia, and Ecuador. A vine reaching 50 m (160 ft) as it climbs trees into the canopy, its roots are collected and used to make traditional medicines and, like other Smilax species, the soft drink sarsaparilla.
