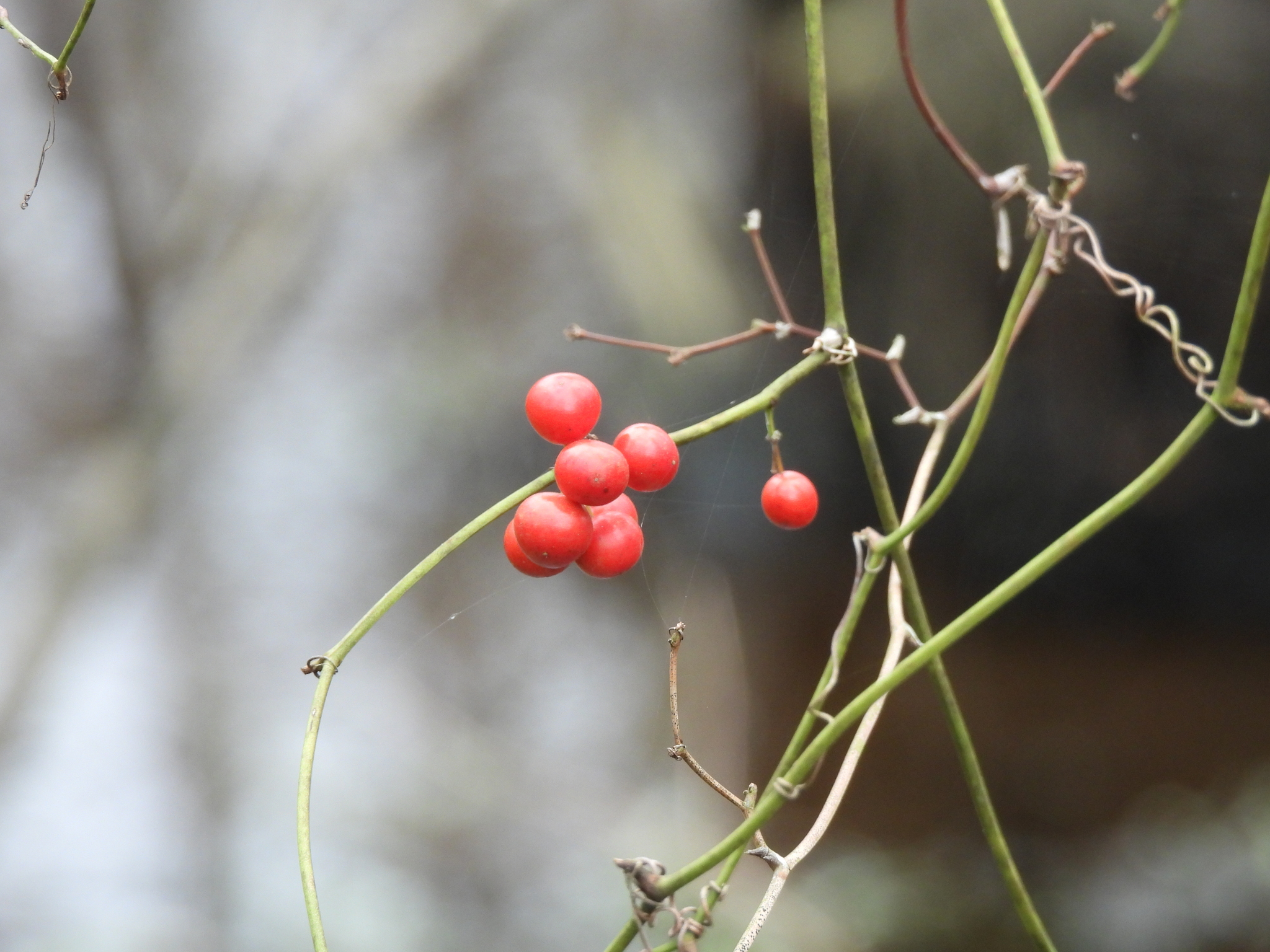

Scientific classification
- Kingdom: Plantae
- Clade: Embryophytes
- Clade: Tracheophytes
- Clade: Angiosperms
- Clade: Monocots
- Order: Liliales
- Family: Smilacaceae
- Genus: Smilax
- Species: S. walteri

Binomial name
- Smilax walteri Pursh

Synonyms
- Smilax china Walter 1788, illegitimate homonym not L. 1753; Smilax walteri f. pallida Hollick

= Smilax walteri =

Species of flowering plant

Smilax walteri, common names coral greenbrier, red-berried greenbrier, or red-berried bamboo, is a North American species of plant found only in the United States. It is native to coastal plains in the south-central, southeastern, and east-central parts of the country, from eastern Texas to New Jersey.

Smilax walteri is a vine climbing over other vegetation, sometimes reaching up to 6 m (20 feet) above the ground. Flowers are small and yellow-brown, hence not very showy, but the bright orange or red berries are conspicuous especially in the winter.
