= Jade and Sarsaparilla =

American musical act

- LP back cover

Background information
- Origin: Cape Cod, Massachusetts, U.S.
- Genres: Folk rock
- Years active: 1970s
- Label: Submaureen Records
- Past members: Janet Hood; Linda Langford

Jade and Sarsaparilla were an American musical act of the 1970s.

== History ==
American musicians Janet Hood and Linda Langford, both from Cape Cod, Massachusetts, formed Jade and Sarsaparilla in 1973. Their repertoire featured many original compositions, ranging "from passionate singer-songwriter ballads to funky pop to jazzy cabaret, with songs of love and sexuality addressed sensitively, [and] directly."

Their first and only album, titled Jade and Sarsaparilla, (Note: Featured musicians were Linda Langford: vocals; Janet Hood: piano, vocals; Gene Roma: drums, congas; Richard Appleman: electric bass, double bass; and Bob Gullotti: drums. In the production team were Bob Stoughton: engineer; Maureen Boyce: executive producer; and Steve Tarshis: producer) released in 1976 on Submaureen Records, out of Hyannis Port, is now considered a rarity. Songs include "She's That Kind of Woman"; "Gimme a Pigfoot"; "Daytime"; "Talkin'"; "I Can't Say, I Can't Go"; "It's Gonna Take a Miracle; "I Need a Drink of Water in My Mind"; and "I'd Like to Be." In Christgau's Record Guide: Rock Albums of the Seventies (1981), critic Robert Christgau wrote that "the built-in societal conflict faced by two women who sing love songs to each other not only makes the melodrama more credible...but is also interesting in itself."

In the late 80s, Janet Hood developed the song cycle Elegies for Angels, Punks and Raging Queens, inspired by the NAMES Project AIDS Memorial Quilt and Edgar Lee Masters' Spoon River Anthology, with lyrics and additional text by Bill Russell. It was produced on stage in New York, London, and other places around the world.

== See also ==
- Joy of Cooking
- Tom Robinson Band
