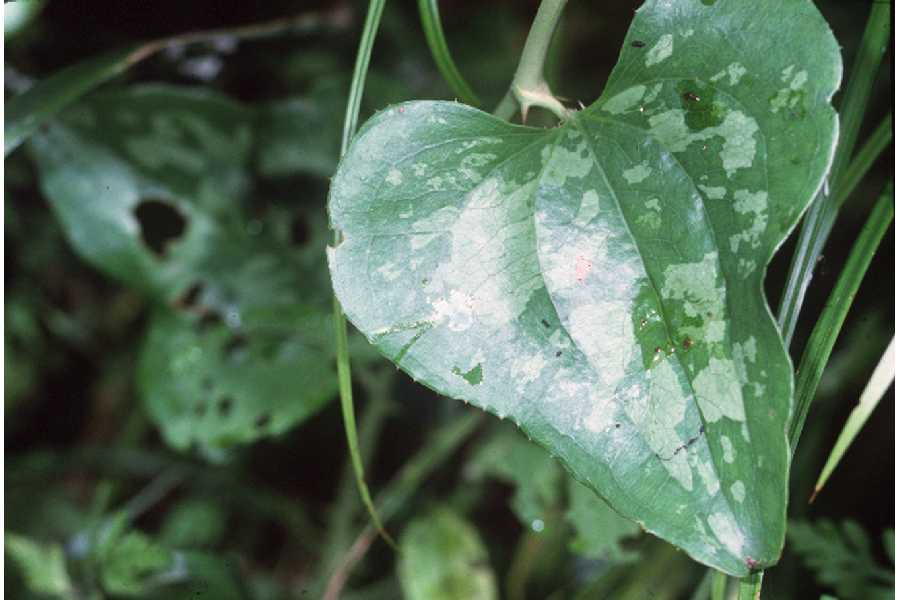

Conservation status
- Secure (NatureServe)

Scientific classification
- Kingdom: Plantae
- Clade: Tracheophytes
- Clade: Angiosperms
- Clade: Monocots
- Order: Liliales
- Family: Smilacaceae
- Genus: Smilax
- Species: S. bona-nox

Binomial name
- Smilax bona-nox L.

Synonyms
- Synonymy: Smilax variegata Walter; Smilax bermudensis Duhamel; Smilax hastata Willd. 1806, not Jacq. 1760; Smilax asperovariabilis Pers; Smilax pandurata Pursh; Smilax alpini Willd.; Smilax pubens Willd.; Smilax horrida Poir.; Smilax rubens P.Watson; Smilax pseudosarsa Vis.; Smilax lomoplis Raf.; Smilax medica M.Martens & Galeotti 1842, not Schltdl. & Cham. 1831; Smilax platycentron Schltdl.; Smilax hederifolia Beyr. ex Kunth; Smilax senticosa Kunth; Smilax renifolia Small; Smilax cantab Lynch

= Smilax bona-nox =

Species of flowering plant

Smilax bona-nox, the saw greenbrier, is a species of plant in the family Smilacaceae. It is native to the Southern United States, and eastern Mexico.

== Description ==
Smilax bona-nox, also known as saw greenbrier, is a flowering vine that is prickly with a one-seeded fruit. This plant prefers full sun but can also survive in partial shade. It prefers moist soil but is tolerant of numerous soil types. They are commonly found in wooded disturbed areas. Smilax bona-nox is dioecious, meaning it is either male or female.

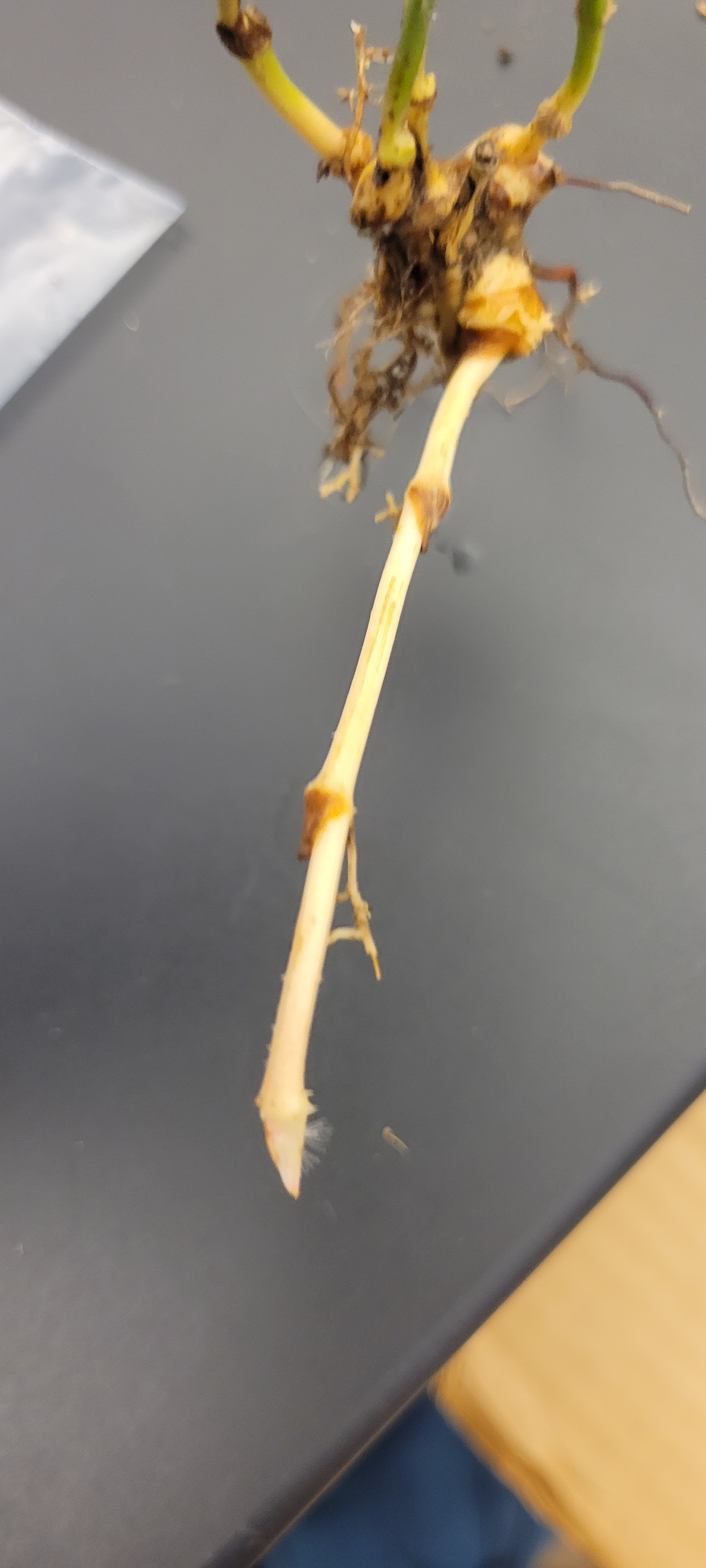
The rhizome of the Smilax bona-nox.

Smilax bona-nox produces fruits, one seeded drupes, that are dispersed by animals. Fruits are black and blue in color. The fruits are edible to humans and wildlife. Fruit harvest is during the fall and summer months.

Bullbriar, Catbriar, Dunes Saw Greenbrier, Greenbriar, Streychberry Vine, and Tramp's Trouble are common names for Smilax bona-nox.

== Distribution and habitat ==
Smilax bona-nox ranges across much of the eastern part of the U.S. It is distributed as far south as southern Florida, west to the edge of Texas and eastern Mexico, north to Maryland, Kentucky and southern parts of Indiana and Illinois, Missouri and Southeastern Kansas. Smilax bona-nox also occurs in Bermuda and Mexico.

S. bona-nox has been observed in habitats such as dunes, maritime forests, wetlands, and uplands environments. This species may occur in fine, medium, or coarse soils. It has a high shade tolerance and a medium drought tolerance.

Smilax bona-nox is dispersed by its berries being eaten and defecated by wildlife. Mainly small animals and songbirds partake of the fruits but they are also eaten by deer and black bears.

== Cultivation ==
Smilax bona-nox is easy to grow by seed, and should be grown near lattice work or near something it can climb. This is a climbing plant that needs something to hold on to. It should also be given plenty of room as it will grow quickly and will shade other plants.

== Ethnobotany ==
Smilax bona-nox has many uses. The leaves of this plant were used for cigarette wrappers by the Native Americans. The roots can be used not only to make bread but also as medicines. The roots of this plant are known to help urinary tract infections and as an antioxidant.

== Edibility ==
Smilax bona-nox is edible whether cooked or not. If cooked, the roots can be made into a gelatin replacement if ground into a powder. Younger shoots are edible raw or cooked. The fruits are also edible; they are black and blue.

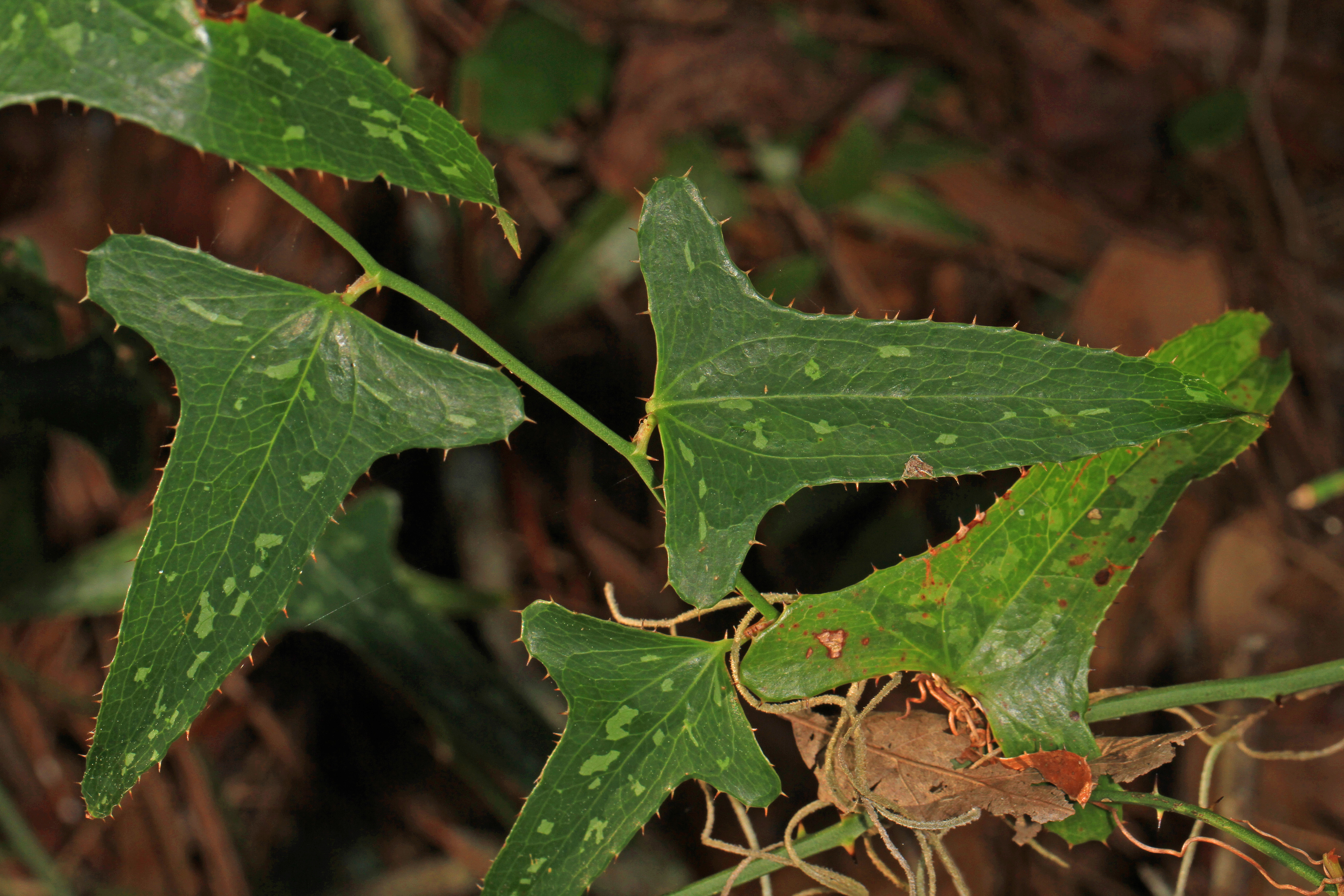

== Control ==
Smilax bona-nox can be controlled with herbicides but has been known to adapt to the effects of it. It has also been known to not be affected at all. Some herbicides have been known to also help it grow instead of causing it to die. Smilax bona-nox can also be controlled by fire but it returns due to respiration.

== Wildlife ==
Many animals use the fruit of Smilax bona-nox as food, including wood ducks, ruffed grouse, wild turkey, fish crows, black bears, opossums, raccoons, squirrels, and multiple species of songbirds. Both the leaves and fruit are occasionally eaten by white-tailed deer.

The leaves and growth of the plant are used for shelter for smaller mammals. It is used to help smaller mammals to hide from both larger mammals and predator birds. The prickles on the plant are for protection from larger herbivores.

== Fire ecology ==
The Smilax bona-nox is tolerant to the occasional control burns and natural fires. Because they have rhizomes under ground, they can still sprout even when they have lost the tops of their plants. Corm-like forms can grow along with their rhizomes.
