= Baba Roots =

Baba Roots is a herbal drink popular among young people in Jamaica. The drink was founded by entrepreneur William Webb. The manufacturer sponsors events featuring dancehall music, and several deejays have promoted the drink. It is popularly believed in Jamaica that herbal drinks like Baba Roots promote good health and stimulate sexual performance, although the effects of the ingredients have not been fully studied.

== See also ==
- Roots wine
