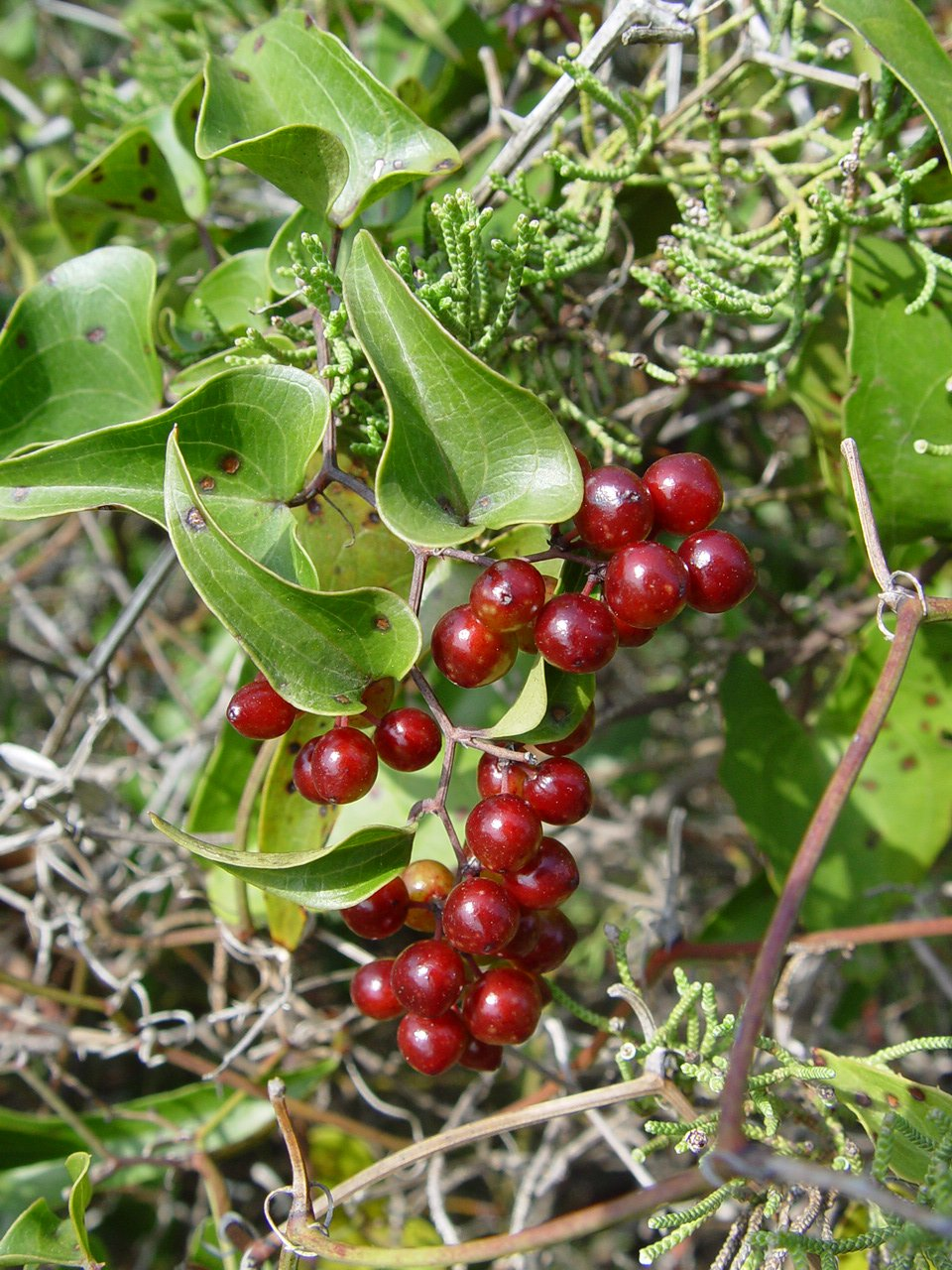
- Mediterranean smilax (S. aspera) in fruit

Scientific classification
- Kingdom: Plantae
- Clade: Embryophytes
- Clade: Tracheophytes
- Clade: Angiosperms
- Clade: Monocots
- Order: Liliales
- Family: Smilacaceae
- Genus: Smilax; L.

Type species
- Smilax aspera L.

Species
- About 300–350 (see list)

Synonyms
- Nemexia Raf.; Parillax Raf.; Aniketon Raf.; Dilax Raf.; Coprosmanthus Kunth; Pleiosmilax Seem.; Sarsaparilla Kuntze

= Smilax =

Genus of flowering plants

Smilax is a genus of about 300–350 species, found in the tropics and subtropics worldwide. They are climbing flowering plants, many of which are woody and/or thorny, in the monocotyledon family Smilacaceae, native throughout the tropical and subtropical regions of the world. Common names include catbriers, greenbriers, prickly-ivys and smilaxes. Sarsaparilla (also zarzaparrilla, sarsparilla) is a name used specifically for the Neotropical S. ornata as well as a catch-all term in particular for American species. Occasionally, the non-woody species such as the smooth herbaceous greenbrier (S. herbacea) are separated as genus Nemexia; they are commonly known by the rather ambiguous name carrion flowers.

Greenbriers get their scientific name from the Greek myth of Crocus and the nymph Smilax. Though this myth has numerous forms, it always centers around the unfulfilled and tragic love of a mortal man who is turned into a flower, and a woodland nymph who is transformed into a brambly vine.

== Description ==
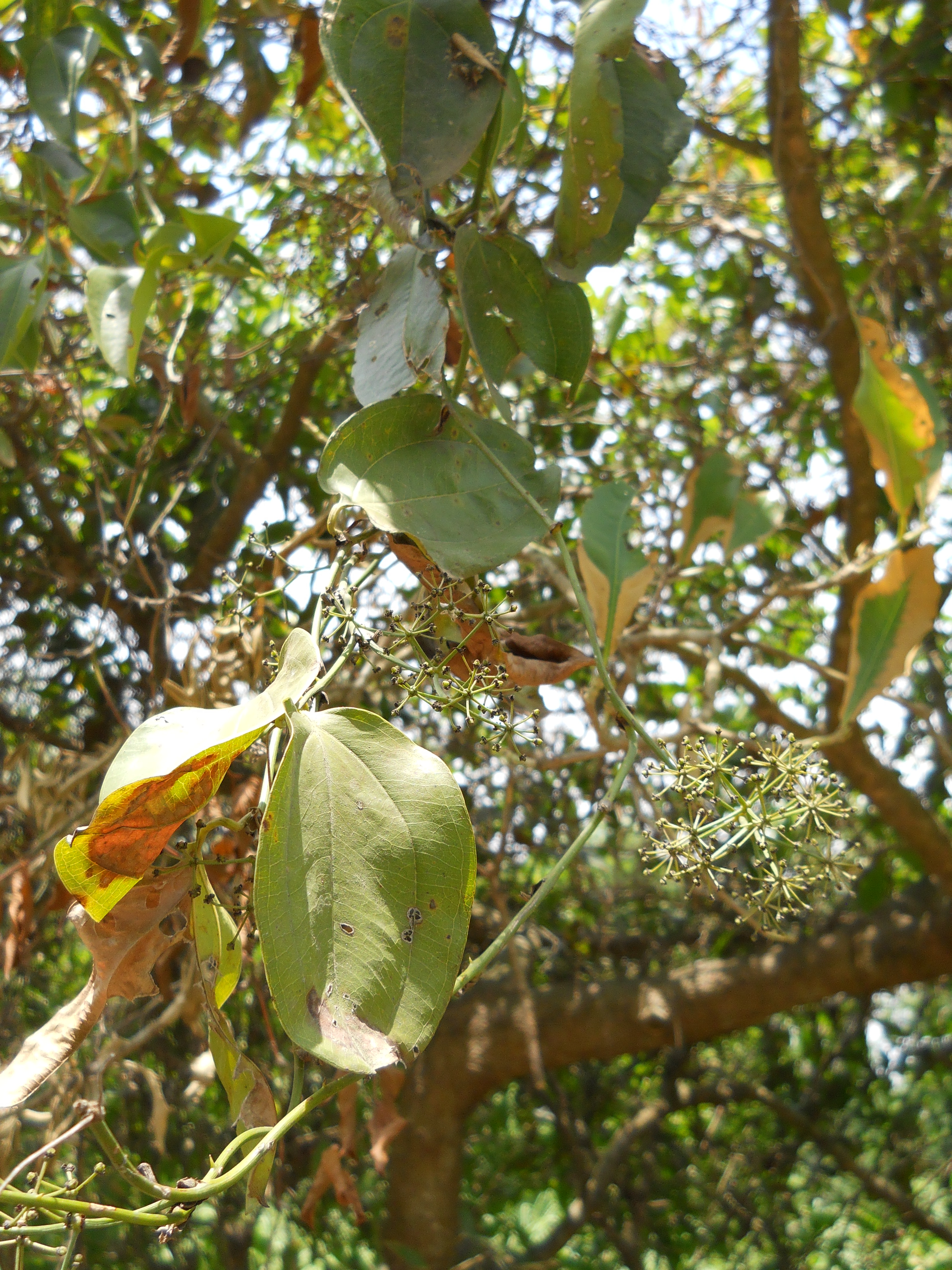
Smilax sp. climber at Howrah district, West Bengal, India

On their own, Smilax plants will grow as shrubs, forming dense impenetrable thickets. They will also grow over trees and other plants up to 10 m high, their hooked thorns allowing them to hang onto and scramble over branches. The genus includes both deciduous and evergreen species. The leaves are heart shaped and vary from 4–30 cm long in different species.

Greenbrier is dioecious. However, only about one in three colonies have plants of both sexes. Plants flower in May and June with white–green clustered flowers. If pollination occurs, the plant will produce a bright red to blue-black spherical berry fruit about 5–10 mm in diameter that matures in the fall (autumn).

Extrafloral nectaries have been reported on the apex and lower side of the leaf of S. bracteata.

== Taxonomy ==
The genus has traditionally been considered as divided into a number of sections, but molecular phylogenetic studies reveals that these morphologically defined subdivisions are not monophyletic. Subdivision is best considered in terms of clades (A–D), corresponding to biogeography, with the main divisions being Old World (clades C, D) and New World (clade B) with the exception of S. aspera, that appears to be sister to all other species (clade A) and has a tri-continental disjunction.

Section Smilax includes "woody", (Note: Being a monocot, members of the family Smilacacea can not lay down true wood.) prickly vines of temperate North America, for example cat greenbrier (S. glauca) and common greenbrier (S. rotundifolia). Section Nemexia includes unarmed herbaceous plants of temperate North America, for example "carrion flowers" like the smooth herbaceous greenbrier (S. herbacea). Section Heterosmilax represents a previous separate genus that was found to be embedded within Smilax, and was reduced to a section within it.

=== List of selected species ===
- Smilax aberrans Gagnep.
- Smilax aculeatissima Conran
- Smilax amblyobasis K.Krause
- Smilax ampla Warb. ex K.Krause
- Smilax anceps Willd.
- Smilax anguina K.Krause
- Smilax annulata Warb. ex K.Krause
- Smilax aquifolium Ferrufino & Greuter
- Smilax arisanensis Hayata
- Smilax aristolochiifolia Mill. – American sarsaparilla
- Smilax aspera L. – Mediterranean smilax, common smilax, rough smilax
- Smilax aspericaulisWall. ex A.DC.
- Smilax assumptionis A.DC.
- Smilax astrosperma F.T.Wang & Tang
- Smilax auriculata Walter
- Smilax australis R.Br. – lawyer vine, barbwire vine, wait-a-while (Australia)
- Smilax azorica H.Schaef. & P.Schönfelder
- Smilax bapouensis H.Li
- Smilax basilata F.T.Wang & Tang
- Smilax bauhinioides Kunth
- Smilax bella J.F.Macbr.
- Smilax biflora Siebold ex Miq.
- Smilax biltmoreana (Small) J.B.Norton ex Pennell
- Smilax biumbellata T.Koyama
- Smilax blumei A.DC.
- Smilax bockii Warb.
- Smilax bona-nox L. – saw greenbrier
- Smilax borneensis A.DC.
- Smilax bracteata Presl
- Smilax brasiliensis Sprengel.
- Smilax californica (A.DC.) A.Gray
- Smilax calophylla Wall. ex A.DC.
- Smilax cambodiana Gagnep.
- Smilax campestris Griseb.
- Smilax canariensis Willd.
- Smilax canellifolia Mill.
- Smilax celebica Blume
- Smilax chapaensis Gagnep.
- Smilax china L.
- Smilax chingii F.T. Wang & Ts.Tang
- Smilax cinnamomea Desf. ex A.DC.
- Smilax cissoides M.Martens & Galeotti
- Smilax cocculoides Warb.
- Smilax cognata Kunth
- Smilax compta (Killip & C.V.Morton) Ferrufino
- Smilax corbularia Kunth
- Smilax cordato-ovata Rich.
- Smilax cordifolia Humb. & Bonpl. ex Willd.
- Smilax coriacea Spreng.
- Smilax cristalensis Ferrufino & Greuter
- Smilax cuprea Ferrufino & Greuter
- Smilax cuspidata Duhamel
- Smilax cyclophylla Warb.
- Smilax darrisii H.Lév.
- Smilax davidiana A.DC.
- Smilax densibarbata F.T.Wang & Tang
- Smilax discotis Warb.
- Smilax domingensis Willd.
- Smilax ecirrhata (Engelm. ex Kunth) S.Wats.
- Smilax elastica Griseb.
- Smilax elegans Wall.
- Smilax elegantissima Gagnep.
- Smilax elmeri Merr.
- Smilax elongatoumbellata Hayata
- Smilax emeiensis J.M.Xu
- Smilax erecta Merr.
- Smilax excelsa L.
- Smilax extensa A.DC.
- Smilax ferox Wall. ex Kunth
- Smilax flavicaulis Rusby
- Smilax fluminensis Steud.
- Smilax fooningensis F.T.Wang & Tang
- Smilax gagnepainii T.Koyama
- Smilax gigantea Merr.
- Smilax gigantocarpa Koord.
- Smilax glabra Roxb. – chinaroot, tufuling (土茯苓)
- Smilax glauca Walter – cat greenbrier, glaucous greenbrier
- Smilax glaucochina Warb.
- Smilax glyciphylla Sm. – sweet sarsaparilla, native sarsaparilla (Australia)
- Smilax goyazana A.DC.
- Smilax gracilior Ferrufino & Greuter
- Smilax griffithii A.DC.
- Smilax guianensis Vitman
- Smilax guiyangensis C.X.Fu & C.D.Shen
- Smilax havanensis Jacq.
- Smilax hayatae T.Koyama
- Smilax hemsleyana Craib.
- Smilax herbacea L. – smooth herbaceous greenbrier, carrion flower (southern Quebec in Canada, Eastern United States)
- Smilax hilariana A.DC.
- Smilax horridiramula Hayata
- Smilax hugeri (Small) J.B.Norton ex Pennell
- Smilax hypoglauca Benth.
- Smilax ilicifolia Desv. ex Ham.
- Smilax illinoensis Mangaly – Illinois greenbrier
- Smilax indosinica T.Koyama
- Smilax inversa T.Koyama
- Smilax irrorata Mart. ex Griseb.
- Smilax jamesii G.Wallace
- Smilax japicanga Griseb.
- Smilax javensis A.DC.
- Smilax kaniensis K.Krause
- Smilax keyensis Warb. ex K.Krause
- Smilax kingii Hook.f.
- Smilax klotzschii Kunth
- Smilax korthalsii A.DC.
- Smilax kwangsiensis F.T.Wang & Tang
- Smilax lanceifolia Roxb.
- Smilax lappacea Humb. & Bonpl. ex Willd.
- Smilax larvata Griseb.
- Smilax lasioneura Hook. – herbaceous greenbrier
- Smilax lasseriana Steyerm.
- Smilax laurifolia L.
- Smilax lebrunii H.Lév.
- Smilax leucophylla Blume
- Smilax ligneoriparia C.X.Fu & P.Li
- Smilax ligustrifolia A.DC.
- Smilax loheri Merr
- Smilax longifolia Rich.
- Smilax lucidaMerr.
- Smilax luei T.Koyama
- Smilax lunglingensis F.T.Wang & Tang
- Smilax lushuiensis S.C.Chen
- Smilax lutescens Vell.
- Smilax luzonensis Presl
- Smilax macrocarpa Blume
- Smilax magnifolia J.F.Macbr.
- Smilax mairei Lev.
- Smilax malipoensis S.C.Chen
- Smilax maritima Feay ex Alph.Wood
- Smilax maypurensis Humb. & Bonpl. ex Willd.
- Smilax megacarpa A.DC.
- Smilax megalantha C.H.Wright
- Smilax melanocarpa Ridl.
- Smilax melastomifolia Sm. – hoi kuahiwi (Hawaiʻi)
- Smilax menispermoidea A.DC.
- Smilax microchina T.Koyama
- Smilax microphylla C.H.Wright
- Smilax minarum A.DC.
- Smilax minutiflora A.DC.
- Smilax modesta A.DC.
- Smilax mollis Humb. & Bonpl. ex Willd.
- Smilax moranensis Mart. & Galeotti
- Smilax munita S.C.Chen
- Smilax muscosa Toledo
- Smilax myosotiflora A.DC.
- Smilax myrtillus A.DC.
- Smilax nageliana A.DC.
- Smilax nana F.T.Wang
- Smilax nantoensis T.Koyama
- Smilax neocaledonica Schltr
- Smilax nervomarginata Hayata
- Smilax nigrescens F.T.Wang & Tang
- Smilax nipponica Miq.
- Smilax nova-guineensis T.Koyama
- Smilax obliquata Duhamel
- Smilax oblongata Sw.
- Smilax ocreata DC.
- Smilax odoratissima Blume
- Smilax officinalis Kunth
- Smilax orbiculata Labill.
- Smilax ornata Lem.
- Smilax orthoptera A.DC.
- Smilax outanscianensis Pamp.
- Smilax ovalifolia Roxb.
- Smilax ovatolanceolata T.Koyama
- Smilax pachysandroides T.Koyama
- Smilax paniculata M.Martens & Galeotti
- Smilax papuana Lauterb.
- Smilax perfoliata Lour.
- Smilax petelotii T.Koyama
- Smilax pilcomayensis Guagl. & S.Gattuso
- Smilax pilosa Andreata & Leoni
- Smilax pinfaensis H.Lév. & Vaniot
- Smilax plurifurcata A.DC.
- Smilax poilanei Gagnep.
- Smilax polyacantha Wall. ex Kunth
- Smilax polycolea Warb.
- Smilax populnea Kunth
- Smilax pottingeri Prain
- Smilax pseudochina L. – false chinaroot
- Smilax pulverulenta Michx.
- Smilax pumila Walter
- Smilax purhampuy Ruiz
- Smilax purpurata G.Forst.
- Smilax pygmaea Merr.
- Smilax quadrata A.DC.
- Smilax quadrumbellata T.Koyama
- Smilax quinquenervia Vell.
- Smilax remotinervis Hand.-Mazz.
- Smilax retroflexa (F.T.Wang & Tang) S.C.Chen
- Smilax riparia A.DC.
- Smilax rotundifolia L. – common greenbrier (Eastern United States)
- Smilax rubromarginata K.Krause
- Smilax rufescens Griseb.
- Smilax ruiziana Kunth
- Smilax salicifolia Griseb.
- Smilax sanguinea Posada-Ar.
- Smilax santaremensis A.DC.
- Smilax saulensis J.D.Mitch.
- Smilax schomburgkiana Kunth
- Smilax scobinicaulis C.H.Wright
- Smilax sebeana Miq.
- Smilax setiramula F.T.Wang & Tang
- Smilax setosa Miq.
- Smilax sieboldii Miq.
- Smilax sinclairii T.Koyama
- Smilax siphilitica Humb. & Bonpl. ex Willd.
- Smilax solanifolia A.DC.
- Smilax spicata Vell.
- Smilax spinosa Mill.
- Smilax spissa Killip & C.V.Morton
- Smilax spruceana A.DC.
- Smilax stans Maxim.
- Smilax stenophylla A.DC.
- Smilax subinermis C.Presl
- Smilax subpubescens A.DC.
- Smilax subsessiliflora Poir.
- Smilax synandra Gagnep.
- Smilax talbotiana A.DC.
- Smilax tamnoides L. – halberd-leaved greenbrier
- Smilax tetraptera Schltr
- Smilax timorensis A.DC.
- Smilax tomentosa Kunth
- Smilax trachypoda J.B.Norton
- Smilax trinervula Miq.
- Smilax tsinchengshanensis F.T.Wang
- Smilax tuberculata C.Presl
- Smilax turbans F.T.Wang & Tang
- Smilax utilis C.H.Wright
- Smilax vaginata Decne.
- Smilax vanchingshanensis (F.T.Wang & Tang) F.T.Wang & Tang
- Smilax velutina Killip & C.V.Morton
- Smilax verrucosa Griseb.
- Smilax verticalis Gagnep.
- Smilax vitiensis (Seem.) A.DC.
- Smilax wallichii Kunth
- Smilax walteri Pursh.
- Smilax wightii A.DC.
- Smilax williamsii Merr.
- Smilax yunnanensis S.C.Chen
- Smilax zeylanica L.

== Distribution and habitat ==
The genus has a pantropical distribution, extending into adjacent temperate zones to north and south. 29 species are recognized in Central America and the Caribbean, while there are 20 species in North America north of Mexico. In China, there are 80 species (39 of which are endemic).

== Ecology ==
The berry is rubbery in texture and has a large, spherical seed in the center. The fruit stays intact through winter, when birds and other animals eat them to survive. The seeds are passed unharmed in the animal's droppings. Since many Smilax colonies are single clones that have spread by rhizomes, both sexes may not be present at a site, in which case no fruit is formed.

Smilax is a very damage-tolerant plant capable of growing back from its rhizomes after being cut down or burned down by fire. This, coupled with the fact that birds and other small animals spread the seeds over large areas, makes the plants very hard to get rid of. It grows best in moist woodlands with a soil pH between 5 and 6. The seeds have the greatest chance of germinating after being exposed to a freeze.

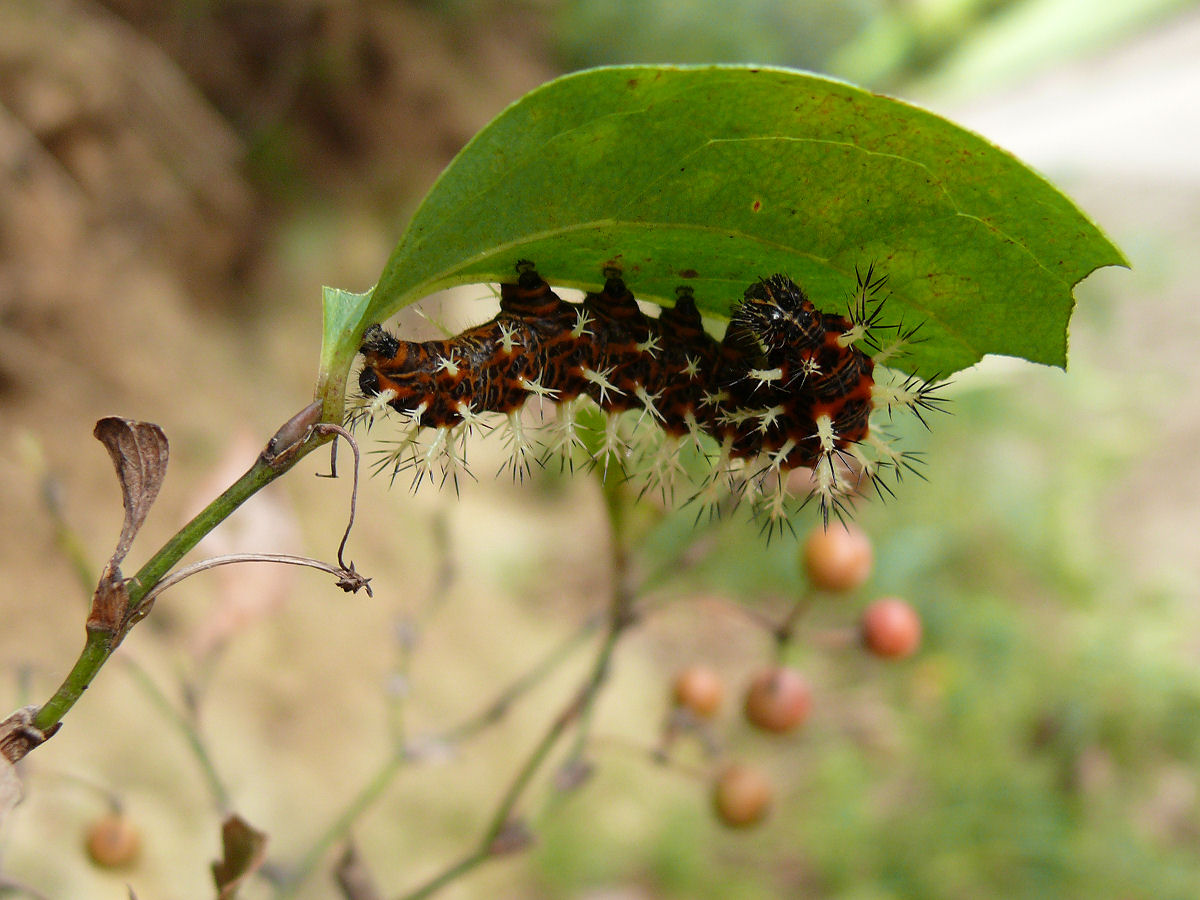
Blue admiral (Kaniska canace) caterpillar on China smilax (S. china)

Besides their berries providing an important food for birds and other animals during the winter, greenbrier plants also provide shelter for many other animals. The thorny thickets can effectively protect small animals from larger predators who cannot enter the prickly tangle. Deer and other herbivorous mammals will eat the foliage, as will some invertebrates such as Lepidoptera (butterflies and moths), which also often drink nectar from the flowers. Beetles too are known to consume leaves.

Among the Lepidoptera utilizing Smilax are Hesperiidae like the water snow flat (Tagiades litigiosa), Pieridae like the small grass yellow (Eurema smilax), or moths like the peculiar and sometimes flightless genus Thyrocopa. But particularly fond of greenbriers are certain Nymphalidae caterpillars, for example those of:

- Faunis – faun butterflies
- Kaniska canace – blue admiral (on China smilax, S. china)
- Phalanta phalantha – common leopard (on S. tetragona)

== Uses ==
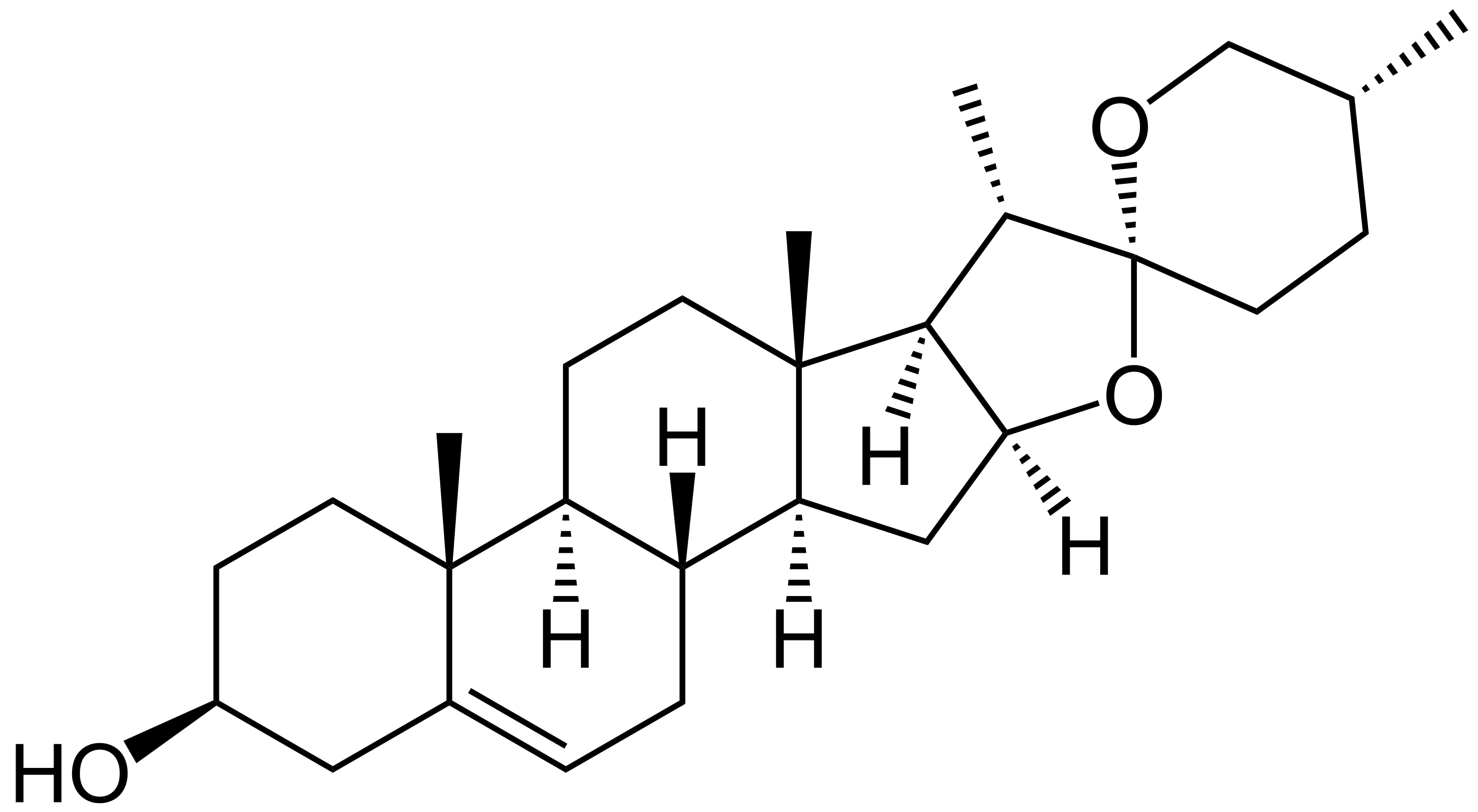
Diosgenin is found in S. menispermoidea.

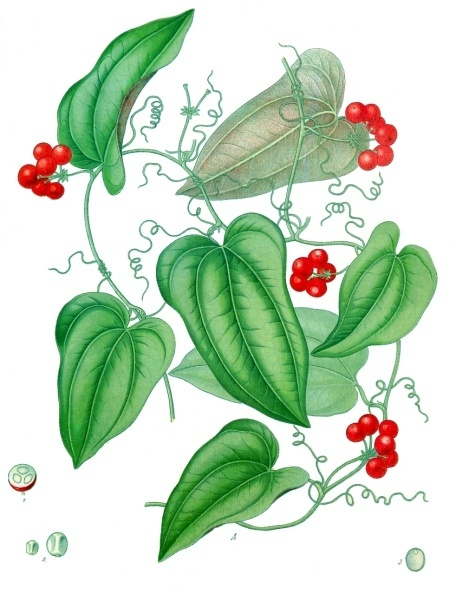
American sarsaparilla (S. aristolochiifolia) from Köhler's Medicinal Plants

An extract from the roots of some species – most significantly Jamaican sarsaparilla (S. ornata) – is used to make the sarsaparilla drink and other root beers, as well as herbal drinks like the popular Baba Roots from Jamaica. Two species, S. domingensis and S. havanensis, are used in a traditional soda-like Cuban beverage called pru. The roots may also be used in soups or stews. The young shoots can be eaten raw or cooked and are said to taste like asparagus, and the berries can be eaten both raw and cooked. Stuffed smilax pancake, or fúlíng jiābǐng (simplified Chinese: 茯苓夹饼; traditional Chinese: 茯苓夾餅), is a traditional snack from the Beijing region. S. glabra is used in Chinese herbology. It is also a key ingredient in the Chinese medical dessert guīlínggāo, which makes use of its property to set certain kinds of jelly.

The powdered roots of Jamaican sarsaparilla are known as Rad. Sarzae. Jam. in pharmacy and are used as a traditional medicine for gout in Latin American countries. Köhler's Medicinal Plants of 1887 discusses the American sarsaparilla (S. aristolochiifolia), but as early as about 1569, in his treatise devoted to syphilis, the Persian scholar Imad al-Din Mahmud ibn Mas‘ud Shirazi gave a detailed evaluation of the medical properties of chinaroot.

Diosgenin, a steroidal sapogenin, is reported from S. menispermoidea. Other active compounds reported from various greenbrier species are parillin (also sarsaparillin or smilacin), sarsapic acid, sarsapogenin and sarsaponin.

Due to the nectar-rich flowers, species like S. aristolochiifolia, S. bona-nox, S. tamnoides (S. medica is a synonym for all three of these species) and S. officinalis are also useful honey plants.

A common floral decoration sometimes called "smilax" is Asparagus asparagoides, which may look similar to real Smilax but is not closely related.

In 18th-century England, a type of beer called china-ale was made by infusing china-root (S. glabra) and coriander seeds in ale.

== Gallery ==
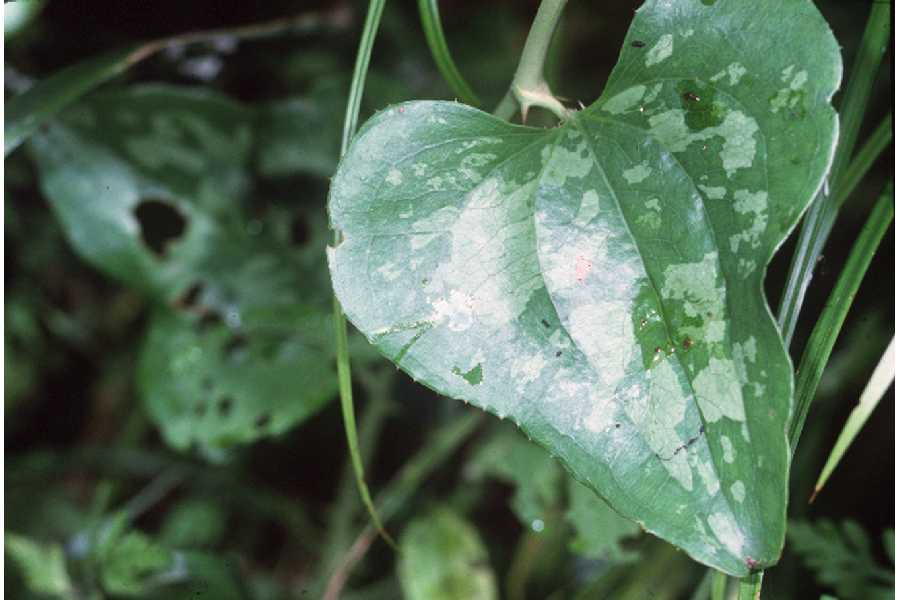
Smilax bona-nox

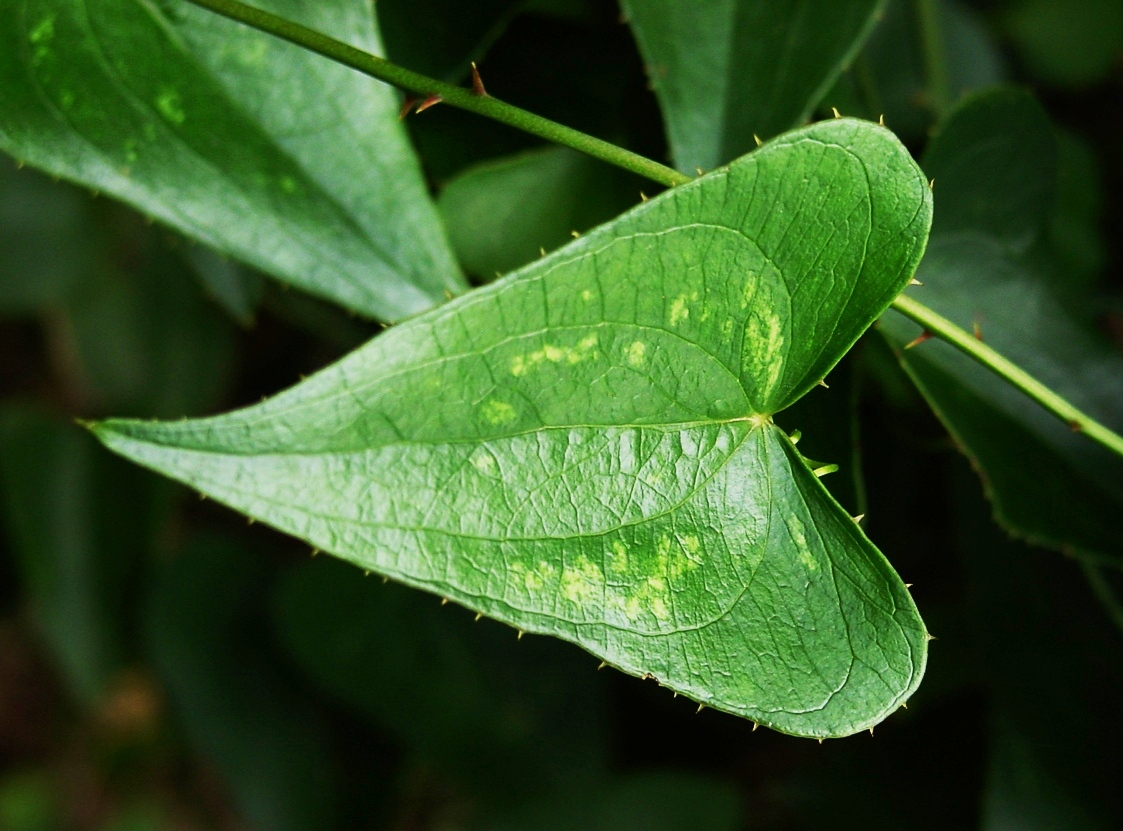
Smilax aspera

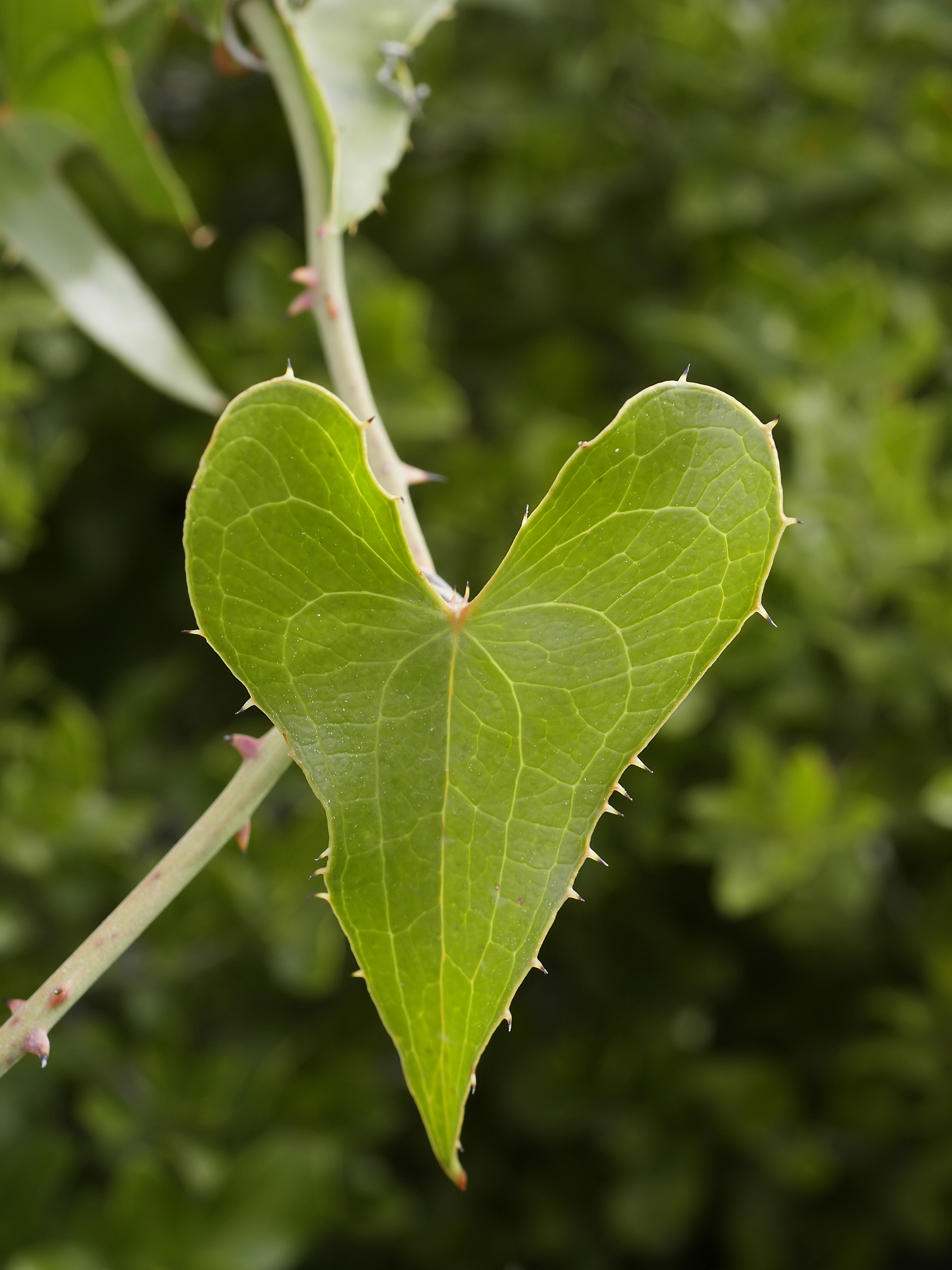
Smilax aspera

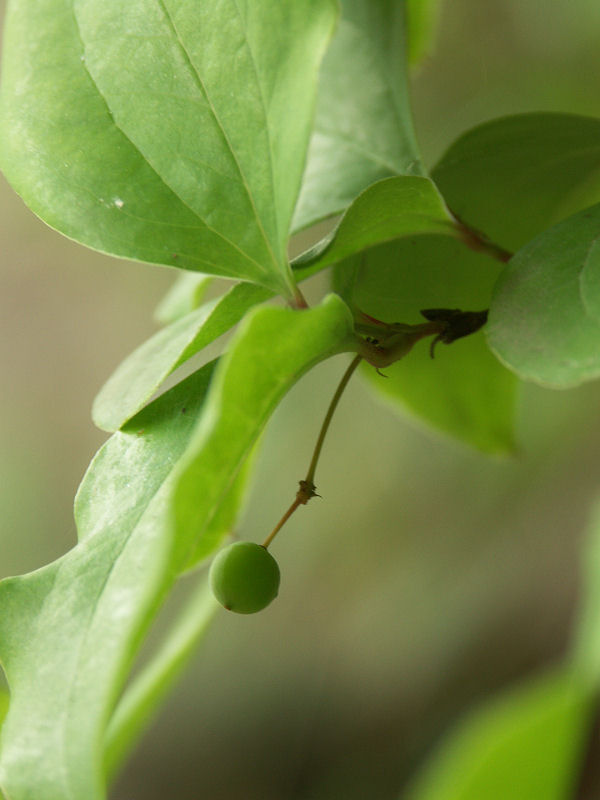
China smilax (S. china), unripe fruit

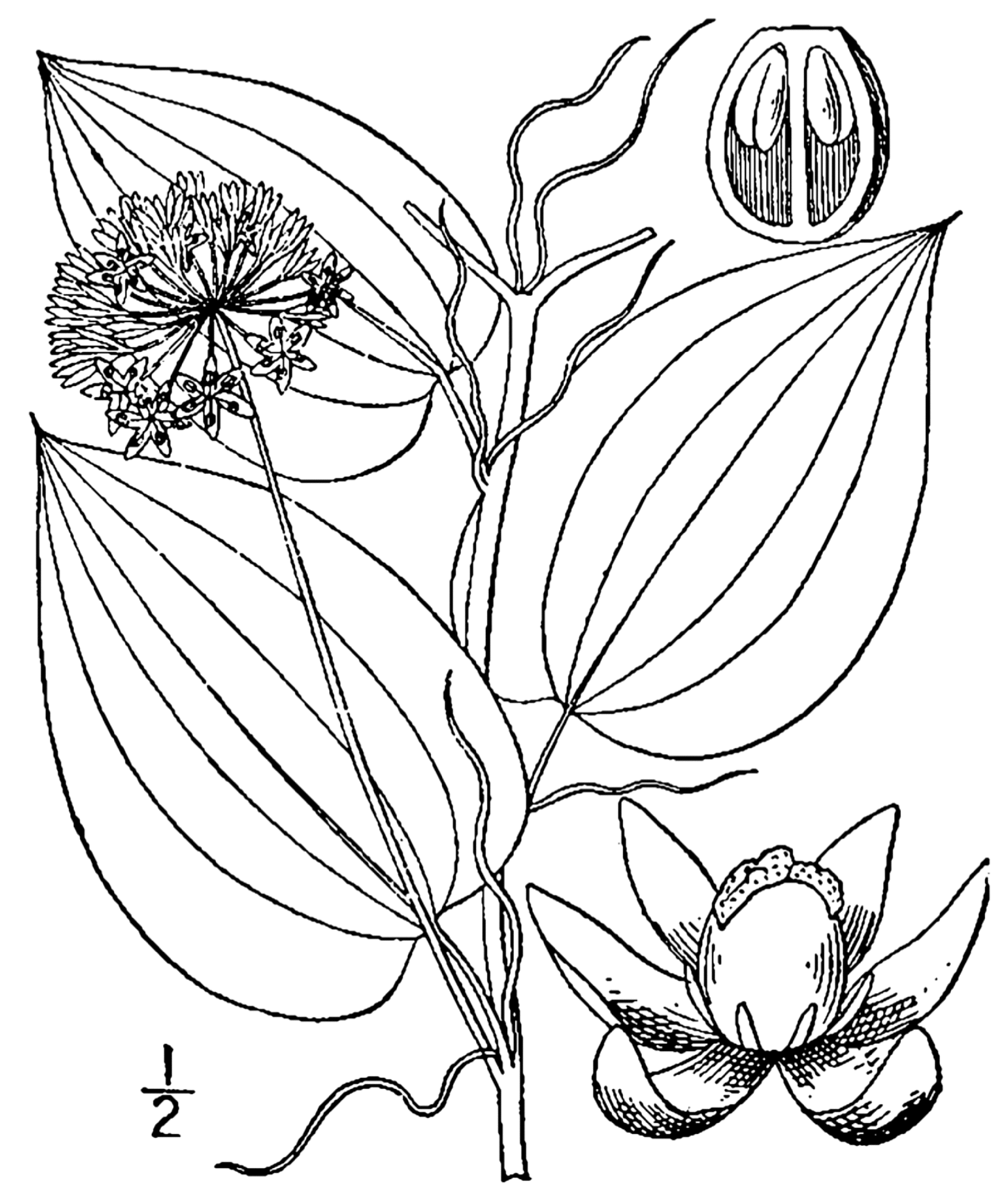
The "carrion flower", S. herbacea

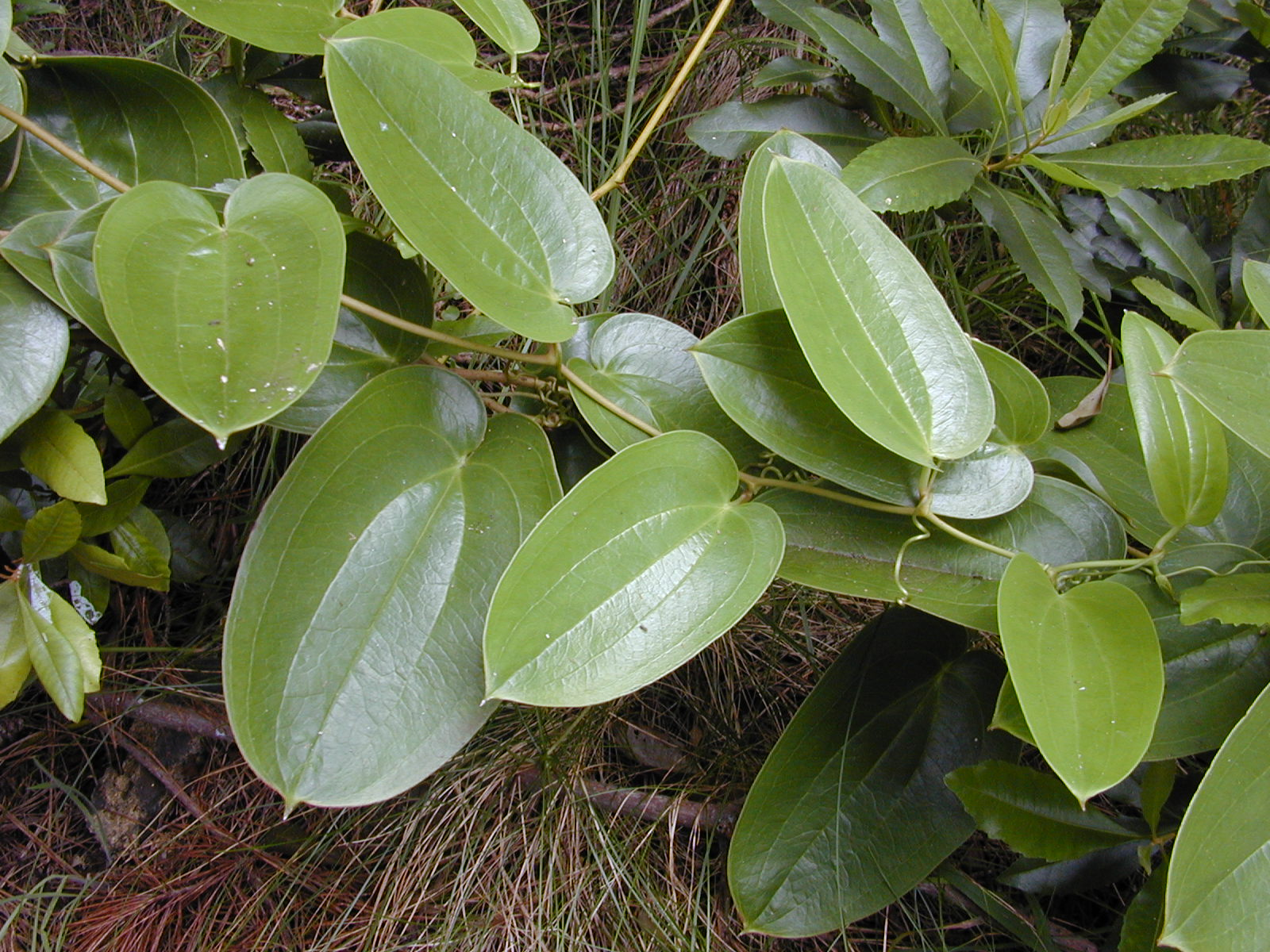
S. melastomifolia, called hoi kuahiwi on Hawaiʻi

== Bibliography ==
- Ferrufino-Acosta, Lilian (2010). "Taxonomic revision of the genus Smilax (Smilacaceae) in Central America and the Caribbean Islands". Willdenowia. 40 (2): 227–280. Bibcode:2010Willd..40..227F. doi:10.3372/wi.40.40208. ISSN 0511-9618. JSTOR 27896656. S2CID 85284808.
- Qi, Zhechen; Cameron, Kenneth M.; Li, Pan; Zhao, Yunpeng; Chen, Shichao; Chen, Guangcun; Fu, Chengxin (December 2013). "Phylogenetics, character evolution, and distribution patterns of the greenbriers, Smilacaceae (Liliales), a near-cosmopolitan family of monocots". Botanical Journal of the Linnean Society. 173 (4): 535–548. doi:10.1111/boj.12096.
- Mifsud, Stephen (2002): Wild Plants of Malta & Gozo – Mediterranean Smilax. Retrieved October 2, 2008.
