= List of Smilax species =

The following species in the flowering plant genus Smilax, the greenbriers, are accepted by Plants of the World Online. Because members of Smilax have wide morphological variation and are dioecious, it is a taxonomically difficult genus.

- Smilax aberrans Gagnep.
- Smilax aculeatissima Conran
- Smilax amamiana Z.S.Sun & P.Li
- Smilax amblyobasis K.Krause
- Smilax ampla Warb. ex K.Krause
- Smilax anceps Willd.
- Smilax anguina K.Krause
- Smilax annulata Warb. ex K.Krause
- Smilax aquifolium Ferrufino & Greuter
- Smilax arisanensis Hayata
- Smilax aristolochiifolia Mill.
- Smilax aspera L.
- Smilax aspericaulis Wall. ex A.DC.
- Smilax assumptionis A.DC.
- Smilax astrosperma F.T.Wang & Tang
- Smilax auriculata Walter
- Smilax australis R.Br.
- Smilax austrozhejiangensis Q.Lin
- Smilax azorica H.Schaef. & P.Schönfelder
- Smilax bapouensis H.Li
- Smilax basilata F.T.Wang & Tang
- Smilax bauhinioides Kunth
- Smilax bella J.F.Macbr.
- Smilax biflora Siebold ex Miq.
- Smilax biltmoreana (Small) J.B.Norton ex Pennell
- Smilax binchuanensis P.Li & C.X.Fu
- Smilax biumbellata T.Koyama
- Smilax blumei A.DC.
- Smilax bockii Warb.
- Smilax bona-nox L.
- Smilax borneensis A.DC.
- Smilax bracteata C.Presl
- Smilax brasiliensis Spreng.
- Smilax californica (A.DC.) A.Gray
- Smilax calophylla Wall. ex A.DC.
- Smilax cambodiana Gagnep.
- Smilax campestris Griseb.
- Smilax canariensis Willd.
- Smilax canellifolia Mill.
- Smilax celebica Blume
- Smilax chapaensis Gagnep.
- Smilax china L.
- Smilax chinensis (F.T.Wang) P.Li & C.X.Fu
- Smilax chingii F.T.Wang & Tang
- Smilax cinnamomea Desf. ex A.DC.
- Smilax cissoides M.Martens & Galeotti
- Smilax cocculoides Warb.
- Smilax cognata Kunth
- Smilax compta (Killip & C.V.Morton) Ferrufino
- Smilax corbularia Kunth
- Smilax cordato-ovata Rich.
- Smilax cordifolia Humb. & Bonpl. ex Willd.
- Smilax coriacea Spreng.
- Smilax cristalensis Ferrufino & Greuter
- Smilax cuprea Ferrufino & Greuter
- Smilax cuspidata Duhamel
- Smilax darrisii H.Lév.
- Smilax davidiana A.DC.
- Smilax densibarbata F.T.Wang & Tang
- Smilax discotis Warb.
- Smilax domingensis Willd.
- Smilax ecirrhata (Engelm. ex Kunth) S.Watson
- Smilax elastica Griseb.
- Smilax elegans Wall. ex Kunth
- Smilax elegantissima Gagnep.
- Smilax elmeri Merr.
- Smilax elongatoumbellata Hayata
- Smilax emeiensis J.M.Xu
- Smilax erecta Merr.
- Smilax excelsa L.
- Smilax extensa Wall. ex Hook.f.
- Smilax ferox Wall. ex Kunth
- Smilax flavicaulis Rusby
- Smilax fluminensis Steud.
- Smilax fooningensis F.T.Wang & Tang
- Smilax fortunensis Ferrufino & Gómez-Laur.
- Smilax fui Z.C.Qi & P.Li
- Smilax gagnepainii T.Koyama
- Smilax gaudichaudiana Kunth
- Smilax gigantea Merr.
- Smilax gigantocarpa Koord.
- Smilax glabra Roxb.
- Smilax glauca Walter
- Smilax glaucochina Warb.
- Smilax glyciphylla J.White
- Smilax goyazana A.DC.
- Smilax gracilior Ferrufino & Greuter
- Smilax griffithii A.DC.
- Smilax guianensis Vitman
- Smilax guiyangensis C.X.Fu & C.D.Shen
- Smilax havanensis Jacq.
- Smilax hayatae T.Koyama
- Smilax hemsleyana Craib
- Smilax herbacea L.
- Smilax hilariana A.DC.
- Smilax hirtellicaulis C.Y.Wu & C.Chen ex P.Li
- Smilax horridiramula Hayata
- Smilax hugeri (Small) J.B.Norton ex Pennell
- Smilax hypoglauca Benth.
- Smilax ilicifolia Desv.
- Smilax illinoensis Mangaly
- Smilax indosinica T.Koyama
- Smilax inversa T.Koyama
- Smilax irrorata Mart. ex Griseb.
- Smilax jamesii G.A.Wallace
- Smilax japicanga Griseb.
- Smilax javensis A.DC.
- Smilax kaniensis K.Krause
- Smilax keyensis Warb. ex K.Krause
- Smilax kingii Hook.f.
- Smilax klotzschii Kunth
- Smilax korthalsii A.DC.
- Smilax kwangsiensis F.T.Wang & Tang
- Smilax laevis Wall. ex A.DC.
- Smilax lanceifolia Roxb.
- Smilax lappacea Humb. & Bonpl. ex Willd.
- Smilax larvata Griseb.
- Smilax lasioneura Hook.
- Smilax laurifolia L.
- Smilax lebrunii H.Lév.
- Smilax leucophylla Blume
- Smilax ligneoriparia C.X.Fu & P.Li
- Smilax ligustrifolia A.DC.
- Smilax loheri Merr.
- Smilax longiflora (K.Y.Guan & Noltie) P.Li & C.X.Fu
- Smilax longifolia Rich.
- Smilax lucida Merr.
- Smilax luei T.Koyama
- Smilax lunglingensis F.T.Wang & Tang
- Smilax lushuiensis S.C.Chen
- Smilax lutescens Vell.
- Smilax luzonensis C.Presl
- Smilax macrocarpa Blume
- Smilax magnifolia J.F.Macbr.
- Smilax mairei H.Lév.
- Smilax malipoensis S.C.Chen
- Smilax maritima Feay ex Alph.Wood
- Smilax maypurensis Humb. & Bonpl. ex Willd.
- Smilax megacarpa A.DC.
- Smilax megalantha C.H.Wright
- Smilax melanocarpa Ridl.
- Smilax melastomifolia Sm.
- Smilax menispermoidea A.DC.
- Smilax micrandra (T.Koyama) P.Li & C.X.Fu
- Smilax micrantha Blume
- Smilax microdontus Z.S.Sun & C.X.Fu
- Smilax microphylla C.H.Wright
- Smilax minarum A.DC.
- Smilax minutiflora A.DC.
- Smilax modesta A.DC.
- Smilax mollis Humb. & Bonpl. ex Willd.
- Smilax moranensis M.Martens & Galeotti
- Smilax munita S.C.Chen
- Smilax muscosa Toledo
- Smilax myosotiflora A.DC.
- Smilax myrtillus A.DC.
- Smilax nageliana A.DC.
- Smilax nana F.T.Wang
- Smilax nantoensis T.Koyama
- Smilax neocaledonica Schltr.
- Smilax neocyclophylla I.M.Turner
- Smilax nervomarginata Hayata
- Smilax nigrescens F.T.Wang & Tang
- Smilax nipponica Miq.
- Smilax nova-guineensis T.Koyama
- Smilax obliquata Duhamel
- Smilax oblongata Sw.
- Smilax oblongifolia Pohl ex Griseb.
- Smilax ocreata A.DC.
- Smilax odoratissima Blume
- Smilax officinalis Kunth
- Smilax orbiculata Labill.
- Smilax ornata Lem.
- Smilax orthoptera A.DC.
- Smilax outanscianensis Pamp.
- Smilax ovalifolia Roxb. ex D.Don
- Smilax ovatolanceolata T.Koyama
- Smilax pachysandroides T.Koyama
- Smilax paniculata (Gagnep.) P.Li & C.X.Fu
- Smilax papuana Lauterb.
- Smilax perfoliata Lour.
- Smilax pertenuis T.Koyama
- Smilax petelotii T.Koyama
- Smilax pilcomayensis Guagl. & Gattuso
- Smilax pilosa Andreata & Leoni
- Smilax pinfaensis H.Lév. & Vaniot
- Smilax plurifurcata A.DC.
- Smilax poilanei Gagnep.
- Smilax polyacantha Wall. ex Kunth
- Smilax polyandra (Gagnep.) P.Li & C.X.Fu
- Smilax polyantha Griseb.
- Smilax polycolea Warb.
- Smilax populnea Kunth
- Smilax pottingeri Prain
- Smilax prolifera Roxb.
- Smilax pseudochina L.
- Smilax pulverulenta Michx.
- Smilax pumila Walter
- Smilax purhampuy Ruiz
- Smilax purpurata G.Forst.
- Smilax pygmaea Merr.
- Smilax quadrata A.DC.
- Smilax quadrumbellata T.Koyama
- Smilax quinquenervia Vell.
- Smilax remotinervis Hand.-Mazz.
- Smilax retroflexa (F.T.Wang & Tang) S.C.Chen
- Smilax riparia A.DC.
- Smilax rotundifolia L.
- Smilax roxburghiana Wall. ex A.DC.
- Smilax rubromarginata K.Krause
- Smilax rufescens Griseb.
- Smilax sailenii Sarma, Baruah & Borthakur
- Smilax salicifolia Griseb.
- Smilax sanguinea Posada-Ar.
- Smilax santaremensis A.DC.
- Smilax saulensis J.D.Mitch.
- Smilax schomburgkiana Kunth
- Smilax scobinicaulis C.H.Wright
- Smilax sebeana Miq.
- Smilax seisuiensis (Hayata) P.Li & C.X.Fu
- Smilax septemnervia (F.T.Wang & Tang) P.Li & C.X.Fu
- Smilax setiramula F.T.Wang & Tang
- Smilax setosa Miq.
- Smilax sieboldii Miq.
- Smilax silverstonei Botina
- Smilax sinclairii T.Koyama
- Smilax siphilitica Humb. & Bonpl. ex Willd.
- Smilax solanifolia A.DC.
- Smilax spicata Vell.
- Smilax spinosa Mill.
- Smilax spissa Killip & C.V.Morton
- Smilax spruceana A.DC.
- Smilax stans Maxim.
- Smilax stenophylla A.DC.
- Smilax subinermis C.Presl
- Smilax subpubescens A.DC.
- Smilax subsessiliflora Duhamel
- Smilax sumatrensis (A.DC.) P.Li & C.X.Fu
- Smilax synandra Gagnep.
- Smilax talbotiana A.DC.
- Smilax tamnoides L.
- Smilax tetraptera Schltr.
- Smilax timorensis A.DC.
- Smilax tomentosa Kunth
- Smilax trachypoda J.B.Norton
- Smilax trinervula Miq.
- Smilax tsinchengshanensis F.T.Wang
- Smilax tuberculata C.Presl
- Smilax turbans F.T.Wang & Tang
- Smilax utilis C.H.Wright
- Smilax vaginata Decne.
- Smilax vanchingshanensis (F.T.Wang & Tang) F.T.Wang & Tang
- Smilax velutina Killip & C.V.Morton
- Smilax verrucosa Griseb.
- Smilax verticalis Gagnep.
- Smilax vitiensis (Seem.) A.DC.
- Smilax wallichii Kunth
- Smilax walteri Pursh
- Smilax wightii A.DC.
- Smilax williamsii Merr.
- Smilax yunnanensis S.C.Chen
- Smilax zeylanica L.
