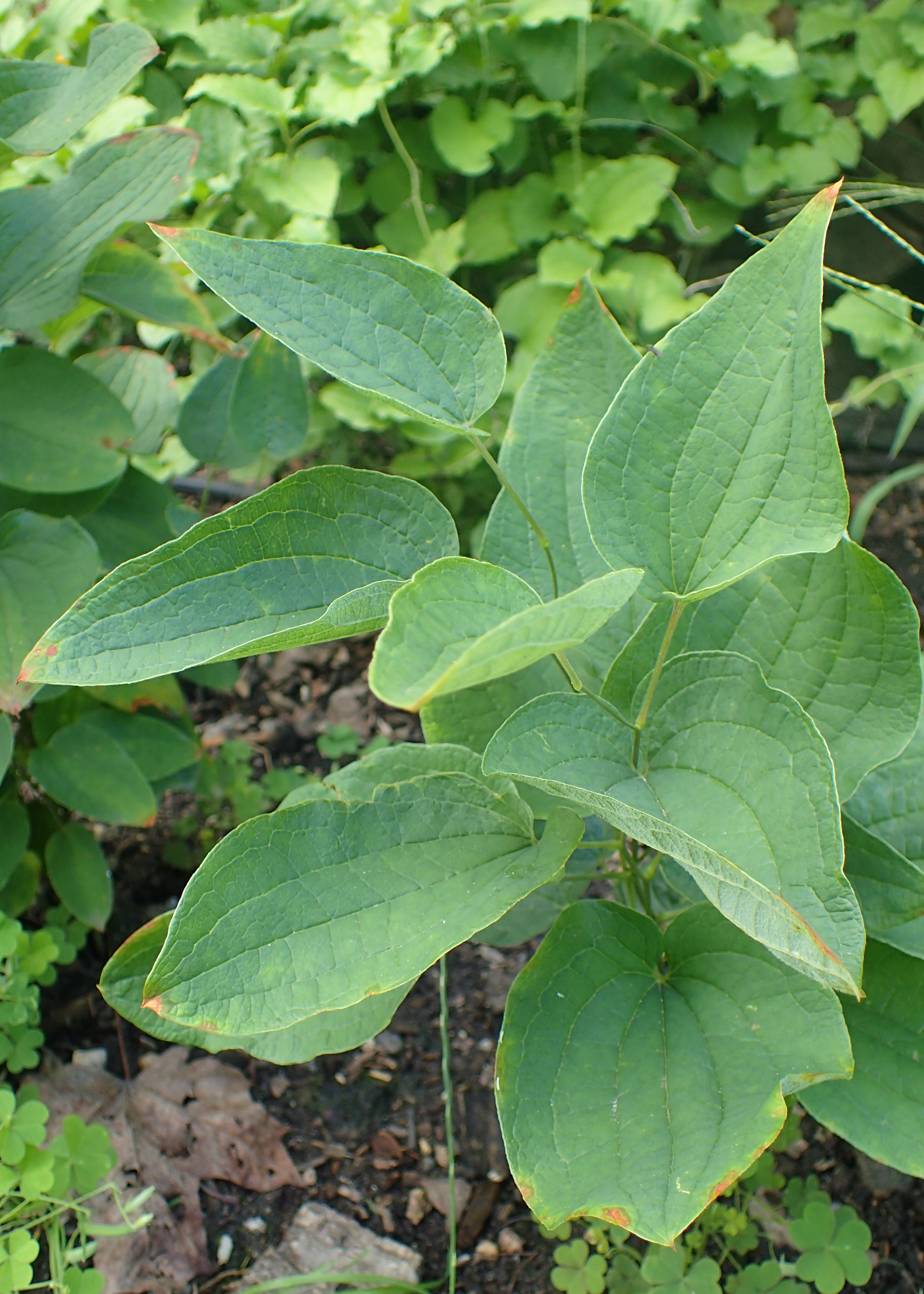
- Smilax lasioneura

Scientific classification
- Kingdom: Plantae
- Clade: Tracheophytes
- Clade: Angiosperms
- Clade: Monocots
- Order: Liliales
- Family: Smilacaceae
- Genus: Smilax
- Section: Smilax sect. Nemexia (Raf.) A.DC. & C.DC.

Species
- Smilax biltmoreana Small: Smilax ecirrhata (Engelman.) S. Wats.; Smilax herbacea L.; Smilax hugeri Small; Smilax lasioneura (Hook.) Rydb.; Smilax pseudochina L.; Smilax pulverulenta (Michx.) Small

= Smilax sect. Nemexia =

Group of flowering plants

Smilax sect. Nemexia is a section of plants in the family Smilacaceae. It consists of the herbaceous plants within the genus Smilax. Smilax species fall into two groups with distinctive morphologies: one group has woody perennial stems with thorns and a vining habit, while the other group has herbaceous stems that die back to the ground each winter. S. sect. Nemexia is the taxon that comprises the herbaceous species. In the past it was often a genus of its own under the name Nemexia and taxonomists still need further study of the species of Smilax to determine its proper rank. However the widely accepted taxonomic system of the Flora of North America does not recognize Nemexia, nor does the AP-site. Thus Nemexia is not currently considered an accepted genus taxon by most plant taxonomists.

The plants in Smilax, are called carrion flowers for their malodorous flowers and those plants included in section Nemexia also have flowers that smell like rotten meat. The herbaceous species have greenish-yellow flowers and bloom in spring, they are fly pollinated.

== Phylogenetic relationships ==
Cladistic analysis among several members of the section was carried out in 2005 on several gene sequences, including the plastid trnL-F and rpl16 sequences and the nuclear internal transcribed spacer. The eastern North American species in the morphologically variable S. herbacea complex form a sister group to the western North American S. jamesii. The analysis did not conclusively clarify whether the S. herbacea complex should be recognized as different species. The two East Asian species, S. riparia and S. nipponica, formed two well-defined clades. It is hypothesized that the ancestor of this section evolved in Asia and spread to North America via the Bering Strait land bridge.

- - - - - - S. biltmoreana
          - S. pulverulenta
        - - S. herbacea *
          - S. hugeri
        - S. herbacea *
        - S. lasioneuron
      - S. jamesii
    - - - S. riparia var. riparia
        - S. riparia var. acuminata
      - S. nipponica
  - S. tsinchengshanensis
- Heterosmilax japonica

A summary of the consensus of 10,000 parsimonious cladograms based on the combination of trnL-F, rpl16, and internal transcribed spacer sequences from the taxa used in the analysis. Heterosmilax japonica and S. tsinchengshanensis were used as the outgroup. Some species were represented by multiple populations; * indicates a species that appears twice, suggesting polyphyly.
