= Chinaroot =

Chinaroot, china-root, or china root may refer to:

- Smilax glabra, the traditional medicinal chinaroot
- Smilax china, a related climbing plant also known as chinaroot

== See also ==
- Smilax pseudochina, the false chinaroot
- Smilax, the larger genus
- Syphilis, a major disease previously treated with chinaroot
