= Smilax aculeatissima =

Scientific classification
- Kingdom: Plantae
- Clade: Tracheophytes
- Clade: Angiosperms
- Clade: Monocots
- Order: Liliales
- Family: Smilacaceae
- Genus: Smilax
- Species: S. aculeatissima

Binomial name
- Smilax aculeatissima Conran

Species of flowering plant

Smilax aculeatissima is a species of flowering plants known only from the State of Queensland in northeastern Australia.
