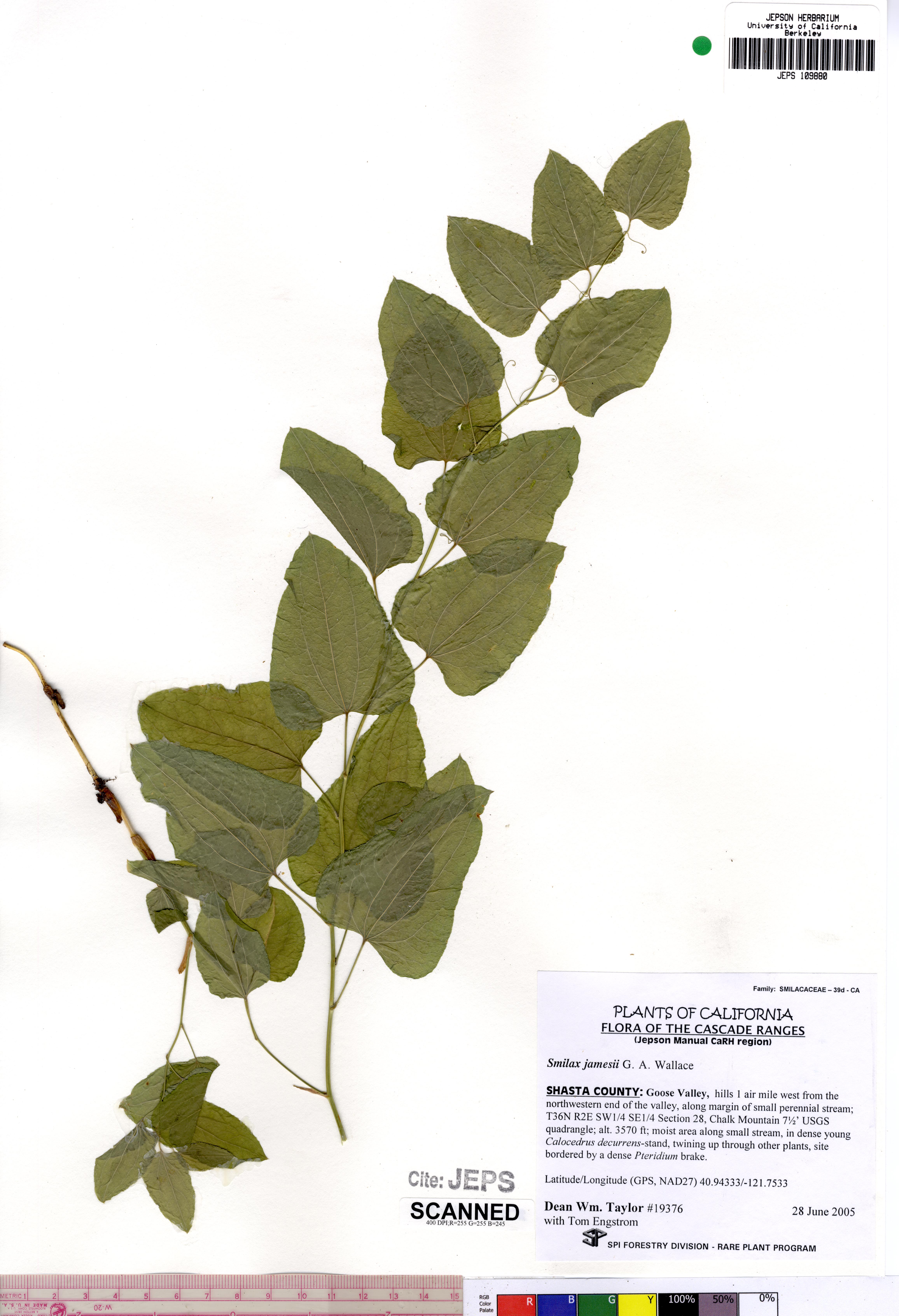
- herbarium specimen

Conservation status
- Vulnerable (NatureServe)

Scientific classification
- Kingdom: Plantae
- Clade: Embryophytes
- Clade: Tracheophytes
- Clade: Spermatophytes
- Clade: Angiosperms
- Clade: Monocots
- Order: Liliales
- Family: Smilacaceae
- Genus: Smilax
- Species: S. jamesii

Binomial name
- Smilax jamesii G.Wallace

= Smilax jamesii =

Species of flowering plant

Smilax jamesii is a species of flowering plant in the greenbriar family known by the common name English Peak greenbriar.

== Description ==
Smilax jamesii is a rhizomatous perennial herb taking the form of a vine, climbing and branching to maximum lengths of 2 to 3 metres (6 1/2 to 10 ft). The dark green leaves have blades up to 8 centimetres (3 1/8 in) long by 7 cm wide, triangular to pointed oval in shape. There are numerous tendrils.

The inflorescence is an umbel-shaped cluster of flowers blooming from the leaf axils. Male inflorescences contain up to 20 flowers, and the larger female inflorescences may have 40. The male and female flowers have similar petals but the female flower has a spherical ovary in the center. The mature fruit is a blue berry just under a centimeter wide which turns maroon in color as it dries.

== Taxonomy ==
It was discovered to be a new species when herbarium specimens thought to be Smilax californica were reexamined.

== Distribution and habitat ==
It is to northern California, where it is known from the Klamath Mountains and the southernmost peaks of the Cascade Range. It has also been reported from nearby locations in southwestern Oregon. It grows in moist areas such as lakesides and streambanks in mountain coniferous forest habitat.
