= Smilax moranensis =

Scientific classification
- Kingdom: Plantae
- Clade: Tracheophytes
- Clade: Angiosperms
- Clade: Monocots
- Order: Liliales
- Family: Smilacaceae
- Genus: Smilax
- Species: S. moranensis

Binomial name
- Smilax moranensis M.Martens & Galeotti

Synonyms
- Heterotypic Synonyms: Smilax acutifolia Schltdl.; Smilax botterii A.DC.; Smilax cordifolia var. papantlae A.DC.; Smilax cordifolia var. schiedeana (Kunth) A.DC.; Smilax densiflora A.DC.; Smilax densiflora var. christmarensis A.DC.; Smilax erythrocarpa Kunth; Smilax glaucocarpos Schltdl.; Smilax invenusta Kunth; Smilax invenusta var. armata A.DC.; Smilax jalapensis Schltdl.; Smilax jalapensis var. botterii (A.DC.) Killip & C.V.Morton; Smilax jalapensis var. inermis F.W.Apt; Smilax moranensis f. hispida C.V.Morton; Smilax moranensis var. mexiae Killip & C.V.Morton; Smilax moranensis var. schaffneriana A.DC.; Smilax schaffneriana (A.DC.) F.W.Apt; Smilax schiedeana Kunth; Smilax sylvatica Kunth; Smilax xalapensis Kunth

Species of flowering plant

Smilax moranensis is a species of flowering plant in the family Smilacaceae. It is native to mountainous areas in Mexico from Sonora and Chihuahua south to Chiapas.

Smilax moranensis is a trailing to climbing vine sometimes reaching a height of 10 m (33 feet). Leaves are broadly ovate, round and the base and slightly tapering toward the tip. Flowers are born in umbels in the axils of the leaves, each with 6 yellow-green tepals.

== Uses ==
The species is used medicinally throughout much of its range, under the common name zarzaparilla. It is valued for its expectorant, diuretic, and anti-inflammatory properties. It is also reportedly useful in treating Type 2 diabetes.
