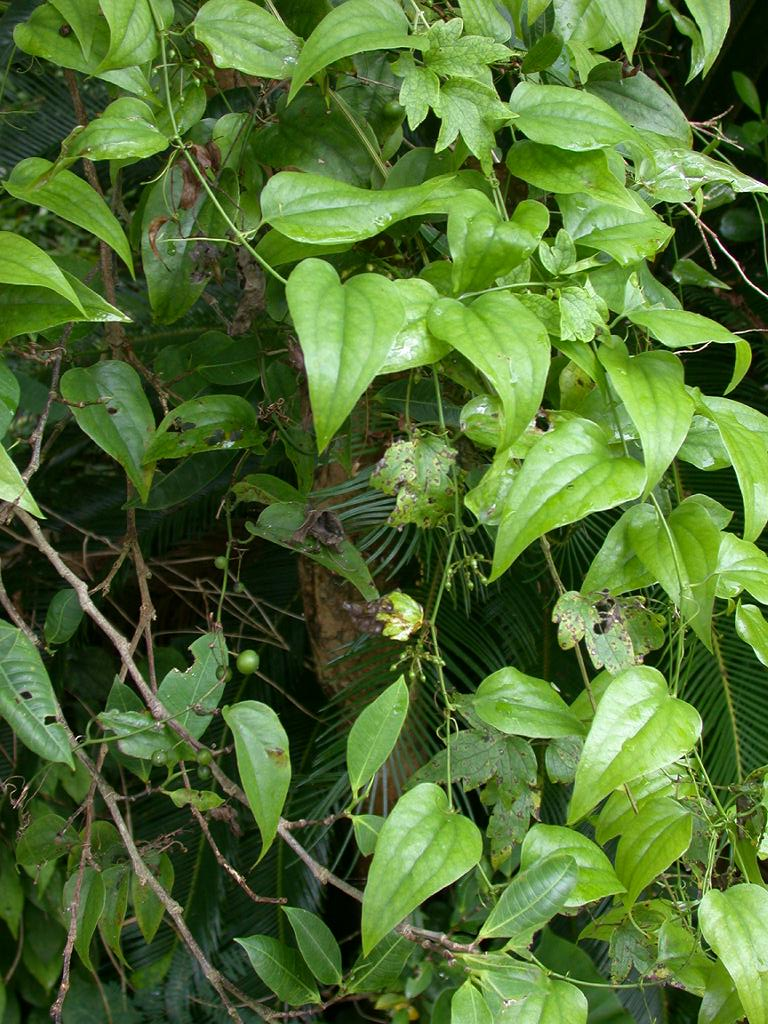
- Heterosmilax japonica

Scientific classification
- Kingdom: Plantae
- Clade: Tracheophytes
- Clade: Angiosperms
- Clade: Monocots
- Order: Liliales
- Family: Smilacaceae
- Genus: Smilax
- Section: Heterosmilax; Kunth

Synonyms
- Oligosmilax Seem.; Pseudosmilax Hayata

= Heterosmilax =

Genus of flowering plants

Heterosmilax was considered a genus of flowering plants in the family Smilacaceae. It was native to southern China and Southeast Asia. Subsequent molecular phylogenetic studies showed that it was embedded within another genus, Smilax and was reduced to a section within that genus.

Species

- Heterosmilax borneensis A.DC. - Cambodia, Thailand, Vietnam, Malaysia, Borneo, Sumatra
- Heterosmilax chinensis F.T.Wang - Guangdong, Guangxi, Sichuan, Yunnan
- Heterosmilax gaudichaudiana (Kunth) Maxim - Vietnam, Fujian, Guangdong, Guangxi, Hainan, Taiwan
- Heterosmilax longiflora K.Y.Guan & Noltie - Yunnan
- Heterosmilax micrandra T.Koyama - Hainan
- Heterosmilax micrantha (Blume) Bakh.f. - Java
- Heterosmilax paniculata Gagnep. - Cambodia, Vietnam
- Heterosmilax pertenuis (T.Koyama) T.Koyama - Thailand
- Heterosmilax polyandra Gagnep. - Yunnan, Assam, Laos, Thailand
- Heterosmilax seisuiensis (Hayata) F.T.Wang & Tang - Taiwan
- Heterosmilax septemnervia F.T.Wang & Tang - Vietnam, Guangdong, Guangxi, Guizhou, Hubei, Hunan, Sichuan, Yunnan
- Heterosmilax yunnanensis Gagnep. - Yunnan
