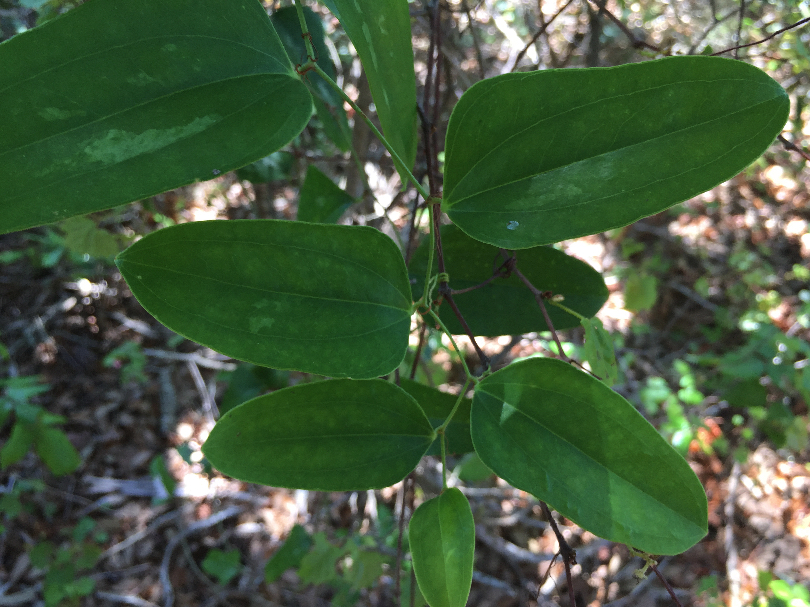

Scientific classification
- Kingdom: Plantae
- Clade: Tracheophytes
- Clade: Angiosperms
- Clade: Monocots
- Order: Liliales
- Family: Smilacaceae
- Genus: Smilax
- Species: S. auriculata

Binomial name
- Smilax auriculata Walter

Synonyms
- Smilax beyrichii Kunth; Smilax lata Small; Smilax ovata Elliott 1824, illegitimate homonym not Duhamel 1803

= Smilax auriculata =

Species of plant

Smilax auriculata is a North American plant species native to the Bahamas, the Turks and Caicos Islands, and the southeastern United States. Common names include earleaf greenbrier and wild-bamboo, despite the fact that it is not closely related to bamboo. It is reported from Florida, Georgia, North and South Carolina, Alabama, Mississippi, and Louisiana. It grows on coastal sand dunes and in sun-lit locations in sandy woodlands at elevations of less than 100 m (333 feet).

Smilax auriculata is a perennial vine, producing underground rhizomes and sometimes tubers. Plants are climbers with zigzag branching, sometimes reaching a height of 9 m (30 feet). Prickles on the stem are flattened and rigid, about 4 mm (0.16 inches) long. Leaves are evergreen, narrowly ovate, not waxy, up to 8.5 cm (3.4 inches) long. Flowers are green, borne in umbels of 3–8 flowers. Berries are dark purple, almost black, about 6 mm (0.24 inches) in diameter.
