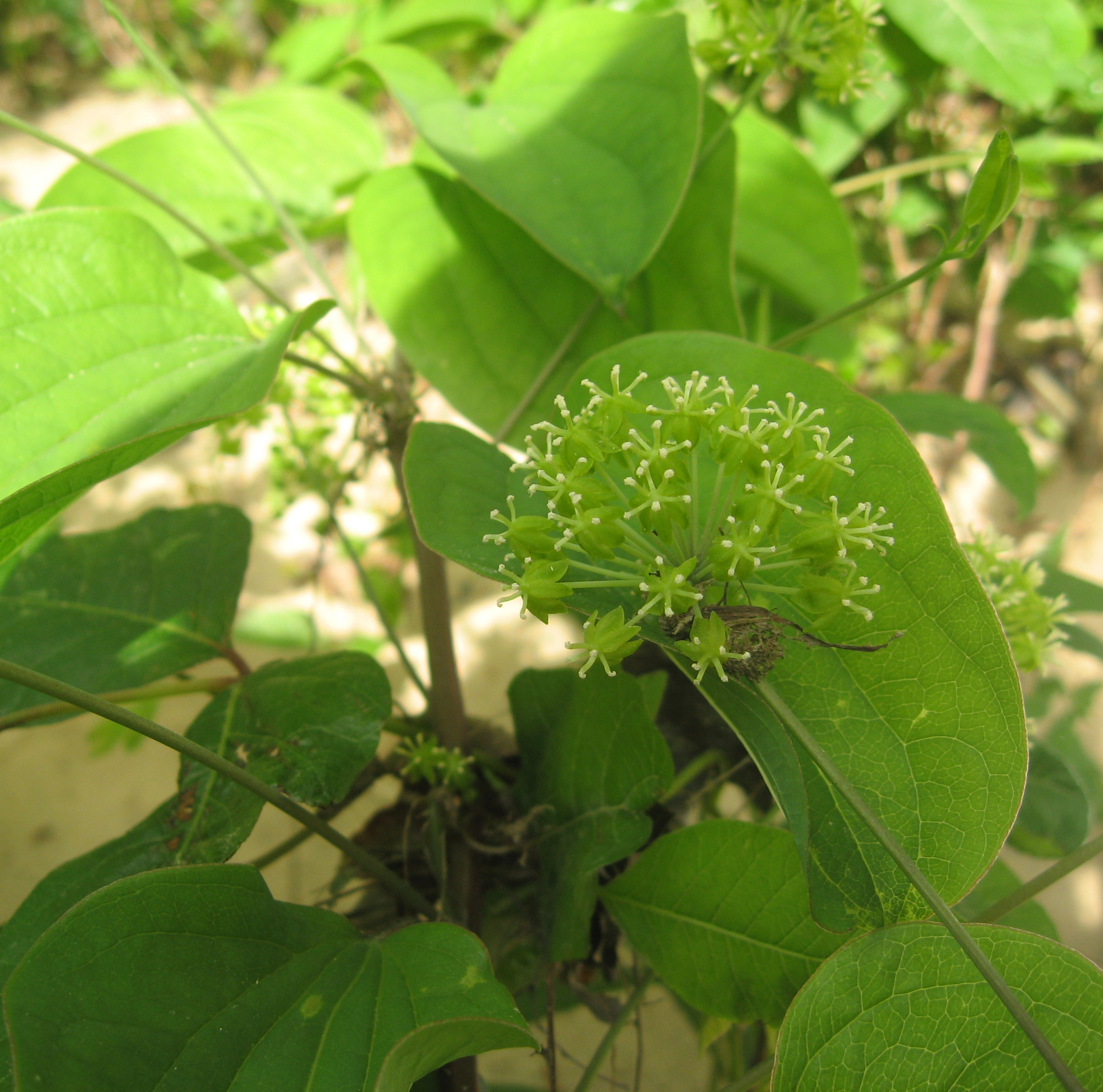

Scientific classification
- Kingdom: Plantae
- Clade: Tracheophytes
- Clade: Angiosperms
- Clade: Monocots
- Order: Liliales
- Family: Smilacaceae
- Genus: Smilax
- Section: Smilax sect. Nemexia
- Species: S. herbacea

Binomial name
- Smilax herbacea L.

Synonyms
- Synonymy: Coprosmanthus herbaceus (L.) Kunth; Nemexia herbacea (L.) Small; Smilax peduncularis Muhl. ex Willd.; Nemexia cerulea Raf.; Nemexia nigra Raf.; Smilax longifolia P.Watson 1825, not Rich. 1792; Smilax watsonii Sweet; Coprosmanthus consanguineus Kunth; Coprosmanthus peduncularis (Muhl. ex Willd.) Kunth

= Smilax herbacea =

Species of flowering plant

Smilax herbacea is a perennial, herbaceous climbing vine in the family of Smilacaceae. It is native to eastern North America, including parts of eastern Canada and the eastern United States. It is commonly known by people as the smooth carrion flower, smooth herbaceous greenbrier, carrion vine, or as Jacob's-ladder. The species is known for being smooth in texture, and usually has thornless stems, it is a plant that can grow by climbing, and it has green colored flowers that have a foul, carrion-like odor which attracts flies and beetles for pollination. This plant grows in moist forests, savannas, meadows, and thickets, at moderate to high elevations. This allows it to serve as an understory vine (a climbing plant that grows in the forest's lower layer, beneath the main tree canopy). The plant blooms in May and June, and female individuals produce clusters of dark blue to nearly black berries later in the season. In addition to its ecological role, the species has a long history of use as both a food and medicinal plant.

== Taxonomy and classification ==
Smilax herbacea is a member of the order Liliales in the monocot clade, and is a member of the genus Smilax. The species was first described in 1753 by Carl Linnaeus. At first, S. herbacea was thought to be placed under the genus Nemexia, but then modern phylogenetic studies, including DNA barcoding evidence, strongly supported the inclusion of this plant species within Smilax rather than Nemexia. Recent phylogeographic work on this plant has also found that herbaceous North American species diverged during the Pleistocene era (ca. 1–1.5 million years ago) because of expanding and contracting glacial cycles. Furthermore, comparative morphological and molecular research have identified closely related species to this plant in Asia, including Smilax hirtellicaulis.

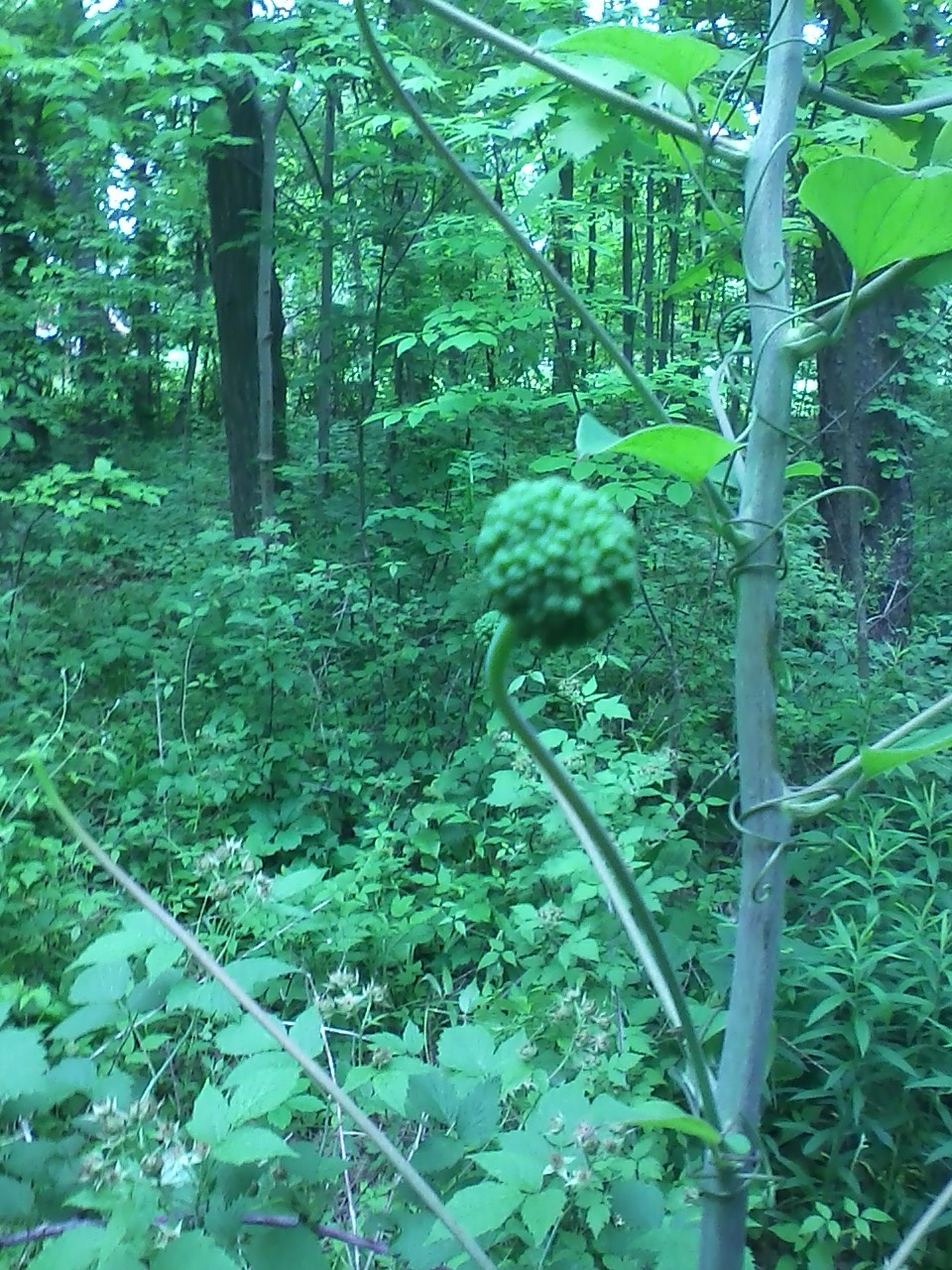
Smilax herbacea flowers in bud form

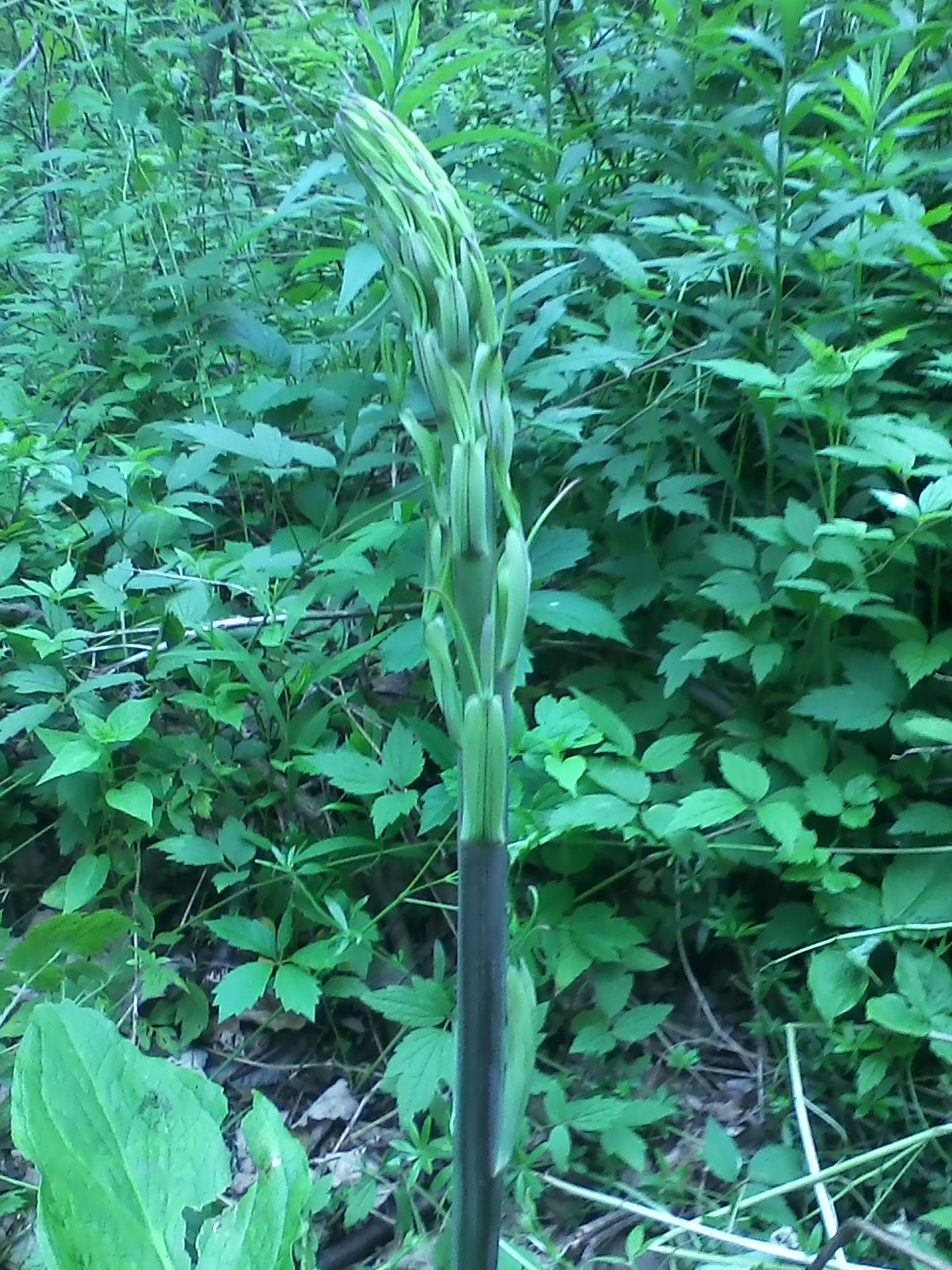
Young sprout of Smilax herbacea at 2' in height

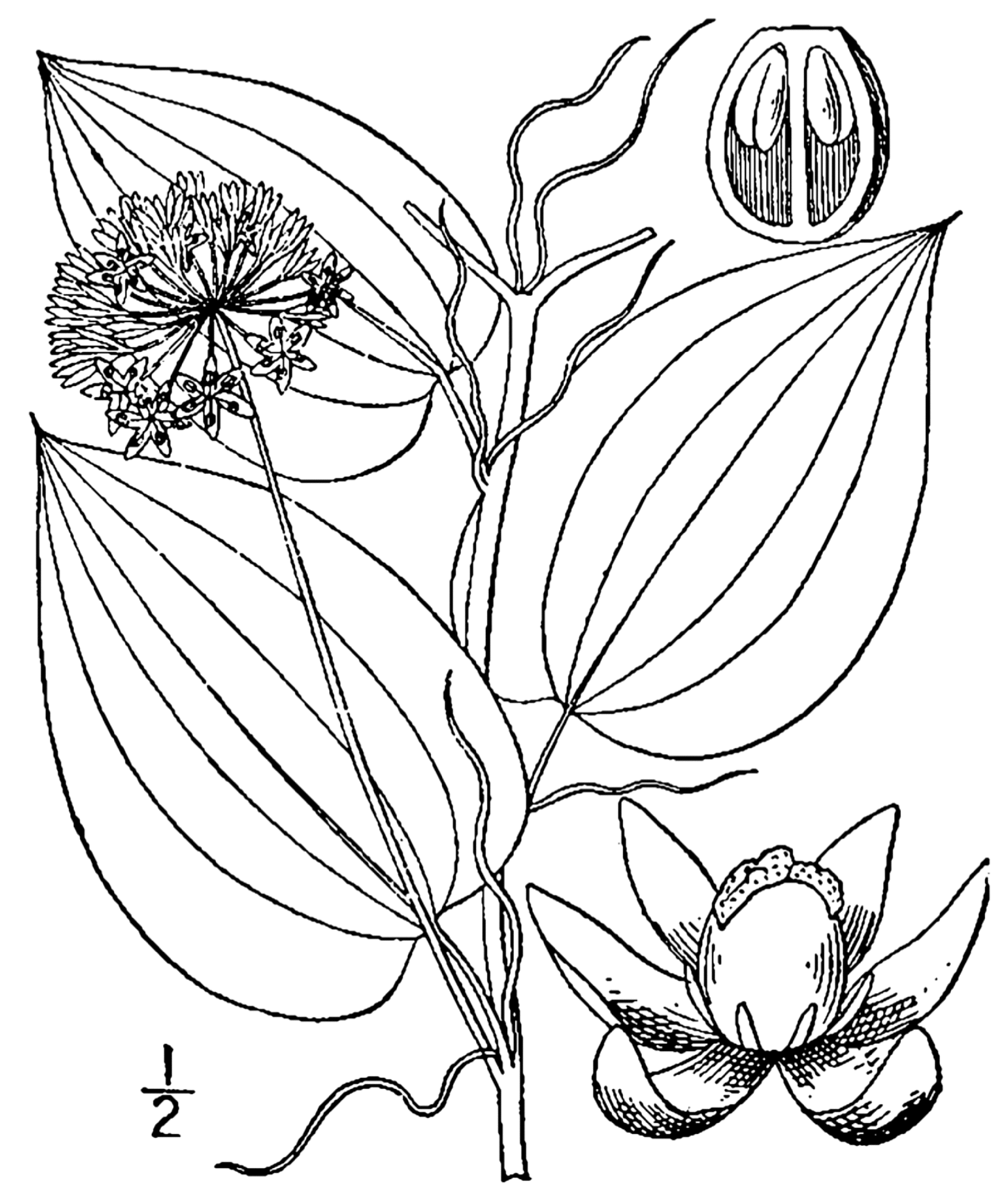
Line drawing of Smilax herbacea showing it's floral details

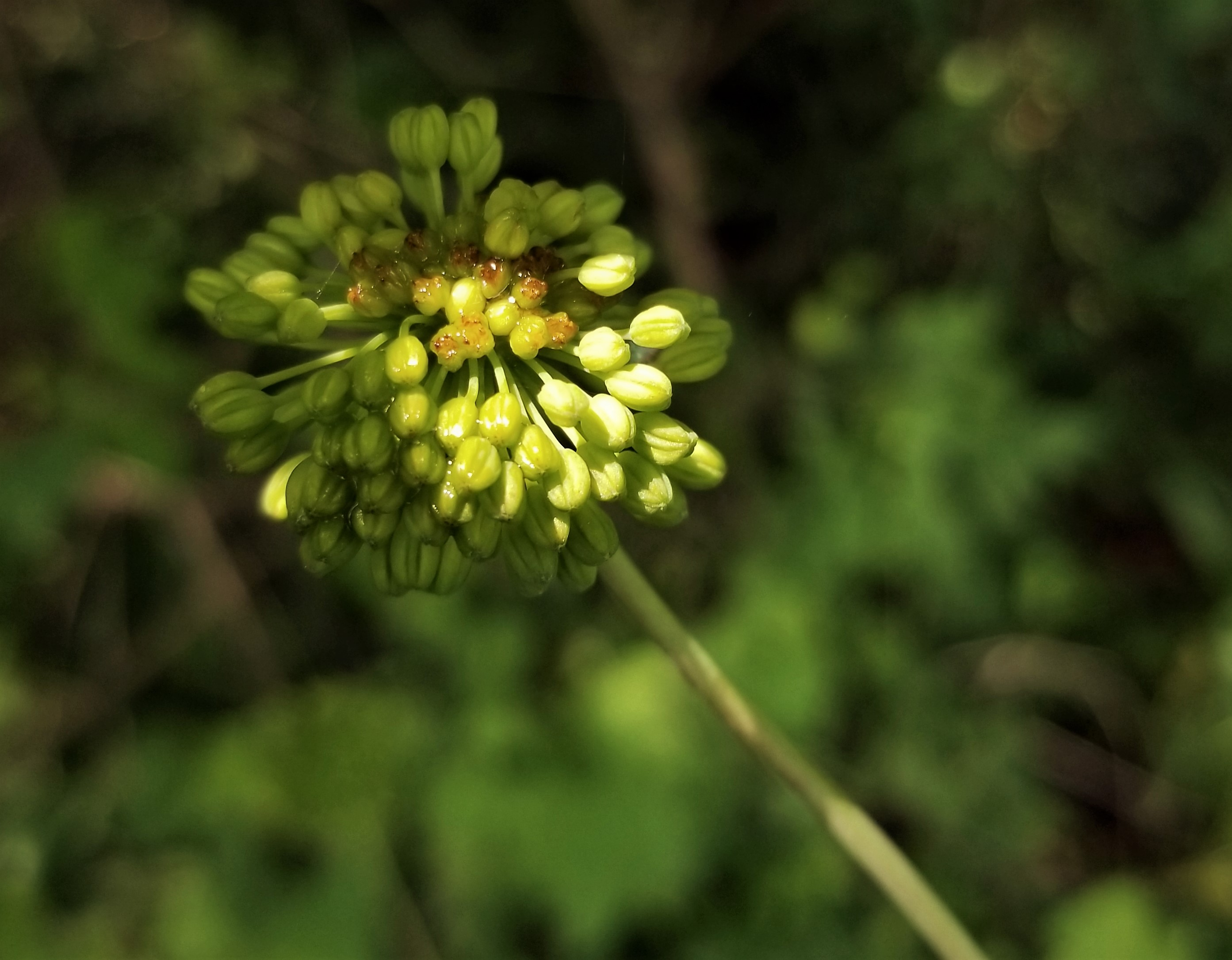
Smilax herbacea flower prior to opening

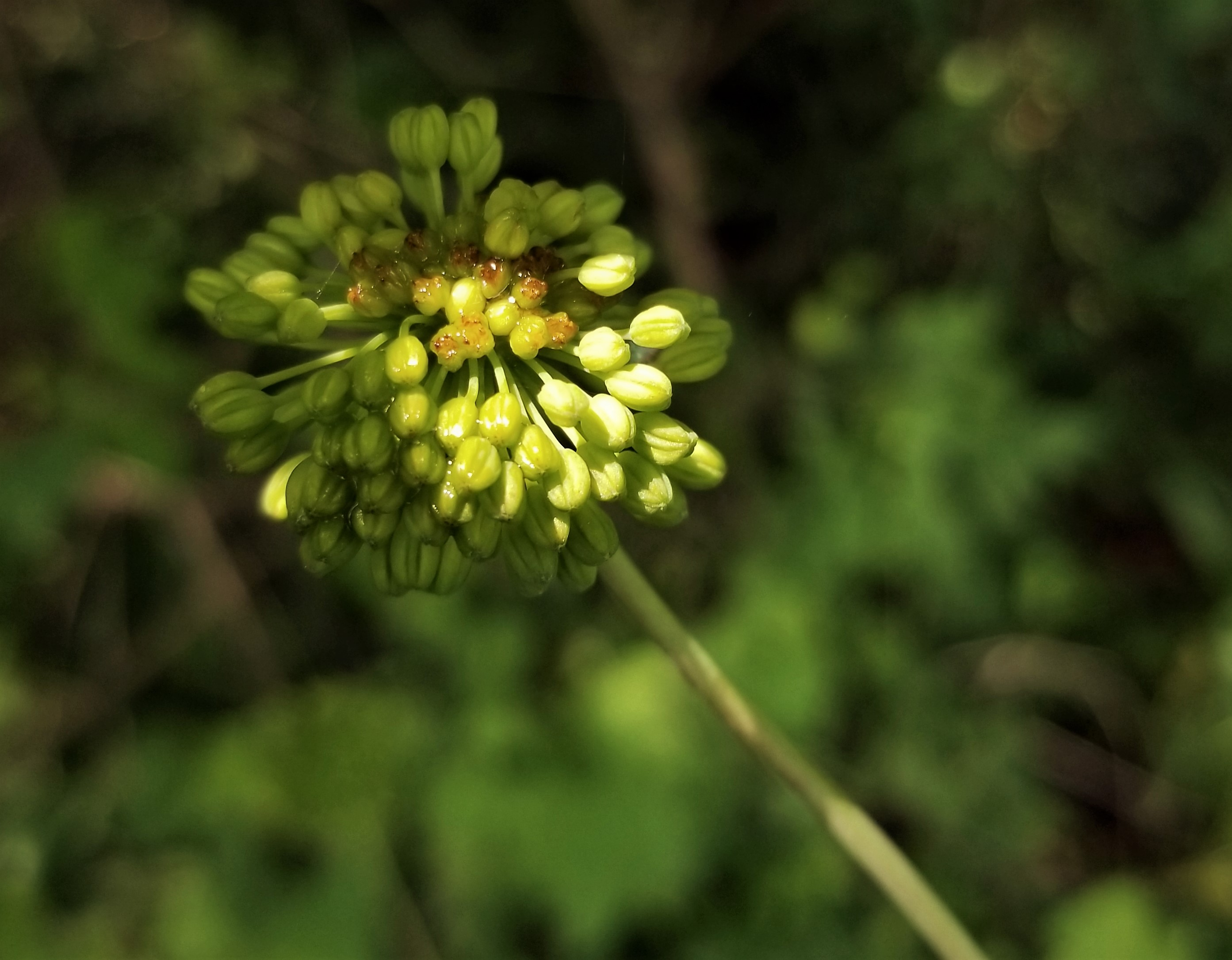
Smilax herbacea flower prior to opening

== Description ==
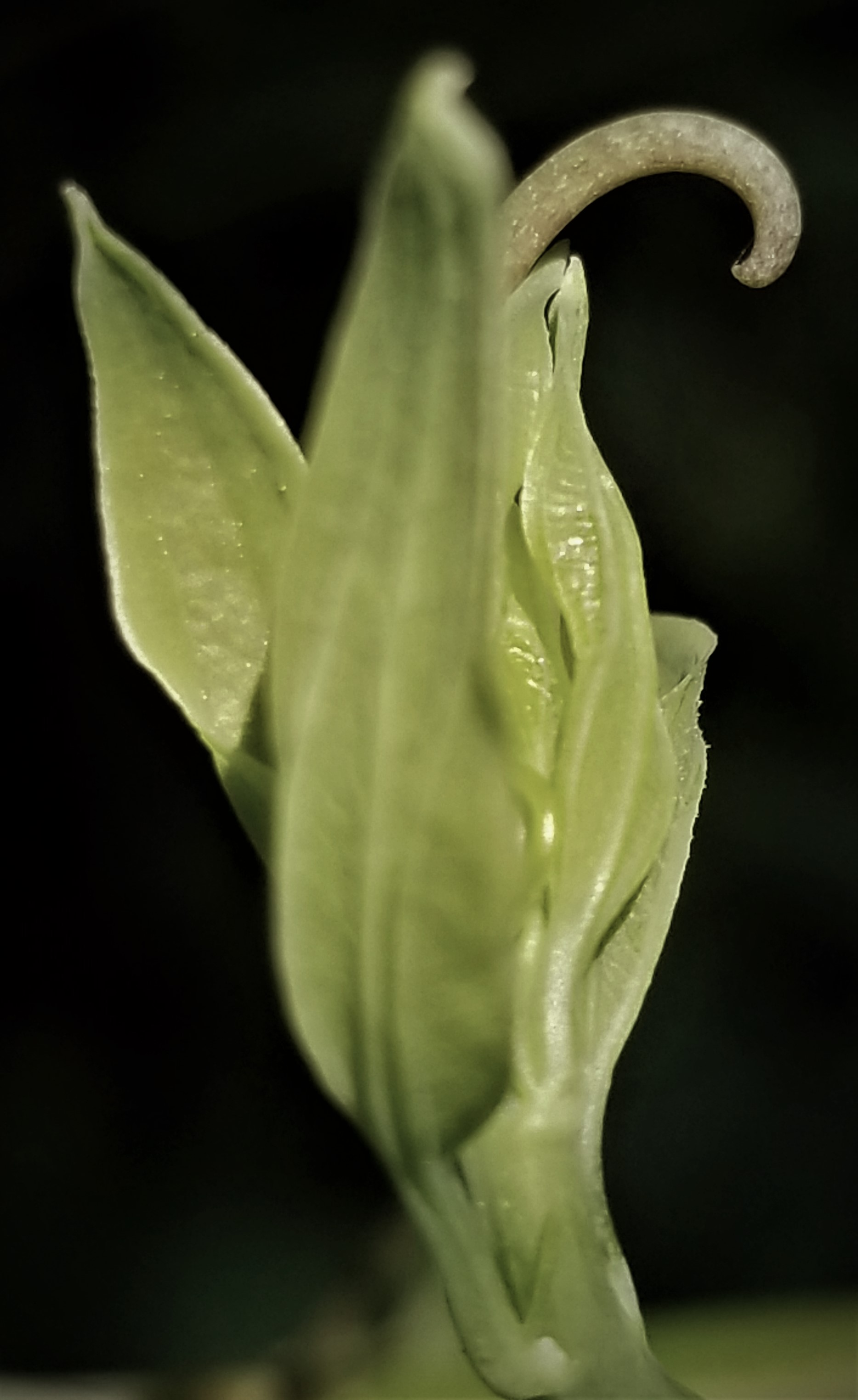
Detailed image of the new growth of Smilax herbacea

Smilax herbacea grows as a smooth, green shoot from a perennial rhizome each spring. As the plant grows, the shoot becomes a climbing vine, which can reach six to nine feet in height if support is available, but without support, the stems will spread out on the ground. The stems of this plant are usually very smooth, although some plants may have scattered small thorns depending on the population. Leaves are arranged alternately and appear heart-shaped, growing five to fifteen centimeters long with three to seven prominent veins in them. The upper leaf surfaces are smooth and dark green, while the undersides are pale green and hairless. The leaf petioles have short tendrils that allow the vine to attach to other vegetation or structures. The plant also has long peduncles, which can reach up to ten centimeters in length.

== Flowers and fruit ==
For Smilax herbacea, flowering occurs mostly in May and June. The plant produces numerous small green to yellow-green flowers arranged in large clusters, which is the source of its characteristic odor. In this flower, only female vines are able to produce fruit. These flowers then develop into berries that are dark blue to black when they are ripe. Each berry typically contains multiple seeds, and the fruits are arranged in tight clusters. They usually mature in late summer and sometimes continue to grow into the winter if they are not consumed.

== Reproduction ==
Smilax herbacea is dioecious, meaning male and female flowers occur on separate plants. The flowers are arranged in spherical umbels on elongated stalks and are green to yellow-green in color. Individual flowers can usually stay alive for about four days. Both male and female flowers in this plant have nectar glands at their bases, which is how they attract a variety of pollinators. The flowers emit a strong carrion odor, which is used in order to attract carrion flies and beetles.

== Distribution and habitat ==
Smilax herbacea is native to eastern North America. In Canada, it grows in Ontario, Quebec, and New Brunswick. In the United States, it can be found in New England, Alabama, Georgia, and it is also found in smaller quantities at higher elevations in the Midwest.

This plant usually grows in moist, nutrient-rich environments such as deciduous forests, riparian thickets, moist meadows and lowlands, open or partially open savannas, and some forests. In terms of soil, it can grow in clay, loam, or sandy soils, as long as there is enough moisture present. It can grow in shade but prefers areas with full or partial sun. This plant is also highly adaptable and can grow in habitats that experience fluctuations in moisture and sunlight.

== Ethnobotany and human use ==
The young shoots and leaves of Smilax herbacea are edible and can be eaten raw or cooked. They are usually compared to asparagus in flavor and texture. The ripe berries can also be consumed fresh or used to produce jelly. The roots can also be dried, powdered, and used as a thickening flour or as a starchy component for many of the traditional foods of indigenous people. This species is also used by indigenous groups as a medicinal plant. Indigenous groups, including the Cherokee, traditionally have been the ones to use this plant medicinally. It has been used for treatments of rheumatism and arthritis, remedies for kidney and urinary issues, poultices for burns, sores, and skin eruptions, and decoctions for cramps, lung conditions, and back pain.
