= Smilax illinoensis =

Scientific classification
- Kingdom: Plantae
- Clade: Tracheophytes
- Clade: Angiosperms
- Clade: Monocots
- Order: Liliales
- Family: Smilacaceae
- Genus: Smilax
- Species: S. illinoensis

Binomial name
- Smilax illinoensis Mangaly

Species of flowering plant

Smilax illinoensis , the Illinois greenbrier, is a North American species of plants found only in the United States and Canada. It is native primarily to the Great Lakes Region with a few populations further south in Missouri and in the Ohio Valley.

Smilax illinoensis is an upright, unbranched herb up to 100 cm (39 inches) tall, with no prickles. It grows in woods and thickets.
