= Smilax havanensis =

Everglades Greenbrier

Scientific classification
- Kingdom: Plantae
- Clade: Tracheophytes
- Clade: Angiosperms
- Clade: Monocots
- Order: Liliales
- Family: Smilacaceae
- Genus: Smilax
- Species: S. havanensis

Binomial name
- Smilax havanensis Jacq.

Synonyms
- Smilax ovata Duhamel; Smilax spinosa Poir. 1805, not Mill. 1768; Smilax dentata Humb. & Bonpl. ex Willd.; Smilax poiretii Kunth; Smilax havanensis Griseb.

Species of flowering plant

Smilax havanensis, known as the everglades greenbrier, is a plant species native to Cuba, the Cayman Islands, Bahamas, Turks & Caicos, and southern Florida.

Smilax havanensis is a perennial vine armed with prickles. Flowers are small and green, berries dark purple with a waxy coating. Aprostocetus smilax, an Eulophid wasp, induces galls on this species.
