= Smilax pumila =

Scientific classification
- Kingdom: Plantae
- Clade: Tracheophytes
- Clade: Angiosperms
- Clade: Monocots
- Order: Liliales
- Family: Smilacaceae
- Genus: Smilax
- Species: S. pumila

Binomial name
- Smilax pumila Walter

Synonyms
- Synonymy: Parillax pumila (Walter) Raf.; Smilax humilis Mill.; Smilax pubera Michx.; Smilax puberula Kunth

Species of flowering plant

Smilax pumila, the sarsaparilla vine, is a North American species of plants native to the southeastern United States from eastern Texas to South Carolina. It can be found in habitats such as forested floodplains and alongside rivers.

Smilax pumila is the only smilax species to not have thorns. It either runs along the ground or clambers up other vegetation. Flowers are yellow; fruits red and egg-shaped.
