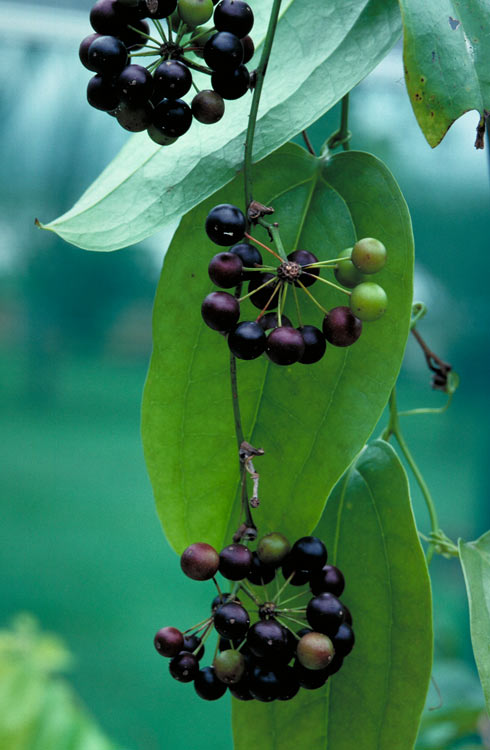

Scientific classification
- Kingdom: Plantae
- Clade: Embryophytes
- Clade: Tracheophytes
- Clade: Spermatophytes
- Clade: Angiosperms
- Clade: Monocots
- Order: Liliales
- Family: Smilacaceae
- Genus: Smilax
- Species: S. blumei

Binomial name
- Smilax blumei A.DC.

Synonyms
- Smilax perfoliata Blume 1827, illegitimate homonym not Lour. 1790

= Smilax blumei =

Species of flowering plant

Smilax blumei is a vine in the greenbrier family. It is native to parts of Southeast Asia (Thailand, Andaman Islands, Peninsular Malaysia, Java) as well as to New Guinea and northern Australia (Queensland and Northern Territory).
