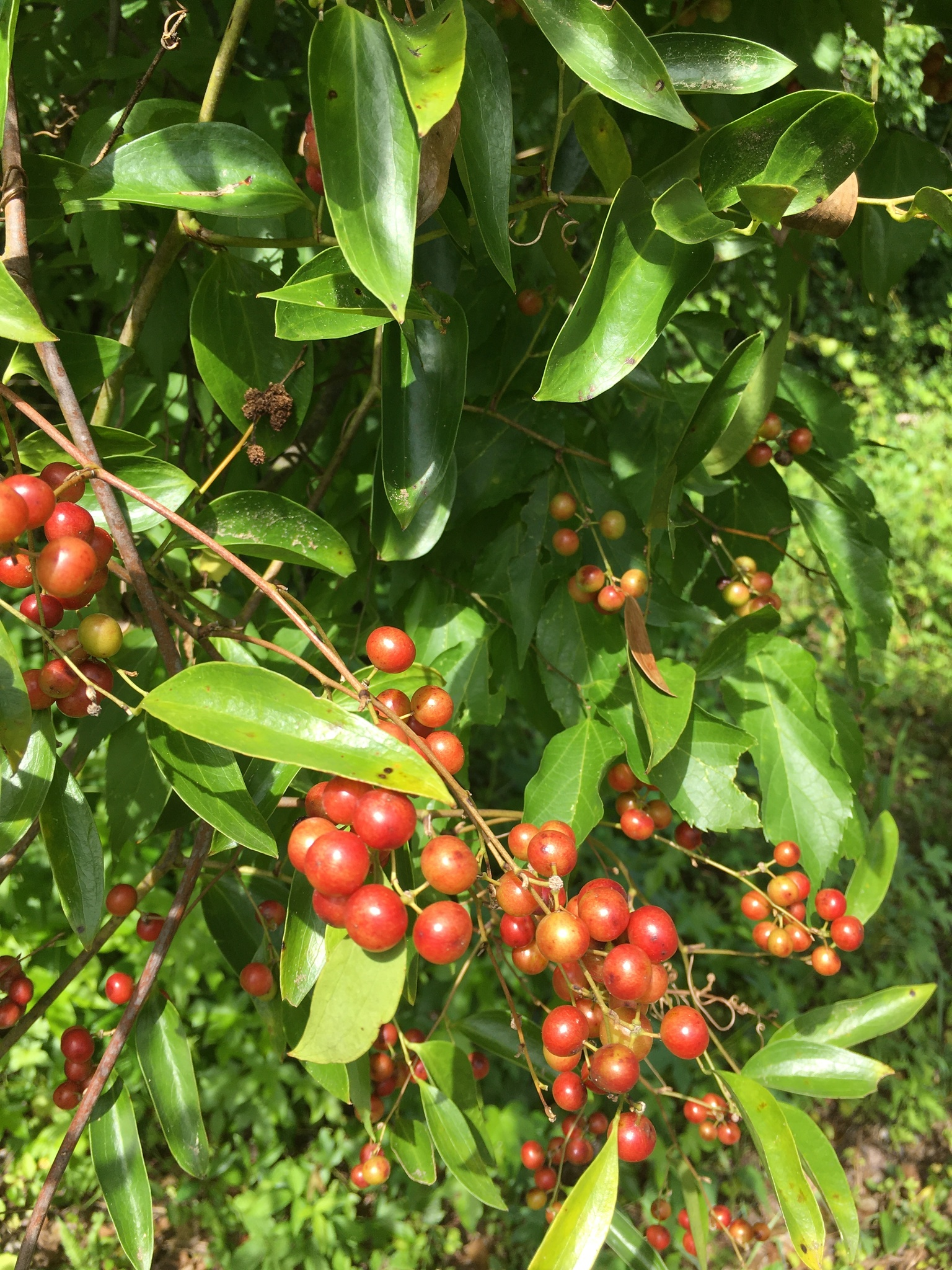

Scientific classification
- Kingdom: Plantae
- Clade: Tracheophytes
- Clade: Angiosperms
- Clade: Monocots
- Order: Liliales
- Family: Smilacaceae
- Genus: Smilax
- Species: S. maritima

Binomial name
- Smilax maritima Feay ex Alph.Wood 1861 not Hatus. 1951

Synonyms
- Smilax smallii Morong; Smilax cinnamomifolia Small; Smilax ovata Pursh 1813 not Duhamel 1803; Smilax ovata var. buckleyi A.DC.

= Smilax maritima =

Species of flowering plant

Smilax maritima is a North American species of plants native to the south-eastern United States from Texas to North Carolina.

== Description ==
Smilax maritima is a branching vine up to 150 cm (60 inches) tall. Berries are black with a waxy coating. S. maritima's leaves are small, shiny, and light-green in color.

== Distribution and habitat ==
This species is found primarily within the United States' Coastal Plain region, stretching from Virginia to peninsular Florida, and westward to Texas. It has also been observed in Puerto Rico.

S. maritima occurs in habitat types such as in longleaf pine forests, river floodplains, and mesic wooded areas. It has also been observed in disturbed or previously disturbed habitats such as along roadsides and in burned savannas.
