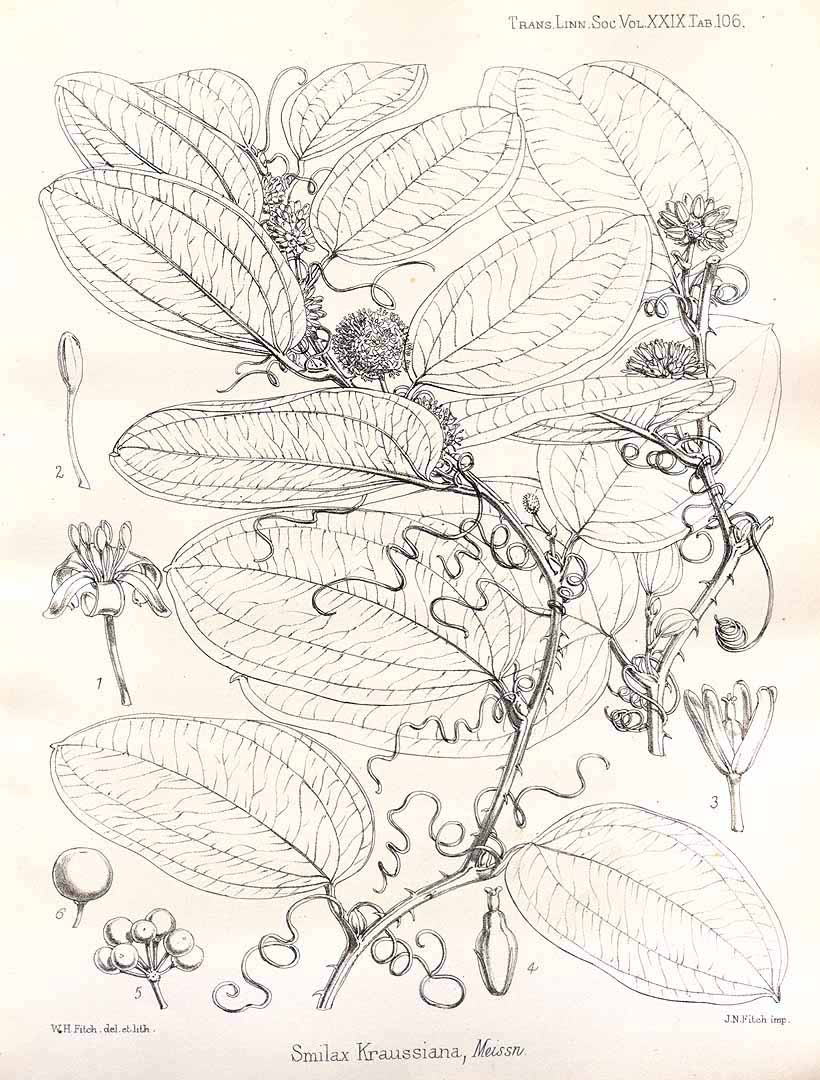
- 1875 illustration

Scientific classification
- Kingdom: Plantae
- Clade: Tracheophytes
- Clade: Angiosperms
- Clade: Monocots
- Order: Liliales
- Family: Smilacaceae
- Genus: Smilax
- Species: S. anceps

Binomial name
- Smilax anceps Willd.

Synonyms
- Smilax herbacea Thunb. (1808); S. semiamplexicaulis Bojer (1837); S. kraussiana Meisn. (1845); S. morsaniana Kunth (1850); S. mossambicensis Garcke (1864); S. goudotiana DC. (1874); S. telfaireana DC. (1874); S. cynodon Cordem. (1895)

= Smilax anceps =

Species of shrub

Smilax anceps is a vigorous scrambling vine or shrub, and is one of some 278 species in the genus Smilax in the family Smilacaceae. The species is widespread in Tropical Africa, Southern Africa, Réunion, Mauritius, Comoros, and Madagascar. The specific name 'anceps' is Latin for 'dangerous', a caution against the hooked prickles. Tarundia cinctipennis Stål, 1862, a hemipteran insect, is associated with this plant.

It has tough, fibrous stems up to 5 m long, armed with numerous hooked prickles and pairs of coiled tendrils at the leaf petiole bases. Leaves are entire, alternate, ovate to elliptic to somewhat circular, 4–14 cm long, with a leathery texture. Petioles are 0.5-2.5 cm long, thickened, and channeled above. Inflorescences are many-flowered axillary, globose umbels, with peduncles some 3 cm long and 2 ovate bracts near the middle, and some 5 mm long. Flowers in the same inflorescence are unisexual, with perianth segments 3–5 mm long, recurved, greenish-white, yellowish or brownish. The fruit is a globose berry, 8–10 mm in diameter, turning from red to purplish to black when ripe, slightly sweet and acidulous.

This species was first described and published in 1806 by Carl Ludwig von Willdenow, the early German phytogeographer in "Species Plantarum" Editio Quarto 4: 782.

== Gallery ==
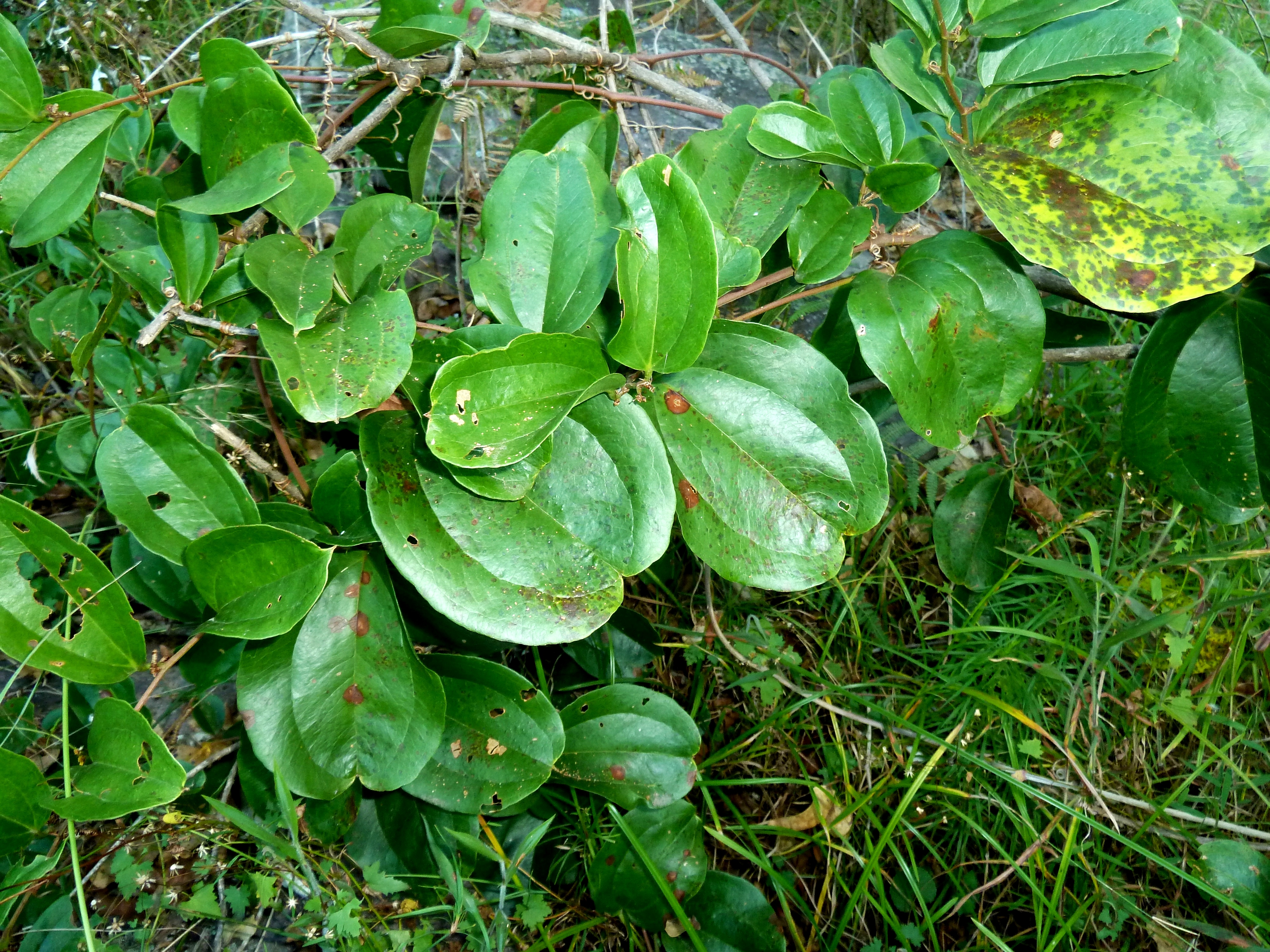

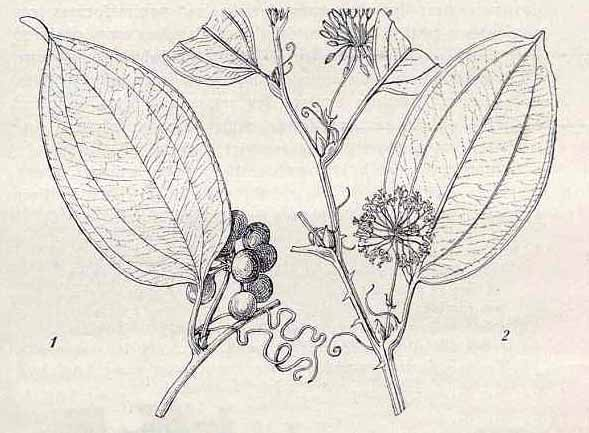
