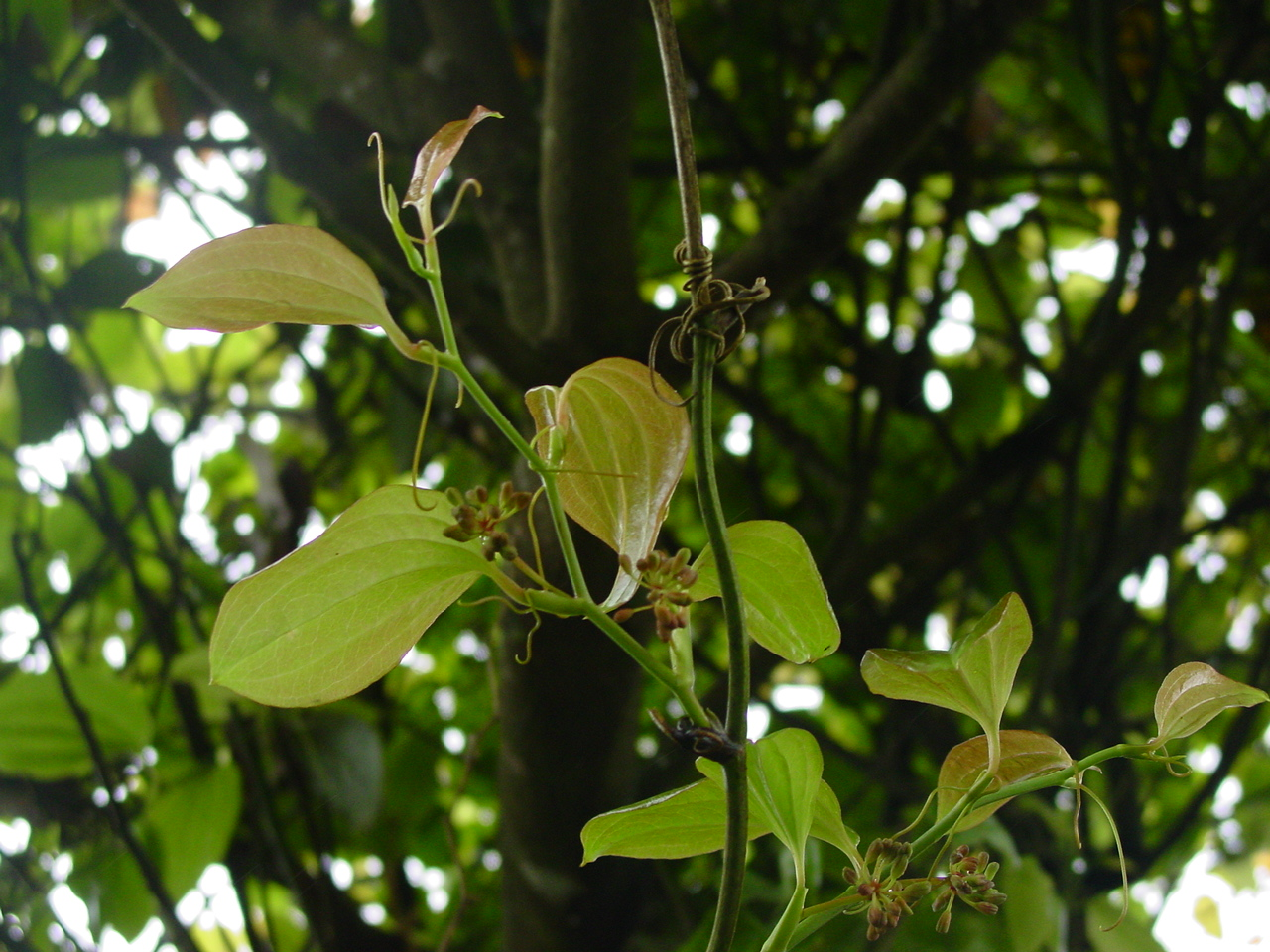
- Smilax azorica

Scientific classification
- Kingdom: Plantae
- Clade: Tracheophytes
- Clade: Angiosperms
- Clade: Monocots
- Order: Liliales
- Family: Smilacaceae
- Genus: Smilax
- Species: S. azorica

Binomial name
- Smilax azorica H.Schaef. & P.Schoenfelder (2009)

Synonyms
- Smilax divaricata Sol. ex H.C.Watson

= Smilax azorica =

Species of flowering plant

Smilax azorica is a species of flowering plants of the Smilacaceae family. The species is endemic to the Azores. It was first described in 1844 as Smilax divaricata, a name that had already been given to another species. It was renamed Smilax azorica in 2009.

== Description ==
The species is a climbing wintergreen plant. It has few or no thorns. Its leaves are ovate or cordate, almost as broad as long. The flowers are unisexual, in a simple umbel. Its fruits are red when ripe.
