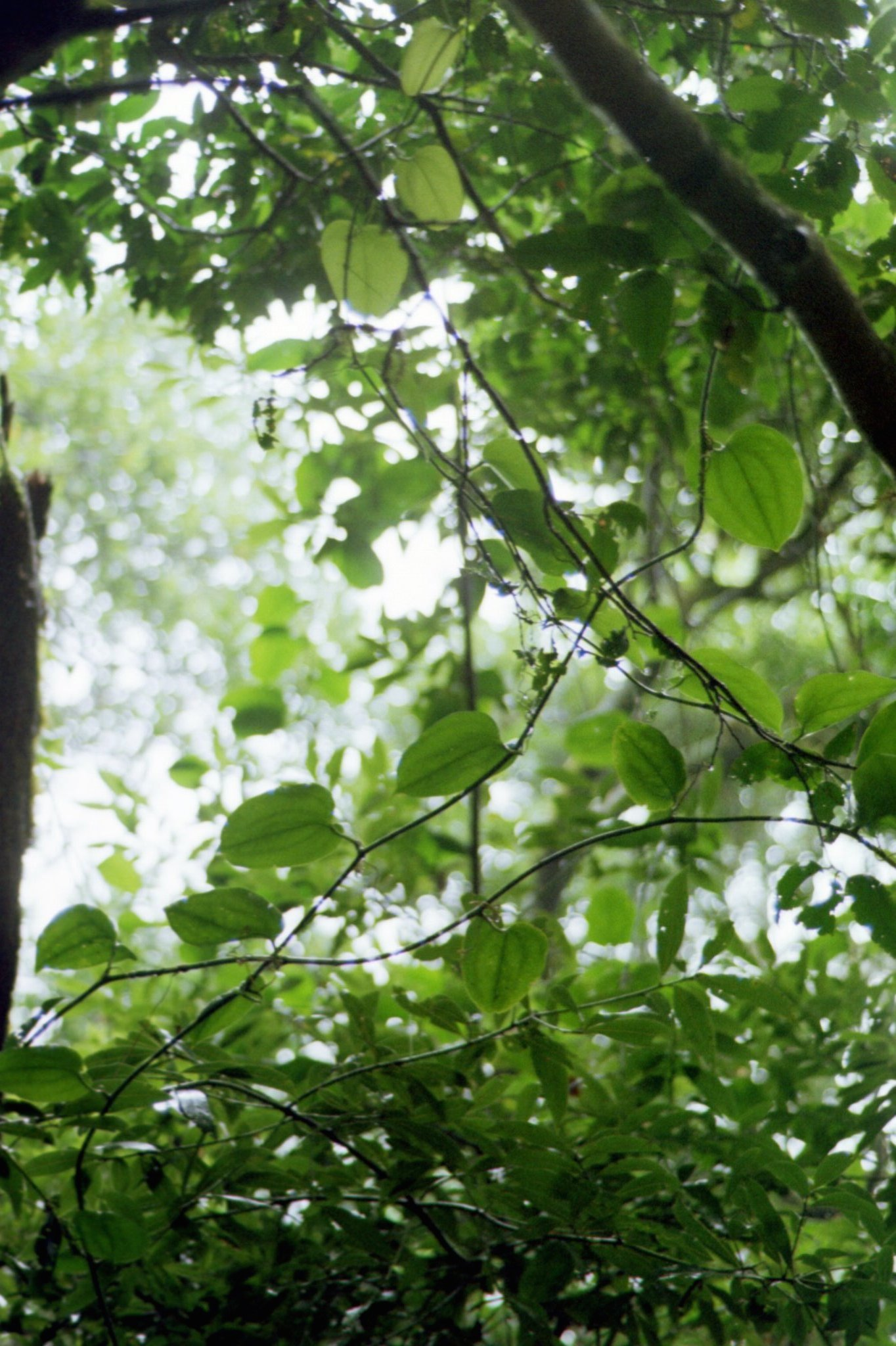
- Smilax canariensis

Scientific classification
- Kingdom: Plantae
- Clade: Tracheophytes
- Clade: Angiosperms
- Clade: Monocots
- Order: Liliales
- Family: Smilacaceae
- Genus: Smilax
- Species: S. canariensis

Binomial name
- Smilax canariensis Willd, 1806

= Smilax canariensis =

Species of flowering plant

Smilax canariensis is a species of flowering plants of the Smilacaceae family. It occurs in Madeira and the Canary Islands. The species was first described by Carl Ludwig Willdenow in 1806. Its Spanish name is zarzaparrilla canaria.

== Description ==
The species is a climbing wintergreen plant. It has few or no thorns. The width to length ratio of its leaves is about 0.6. The flowers are unisexual, in a simple umbel. Its fruits are black when ripe.
