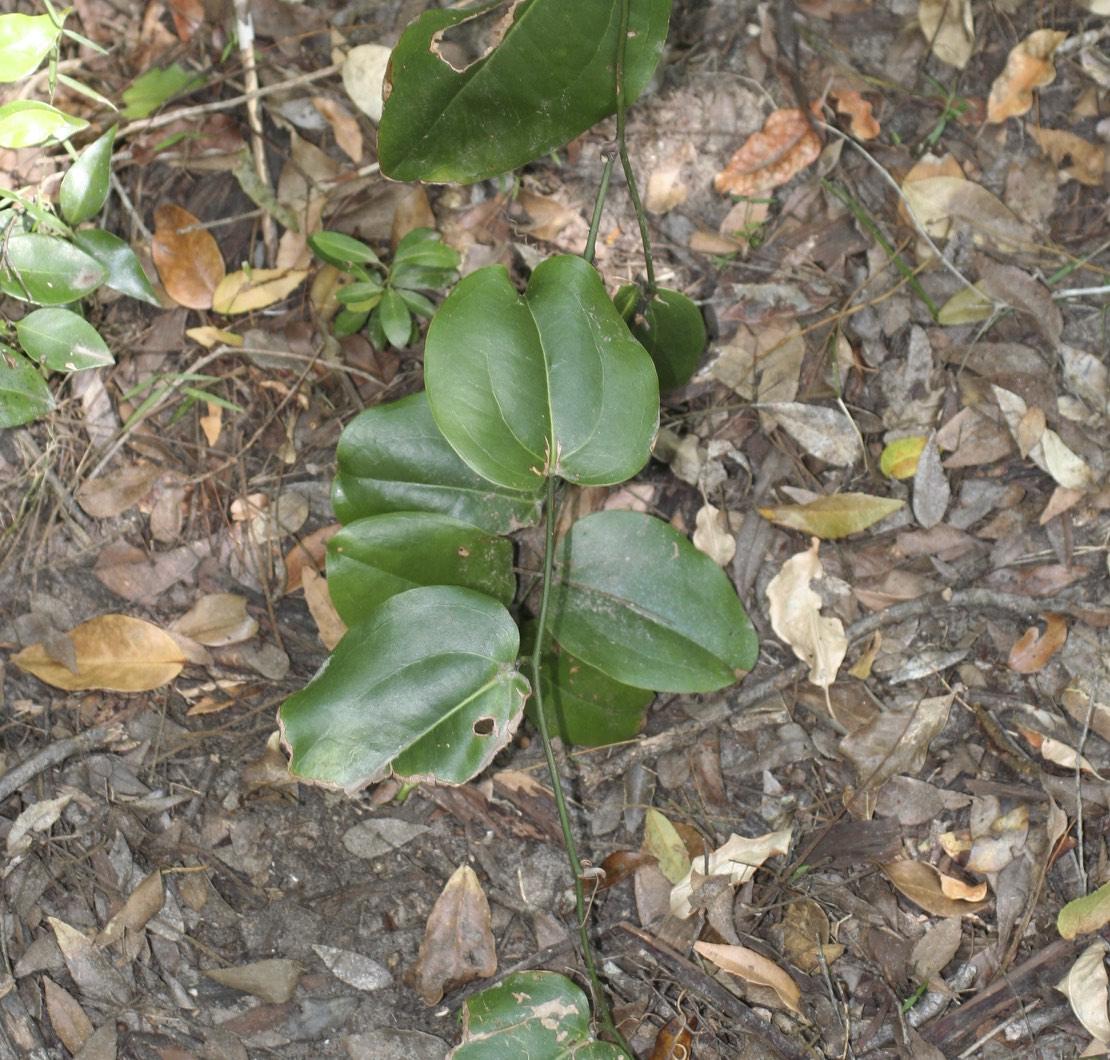

Scientific classification
- Kingdom: Plantae
- Clade: Embryophytes
- Clade: Tracheophytes
- Clade: Spermatophytes
- Clade: Angiosperms
- Clade: Monocots
- Order: Liliales
- Family: Smilacaceae
- Genus: Smilax
- Species: S. calophylla

Binomial name
- Smilax calophylla Wall. ex A.DC.

= Smilax calophylla =

Species of flowering plant

Smilax calophylla is a vine in the greenbrier family. It is native to parts of Southeast Asia (southern Thailand, Peninsular Malaysia, Singapore, Sumatra) as well as to northeastern Australia (Queensland).

Smilax calophylla is an erect to declining herb up to 2.5 m tall, with yellow flowers and reddish-brown fruits. Tea brewed from the leaves is used as a male aphrodisiac in Malaysia.
