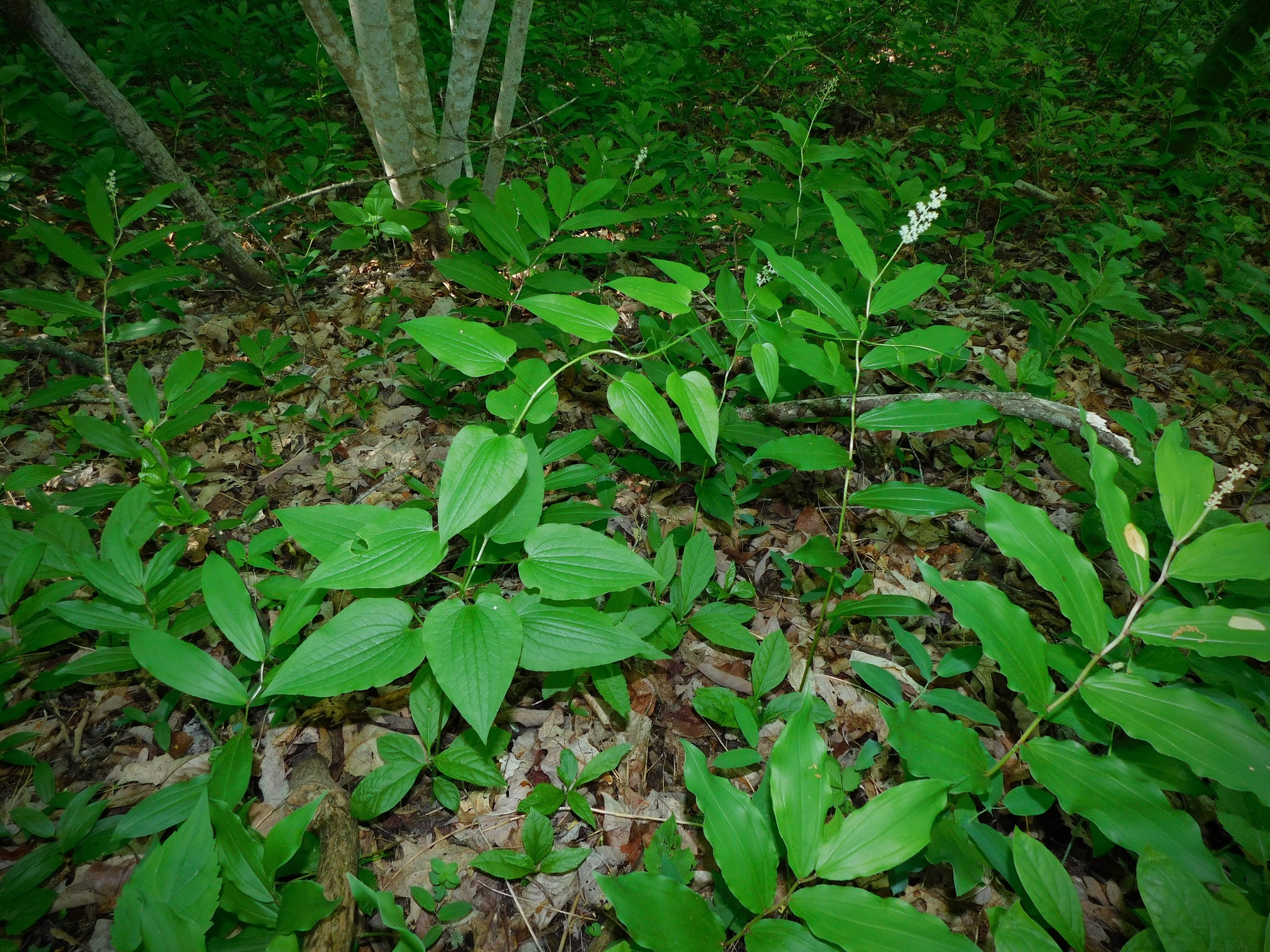

Conservation status
- Apparently Secure (NatureServe)

Scientific classification
- Kingdom: Plantae
- Clade: Tracheophytes
- Clade: Angiosperms
- Clade: Monocots
- Order: Liliales
- Family: Smilacaceae
- Genus: Smilax
- Species: S. pulverulenta

Binomial name
- Smilax pulverulenta Michx.

Synonyms
- Smilax herbacea var. pulverulenta (Michx.) A.Gray; Nemexia pulverulenta (Michx.) Small

= Smilax pulverulenta =

Species of flowering plant

Smilax pulverulenta, the downy carrionflower, is a North American species of plants native to the eastern and central United States. The plant is fairly common in the Ozarks, the Appalachians, and the Mid-Atlantic States, with isolated populations in Rhode Island, Minnesota, and Nebraska.

== Description ==
Smilax pulverulenta is a climbing vine up to 250 cm (100 inches) tall, without prickles. Flowers are small and green; fruits dark blue to black, without the waxy coating common on other species in the genus.
