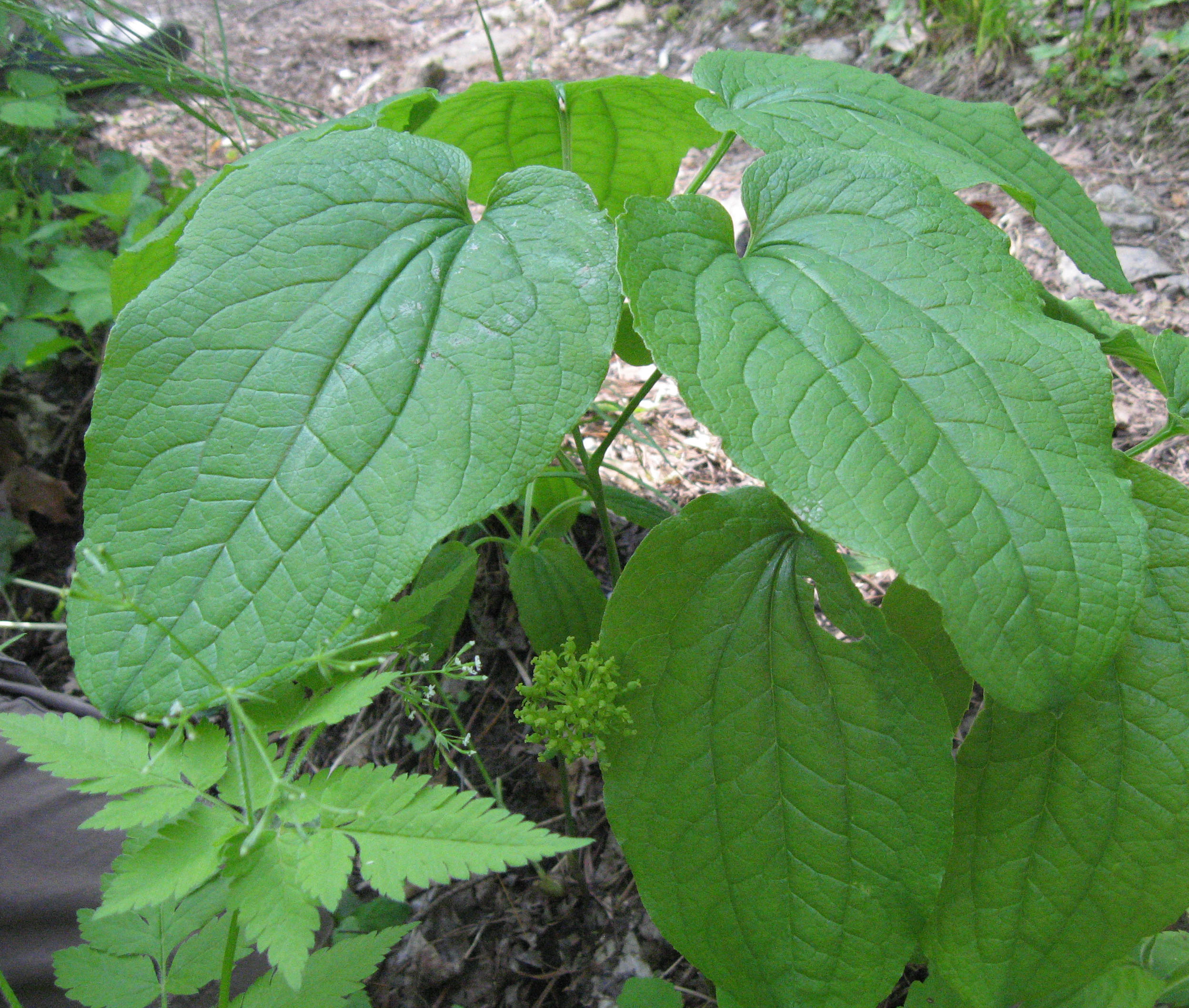

Scientific classification
- Kingdom: Plantae
- Clade: Tracheophytes
- Clade: Angiosperms
- Clade: Monocots
- Order: Liliales
- Family: Smilacaceae
- Genus: Smilax
- Species: S. ecirrhata

Binomial name
- Smilax ecirrhata (Engelm. ex Kunth) S. Watson

Synonyms
- Coprosmanthus herbaceus var. ecirratus Engelm. ex Kunth; Smilax herbacea var. ecirrata (Engelm. ex Kunth) A.Gray ex A.DC.; Coprosmanthus ecirrhatus (Engelm. ex Kunth) Chapm.; Nemexia ecirrhata (Engelm. ex Kunth) Small

= Smilax ecirrhata =

Species of flowering plant

Smilax ecirrhata, the upright carrionflower, is a species of flowering plant in the greenbriar family. It is native to Ontario and to the central United States (Great Lakes Region and Mississippi/Ohio/Missouri Valley). It is found in rich, calcareous forests along floodplains. It is an herbaceous plant that has green umbels of flowers in late spring.
