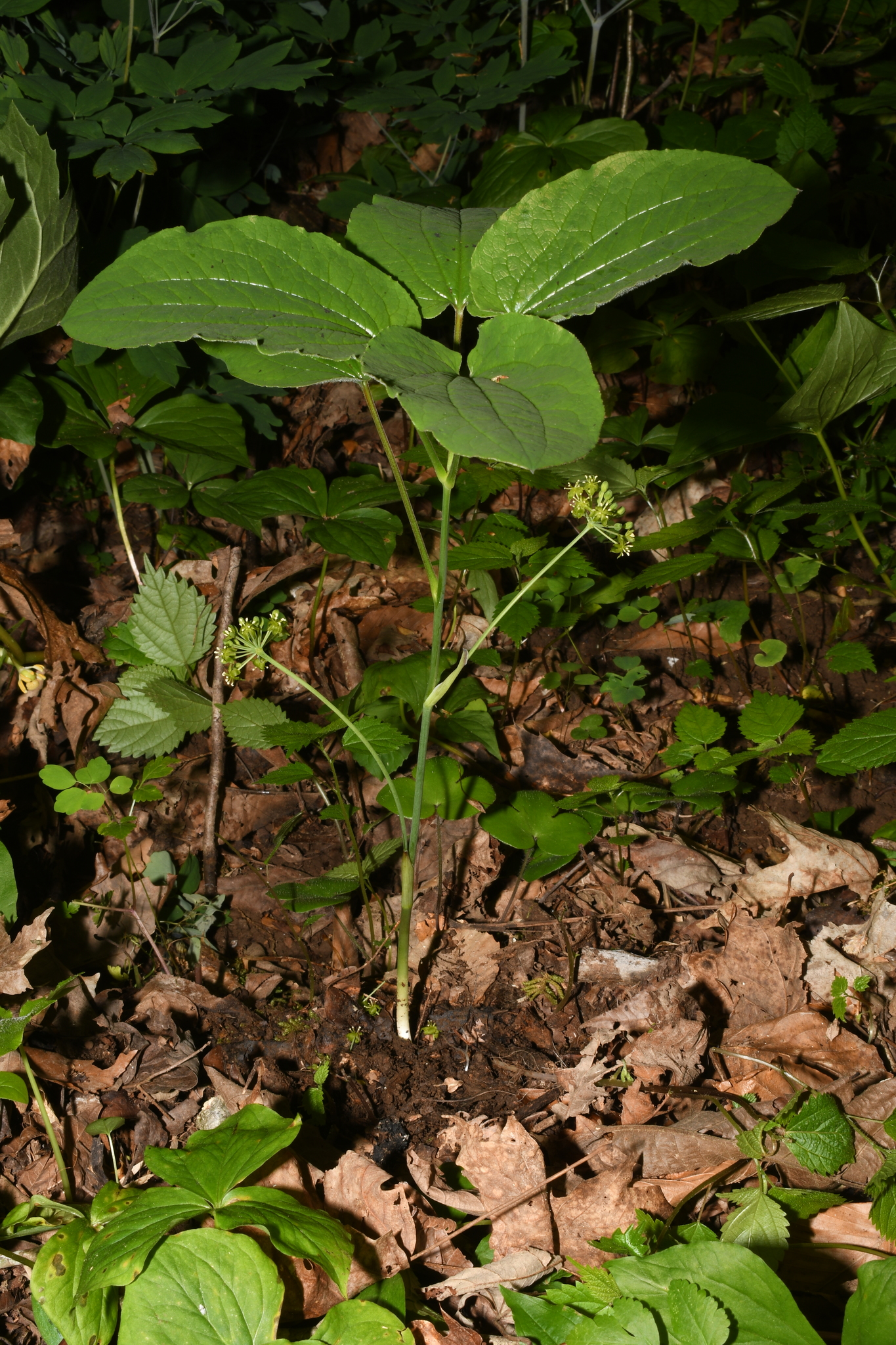

Scientific classification
- Kingdom: Plantae
- Clade: Tracheophytes
- Clade: Angiosperms
- Clade: Monocots
- Order: Liliales
- Family: Smilacaceae
- Genus: Smilax
- Species: S. hugeri

Binomial name
- Smilax hugeri (Small) J.B.Norton ex Pennell

Synonyms
- Nemexia hugeri Small; Nemexia elliptica Raf.; Smilax ecirrhata var. hugeri (Small) H.E.Ahles

= Smilax hugeri =

Species of flowering plant

Smilax hugeri, common name Huger's carrionflower, is a North American plant species native to the south-eastern United States. It is found in Mississippi, Alabama, Georgia, Florida, Tennessee, and North and South Carolina.

== Description ==
Smilax hugeri is erect herb up to 5 m (15 feet) tall, without spines. Flowers are small and green; berries round and covered with wax.
