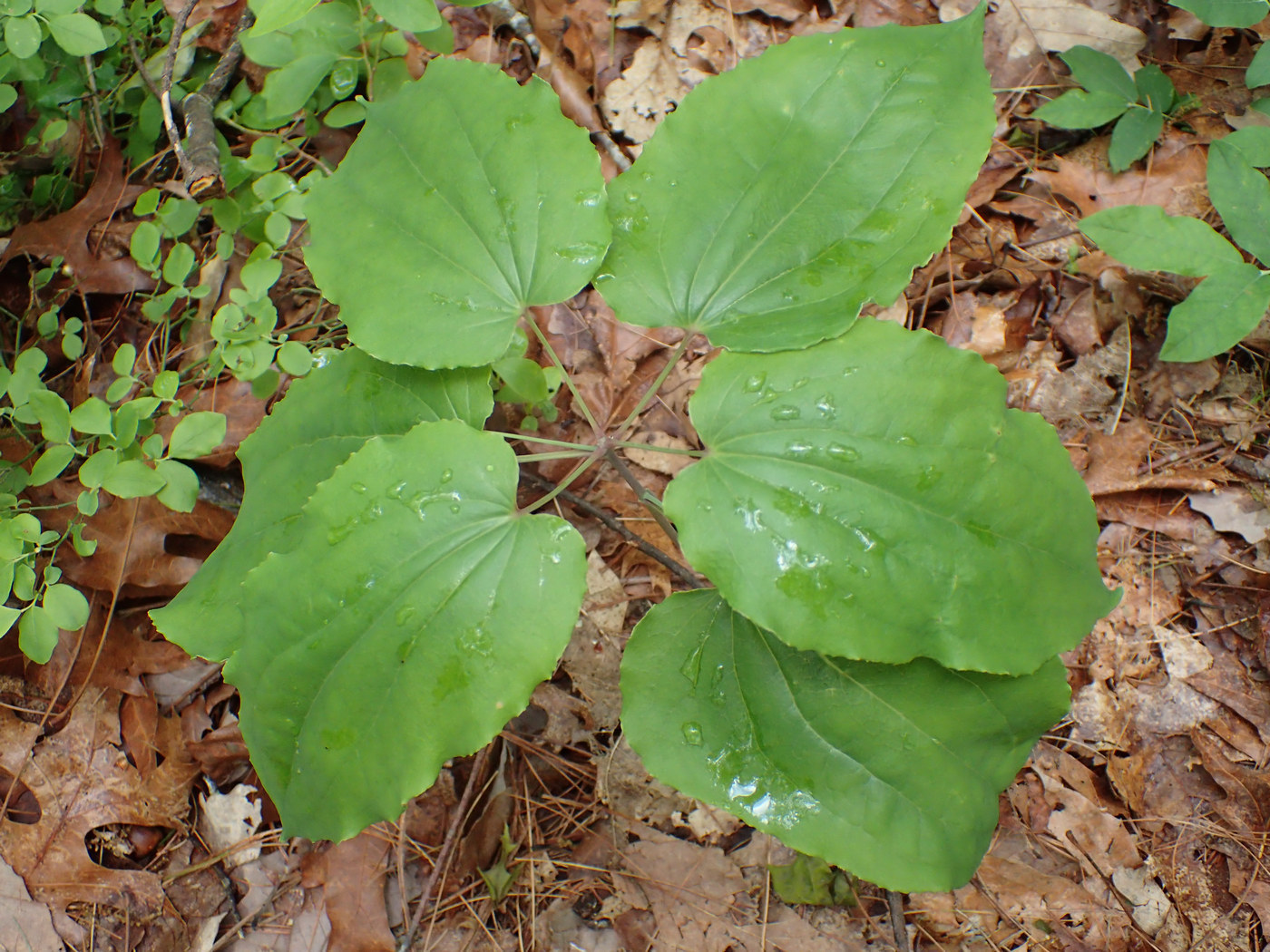

Conservation status
- Apparently Secure (NatureServe)

Scientific classification
- Kingdom: Plantae
- Clade: Tracheophytes
- Clade: Angiosperms
- Clade: Monocots
- Order: Liliales
- Family: Smilacaceae
- Genus: Smilax
- Species: S. biltmoreana

Binomial name
- Smilax biltmoreana (Small) J.B.Norton ex Pennell

Synonyms
- Nemexia biltmoreana Small; Smilax ecirrhata var. biltmoreana (Small) H.E.Ahles; Smilax ecirrata var. biltmoreana (Small) H.E.Ahles, alternate spelling

= Smilax biltmoreana =

Species of flowering plant

Smilax biltmoreana, common name Biltmore's carrionflower, is a North American plant species native to the south-eastern United States. It is concentrated in the Great Smoky Mountains but with outlying populations in Virginia, North and South Carolina, Tennessee, Kentucky, Georgia, Alabama, and northern Florida.

== Taxonomy ==
The species epithet biltmoreana refers to the Biltmore Estate in Asheville, North Carolina, once owned by George Washington Vanderbilt. Vanderbilt sponsored a significant number of botanical studies in the American Southeast in the late 19th and early 20th Centuries.

== Description ==
Smilax biltmoreana is a herb with erect stems up to 60 cm (2 feet) tall. Leaves are egg-shaped to heart-shaped, with wax on the underside but no hairs. Flowers are small and greenish, fruits dark blue.
