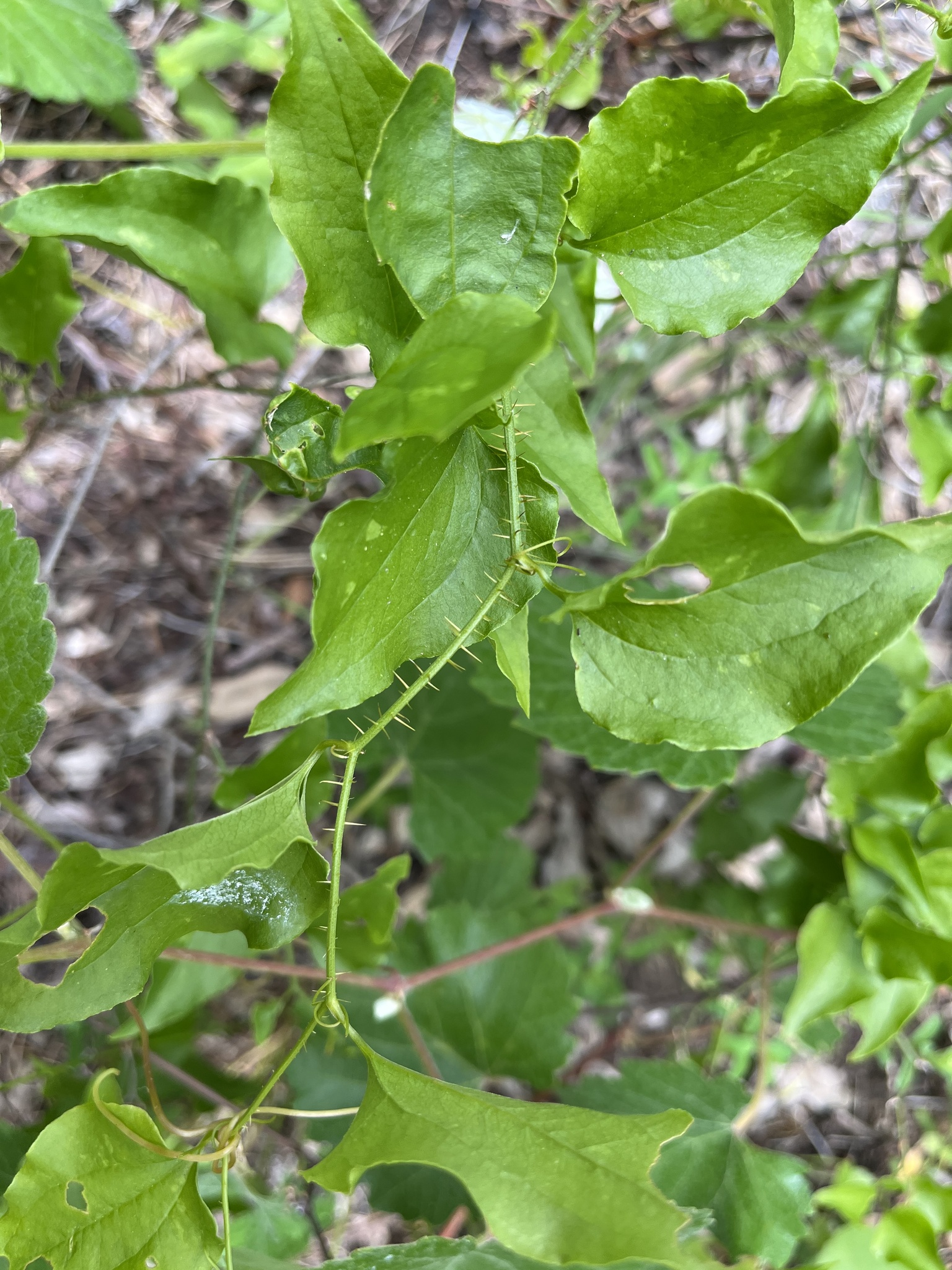
- Shasta County, California, 2022

Scientific classification
- Kingdom: Plantae
- Clade: Tracheophytes
- Clade: Angiosperms
- Clade: Monocots
- Order: Liliales
- Family: Smilacaceae
- Genus: Smilax
- Species: S. californica

Binomial name
- Smilax californica (A.DC.) A.Gray

Synonyms
- Smilax rotundifolia var. californica A.DC.

= Smilax californica =

Species of woody vine

Smilax californica, the California greenbriar, is a common woody vine native to the western United States.

== Description ==
The leaves are dull green, petioled, alternate, and circular to heart-shaped. They are generally 5–10 centimetres (2–4 in) long. The stems are round, green and have sharp spines.

The plant is monoecious, with drooping flowers in leaf axils. The berry is black and roundish.

== Distribution and habitat ==
The plant is native to northern California and southwestern Oregon. It can be found near streambanks and mixed forests below 1,500 metres (5,000 ft) in elevation.
