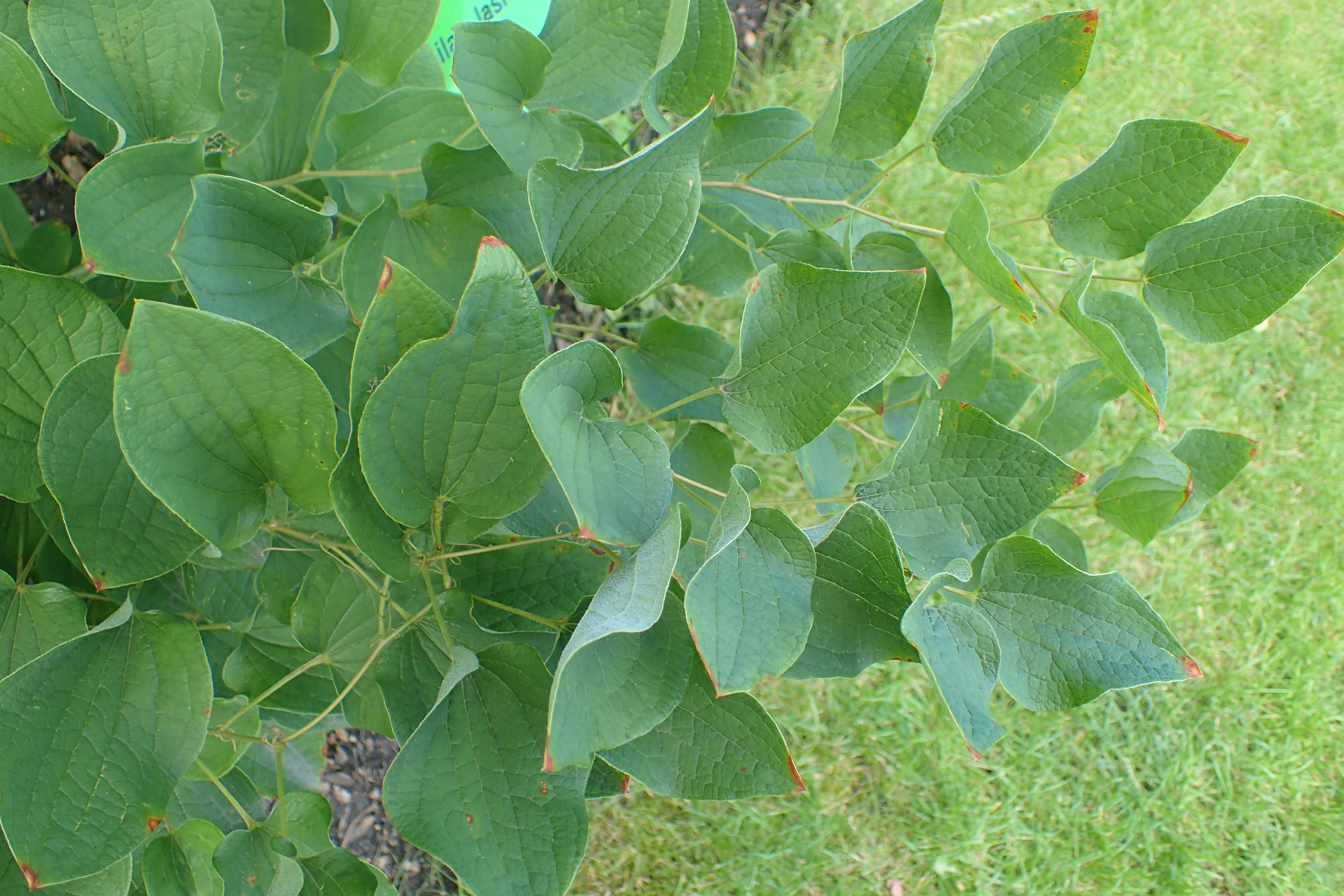

Scientific classification
- Kingdom: Plantae
- Clade: Tracheophytes
- Clade: Angiosperms
- Clade: Monocots
- Order: Liliales
- Family: Smilacaceae
- Genus: Smilax
- Species: S. lasioneura

Binomial name
- Smilax lasioneura Hook.

Synonyms
- Synonymy: Smilax lasioneuron Hook.; Coprosmanthus lasioneuron (Hook.) Kunth; Nemexia lasioneura (Hook.) Rydb.; Smilax diversifolia Small; Smilax tenuis Small; Nemexia diversifolia (Small) Small; Nemexia tenuis (Small) Small; Nemexia melica A.Nelson

= Smilax lasioneura =

Species of flowering plant

Smilax lasioneura, the Blue Ridge carrionflower, is a North American species of flowering plants in the greenbriar family. It is widespread across central Canada and the central United States, from Ontario, Manitoba and Saskatchewan south to Texas, Louisiana, and Florida.

Smilax lasioneura is an erect, branching herb up to 250 cm (5 feet) tall. Flowers are small but numerous, in umbels of many flowers. Berries are round, blue to almost black.
