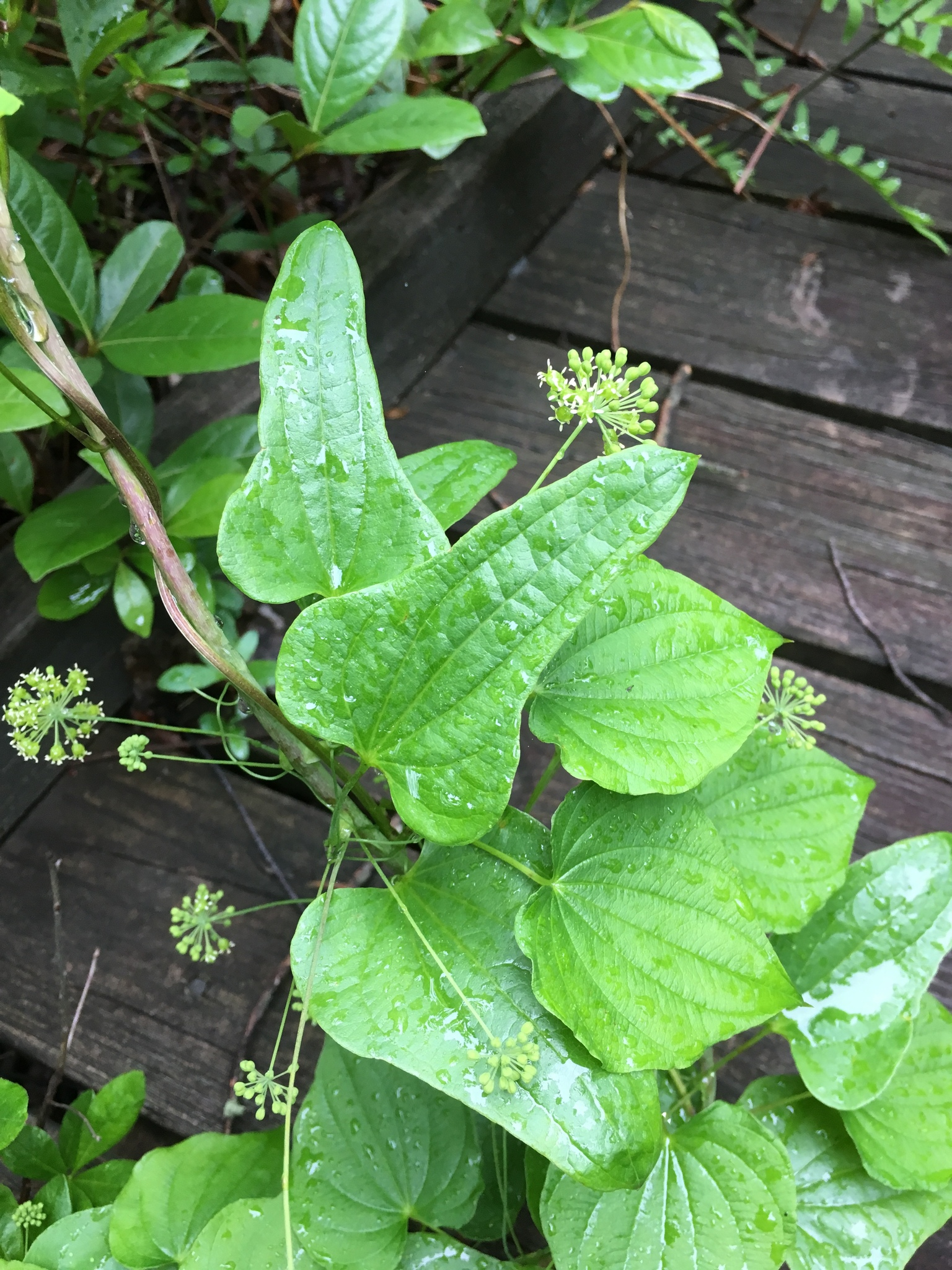

Conservation status
- Apparently Secure (NatureServe)

Scientific classification
- Kingdom: Plantae
- Clade: Tracheophytes
- Clade: Angiosperms
- Clade: Monocots
- Order: Liliales
- Family: Smilacaceae
- Genus: Smilax
- Species: S. pseudochina

Binomial name
- Smilax pseudochina L. not Lour. 1790 nor M.Martens & Galeotti ex A.DC. 1878 nor Blanco 1837 nor Herb.Madr. ex Wall. 1831 nor Roxb. 1832 nor Sieber ex A.DC. 1878 nor Bert. ex Kunth 1850
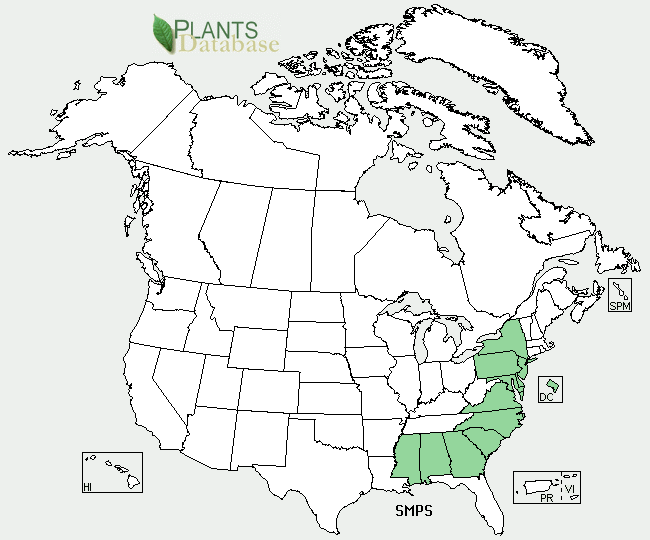
- Range within North America

Synonyms
- Synonymy: Smilax pseudo-china L.; Smilax hederifolia Mill. 1768 not Beyr. ex Kunth 1850; Smilax inermis Walter; Smilax tamnifolia Michx.; Smilax farinosa Raf.; Smilax pandurata Raf. 1840, not Pursh 1813; Coprosmanthus tamnifolius (Michx.) Kunth; Nemexia tamnifolia (Michx.) Small; Smilax leptanthera Pennell; Nemexia leptanthera (Pennell) Small

= Smilax pseudochina =

Species of herb

Smilax pseudochina is a perennial species of herb in the greenbriar family. It is commonly called bamboo vine or false chinaroot. Its range extends up the Atlantic Coast of the United States, from Long Island in New York State south to Georgia.

== Description ==
Smilax pseudochina is a climbing herbaceous vine which grows up to 2 meters (7 feet) tall, the thornless stems only live one year but will regrow the next. The stems have numerous tendrils which twist around objects and help the plant climb. The leaves are glabrous and triangular to oval (ovate) shaped and may almost be hastate at the base and range from 5–12 cm long to 2–5 cm wide. The leaf edges are often straight or almost concave, this helps distinguish it from other Smilax spp. which typically have convex edges on the leaves. The stem is sometimes unbranched but may have a few branches. The flowers are dioecious and greenish with 6 tepals. The flowers open in June and the berries mature in September. The berries are round, blue or black with a waxy coat and borne on long umbels axially from the upper leaves; these umbels contain from 10-35 flowers or fruits.

False chinaroot grows in dry to moist habitats, ranging from bogs, marshes, wet woods to dry woods, and dry to damp sandy thickets

== Endangered status ==
False chinaroot is listed as extirpated in Pennsylvania, endangered in New York, and threatened in Maryland.

== Uses ==
The Cherokees of North America would make fritters from the plant's fresh, macerated tuberous roots. After the roots had been ground and soaked in water, the water was decanted, and the root mash, after leaving it out to dry, was mixed with fine corn meal, made into a dough-like batter and then deep-fried in animal fat.

== See also ==
- Chinaroot
