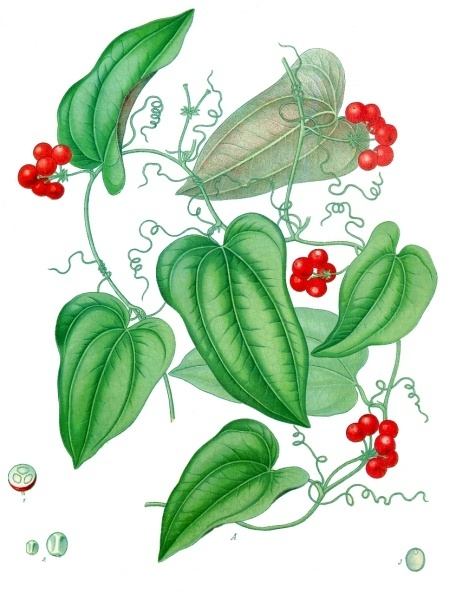
- Smilax aristolochiifolia

Scientific classification
- Kingdom: Plantae
- Clade: Tracheophytes
- Clade: Angiosperms
- Clade: Monocots
- Order: Liliales
- Family: Smilacaceae; Vent.

Genera
- †Majanthemophyllum; Smilax (incl. Heterosmilax)

= Smilacaceae =

Smilacaceae Temporal range: 55–0 Ma Early Paleogene - Recent

Family of flowering plants

Smilacaceae, the greenbriers, is a family of flowering plants. While they were often assigned to a more broadly defined family Liliaceae, most recent botanists have accepted the two as distinct families, diverging around 55 million years ago during the Early Paleogene. One characteristic that distinguishes Smilacaceae from most of the other members of the Liliaceae-like Liliales is that it has true vessels in its conducting tissue. Another is that the veins of the leaves, between major veins, are reticulate (net-shaped), rather than parallel as in most monocots.

== Taxonomy ==
The APG II system, of 2003 (unchanged from the APG system, of 1998), recognizes this family and places it in the order Liliales, in the clade monocots. Earlier it was a family of two genera, Heterosmilax and Smilax, but DNA studies have shown that Heterosmilax has arisen from Smilax and the two genera are now merged. This results in Smilax being the only genus in Smilacaceae with about 210 known species. The family occurs throughout the tropical and warm temperate regions of the world. Members of this family typically have woody roots and a climbing or vining form. Some have woody vining stems, often with thorns, while others are herbaceous above ground and thornless.

Other placements of the family include:

- The Cronquist system, of 1981, recognized this family and placed it in the order Liliales, in subclass Liliidae in class Liliopsida [=monocotyledons] of division Magnoliophyta [=angiosperms].
- The Reveal system (1997) recognized this family and placed it in the order Smilacales, in subclass Liliidae which is placed as in the Cronquist system.
- The Thorne system (1992) also recognized this family, and placed it in the order Dioscoreales in superorder Lilianae in subclass Liliidae (monocotyledons) of class Magnoliopsida (angiosperms).
- The Dahlgren system treated it as did the Thorne system (1992): see above.

== Characteristics ==
Members of this family can be herbaceous to "woody" vines. They grow from their rhizomes and are often armed with prickles on the stems and/or leaves. Leaves are alternate and simple; and entire to spinose-serrate. Some members of this family have coriaceous (leathery) leaves. Venation of the leaves may be palmate to reticulate. A pair of tendrils often appear near the base of the petiole. The inflorescence type for members of this family is an umbel. The flowers are inconspicuous, radial and unisexual. The flowers are made of 6 tepals, 6 stamens and 3 carpels. The fruit type of all members of Smilacaceae is a berry. The number of seeds per berry is 1–3. Nectaries are located at the base of the tepals.

== Genera ==
While both genera are dioecious and nearly indistinguishable vegetatively, their flowers differ markedly. The flower of Heterosmilax is fused into a deep bottle-shaped tube containing prominent nectaries and its stamens are connected at the bottom, whereas flowers of Smilax are typically small with unfused floral parts. Smilax is a much larger and more widely distributed genus than Heterosmilax. Heterosmilax has only twelve species which are confined to China, Japan, tropical Asia, Singapore, Malaysia, and the surrounding islands.

Some taxonomists separate the herbaceous plants native to North America in Smilax as the genus Nemexia, which is known for its malodorous flowers. Smilax would then be left with only plants of a woody, vining form with thorns. However, the Flora of North America does not recognise Nemexia, nor does the Missouri Botanical Garden's Angiosperm Phylogeny Website.

== Bibliography ==
- Qi, Zhechen; Cameron, Kenneth M.; Li, Pan; Zhao, Yunpeng; Chen, Shichao; Chen, Guangcun; Fu, Chengxin (December 2013). "Phylogenetics, character evolution, and distribution patterns of the greenbriers, Smilacaceae (Liliales), a near-cosmopolitan family of monocots". Botanical Journal of the Linnean Society. 173 (4): 535–548. doi:10.1111/boj.12096.
- Castner, James L. Photographic Atlas of Botany and Guide to Plant Identification. Feline Press. 2004. (ISBN 0-9625150-0-0)
- Smilacaceae in L. Watson and M.J. Dallwitz (1992 onwards). The families of flowering plants: descriptions, illustrations, identification, information retrieval. Version: 9 March 2006. http://delta-intkey.com.
- links at CSDL, Texas
