= List of lycaenid genera: Z =

The large butterfly family Lycaenidae contains the following genera starting with the letter Z:

- Zeltus
- Zeritis
- Zesius
- Zetona
- Ziegleria
- Zinaspa
- Zintha
- Zizeeria
- Zizina
- Zizula
