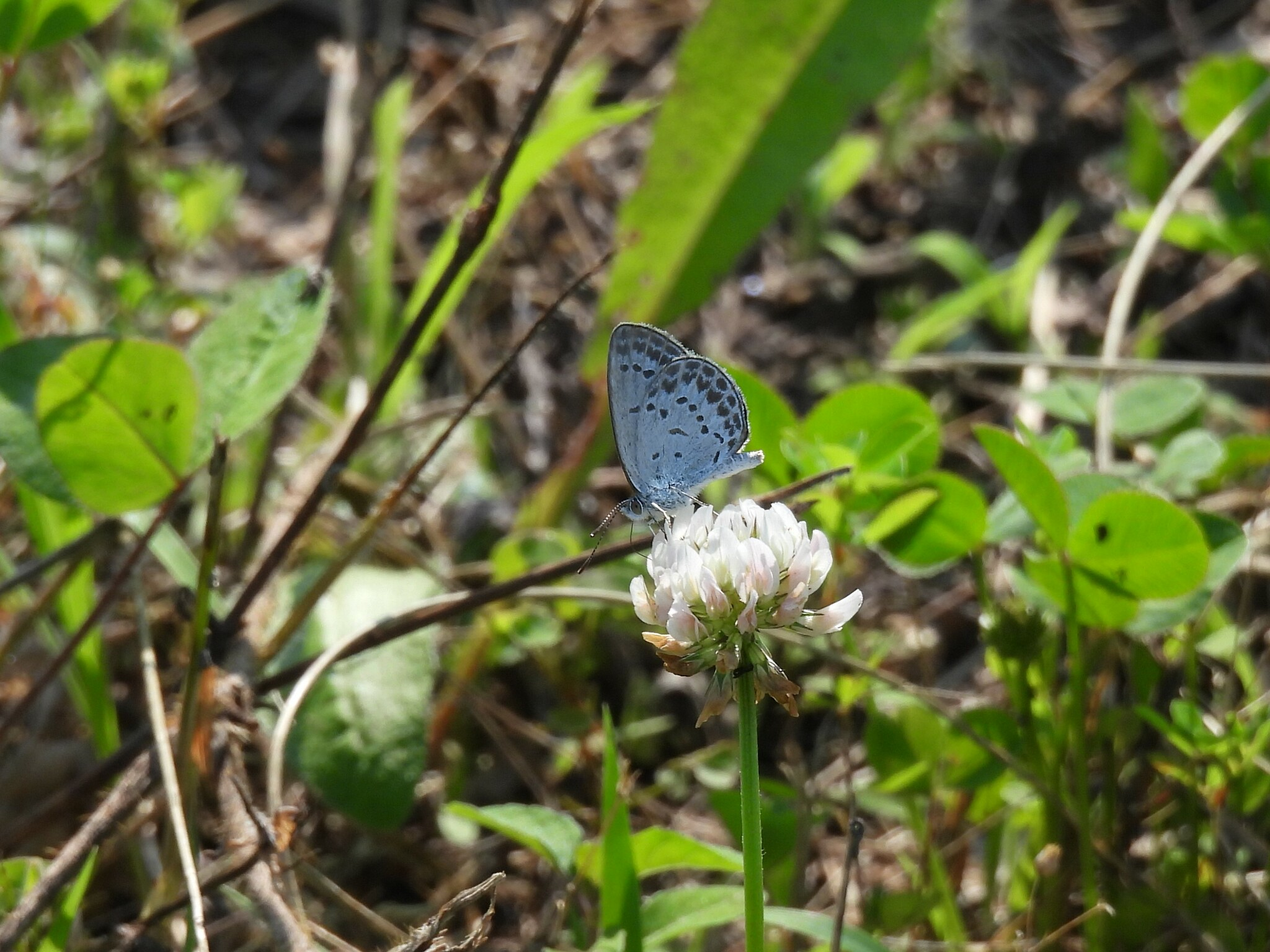
- Z. emelina on a white clover flower, one of its host plants. Taken 2023, Japan

Scientific classification
- Kingdom: Animalia
- Phylum: Arthropoda
- Class: Insecta
- Order: Lepidoptera
- Family: Lycaenidae
- Genus: Zizina
- Species: Z. emelina

Binomial name
- Zizina emelina de l'Orza, 1869

= Zizina emelina =

Species of butterfly

Zizina emelina (Z. emelina), formerly Zizina otis emelina, is a butterfly native to Japan and Korea. Sightings have also been made in the People's Republic of China (PRC) and reported via iNaturalist's community reporting features.

== Distribution ==
Z. emelina inhabits grasslands in early successional stages in Japan, Korea, and PRC. As a result of land use changes, reduced traditional grassland maintenance, and increased urbanization, their available habitats and their colonies have been reduced by more than half in the past century. Z. emelina feed on Lotus japonicus (L. japonicus) during their larval stage, a native plant which has suffered as a result of diminishing grassland frequency. However, white clover has been used to substitute L. japonicus, and it has become an important alternative as L. japonicus' frequency decreases.

== Endangered status ==
Z. emelina live in grasslands resulting from environmental disturbances while the ecosystem recovers. Their habitat and distribution coincide with traditional grassland maintenance, a practice which is being replaced with large-scale agriculture. As a result, the population of Z. emelina has dwindled to the point of becoming classified in Japan's Red List as 'Endangered'. In the past century, the forestry and agriculture industries have had significant detrimental impacts on the species as a result of regular deforestation and afforestation. Climate change may exacerbate the decline of Z. emelina, as hybridization induced by rapid climate change may lead to population extinctions. In Korea, Z. emelina is not considered endangered, however grassland butterflies are at particular risk in urbanized areas.

== Wolbachia ==
Wolbachia is a common endosymbiont among arthropods that causes reproductive alterations, male feminization, and other genetic alterations. Three strains infect Japanese Z. emelina populations: wEmeTn1, wEmeTn2, and WemeNy1. In Z. emelina, the wEmeTn1 and wEmeTn2 strains pose detrimental effects on reproduction and genetic structure. The Tn2 variant causes the death of males, and it causes females to only produce female offspring. Tn2 wolbachia has been observed in 9 distinct populations in Japan with an infection rate between 20% and 100%.

== Life cycle ==
Z. emelina have between five and seven generations annually. It is believed that short photoperiods trigger diapause in Z. emelina, and they experience progressive molts during this period. Temperature also has a direct impact on Z. emelina diapause, suggesting that global temperature increase may be a critical factor in the species' survival. Rapid environmental change is particularly dangerous for Z. emelina due to its multivoltine life cycle.
