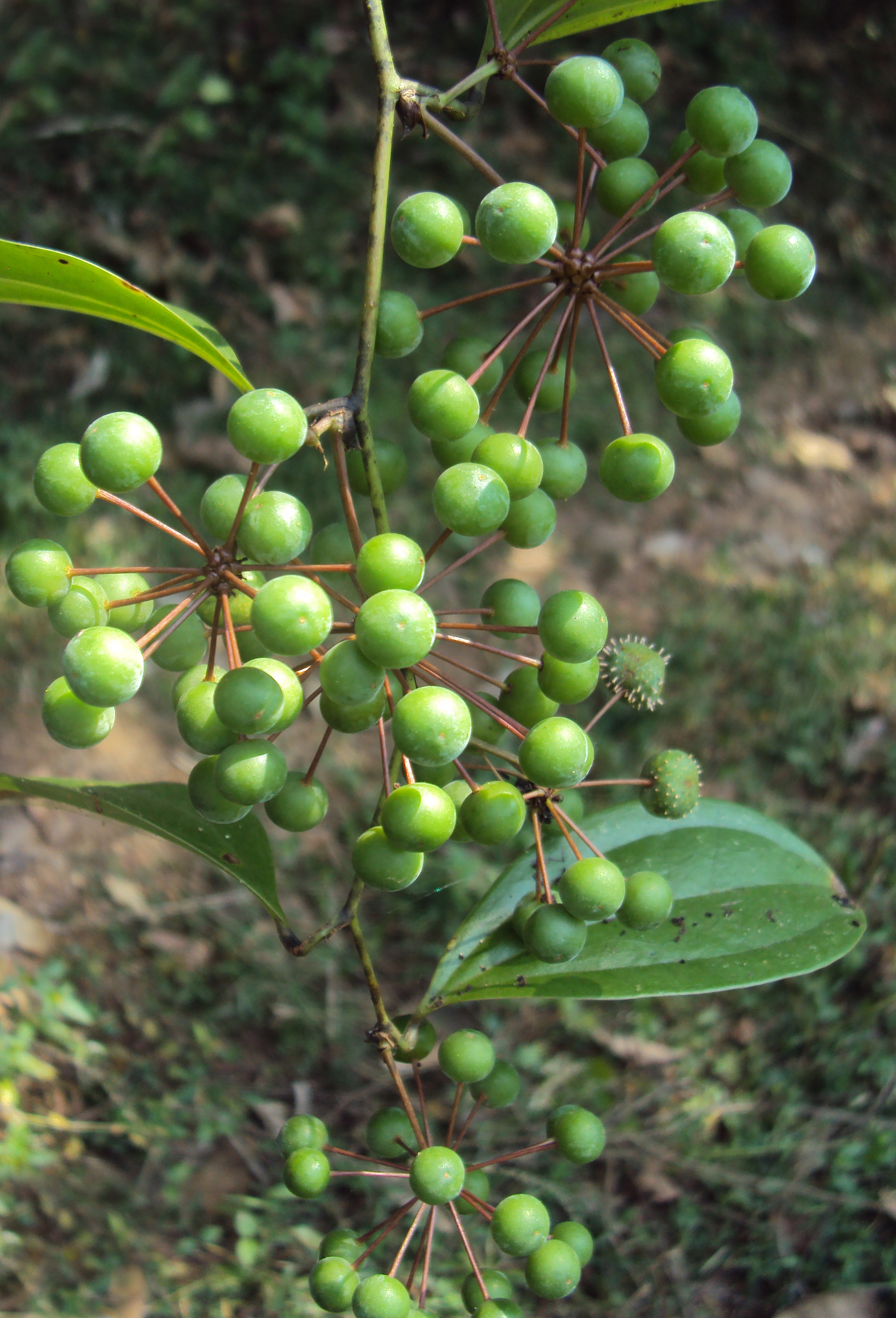
- Smilax zeylanica leaves and fruits

Scientific classification
- Kingdom: Plantae
- Clade: Tracheophytes
- Clade: Angiosperms
- Clade: Monocots
- Order: Liliales
- Family: Smilacaceae
- Genus: Smilax
- Species: S. zeylanica

Binomial name
- Smilax zeylanica L.

Synonyms
- Smilax ceylanica Oken; Smilax collina Kunth; Smilax elliptica Desv.; Smilax hohenackeri Kunth; Smilax indica Burm.f.; Smilax ovalifolia var. nervulosa A.DC.; Smilax villandia Buch.-Ham. ex Royle; Smilax zeylanica var. penangensis A.DC.; Smilax zollingeri Kunth

= Smilax zeylanica =

Species of flowering plant

Smilax zeylanica is a plant species in the genus Smilax. Its leaves and roots are used for medicinal purposes. The plant is widespread in India, and native in other parts of the Indian subcontinent as well as in Myanmar, Malaysia, Java and Solomon Islands. It is traditionally used for the treatment of ulcers. It is one of the larval host plants of the butterfly Zesius chrysomallus.
