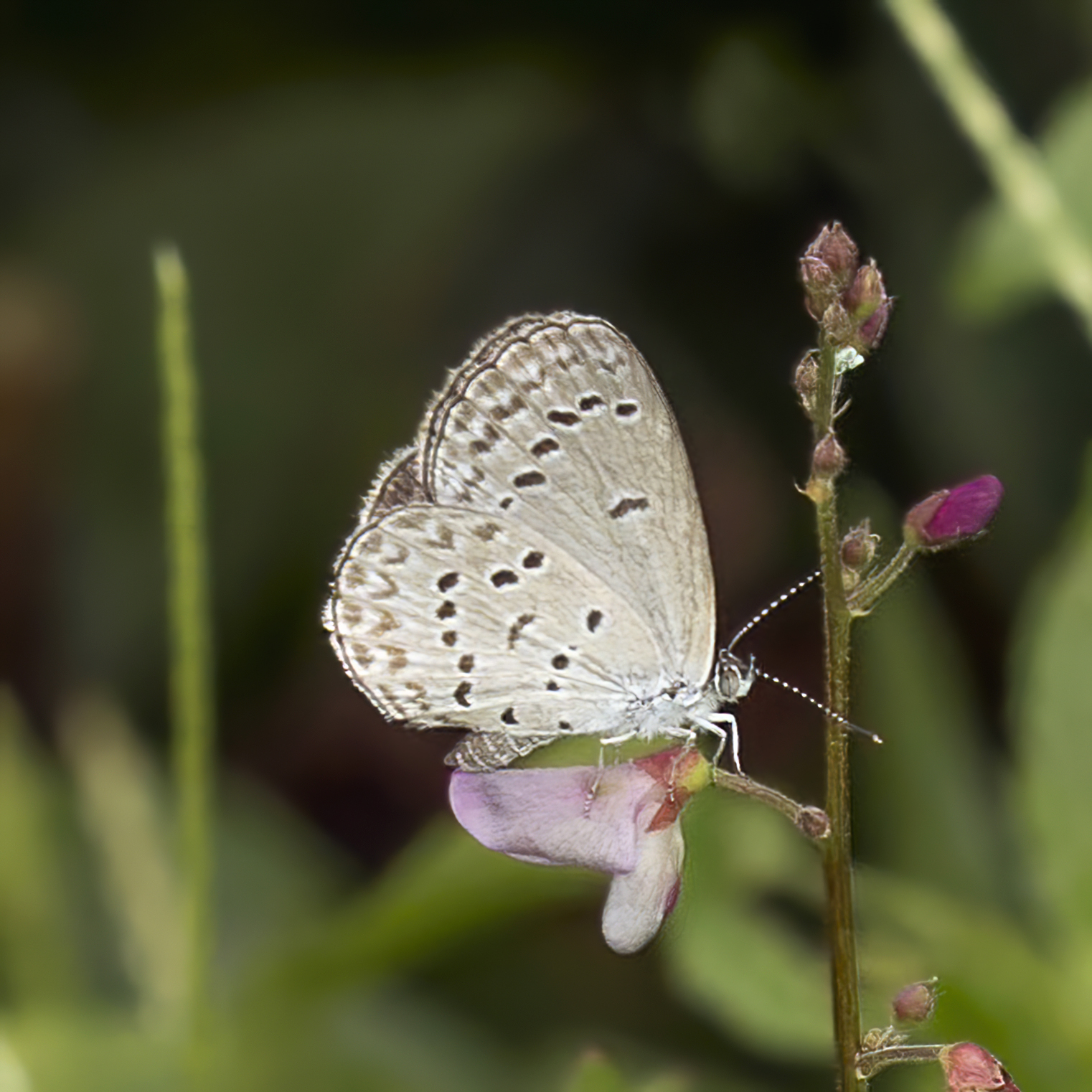
- in São Tomé and Príncipe

Scientific classification
- Domain: Eukaryota
- Kingdom: Animalia
- Phylum: Arthropoda
- Class: Insecta
- Order: Lepidoptera
- Family: Lycaenidae
- Genus: Zizina
- Species: Z. antanossa

Binomial name
- Zizina antanossa (Mabille, 1877)

Synonyms
- Lycaena antanossa Mabille, 1877; Zizera publia Hulstaert, 1924

= Zizina antanossa =

Dark grass blue

Species of butterfly

Zizina antanossa, the dark grass blue or clover blue, is a butterfly of the family Lycaenidae. It is found in all of Africa, including Madagascar and Réunion.

The wingspan is 20–24 mm for males and 21–28 mm for females. Adults are on wing year-round in warm areas, with peaks from October to November and from March to April in southern Africa.

The larvae feed on Desmodium and Indigofera species.
