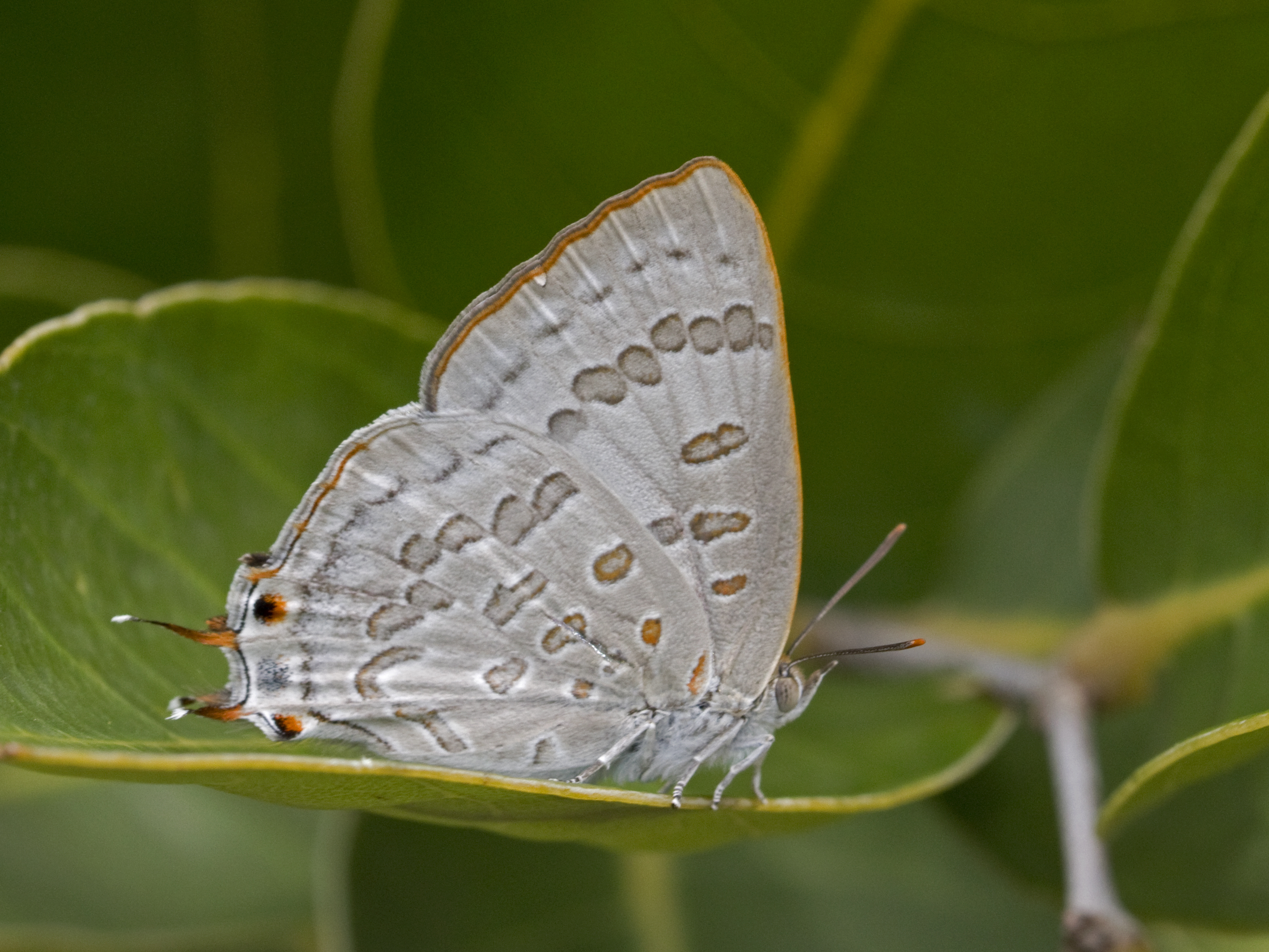

Scientific classification
- Domain: Eukaryota
- Kingdom: Animalia
- Phylum: Arthropoda
- Class: Insecta
- Order: Lepidoptera
- Family: Lycaenidae
- Tribe: Zesiini
- Genus: Zesius
- Species: Z. chrysomallus

Binomial name
- Zesius chrysomallus Hübner, 1819/21

= Zesius chrysomallus =

Redspot

Species of butterfly

Zesius chrysomallus, the redspot, is a species of lycaenid or blue butterfly found in Sri Lanka and India.

== Description ==
Male. Upperside pale cupreous-red, veins finely blackish-brown. Forewing with the costa and outer margin with a narrow brown band of fairly even width throughout. Hindwing with the costal space and abdominal fold pale brown; outer margin more narrowly brown, narrowing hindwards, the abdominal space outside the fold suffused narrowly with brown; a sub-terminal brown spot in each of the three anal interspaces, margined by a slender greyish-blue line, often obsolescent; tails brown, tipped with white. Underside pale grey, markings pale reddish-brown, edged with dark brown and white lines. Forewing with three somewhat linear spots in the cell, increasing in size outwards, sub-basal, medial and terminal; a similar spot below the medial spot; a discal band of six conjoined spots, with a seventh disconnected, the series slightly outwardly curved and somewhat irregular, the fourth and sixth from the costa being a little outwards, some dark suffusion in the middle of the hinder marginal space. Hindwing with a sub-basal small round spot in the cell, one on the costa above it and another below it, a larger spot in the middle, with a still larger spot on the costa above it and a smaller one below it, a bar at the end of the cell, composed of two conjoined spots, the lower shifted half outwards; a discal outwardly curved series of nine spots, the first six from the costa conjoined, the second the largest, its outer lower end touching the inner upper end of the third; the fifth inwards, the sixth and seventh outwardly oblique, the latter somewhat linear and detached, the ninth represented by a short line running in on the abdominal margin and well separated from the seventh, with the eighth, a minute spot between them, a small black spot at the anal angle, another in the first interspace, both capped with orange, some blue and white scaling in the interspace between them, a white anteciliary thread from the anal angle to vein 2; cilia brown, with a white line in its middle; both wings with a sub-marginal series of small lunular marks, only faintly indicated in the forewing. Antennae black, whitish beneath, club with an orange-red tip; frons black; head and body blackish-brown above, grey beneath. Female. Upperside. Foreicing pale blue, the outer borders blackish-brown with a violet tint, narrow on the costa to the end of the cell, and also narrow on the hinder margin, the apex broadly blackish-brown, the band running down the outer margin about twice as broadly as it is on the costa; the width of all these blackish marginal bands varies somewhat in different examples. Hindwing with the blue ground colour of the wing suffused more or less over its whole extent with blackish-brown, the suffusion being darkest on the costal part; a very small anal black spot, sometimes absent, a large sub-terminal black spot in each of the next two interspaces and some smaller sub-terminal spots becoming obsolete upwards, the spot in the first interspace crowned with orange, the other with whitish; a white line inside the black terminal line; tails blackish, tipped with white; the extra tail at the end of vein 3 about half the length of the others. Underside as in the male, the ground colour paler.

— Charles Swinhoe, Lepidoptera Indica. Vol. IX

The host plants of the larvae include Terminalia catappa and Smilax zeylanica.
