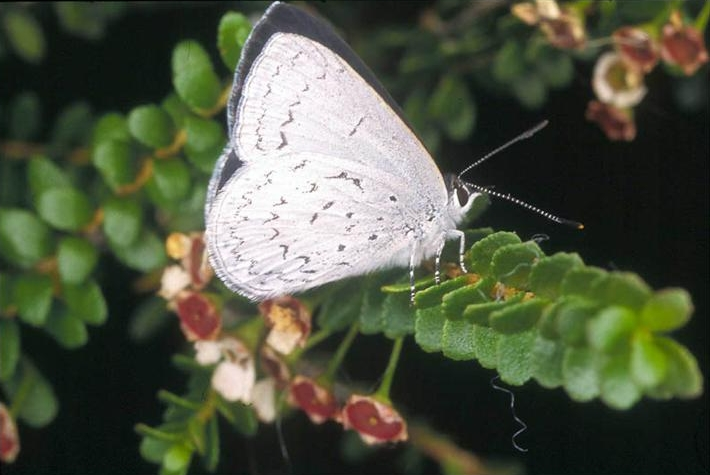
- Candalides absimilis

Scientific classification
- Kingdom: Animalia
- Phylum: Arthropoda
- Class: Insecta
- Order: Lepidoptera
- Family: Lycaenidae
- Subfamily: Polyommatinae
- Tribe: Candalidini; Eliot, 1973

Genera
- See text

= Candalidini =

Tribe of butterflies

Candalidini is a tribe of lycaenid butterflies in the subfamily Polyommatinae.The tribe is geographically restricted to Australia and New Guinea, where it has four genera and 37 species that evolved from a rainforest ancestor in the Australian region during the Eocene. The four genera based on morphological evidence are Eirmocides, Erina, Cyprotides, and Candalides. Most species of Candalidini butterflies are found and live in coastal rainforests in Australia, open forest, and woodland habitats, while others are found in New Guinea which has the biggest diversity, as many species live in lowland and montane areas.

== Genera ==
- Candalides Hübner, [1819]
- Nesolycaena Waterhouse & Turner, 1905
- Zetona Waterhouse, 1938
