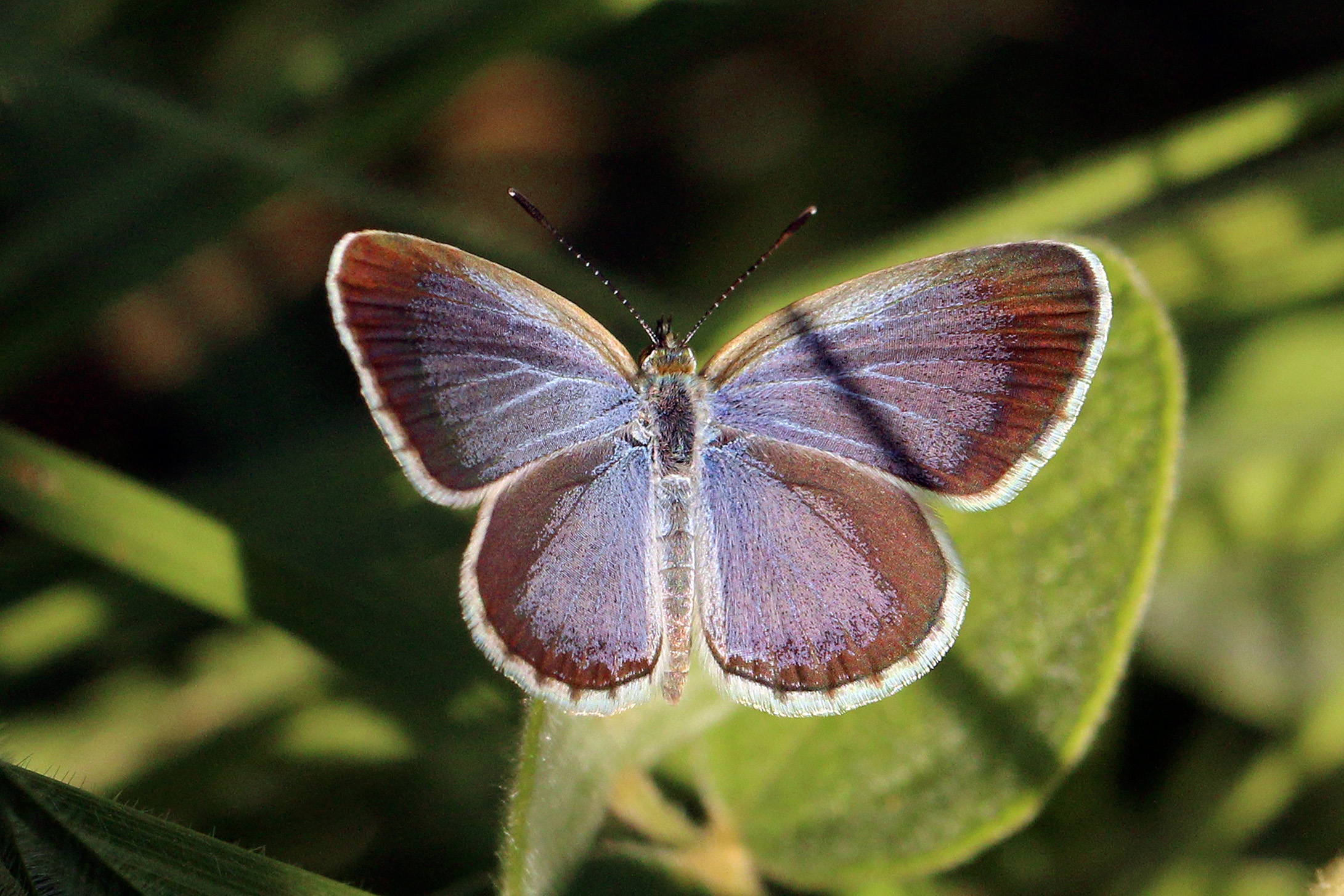
- Z. o. lampa, upperside
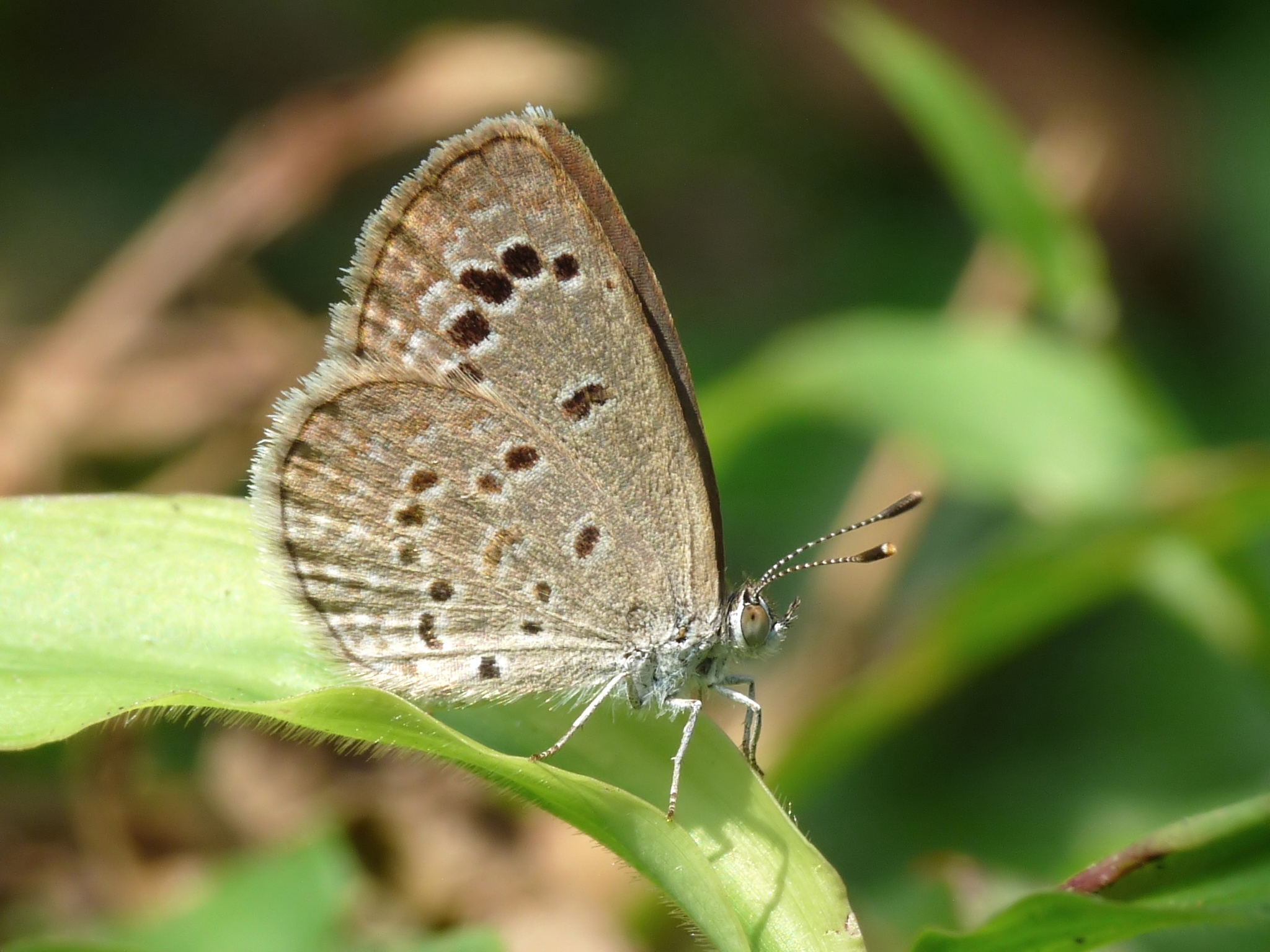
- Z. o. indica, underside

Scientific classification
- Kingdom: Animalia
- Phylum: Arthropoda
- Clade: Pancrustacea
- Class: Insecta
- Order: Lepidoptera
- Family: Lycaenidae
- Genus: Zizina
- Species: Z. otis

Binomial name
- Zizina otis (Fabricius, 1787)

Subspecies
- see text

= Zizina otis =

Lesser grass blue

Species of butterfly

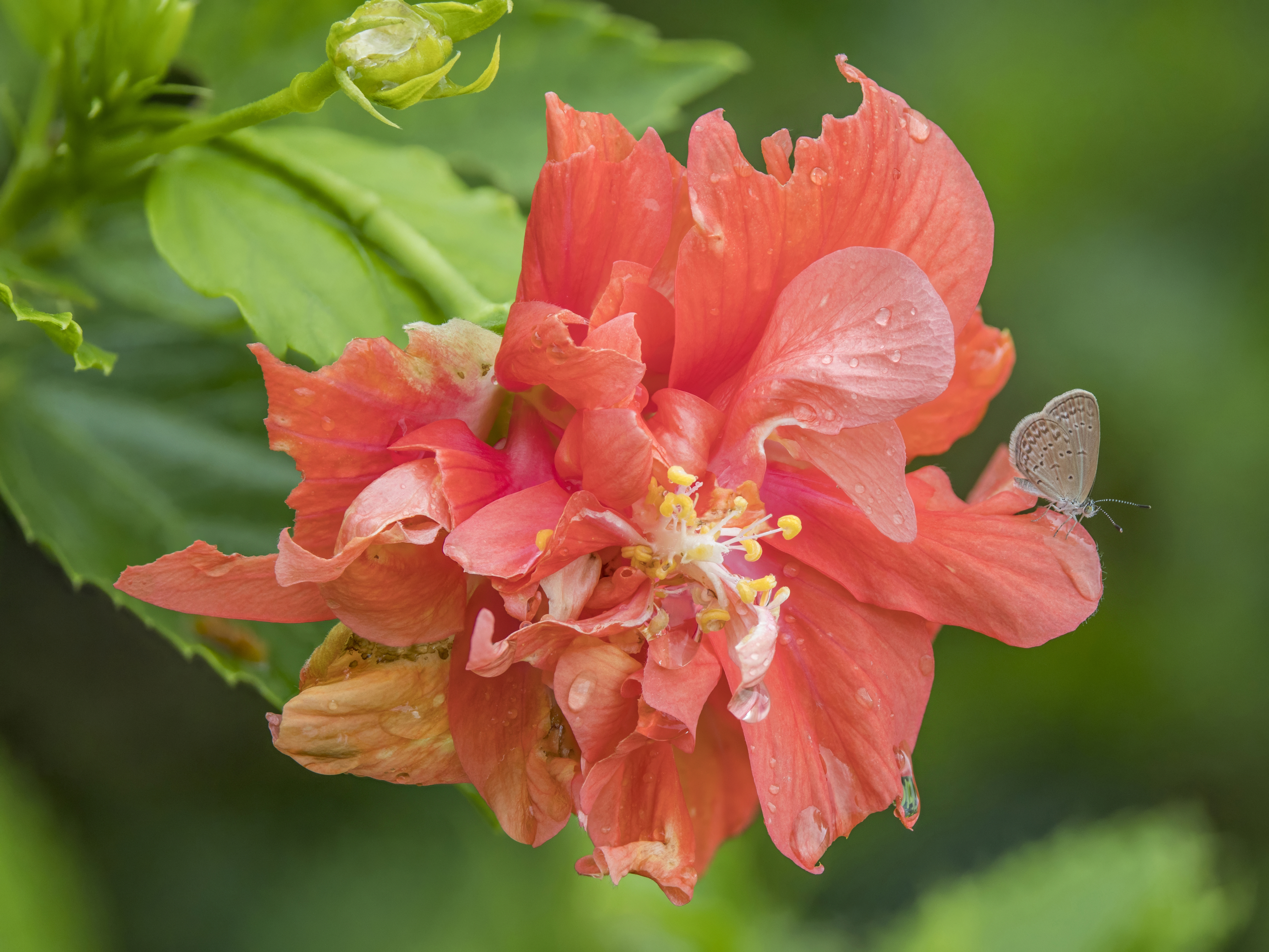
on Hibiscus flower, Palau

Zizina otis, the lesser grass blue, is a species of blue (Lycaenidae) butterfly found in south and southeast Asia, Australia, and much of Africa. The species was first described by Johan Christian Fabricius in 1787. The lesser grass blue in Australia is often elevated to a different species, the common grass blue Zizina labradus, though several taxonomists regard Zizinia labradus as a subspecies of the little grass blue. Zizina species evolved from a common ancestor about 2.5 million years ago, with the ancestor of Zizina otis adapting to tropical and subtropical zones, and the extant Zizina otis dispersing to Afrotropica, Oriental and Australian regions. Zizinia otis expansion into Australia may have competitively reduced the extent of Zizina oxleyi in New Zealand.

== Distribution ==
Zizina otis occurs in south Asia and south-east Asia. It was reported from the Hawaiian island of Oahu in 2008. While Zizina otis labradus is found across mainland Australia, Tasmania and nearby islands, Zizina otis oxleyi is found only in the southern part of the South Island and Zizina otis labdalon is found only in Queensland around the Cape York peninsula. Zizina otis antanossa is found widely across Africa.

== Description ==
=== Male upperside ===
Pale violet blue, with a silvery sheen in certain lights, forewing: a broad brown edging along the termen, which covers in some specimens quite the outer fourth of the wing, while in others is much narrower. It is always broadest at the apex and is bounded by an anteciliary darker line, beyond which the cilia are brownish at base and white outwardly.

Hindwing: anterior or costal third to half and apex brown; a slender black anteciliary line, beyond which the cilia are as in the forewing.

=== Male underside ===
Brownish grey. Forewing: a short, transverse, dusky lunule on the discocellulars and a transverse, anteriorly curved, discal series of seven minute black spots, all the spots more or less rounded, the posterior two geminate (paired), the discocellular lunule and each discal spot conspicuously encircled with white; the terminal markings beyond the above consist of an inner and an outer transverse subterminal series of dusky spots, each spot edged on the inner side very obscurely with dusky white, the inner line of spots lunular, the outer with the spots more or less rounded. Cilia dusky.

Hindwing: a transverse, curved, sub-basal series of four spots and an irregular transverse discal series of nine small spots black, each spot encircled narrowly with white. Of the discal spots the posterior four are placed in an outwardly oblique, slightly curved line, the middle two spots geminate; the three spots above these are placed in an oblique transverse line further outwards; lastly, the anterior two spots are posited one over the other and shifted well inwards, just above the apex of the cell; discocellular lunule and terminal markings as on the forewing, but the inner subterminal lunular line in the latter broader and more prominent. Cilia dusky. Antenna black, shafts ringed with white; head, thorax and abdomen brown, with a little blue scaling; beneath: white.

=== Female upperside ===
Brown, with a more or less distinct suffusion of violet blue at the bases of the wings, on the hindwing continued obscurely along the dorsum; both forewings and hindwings with slender anteciliary lines, darker than the ground colour.

=== Female underside ===
Ground colour slightly darker than in the male, markings precisely similar. Antennae, head, thorax and abdomen as in the male, but the thorax and abdomen above without any blue scaling.

== Subspecies ==
- Z. o. annetta Toxopeus, 1929
- Z. o. aruensis (Swinhoe, 1916)
- Z. o. caduca (Butler, [1876])
- Z. o. indica (Murray, 1874)
- Z. o. kuli Toxopeus, 1929
- Z. o. lampa (Corbet, 1940)
- Z. o. lampra Tite, 1969
- Z. o. luculenta (Kurihara, 1948)
- Z. o. mangoensis (Butler, 1884)
- Z. o. oblongata (Kurihara, 1948)
- Z. o. oriens (Butler, 1883)
- Z. o. otis (Fabricius, 1787)
- Z. o. oxleyi (C. & R. Felder, [1865])
- Z. o. parasangra Toxopeus, 1929
- Z. o. riukuensis (Matsumura, 1929)
- Z. o. sangra (Moore, [1866])
- Z. o. soeriomataram Kalis, 1938
- Z. o. tanagra (Felder, 1860)

There are possibly two undescribed subspecies from Sulawesi/Selayar & Banggai.

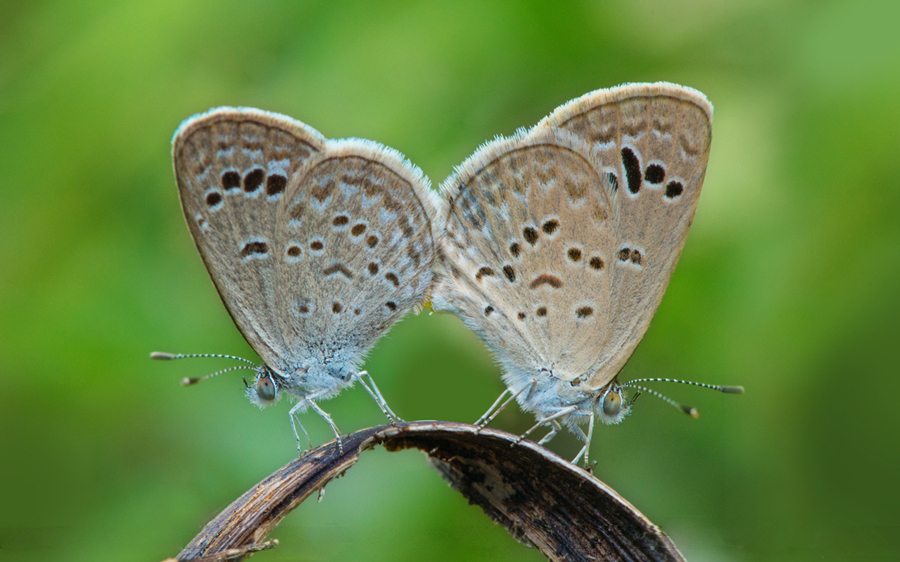
Z. o. indica, mating, India

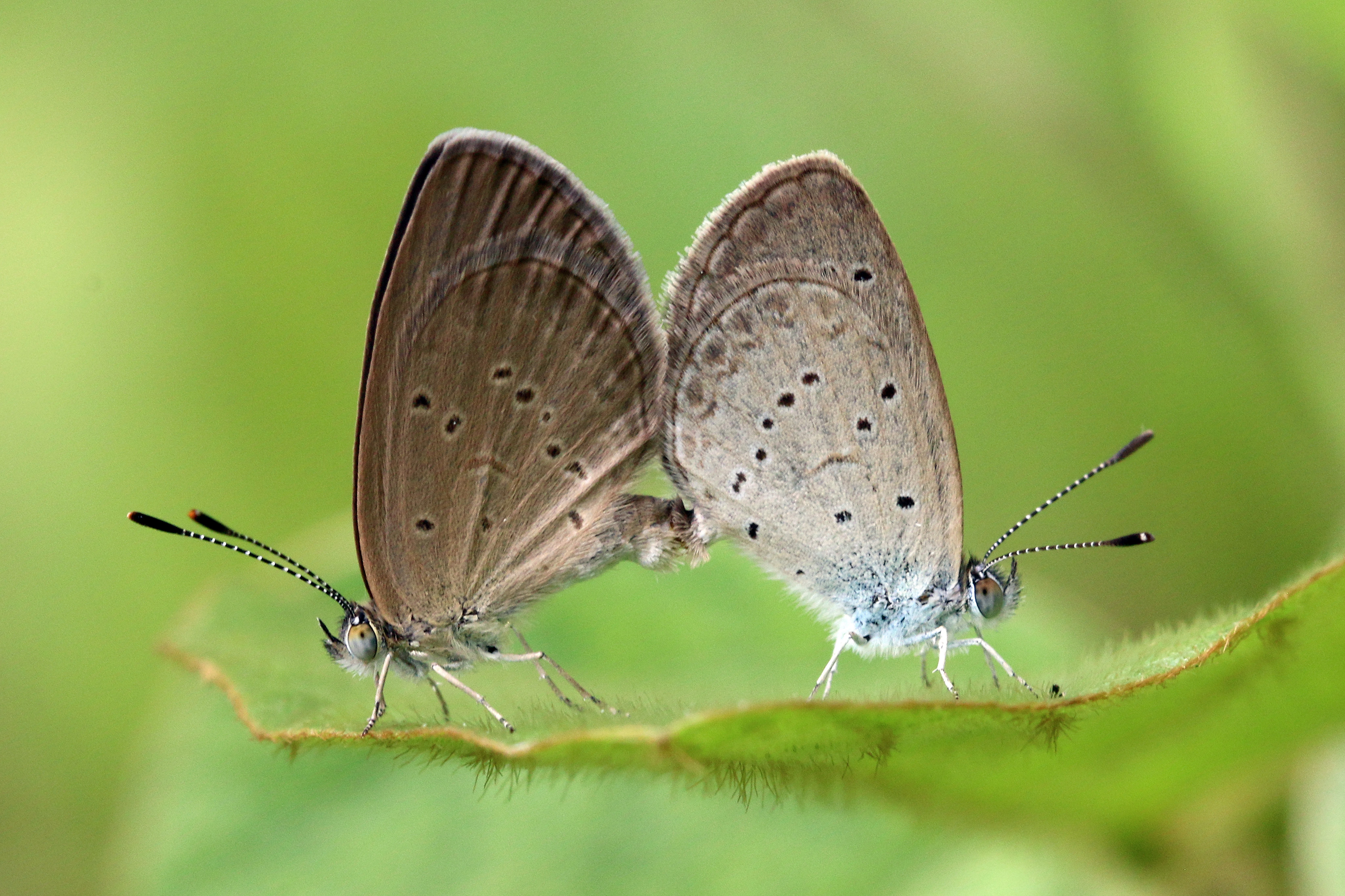
Z. o. lampa, mating, Singapore

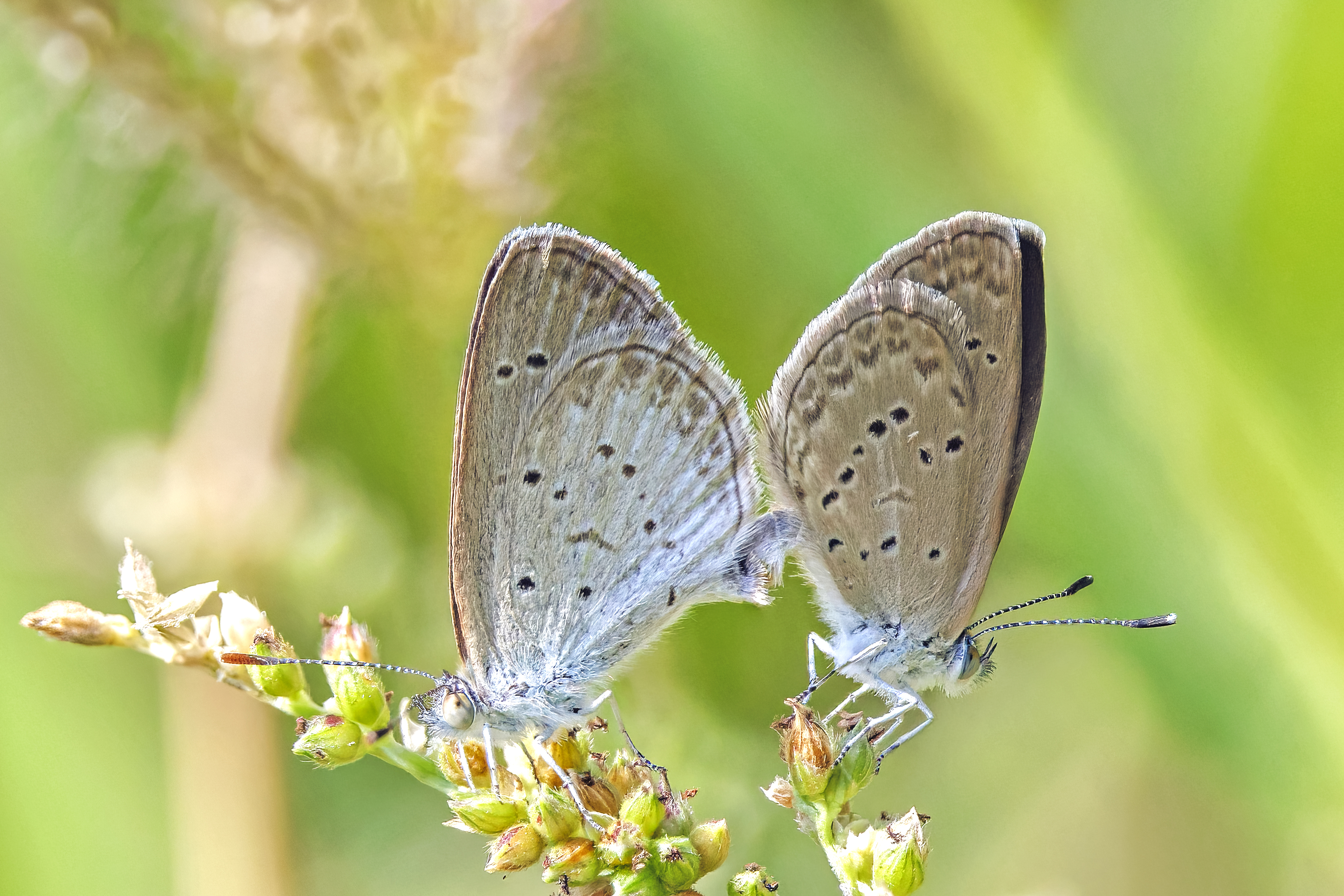
Z. o. sangra, mating, Vietnam

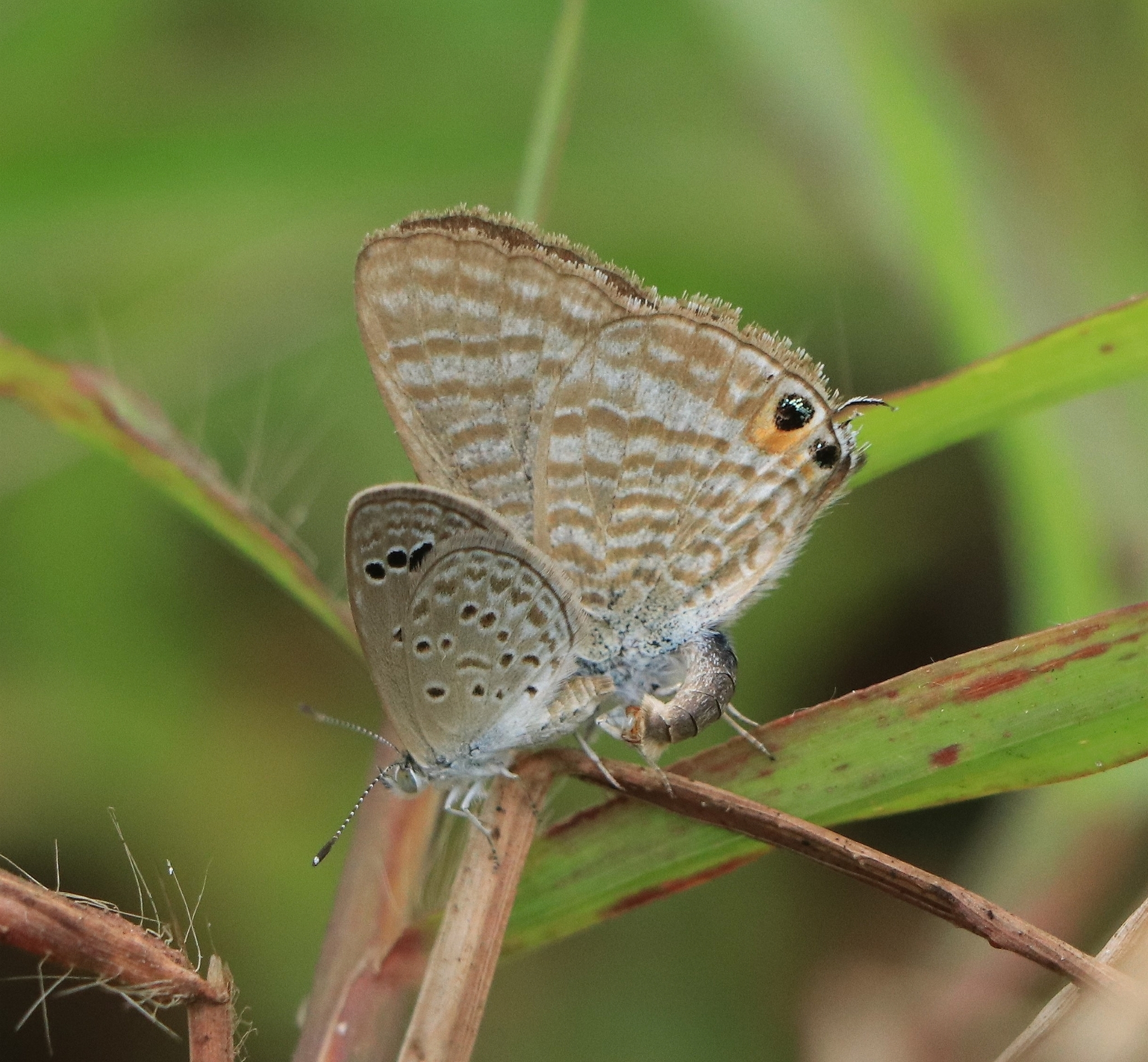
mating with pea blue

== Larval host plants ==
The species breeds on many plants of the family Leguminosae including Alysicarpus vaginalis, A. monilifer, Desmodium species, Glycine max, Indigofera species, and Mimosa species.

== Gallery ==
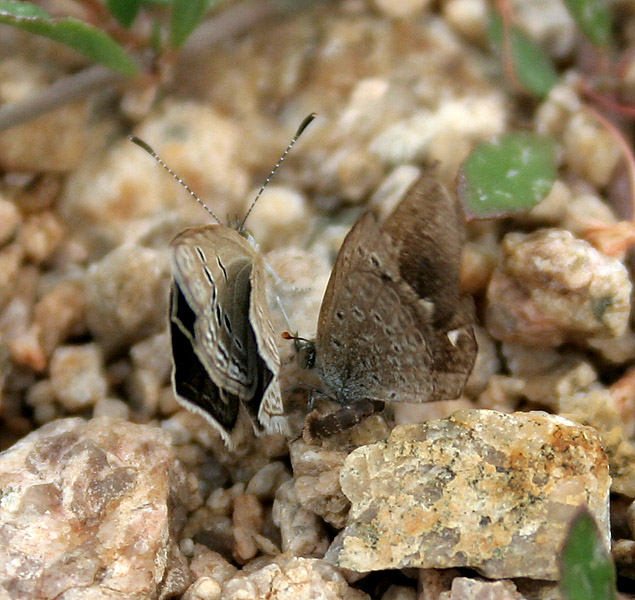
Trying to mate in Hyderabad, India

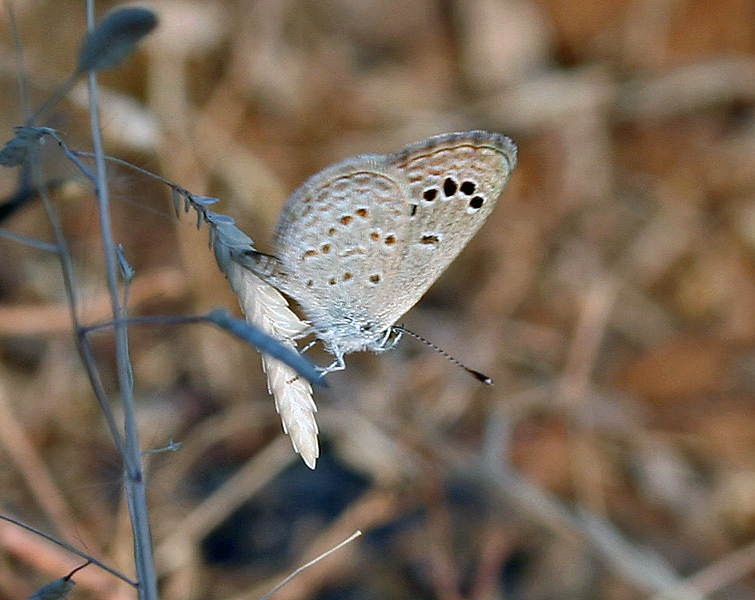
At Sindhrot in Vadodara district of Gujarat, India

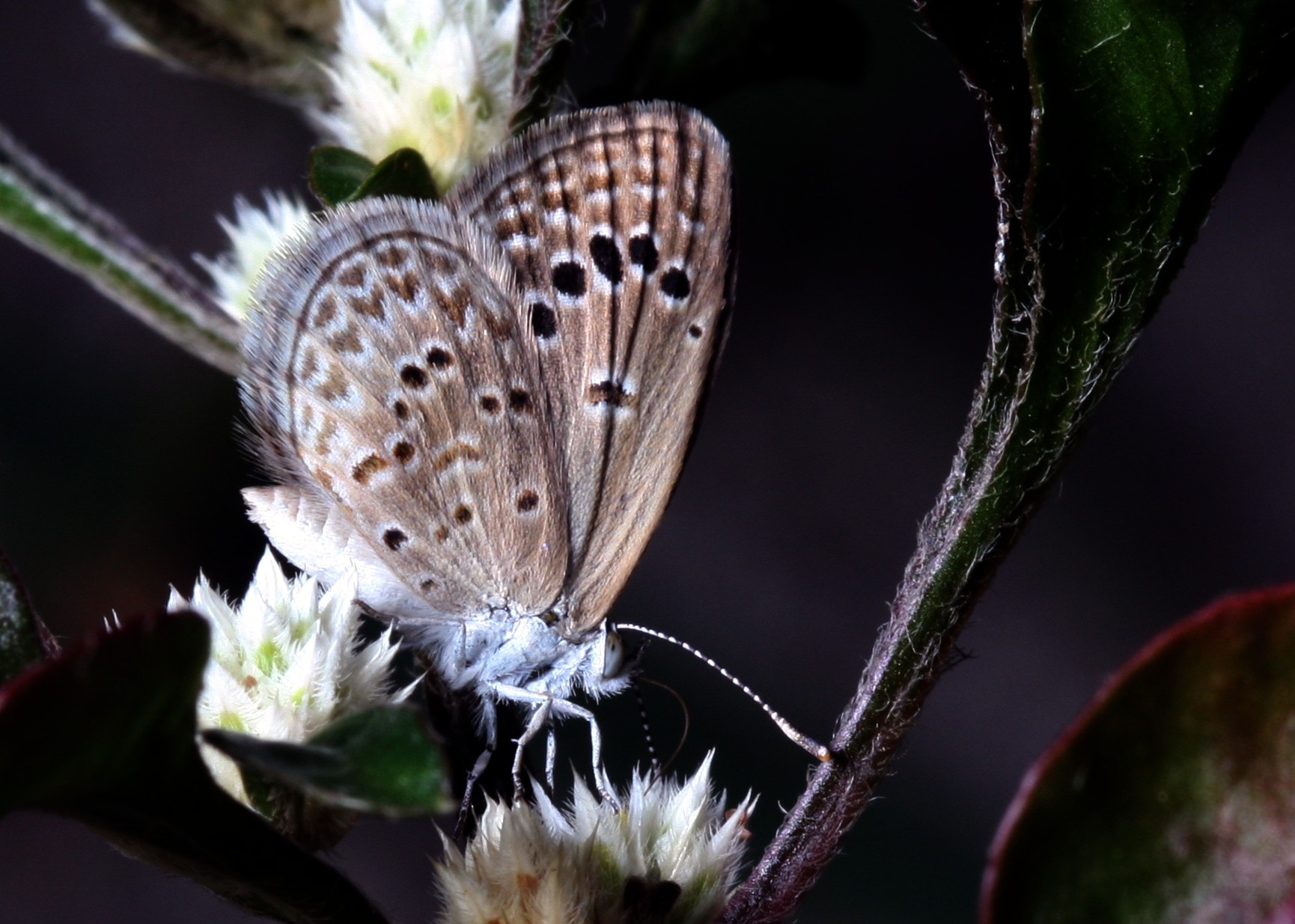
At Kadawata in Sri Lanka

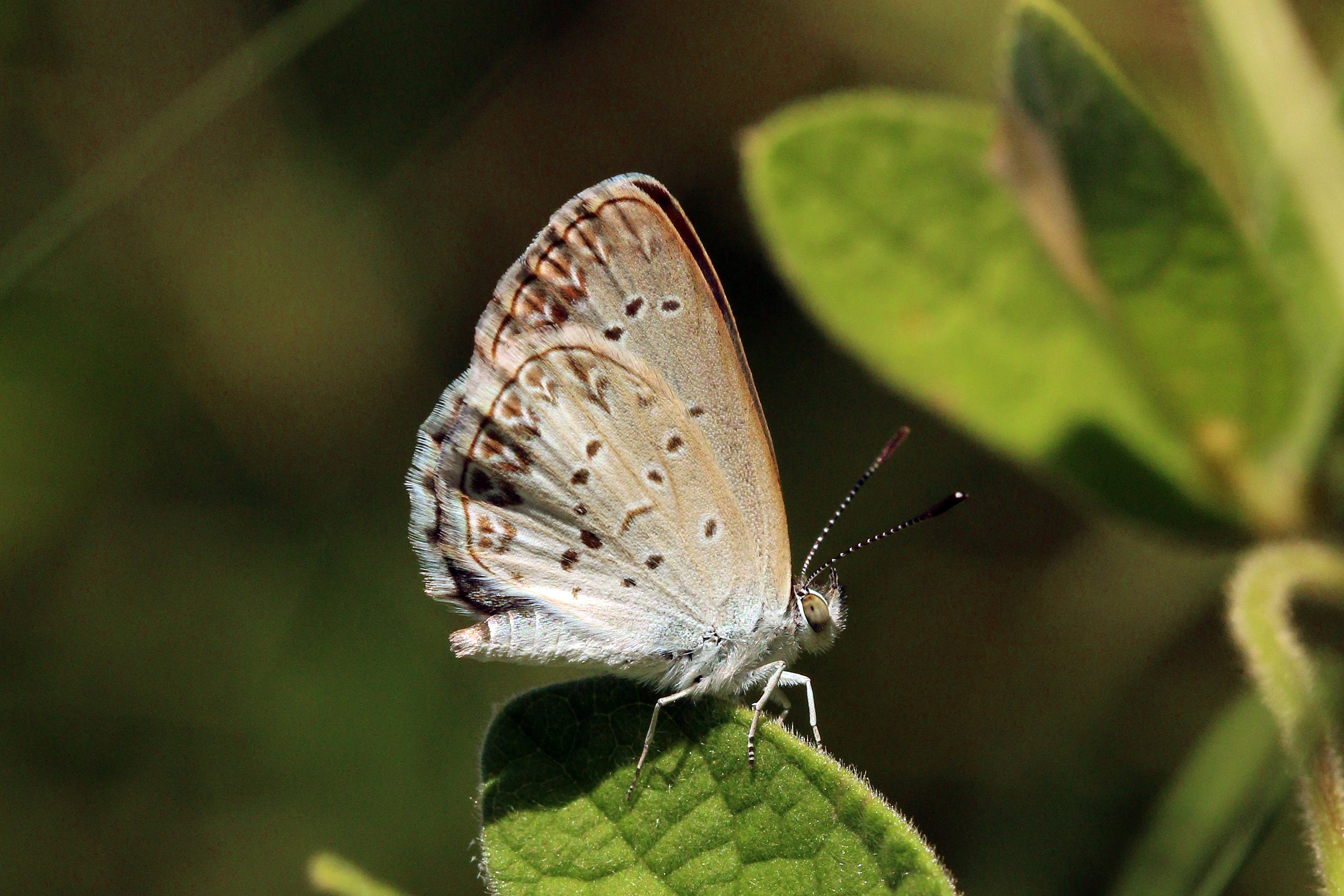
Zizina otis lampa

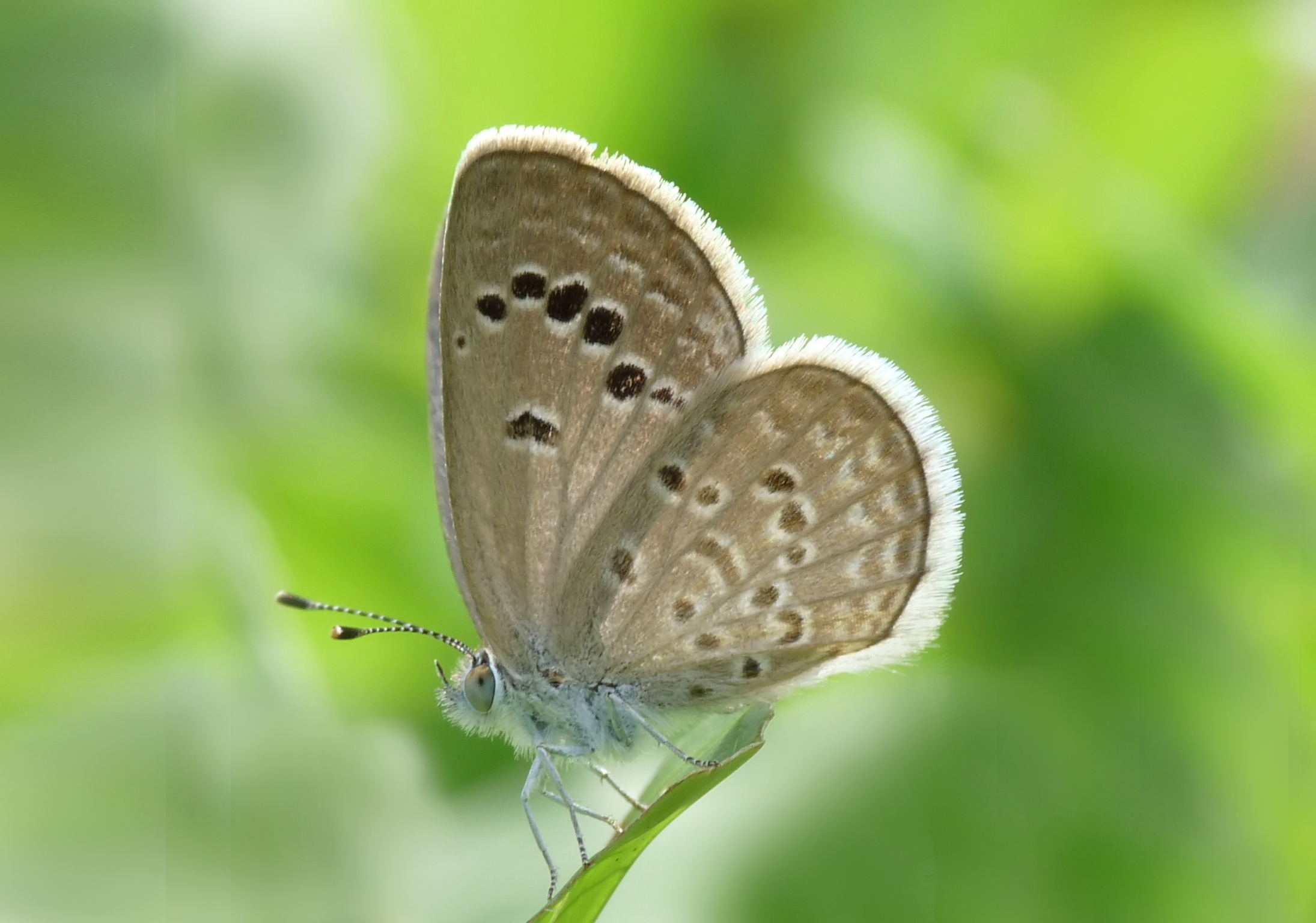
Under back-lit in Kerala, India

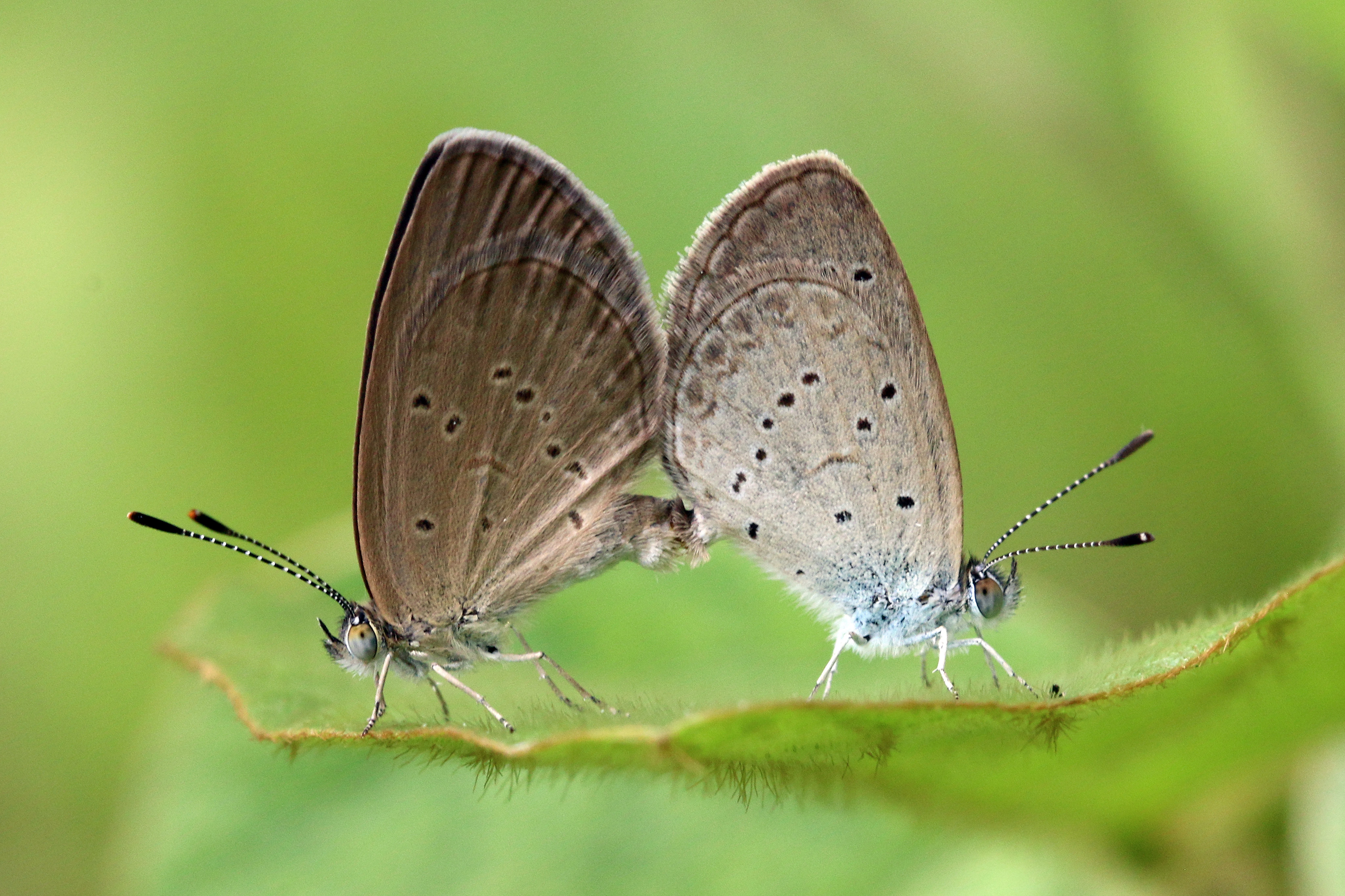
Z. o. lampa mating in Singapore

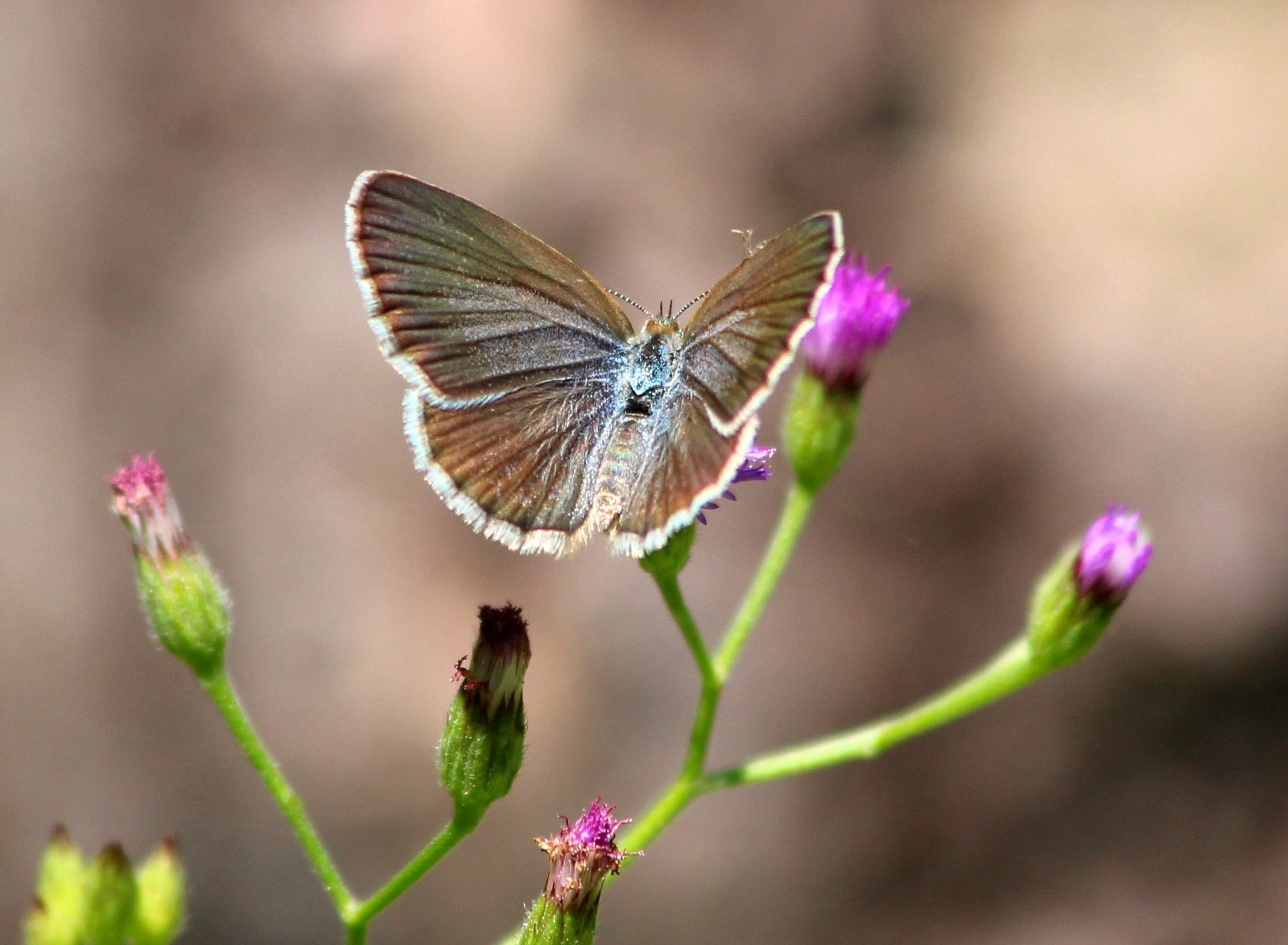
Z. otis in Indonesia

== See also ==
- List of butterflies of India (Lycaenidae)

== General reading ==
- Evans, W. H. (1932). The Identification of Indian Butterflies (2nd ed.). Mumbai, India: Bombay Natural History Society.
- Gaonkar, Harish (1996). Butterflies of the Western Ghats, India (including Sri Lanka) - A Biodiversity Assessment of a Threatened Mountain System. Bangalore, India: Centre for Ecological Sciences.
- Gay, Thomas; Kehimkar, Isaac David; Punetha, Jagdish Chandra (1992). Common Butterflies of India. Nature Guides. Bombay, India: World Wide Fund for Nature-India by Oxford University Press. ISBN 978-0195631647.
- Haribal, Meena (1992). The Butterflies of Sikkim Himalaya and Their Natural History. Gangtok, Sikkim, India: Sikkim Nature Conservation Foundation.
- Kunte, Krushnamegh (2000). Butterflies of Peninsular India. India, A Lifescape. Hyderabad, India: Universities Press. ISBN 978-8173713545.
- Wynter-Blyth, Mark Alexander (1957). Butterflies of the Indian Region. Bombay, India: Bombay Natural History Society. ISBN 978-8170192329.
