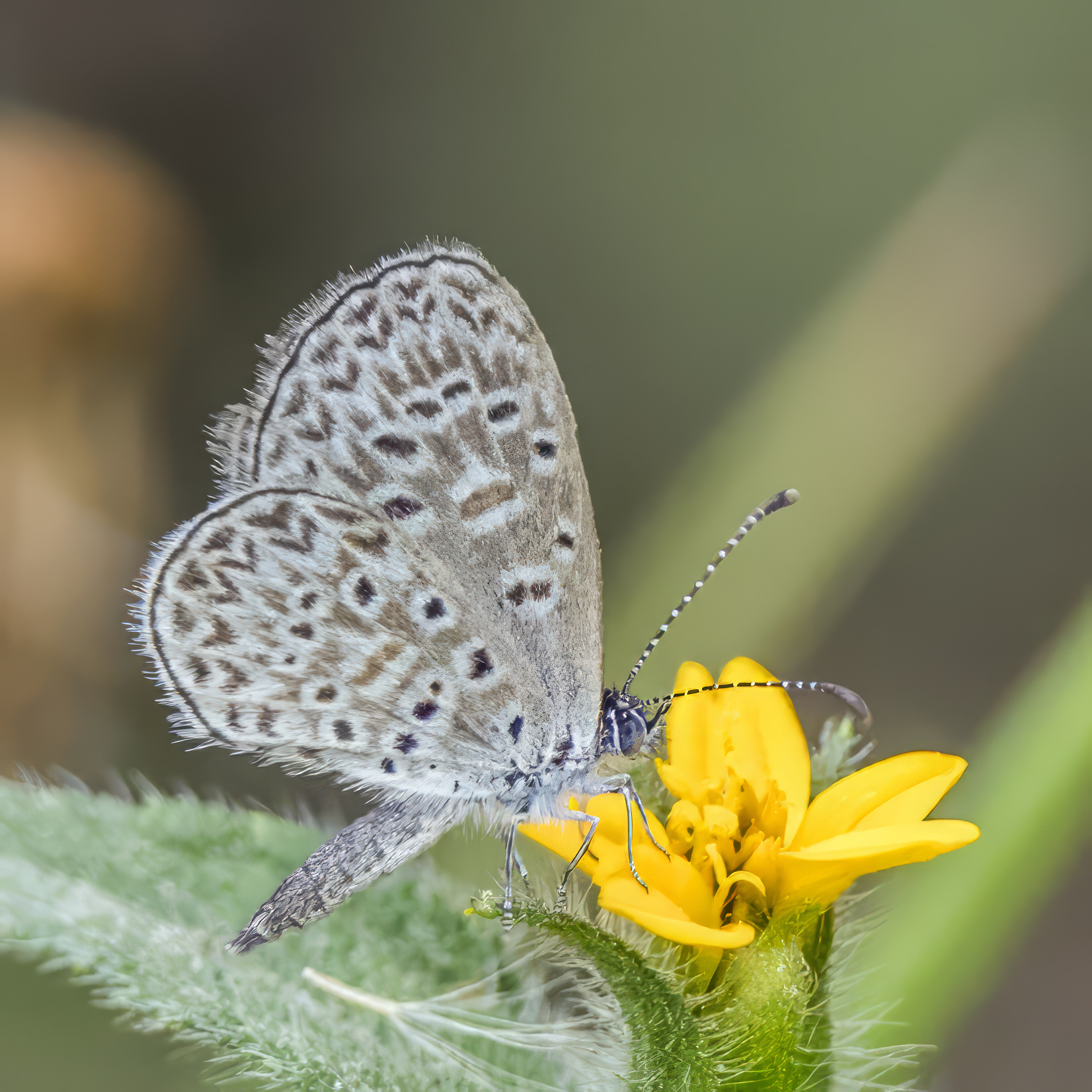
- in Colombia

Scientific classification
- Kingdom: Animalia
- Phylum: Arthropoda
- Class: Insecta
- Order: Lepidoptera
- Family: Lycaenidae
- Genus: Zizula
- Species: Z. cyna

Binomial name
- Zizula cyna (Edwards, 1881)

Synonyms
- Lycaena cyna Edwards, 1881; Lycaena tulliola Godman & Salvin, [1887]; Lycaena mela Strecker, 1900; Cupido mela (Strecker, 1900); Hemiargus cyna (Edwards, 1881); Everes tulliola (Godman & Salvin, [1887])

= Zizula cyna =

Species of butterfly

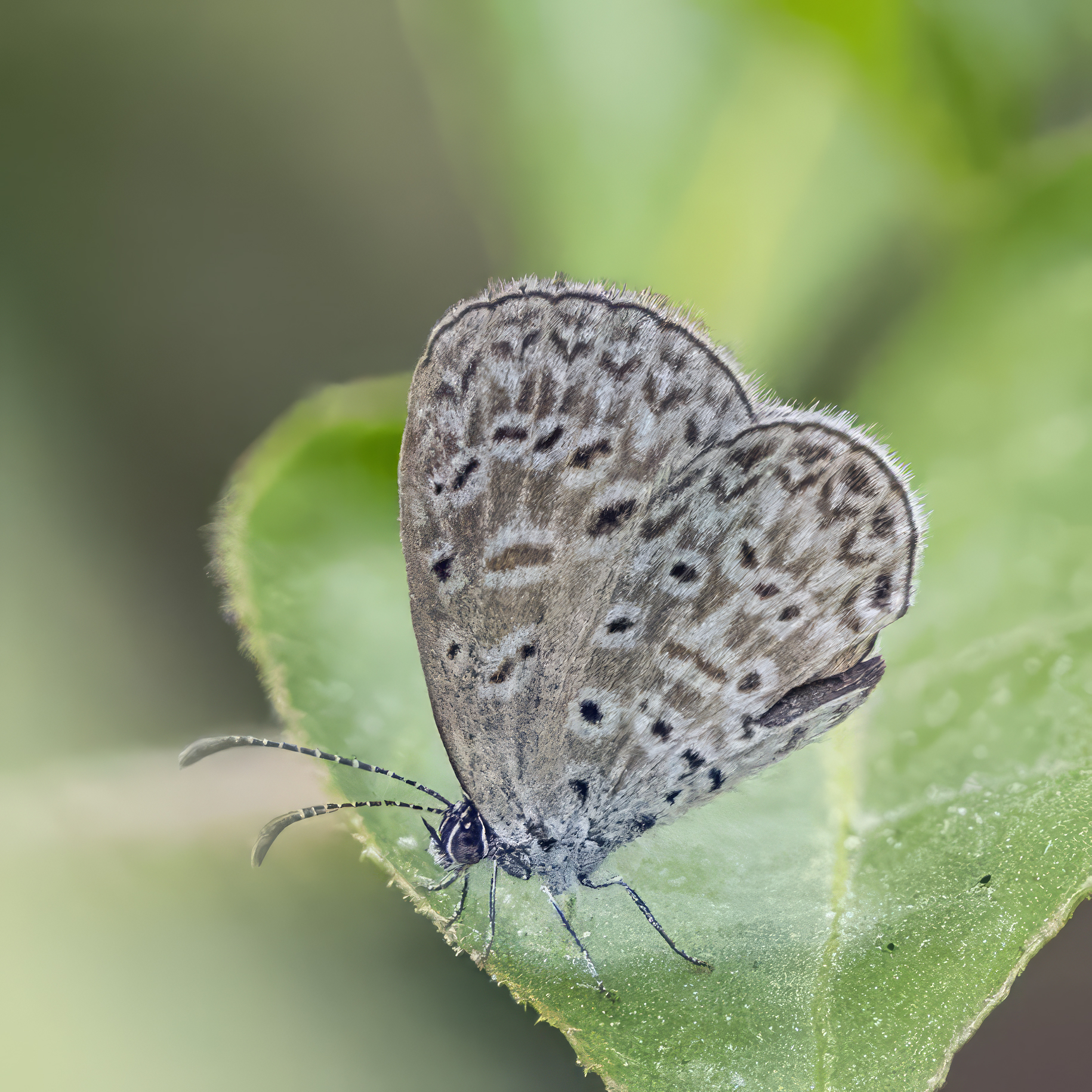
showing the variable spots

Zizula cyna, the cyna blue, is a butterfly species in the family Lycaenidae.

== Distribution ==
The cyna blue is found from southern Texas, south through Mexico and Central America, to Argentina in South America.

They are usually found in subtropical areas and deserts.

Strays can be found up to northern Texas and Kansas, and southern Arizona.

== Description ==
The wingspan of Zizula cyna is 16–22 mm (5/8–7/8 of an inch).

Its upper-side is a violet blue, while its underside is a pale gray covered in tiny black dots.

Adults are on wing from March to November.

Food

The larvae feed on flower buds of Acanthaceae species. Adults feed on flower nectar.
