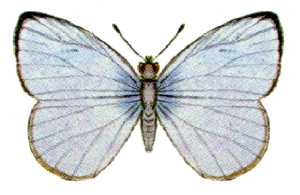
- Nesolycaena albosericea

Scientific classification
- Domain: Eukaryota
- Kingdom: Animalia
- Phylum: Arthropoda
- Class: Insecta
- Order: Lepidoptera
- Family: Lycaenidae
- Tribe: Candalidini
- Genus: Nesolycaena; Waterhouse & Turner, 1905

Synonyms
- Adaluma Tindale, 1922

= Nesolycaena =

Butterfly genus in family Lycaenidae

Nesolycaena is a genus of butterflies in the family Lycaenidae. The members (species) are found in the Australasian realm.

== Species ==
- Nesolycaena albosericea (Miskin, 1891)
- Nesolycaena caesia d'Apice & Miller, 1992
- Nesolycaena medicea Braby, 1996
- Nesolycaena urumelia (Tindale, 1922)
