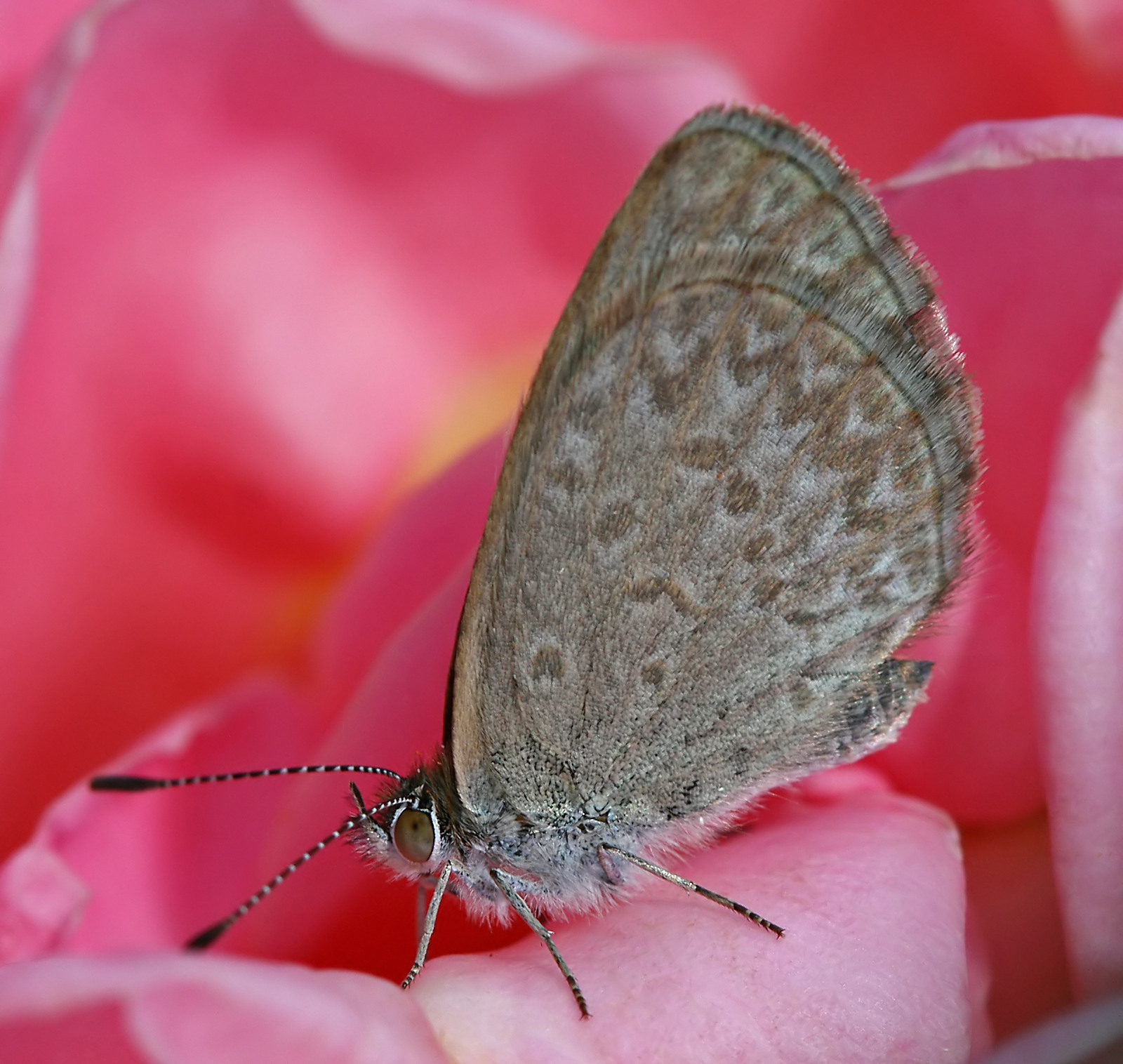
- This specimen, perched on a rose, is approximately 10 mm in size
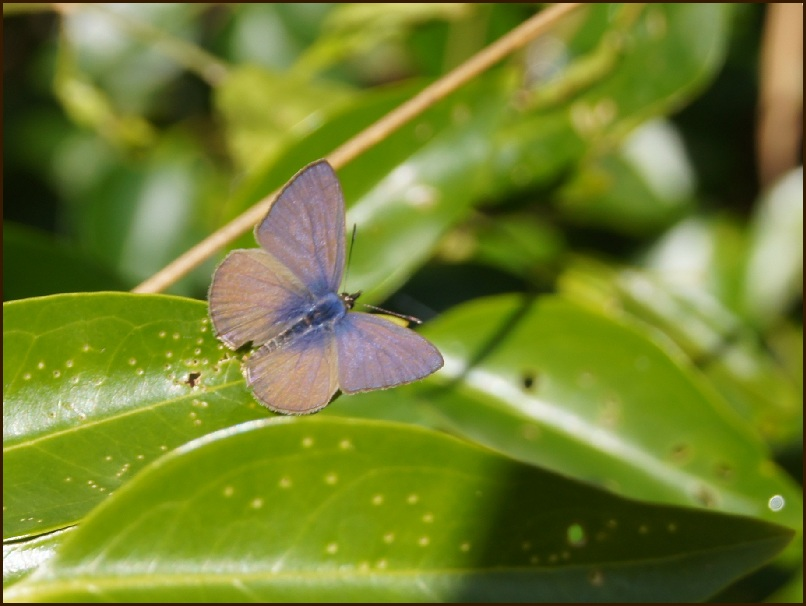
- At Cape Hillsborough National Park, Australia

Scientific classification
- Kingdom: Animalia
- Phylum: Arthropoda
- Class: Insecta
- Order: Lepidoptera
- Family: Lycaenidae
- Genus: Zizina
- Species: Z. labradus

Binomial name
- Zizina labradus (Godart, [1824])

Subspecies
- Z. l. labdalon; Z. l. labradus

= Zizina labradus =

Common grass blue

Species of butterfly

Zizina labradus, the common grass blue, grass blue, or clover blue, is a small Australian butterfly of the family Lycaenidae.

== Description ==
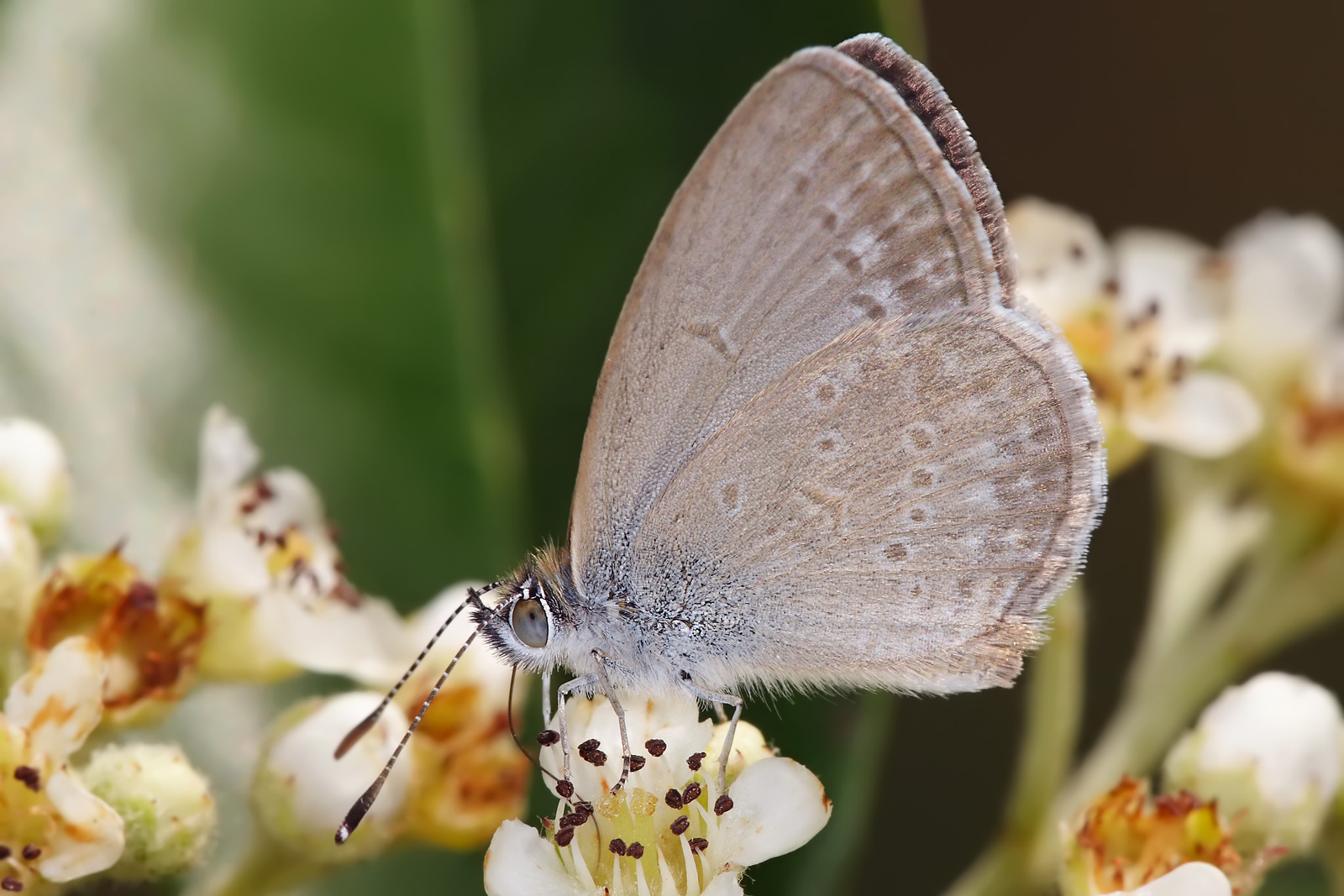
Adult feeding from Cotoneaster sp.

Adults are purplish blue on the upper wing surface with a black body and black or brown wing margins. These margins are larger on the female than the male. The lower wing surface is brown to pale brownish grey with a pattern of fawn bands and spots, with the body covered in white or grey hairs. The wingspans of females are slightly larger than males, females having a wingspan of 23 mm and males 20 mm. Common grass blues have a weak, fluttering flight and so usually fly near ground level close to a food source.

Eggs are white or pale blue and have a mandarin shape with a pitted surface. Caterpillars reach about 7 mm in length, and their appearance is primarily green with a yellow stripe at the sides and a darker green stripe on the back, and brown or black head usually obscured under the thorax. In captivity, fed on an artificial diet, larvae come in highly variable colours, ranging from white through red to dark purple. Pupa are 10 mm long with erect hairs. Colouration varies, ranging from pink, greyish or greenish cream and contains mottled dark spots.

== Distribution ==
The subspecies Zizina labradus labradus is found over most of continental Australia, as well as on Lord Howe Island, Norfolk Island, and Christmas Island, while the subspecies Zizina labradus labdalon is restricted mainly to Cape York Peninsula. The common grass blue is often misidentified as the lesser grass blue, Zizina otis.

Zizina labradus labradus, as its name suggests, is very common and can be found in suburban gardens, particularly perching in grass; lawns and fields.

== Growth ==
Single eggs are laid which can hatch in a matter of days. The eggs are laid on leaves, stems, flower buds and young pods of food plants, chiefly legumes of the family Fabaceae such as beans, clover, and various native species including Cullen australasicum (Tall Scurf-pea); Hardenbergia violacea (Native Lilac); Kennedia prostrata (Running Postman); and Lotus australis (Austral Trefoil). Newly hatched larvae eat small holes from young leaves or flower buds, and later feed mainly inside flowers. The larvae are considered a minor pest and will feed on leguminous plants such as garden beans by eating a small hole into the pods and then devouring the soft seeds within. In captivity when food is scarce the larger larvae will cannibalize smaller ones.

The larvae are typically attended by ants of the genera Paratrechina, Rhytidoponera, and Tapinoma.

The pupa attaches to the lower leaf surface of the food plants with anal hooks and a central girdle.
