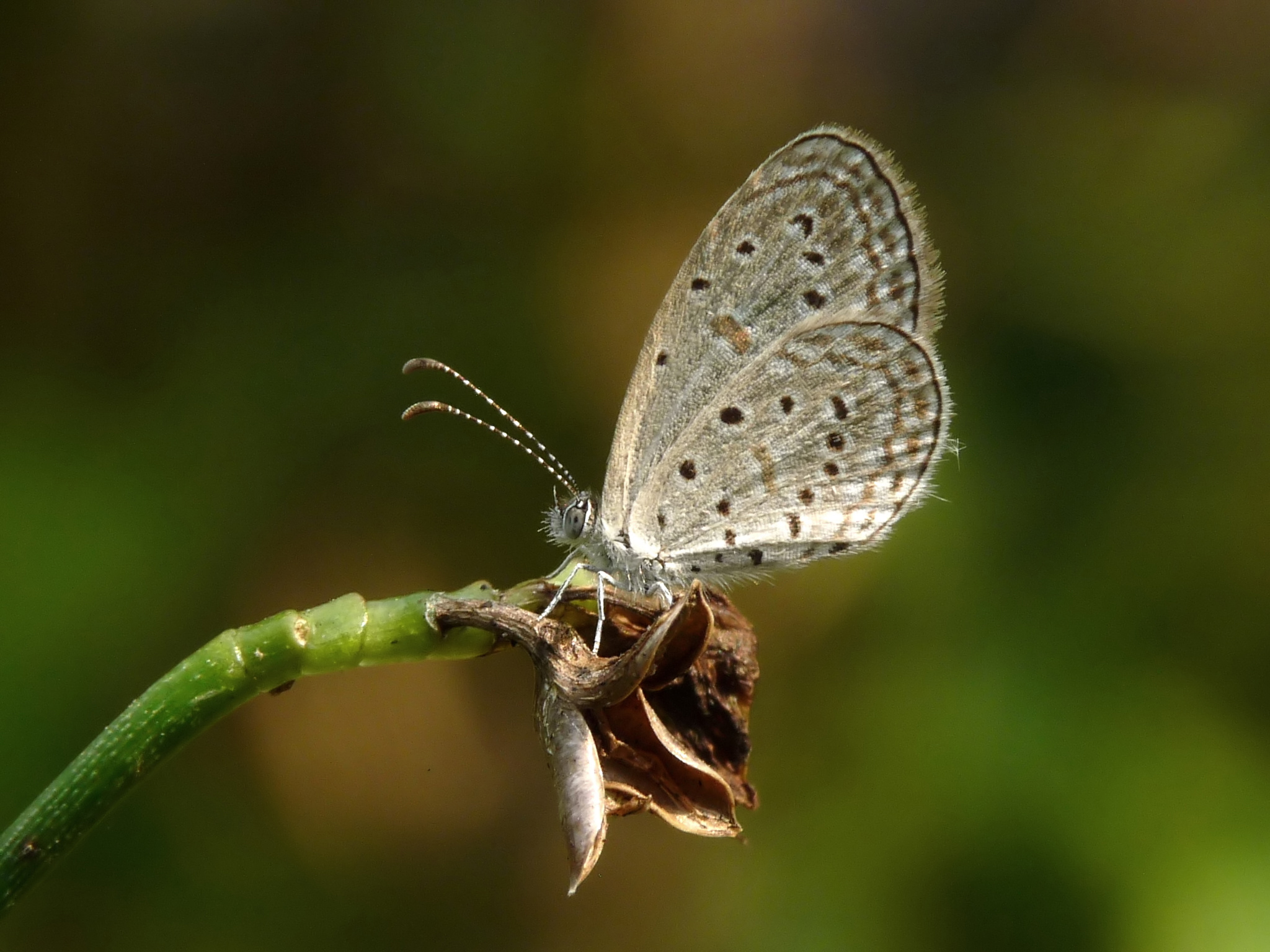
- In Kerala, India

Conservation status
- Least Concern (IUCN 3.1)

Scientific classification
- Kingdom: Animalia
- Phylum: Arthropoda
- Clade: Pancrustacea
- Class: Insecta
- Order: Lepidoptera
- Family: Lycaenidae
- Genus: Zizula
- Species: Z. hylax

Binomial name
- Zizula hylax (Fabricius, 1775)

Synonyms
- Papilio hylax Fabricius, 1775; Lycaena gaika Trimen, 1862; Lycaena mylica Guenée, 1863; Lycaena cleodora Walker, 1870; Lycaena perparva Saalmüller, 1884

= Zizula hylax =

Tiny grass blue

Species of butterfly

Zizula hylax, the tiny grass blue, is a species of blue butterfly.

== Description ==
Male upperside: dull violet blue, which changes to a brighter tint of violet in certain lights. Forewing: the costa very narrowly, the termen much more broadly dull brown; this edging to the termen in most specimens decreases in width from apex to tornus, and is outwardly followed by an anteciliary darker brown line. Cilia brownish anteriorly, posteriorly brownish at the base with the apical portions white. Hindwing: the ground colour brighter than on the forewing, the costal and terminal margins much more narrowly edged with brown, which edging is merged in the anteciliary dark brown line. Cilia: brown along their basal halves, white apically.

Underside: grey. Forewing: a dusky brown lunular line on the discocellulars; two subcostal spots above the cell, one on either side of the discocellular lunule; a very strongly curved discal series of five spots, of which the posterior three are somewhat lunular in shape and placed obliquely en echelon, the next above these hook shaped, the anterior spot round; both the subcostal spots and the spots of the discal series are black, each narrowly encircled with white; beyond these are inner and outer subterminal dusky lines, which anteriorly are continuous, posteriorly somewhat broken and macular, followed by a very conspicuous jet-black anteciliary slender line. Cilia greyish white, traversed by a medial transverse blackish-brown line. Hindwing: with the following small white-encircled black spots: a subbasal transverse series of three, followed by a highly curved series of eight spots, that curve across the disc of the wing to the costa and along the latter towards the base; discocellulars with a dusky short lunular line as on the forewing; terminal markings and cilia similar, but the outer and broader subterminal line more broken and macular than on the forewing. Antennae black, the shafts ringed with white; head, thorax and abdomen dark brown, with a little violet pubescence on the head and thorax; beneath: palpi, thorax and abdomen greyish white.

Female upperside: glossy brown, without any violet tint whatever; the anteciliary darker brown lines on both forewings and hindwings well marked. Underside: very similar to that of the male, the ground colour a shade darker, the markings slightly larger and more prominent. Antenna, head, thorax and abdomen as in the male, but the latter three without a trace of violet or blue on the upperside.

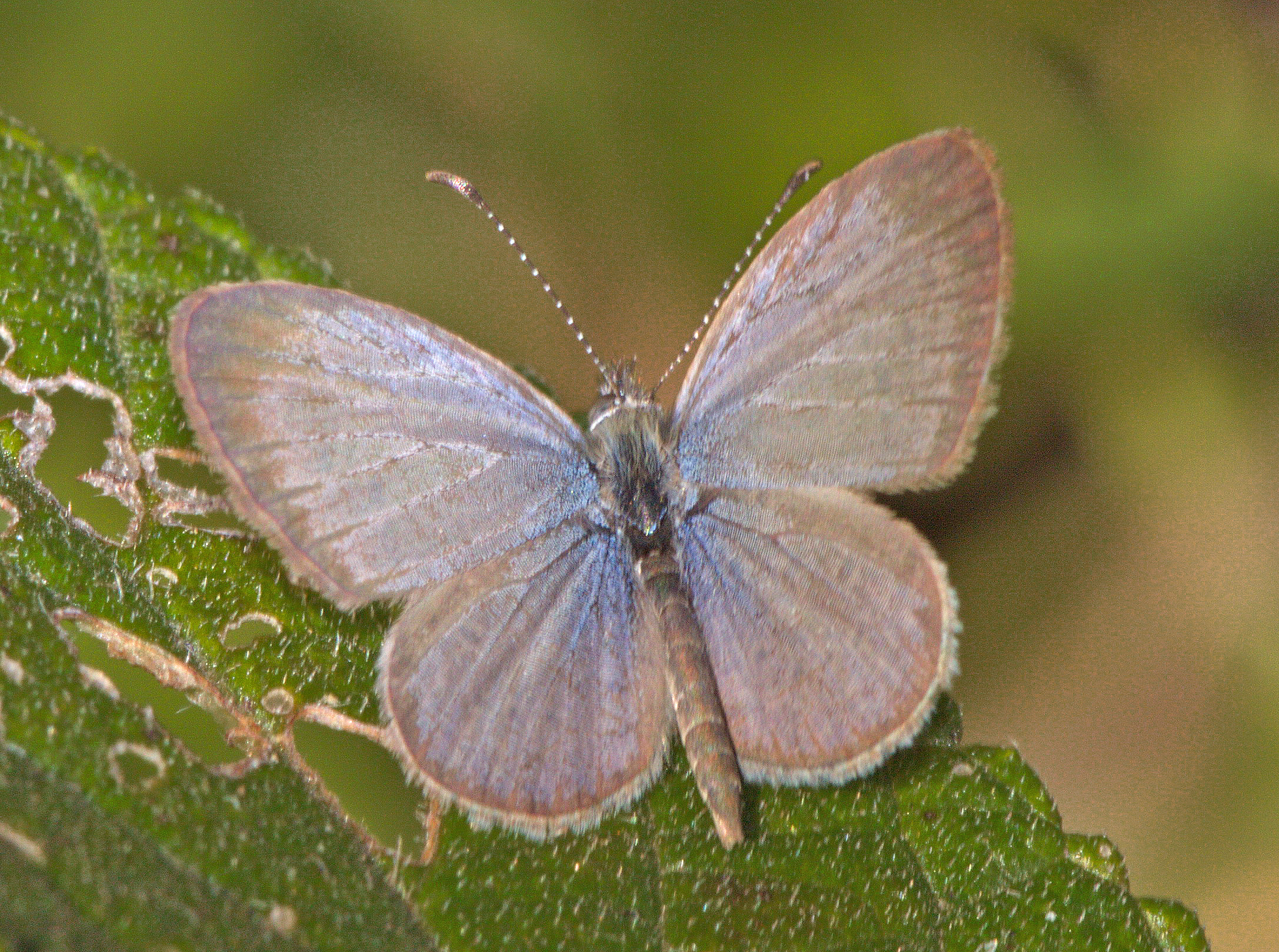
Male (upper side)

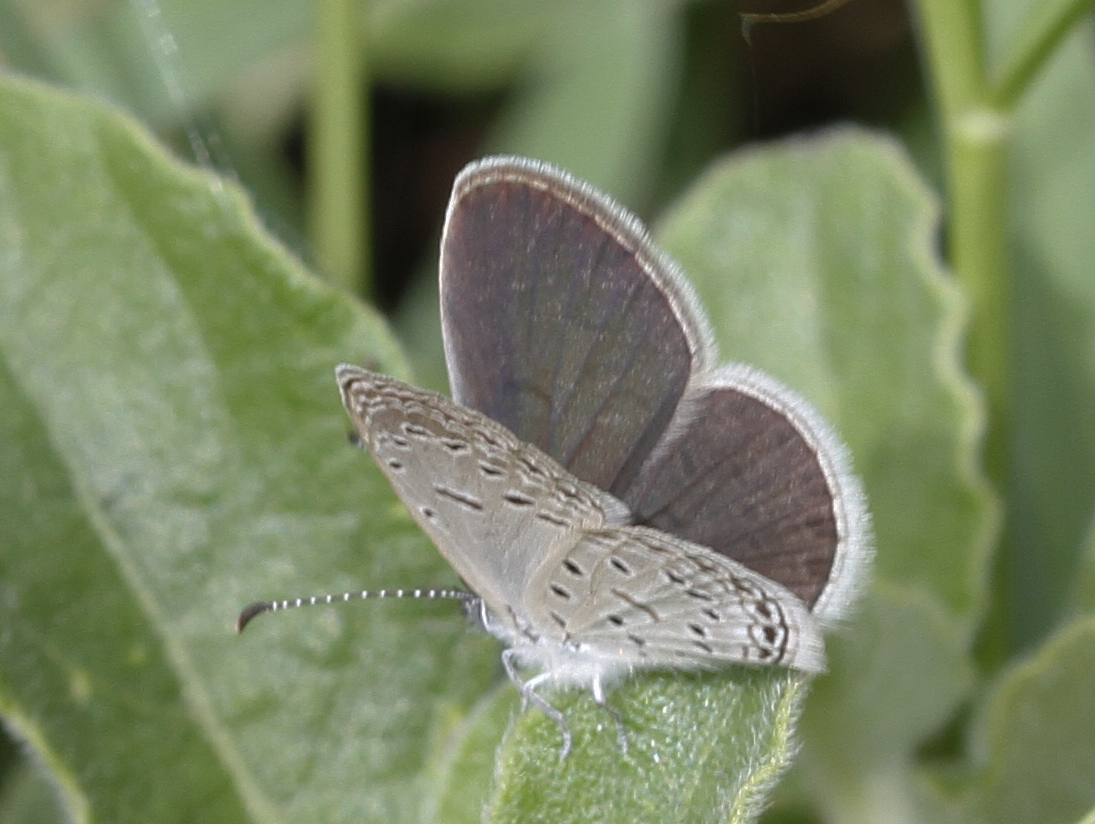
Female (upper side)

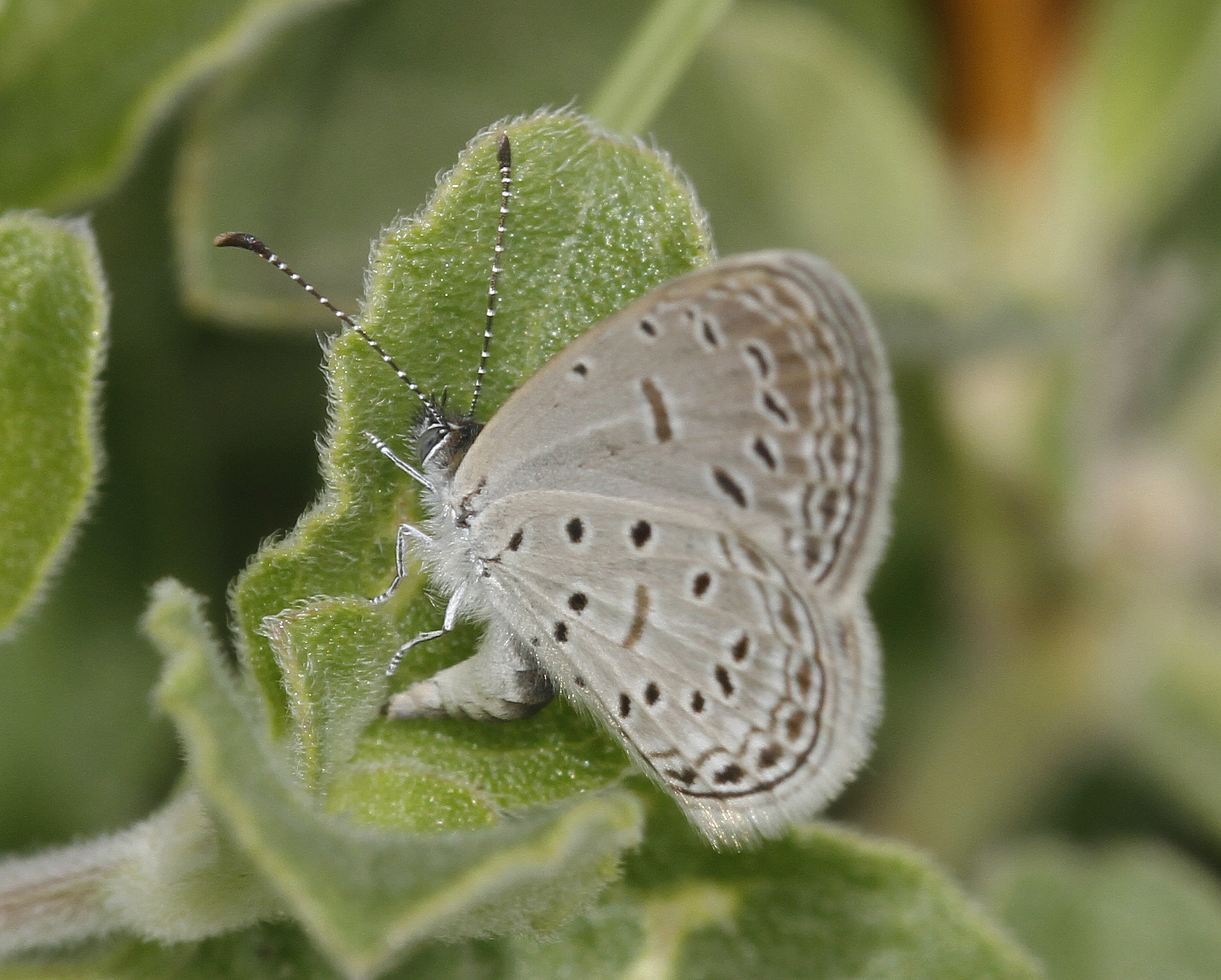
Female (underside)

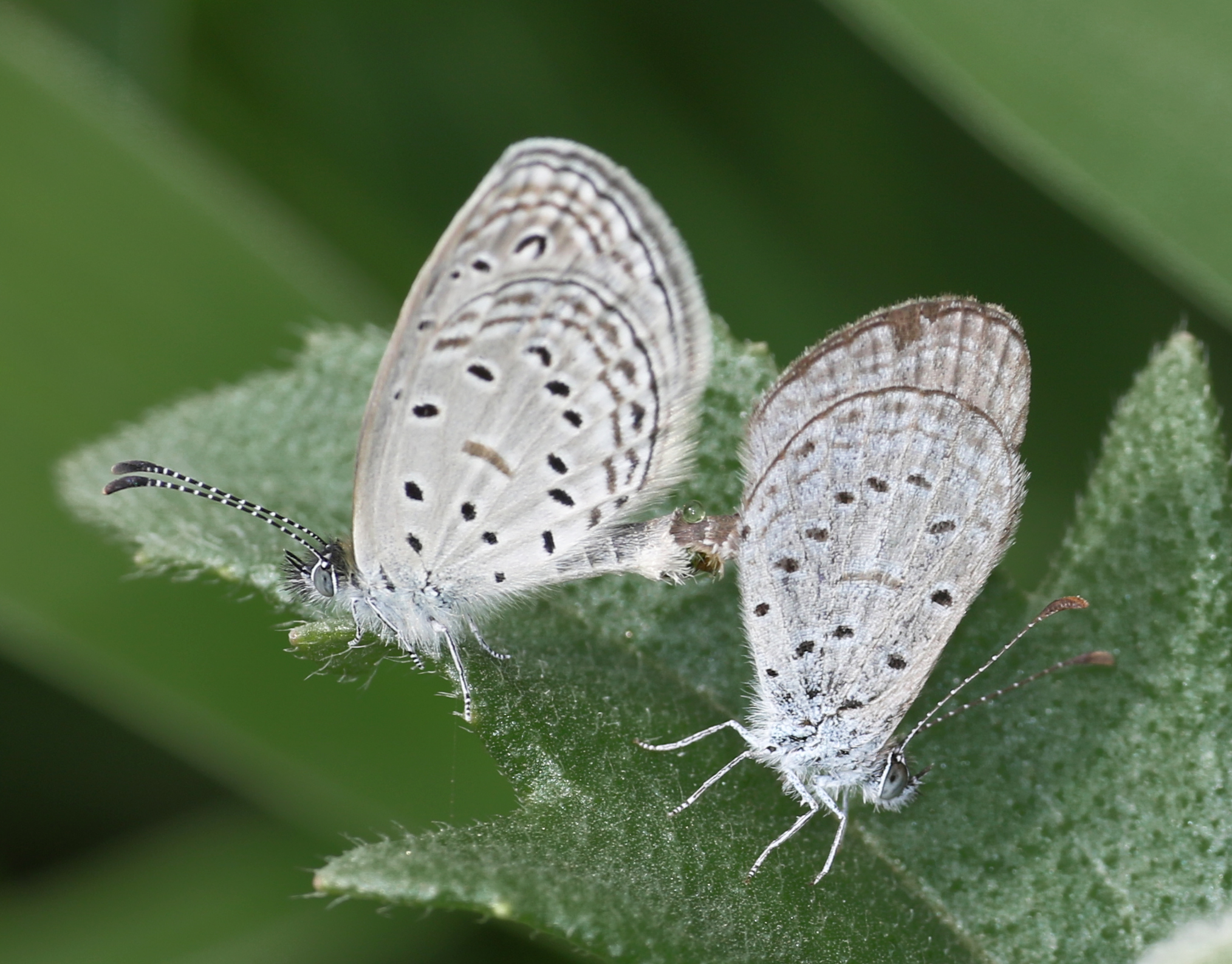
Mating pair

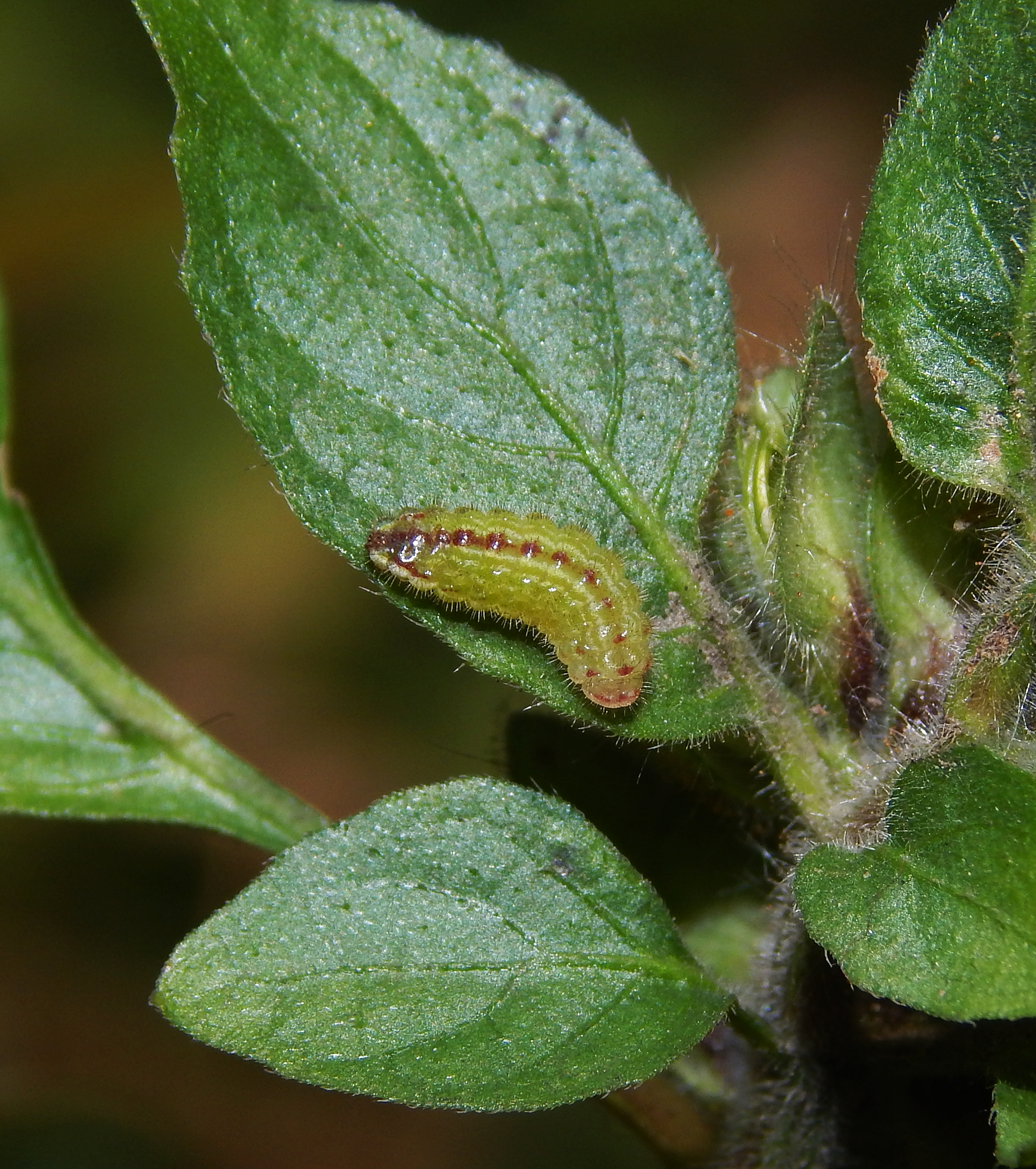
Larva

== Distribution ==
The tiny grass blue is found in several races throughout tropical and subtropical Africa, Asia, and Oceania, including India, Japan, the Philippines, Singapore, north and east coasts of Australia and also in southern Australia.

Torben Larsen developed a species numbering system for his 2005 publication Butterflies of West Africa. This species is #637. The 'Larsen' numbers have since been used with permission in A Sharp Eye on Butterflies of Ghana.

== Life history ==
The wingspan of the adults is about 1.5 centimetres (0.59 in). The eggs are pale green, round, and flattened, with a diameter of about 0.5 millimetres (0.020 in). They are laid singly on buds and flowers of a food plant. The caterpillars are 0.7 centimetres (0.28 in) long, green with a dark red line along the back, and light and dark lines partway along the sides. The sides are hairy, and the head is pale brown. The pupa is 0.7 cm long, hairy and green, and is attached to a stem or the underside of a leaf of a food plant.

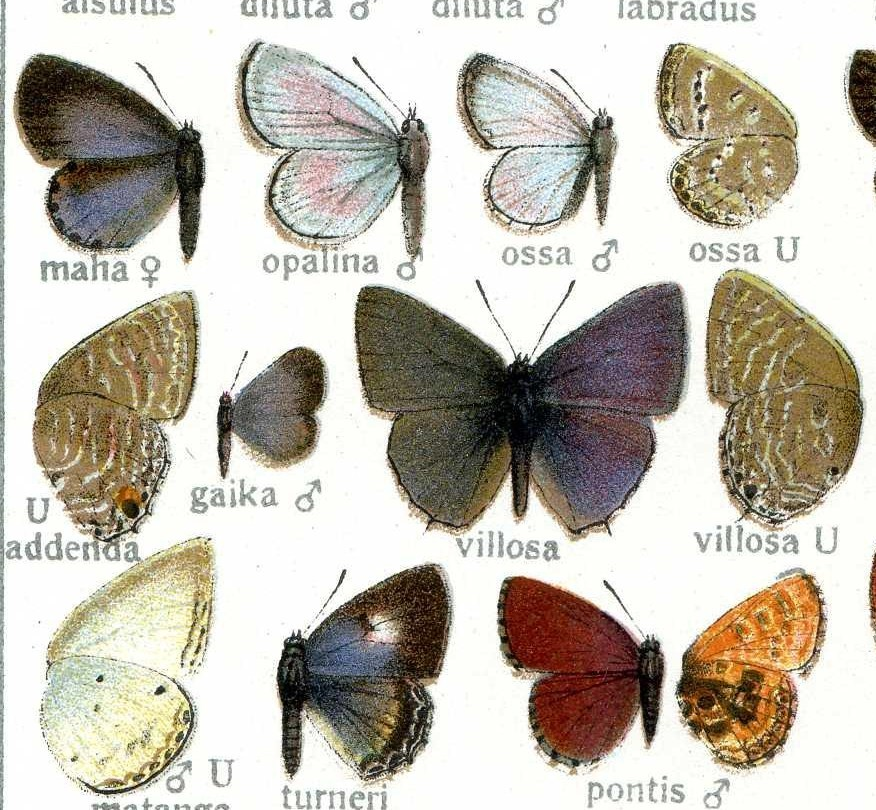
Size comparison. The next largest of this group of average-sized blues is pontis, wingspan around 2.5 cm (1.0 in). From Seitz as synonym Lycaena gaika

== Food plants ==
Food plants include various members of the family Acanthaceae. Species noted include Hygrophila auriculata and Phaulopsis dorsiflora.
