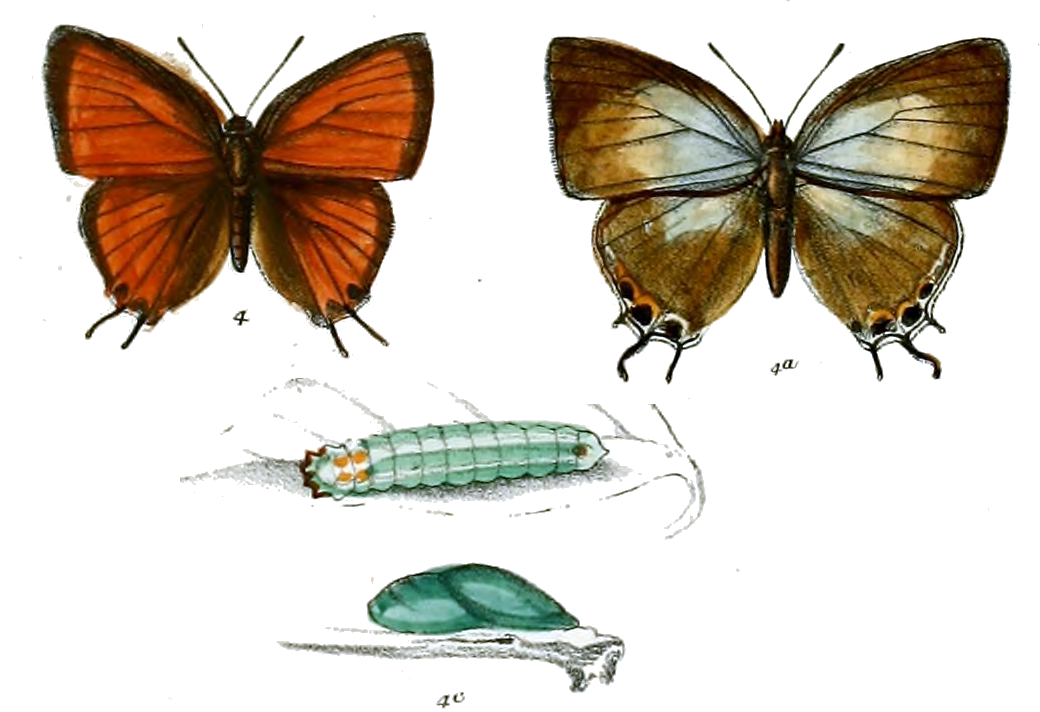
- Zesius chrysomallus

Scientific classification
- Domain: Eukaryota
- Kingdom: Animalia
- Phylum: Arthropoda
- Class: Insecta
- Order: Lepidoptera
- Family: Lycaenidae
- Tribe: Zesiini
- Genus: Zesius; Hübner, 1819

= Zesius =

Butterfly genus in family Lycaenidae

Zesius is a genus of butterflies in the family Lycaenidae.

== Species ==
- Zesius chrysomallus Hübner, 1821 - redspot
- Zesius phaeomallus Hübner, [1819-1821] Type locality: "Suriname".
