= Zetona =

Zetona delospila

Scientific classification
- Kingdom: Animalia
- Phylum: Arthropoda
- Clade: Pancrustacea
- Class: Insecta
- Order: Lepidoptera
- Family: Lycaenidae
- Tribe: Candalidini
- Genus: Zetona; Waterhouse, 1938
- Species: Z. delospila

Binomial name
- Zetona delospila (Waterhouse, 1903)

Synonyms
- Zizera delospila Waterhouse, 1903; Candalides delospila

Monotypic butterfly genus in family Lycaenidae

Zetona is a genus of butterflies in the family Lycaenidae. The single member of this genus, Zetona delospila, the clear-spotted blue or satin blue, is found in Australia in the northern part of the state of Western Australia, the northern parts of the Northern Territory and Queensland.

The wingspan is about 20 mm.
