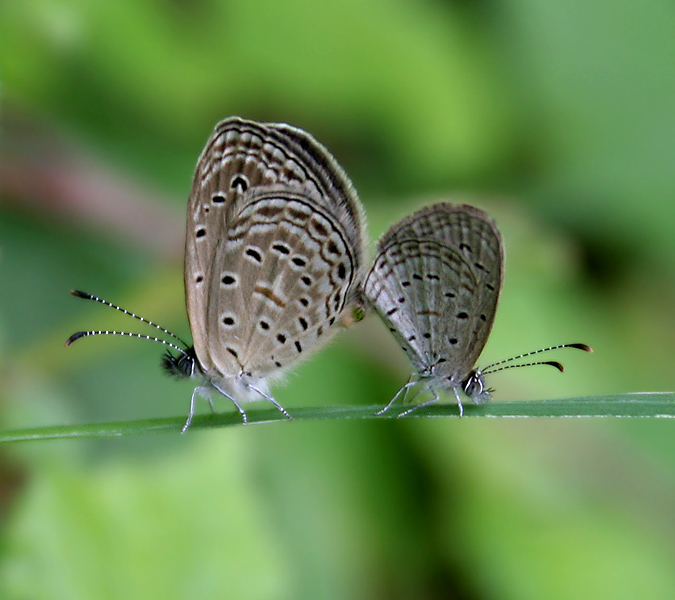
- Tiny grass blue, Zizula hylax

Scientific classification
- Domain: Eukaryota
- Kingdom: Animalia
- Phylum: Arthropoda
- Class: Insecta
- Order: Lepidoptera
- Family: Lycaenidae
- Subfamily: Polyommatinae
- Tribe: Polyommatini
- Genus: Zizula; Chapman, 1910

Species
- Two, see text

= Zizula =

Butterfly genus in family Lycaenidae

Zizula, commonly called grass blues, is a genus of butterflies in the family Lycaenidae.

== Species ==
There are two species:

- Zizula cyna (Edwards, 1881) – tiny blue, cyna blue
  - = Lycaena tulliola Godman & Salvin, 1887
  - = Lycaena mela Strecker, 1900
- Zizula hylax (Fabricius, 1775) – little grass blue
  - =Zizula gaika, originally Lycaena gaika (Trimen, 1862) – South Africa
  - =Lycaena mylica Guenée, 1863 - Réunion
  - =Lycaena cleodora Walker, 1870 - Egypt
  - =Lycaena perparva Saalmüller, 1884 - Madagascar

=== Subspecies ===
- Zizula hylax attenuata (Lucas, 1890) - Australia
- Zizula hylax dampierensis (Rothschild, 1915) - Dampier Is.
- Zizula hylax hylax (Fabricius, 1775) - India, Tranquebar
- Zizula hylax pygmea (Snellen, 1876) - Java – pygmy grass blue

=== Notes ===
- In 1967, ICZN published a ruling on the type species of Pithecops Horsfield, [1818] in favour of a proposal by Cowan, 1965. This effectively recognised the syntype of Papilio hylax Fabr. found in Copenhagen, and validated Zizula hylax as the correct name for the taxon also known as Lycaena gaika Trimen. Savela, in Funet, and Williams in Afrotropical butterflies, as well as earlier south-east Asian references use Fabricius' name hylax as the designation of the taxon. Zizula gaika is reduced to a synonym of hylax by Cowan's proposal and the CZN opinion. Horsfield's use [1928] of the combination Pithecops hylax is shown by Cowan to be a misidentification.
- Lepindex includes a card for Zizula escalantiana Descimon et al., 1973, which appears erroneous. The taxon escalantiana was described in 1973 by Stoffel & Mast, and is a Nymphalid butterfly in the tribe Preponini. See Lamas, 2004. The Lepindex card includes confirmatory information that escalantiana was described in Prepona Boisduval, 1836, and originates from Mexico. According to Lamas, escalantiana is a subjective synonym of Prepona deiphile (Godart, [1824]).
