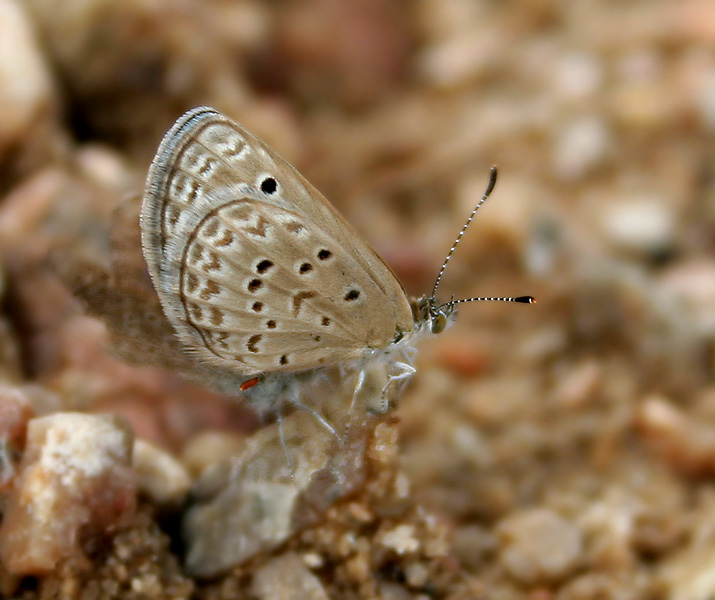
- Lesser grass blue (Zizina otis)

Scientific classification
- Domain: Eukaryota
- Kingdom: Animalia
- Phylum: Arthropoda
- Class: Insecta
- Order: Lepidoptera
- Family: Lycaenidae
- Subfamily: Polyommatinae
- Tribe: Polyommatini
- Genus: Zizina; Chapman, 1910

= Zizina =

Butterfly genus in family Lycaenidae

Zizina is a genus of gossamer-winged butterflies (Lycaenidae) in the subfamily Polyommatinae.

== Species ==
- Zizina antanossa (Mabille, 1877) – dark grass blue or clover blue
- ?Zizina emelina
- Zizina labradus (Godart, [1824]) – common grass blue, grass blue, or clover blue
- Zizina otis (Fabricius, 1787) – lesser grass blue
- Zizina oxleyi (C. & R. Felder, [1865])
- ?Zizina similus
