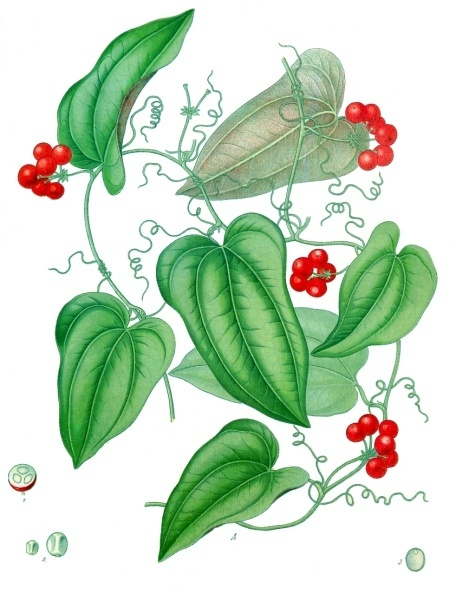
- gray sarsaparilla

Scientific classification
- Kingdom: Plantae
- Clade: Tracheophytes
- Clade: Angiosperms
- Clade: Monocots
- Order: Liliales
- Family: Smilacaceae
- Genus: Smilax
- Species: S. aristolochiifolia

Binomial name
- Smilax aristolochiifolia Mill.

Synonyms
- Smilax kerberi F.W.Apt; Smilax medica Schltdl. & Cham.

= Smilax aristolochiifolia =

Species of flowering plant

Smilax aristolochiifolia, also known as gray sarsaparilla, Mexican sarsaparilla, or sarsaparilla, is a species in the genus Smilax and the family Smilacaceae, native to Mexico and Central America. It is widely used as traditional medicine to treat many symptoms.

== Description ==
Sarsaparilla is a perennial woody climber with tendrils, thin branches and extended ovate leaves that grows about 4 to 5 meters vertically. Its paper-like leaves are pinnate veined, leathery and alternatively arranged. The leaves' width ranges from 10 to 30 cm and the petioles' length is about 5 cm. It is known for its small red berries with 2 or 3 seeds and small green flowers. The flowers are radially symmetrical, dioecious and have umbel inflorescence of 12 flowers. The berries are produced in the fall or in the late summer and stays intact through the winter for animals and birds to eat. Thus the pollination occurs as the unharmed seeds are found in the feces. The surface of the stem is smooth; it also is bent and have thorns at the joints. The hairy roots of sarsaparilla are fibrous and may have few rootlets growing out. They have stiff surface and are deep-rooted, which grows from 2 to 2.5 meters. The color of the roots ranges from brownish gray to black. Sarsaparilla is a persistent plant; even when most roots are cut off from the stem, roots will grow few years later but will be slender and less starchy.

== Habitat ==
Sarsaparilla is common in wooded areas because it uses its tendrils to climb up trees. It is widely found in temperate, swampy and warm areas. Sarsaparilla is also found at high elevations; in Nuevo León, Mexico, it is found at an elevation of 1760 meters, in Oaxaca at 100 meters, in Hacienda San José, Santa Ana at 850 to 1100 meters.

== Distribution ==
Smilax aristolochiifolia is native to Mexico and Central America. Sarsaparilla is native to the Mesoamerica region, especially in Belize, El Salvador and Guatemala. In North America, sarsaparilla originates in Southern Mexico, being found primarily in the states of Tabasco, Veracruz, Yucatán, Nuevo León, Puebla, Oaxaca, and Quintana Roo. In El Salvador, sarsaparilla is located in Hacienda San José, Santa Ana.

== Usage ==
=== Food ===
Its roots are extracted to be used in flavoring beverages, dairy desserts, baked goods and candies. Sarsaparilla was once a main ingredient for flavoring root beer. However, the taste of the root extract itself is sweet and bitter.

=== Medicinal ===
Smilax aristolochiifolia root has extensive uses in traditional medicine, where it is used for leprosy, tumors, cancer, psoriasis and rheumatism. It is also used as tonic for anemia and skin diseases. It is reported to have anti-inflammatory, testosterogenic, aphrodisiac, and progesterogenic effects. Therefore, sarsaparilla roots are often promoted as male rejuvenator. Not only that but it was used to build lean body mass by some gym enthusiasts. Also it is believed to improve digestion and arouse appetite. Natives in New Guinea use the stem of sarsaparilla as treatment for toothache. However, no definite scientific evidence is given to support the putative medicinal effects of sarsaparilla and in excessive doses, it can be harmful.

== Active chemicals ==
Sarsaparilla roots has saponins which are used to synthesize cortisone and other steroids. Saponins are known to help the body absorb other drugs more effectively. However, they are plant steroids and it is believed they cannot be absorbed or used in human body. It also has organic acids, flavonoids, sitosterol and stigmasterol. Main chemicals of sarsaparilla are acetyl-parigenin, astilbin, beta-sitosterol, caffeoyl-shikimic acids, dihydroquercetin, diosgenin, engeletin, essential oils, epsilon-sitosterol, eucryphin, eurryphin, ferulic acid, glucopyranosides, isoastilbin, isoengetitin, kaempferol, parigenin, parillin, pollinastanol, resveratrol, rhamnose, saponin, sarasaponin, sarsaparilloside, sarsaponin, sarsasapogenin, shikimic acid, sitosterol-d-glucoside, smilagenin, smilasaponin, smilax saponins A-C, smiglaside A-E, smitilbin, stigmasterol, taxifolin, and titogenin.

== Name ==
It is also known as Smilax medica and Smilax aristolochiaefolia. Spanish common names include zarzaparrilla, cocolmeca and alambrilla. The name Sarsaparilla means a small bushed vine, from Spanish words zarza (bramble or bush), parra (vine), and illa (small).
