= C21H22O11 =

The molecular formula C_{21}H_{22}O_{11} (molar mass: 450.39 g/mol, exact mass: 450.116212) may refer to:

- Astilbin, a flavanonol
- Marein, an aurone
- Smitilbin, a flavanonol
