= Kohki tea =

Chinese/Japanese herbal drink

Kohki tea (黄杞茶) or Huang Qi Tea is a Chinese/Japanese herbal drink very high in antioxidant activity. Kohki tea has been sold over the counter for centuries and is standardized to contain astilbin and taxifolin.

Astilbin can be isolated from Kohki tea processed from Engelhardtia chrysolepis (huang-qi).
