= Dihydrogossypetin =

Names
- IUPAC name (2R,3R)-3,3′,4′,5,7,8-Hexahydroxyflavan-4-one
- Systematic IUPAC name (2R,3R)-2-(3,4-Dihydroxyphenyl)-3,5,7,8-tetrahydroxy-2,3-dihydro-4H-1-benzopyran-4-one
- Other names 2,3-Dihydrogossypetin; 3′,4′,5,7,8-pentahydroxyflavanonol

Identifiers
CAS Number	489-35-0
3D model (JSmol)	Interactive image
ChEBI	CHEBI:16965
ChemSpider	4573761
PubChem CID	5460097
UNII	SET4M23ZTM
CompTox Dashboard (EPA)	DTXSID801125976
- InChI: InChI=1S/C15H12O8/c16-6-2-1-5(3-7(6)17)14-13(22)12(21)10-8(18)4-9(19)11(20)15(10)23-14/h1-4,13-14,16-20,22H/t13-,14+/m0/s1 Key: ZHPLPRUARZZBET-UONOGXRCSA-N
- SMILES: C1=CC(=C(C=C1C2C(C(=O)C3=C(O2)C(=C(C=C3O)O)O)O)O)OC1=CC(=C(C=C1[C@@H]2C(C(=O)C3=C(O2)C(=C(C=C3O)O)O)O)O)O

Properties
Chemical formula	C_{15}H_{12}O_{8}
Molar mass	320.25 g/mol
- Except where otherwise noted, data are given for materials in their standard state (at 25 °C [77 °F], 100 kPa). Infobox references

Dihydrogossypetin is a flavanonol, a type of flavonoid.

== Biosynthesis ==
The enzyme taxifolin 8-monooxygenase hydroxylates the flavanonol, taxifolin, using nicotinamide adenine dinucleotide (NADH) and molecular oxygen to produce 2,3-dihydrogossypetin.

taxifolin
+ NADH + H^{+}
O_{2}
H_{2}O
dihydrogossypetin
+ NAD^{+}
