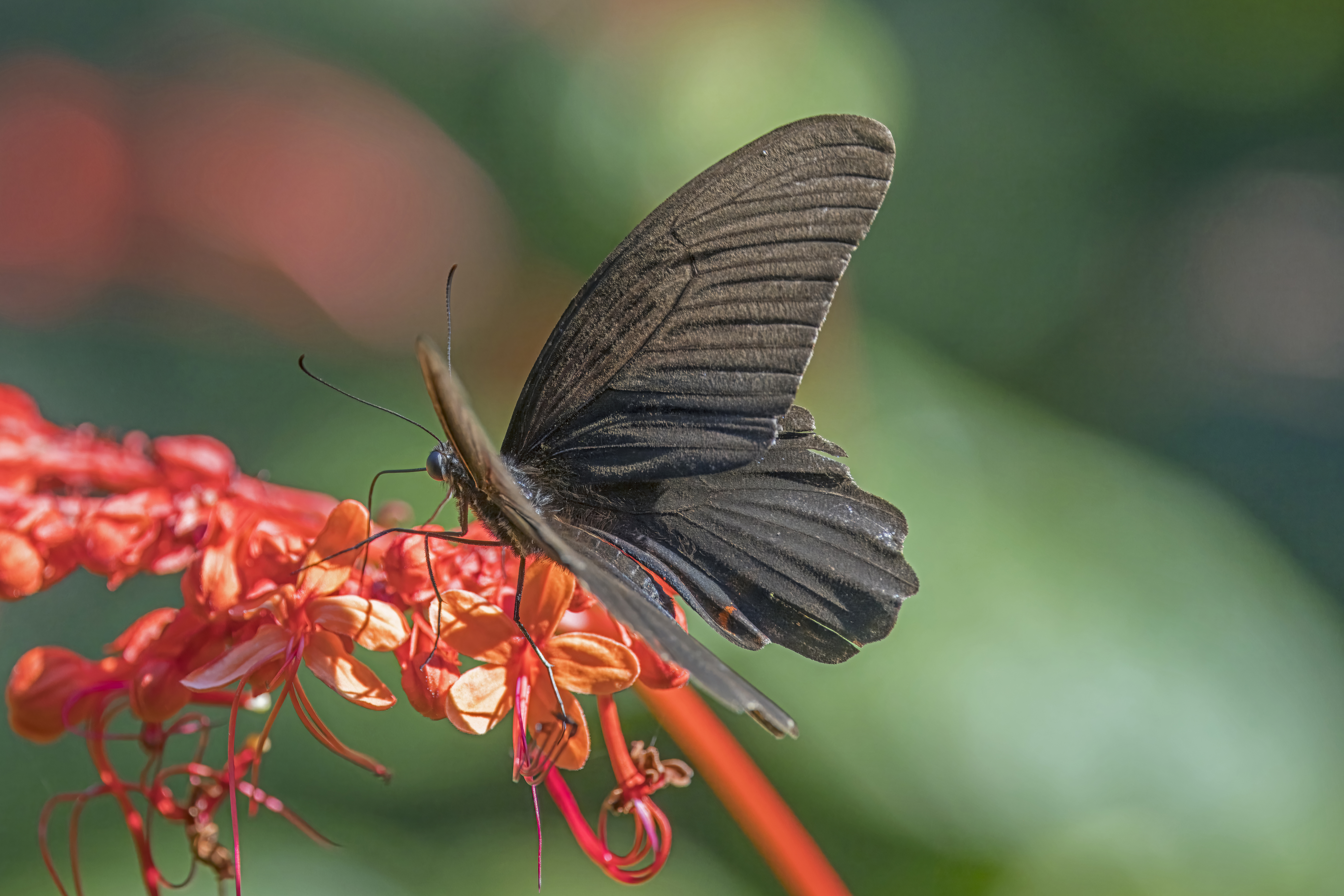
- P. p. protenor, Taiwan
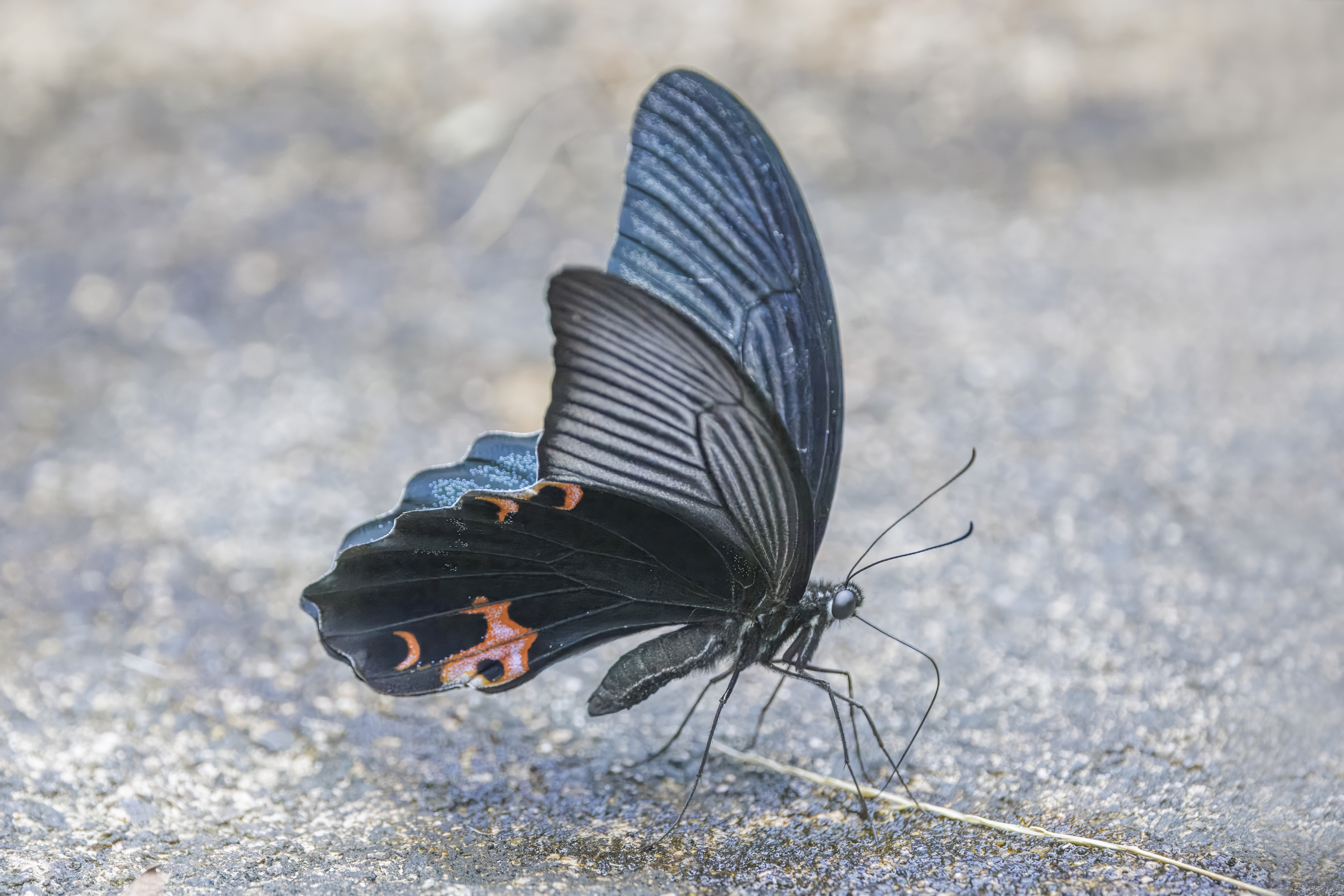
- Himalayan spangle P. p. euprotenor, Hong Kong

Scientific classification
- Kingdom: Animalia
- Phylum: Arthropoda
- Clade: Pancrustacea
- Class: Insecta
- Order: Lepidoptera
- Family: Papilionidae
- Genus: Papilio
- Species: P. protenor

Binomial name
- Papilio protenor Cramer, 1775

= Papilio protenor =

Spangle

Species of butterfly

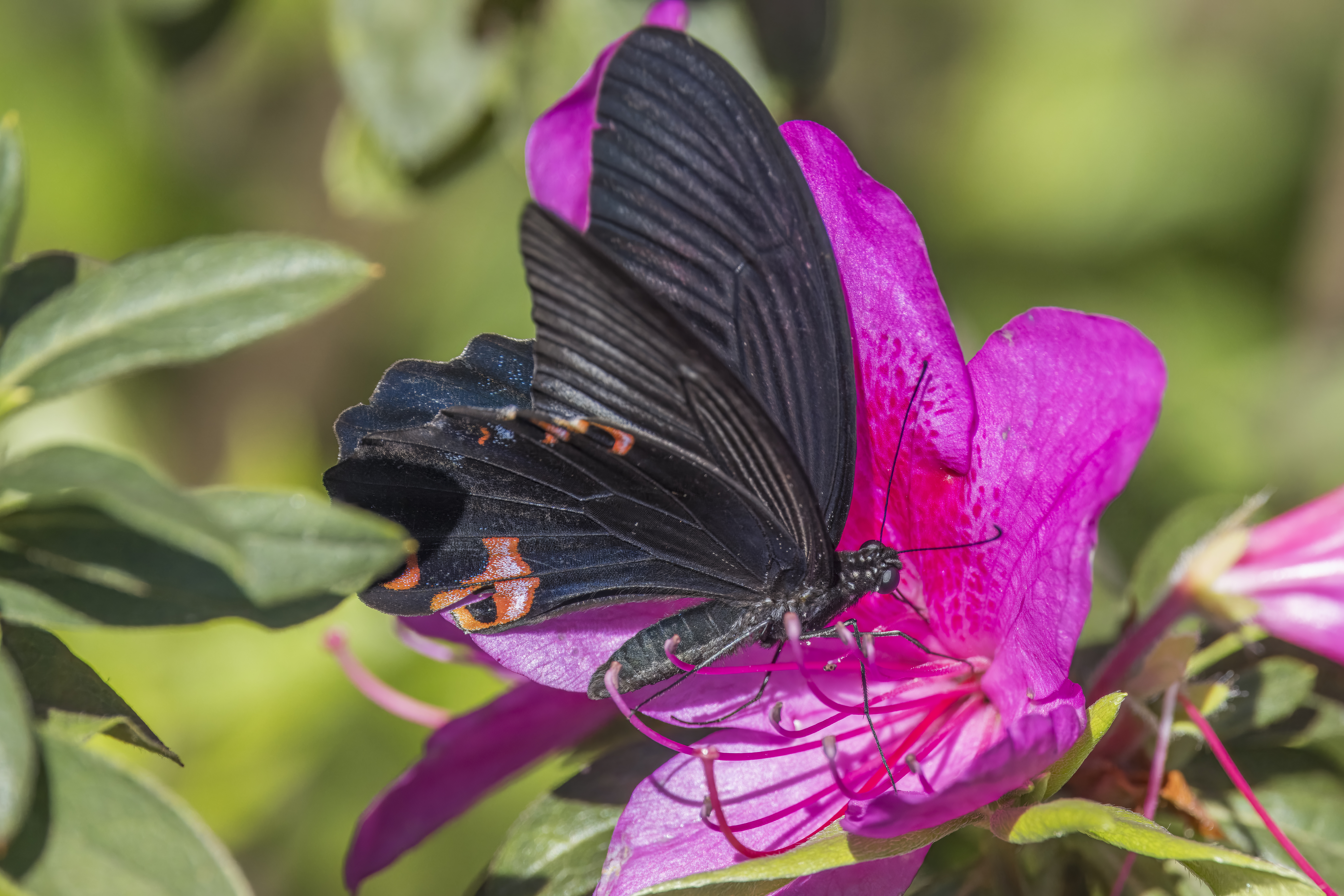
P. p. protenor, on Azalea

Papilio protenor, the spangle, is a large butterfly found in South East Asia belonging to the swallowtail family.

== Morphology ==
=== Male ===
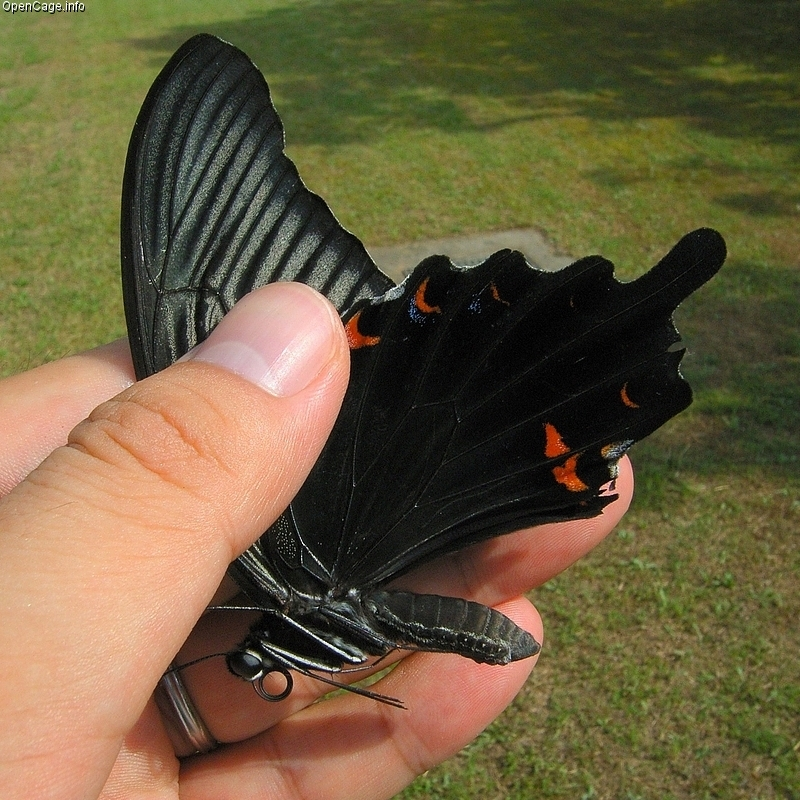
Papilio protenor demetrius

Upperside: velvety indigo-blue black, duller on the forewing than on the hindwing. Forewing with pale adnervular streaks broadened along the terminal margin and extended well into the cell. Hindwing: a broad pale yellowish-white subcostal streak; interspaces 4 to 6 irrorated (sprinkled) with bluish scales; tornal angle marked with red.

Underside: forewing dull black; adnervular streaks distinctly grey and much broader than on the upperside. Hindwing: ground colour as on the upperside, a large irregularly-shaped patch at the tornal angle that extends into interspace 2, and subterminal lunules in interspaces 2, 6, and 7 dull pinkish-red, cell irrorated more-or-less with a sprinkling of blue scales; the tornal patch with a black, outwardly blue-edged, round medial spot, and interspaces 4 and 5 with subterminal irrorations of blue scales. Antennae black; head, thorax and abdomen dark brownish-black.

=== Female ===
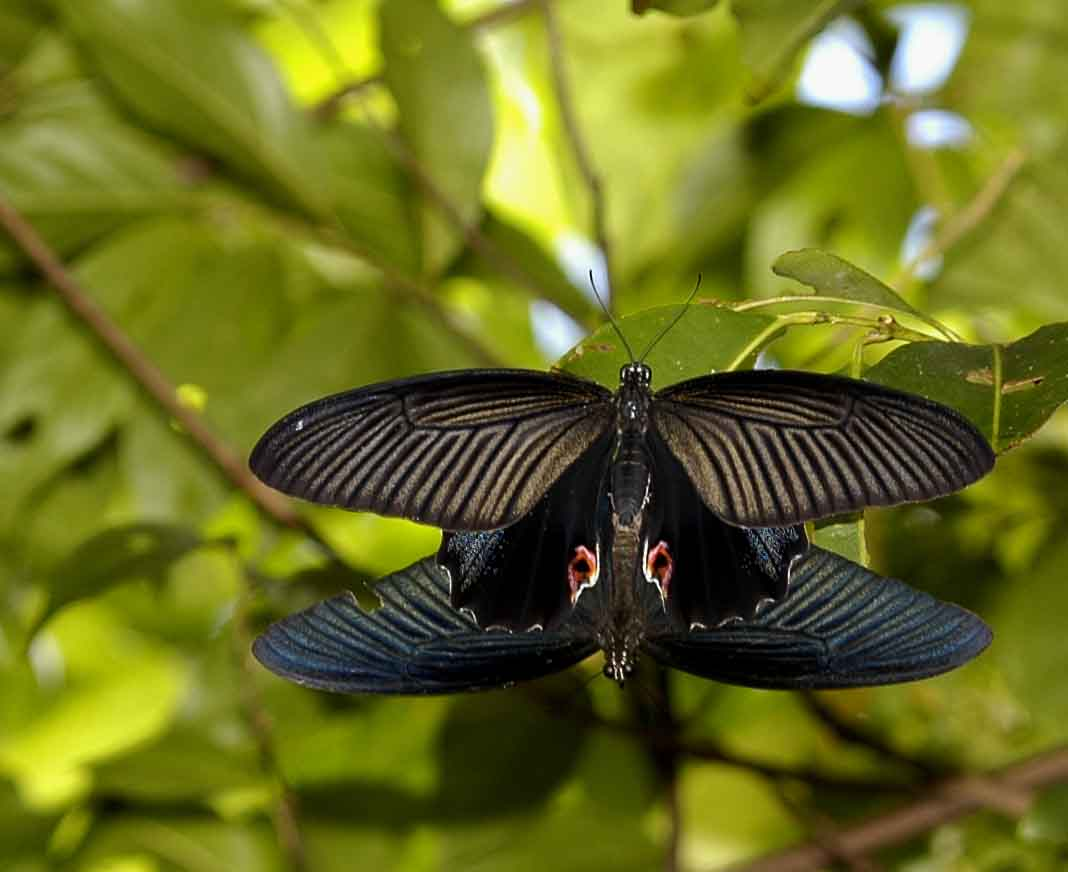
Spangles mating

Similar to male.

Upperside: ground colour deep brownish-black; adnervular streaks on forewing yellowish; irroration of blue scales on outer portions of hindwing more dense; no white subcostal streak; red patch at tornal angle large with an oval medial black spot; another similar black spot subterminally in interspace 2 posteriorly bordered by a crescent-shaped red mark.

Underside: similar to that in the male, differs in the adnervular streaks on the forewing that are broader and paler; on the hindwing the tornal red patch is paler and larger, and is extended broadly anteriorly and outwards towards the termen into interspace 2; in the latter it coalesces with a broad subterminal black-centred red ocellus; the irroration of blue scales in interspace 5 with a small subterminal red lunule below it. Antennae, head, thorax and abdomen as in the male.

=== Sexual Dimorphism ===
Scientists have found that between the male and female, there are higher amounts of linalool and 2,3-butanediol present in the male than in the female. The male also elicits stronger odour than female.

== Range ==
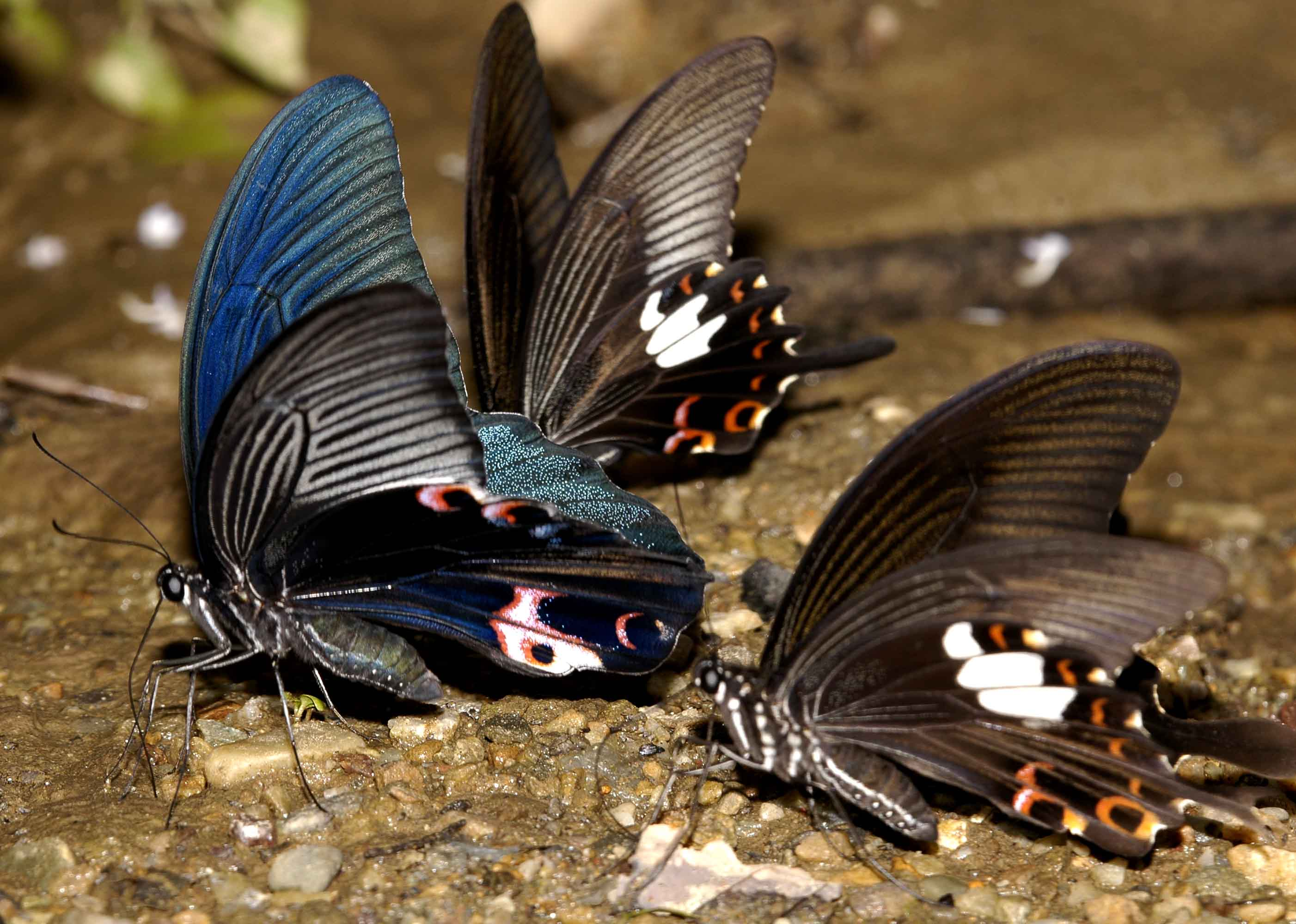
Spangle mud-puddling with red Helens.

Northern Pakistan, Jammu and Kashmir, Garhwal Himalaya (Govind Wildlife Sanctuary), Sikkim, Assam, Bangladesh, Burma, southern China (including Hainan), Vietnam, northern Laos, Taiwan, North Korea, South Korea and Japan.Nepal

== Habitat ==
Many species of butterfly occupy only a limited range of the host plant. They utilize the plant chemicals to assess potential host plants and decide if or not to oviposit on them. Most species in the genus Papilio exclusively use rutaceous plants (rutaceae) as host plant, and Papilio protenor is a specialist. Their major host plant is citrus. Research indicates high affinity of the female for Citrus unshiu. There are various oviposition stimulants discovered, including sugar acid, amino acid, alkaloid and flavonoid. Flavanone glycosides such as naringin and hesperidin were investigated and both elicited positive responses from the female adults.

Females do not oviposit on Phellodendron amurense. The avoidance is attributed to high concentration of phellamurin.

Researchers have found different adaptation to different host plants between adult females and larvae. For example, females are able to oviposit on Trollius asiaticus, but larvae fail to grow on it. Also, while the female adults are not able to oviposit on Phellodendron amurense, larvae are found to be able to live on it.

Papilio protenor males appear to be more site faithful than females.

== Status ==
Common; not threatened.

== Life history ==
=== Larva ===
"Green, with a yellow collar and brown lichen-like markings. Feeds on Zanthoxylum alatum." (Mackinnon, quoted in Bingham.)

Experiments have been conducted on larvae of different instars, and it is revealed that among all the different instars, there are significant differences of chemical composition of osmeterial secretion between the 5th instar and all the previous instars. 5th larvae secretion is mainly aliphatic acid and their esters, while the previous instars contain primarily mono- and sesquiterpenoids. Scientists suspect that these differences are associated with the colouration of the 4th larval ecdysis.

=== Pupa ===
"Some pupae are coloured like rough bark, others are uniformly green." (Mackinnon, quoted in Bingham.)

There are two colour-types in Papilio butterflies, green and brown. Pupae that grow on green-coloured branches are always green, while those that live on dead branches are brown in colour. Light condition does not seem to affect this relation. The green pigment is described as a "insectoverdin" type, which means it is a mixture of yellow and blue chromoproteins. The chemical compounds separated from the green pupae (e.g., beta-carotene and lutein) were not found in the brown pupae; however, the bile pigment from the blue chromoprotein was found in the brown pupae, but with a lower percentage than in the green ones.

Papilio species' pupal colour is determined generally by their surrounding environment. There are physical factors such as pupal width and texture, and external factors such as humidity and food. Research indicates that there is not one major determinant, but the colouration is due to reciprocal balance of all sorts of environmental stimuli.

== Cultural references ==
- In March 1987 North Korea issued a postage stamp depicting Papilio protenor.

== See also ==
- Papilionidae
- List of butterflies of India
- List of butterflies of India (Papilionidae)
