= Kohki =

Kohki may refer to:

- Kōki (given name), a masculine Japanese given name
- Kohki tea, a Japanese herbal drink very high in antioxidant activity
