= Leucopelargonidin =

Names
- IUPAC name (2R,3S,4S)-Flavan-3,4,4′,5,7-pentol
- Systematic IUPAC name (2R,3S,4S)-2-(4-Hydroxyphenyl)-3,4-dihydro-2H-1-benzopyran-3,4,5,7-tetrol
- Other names (+)-Leucopelargonidin cis-3,4-Leucopelargonidin; Leucopelargonidine

Identifiers
CAS Number	98919-66-5
3D model (JSmol)	Interactive image
ChEBI	CHEBI:17343
ChemSpider	389080
KEGG	C03648
PubChem CID	440073
UNII	S3K37SML4S
CompTox Dashboard (EPA)	DTXSID901147941 DTXSID20966331, DTXSID901147941
- InChI: InChI=1S/C15H14O6/c16-8-3-1-7(2-4-8)15-14(20)13(19)12-10(18)5-9(17)6-11(12)21-15/h1-6,13-20H/t13-,14-,15+/m0/s1 Key: FSVMLWOLZHGCQX-SOUVJXGZSA-N
- SMILES: c1cc(ccc1[C@@H]2[C@H]([C@H](c3c(cc(cc3O2)O)O)O)O)O

Properties
Chemical formula	C_{15}H_{14}O_{6}
Molar mass	290.271 g·mol^{−1}
- Except where otherwise noted, data are given for materials in their standard state (at 25 °C [77 °F], 100 kPa). Infobox references

Leucopelargonidin is a colorless chemical compound related to leucoanthocyanins. It can be found in Albizia lebbeck (East Indian walnut), in the fruit of Anacardium occidentale (Cashew), in the fruit of Areca catechu (Areca nut), in the fruit of Hydnocarpus wightianus (Hindi Chaulmoogra), in the rhizome of Rumex hymenosepalus (Arizona dock), in Zea mays (Corn) and in Ziziphus jujuba (Chinese date).

== Biosynthesis ==
In flavonoid biosynthesis in plants, the enzyme dihydrokaempferol 4-reductase converts aromadendrin to leucopelargonidin, using nicotinamide adenine dinucleotide phosphate (NADPH) as its cofactor.

aromadendrin
+ NADPH
H^{+}
leucopelargonidin
+ NADP^{+}

Leucopelargonidin can also be synthesized from aromadendrin in the laboratory by sodium borohydride reduction.

== Metabolism ==
Leucoanthocyanidin reductase transforms leucopelargonidin into afzelechin.

leucopelargonidin
+ NADPH
H^{+}
H_{2}O
afzelechin
+ NADP^{+}
