= Engeletin =

- Chemical structure of engeletin

Names
- IUPAC name (2R,3R)-4′,5,7-Trihydroxy-3-(α-L-rhamnopyranosyloxy)flavan-4-one
- Preferred IUPAC name (2R,3R)-5,7-Dihydroxy-2-(4-hydroxyphenyl)-3-{[(2S,3R,4R,5R,6S)-3,4,5-trihydroxy-6-methyloxan-2-yl]oxy}-4H-1-benzopyran-4-one
- Other names dihydrokaempferol 3-rhamnoside Engelitin

Identifiers
CAS Number	572-31-6
3D model (JSmol)	Interactive image
PubChem CID	6453452
CompTox Dashboard (EPA)	DTXSID70972649
- InChI: InChI=1S/C21H22O10/c1-8-15(25)17(27)18(28)21(29-8)31-20-16(26)14-12(24)6-11(23)7-13(14)30-19(20)9-2-4-10(22)5-3-9/h2-8,15,17-25,27-28H,1H3/t8-,15-,17+,18+,19+,20-,21-/m0/s1 Key: VQUPQWGKORWZII-WDPYGAQVSA-N
- SMILES: CC1C(C(C(C(O1)OC2C(OC3=CC(=CC(=C3C2=O)O)O)C4=CC=C(C=C4)O)O)O)O

Properties
Chemical formula	C_{21}H_{22}O_{10}
Molar mass	434.397 g·mol^{−1}
- Except where otherwise noted, data are given for materials in their standard state (at 25 °C [77 °F], 100 kPa). verify (what is ?) Infobox references

Engeletin is a flavanonol rhamnoside, a phenolic compound found in wine and isolated from the bark of Hymenaea martiana.

== See also ==
- Phenolic compounds in wine
