= Aromadendrin =

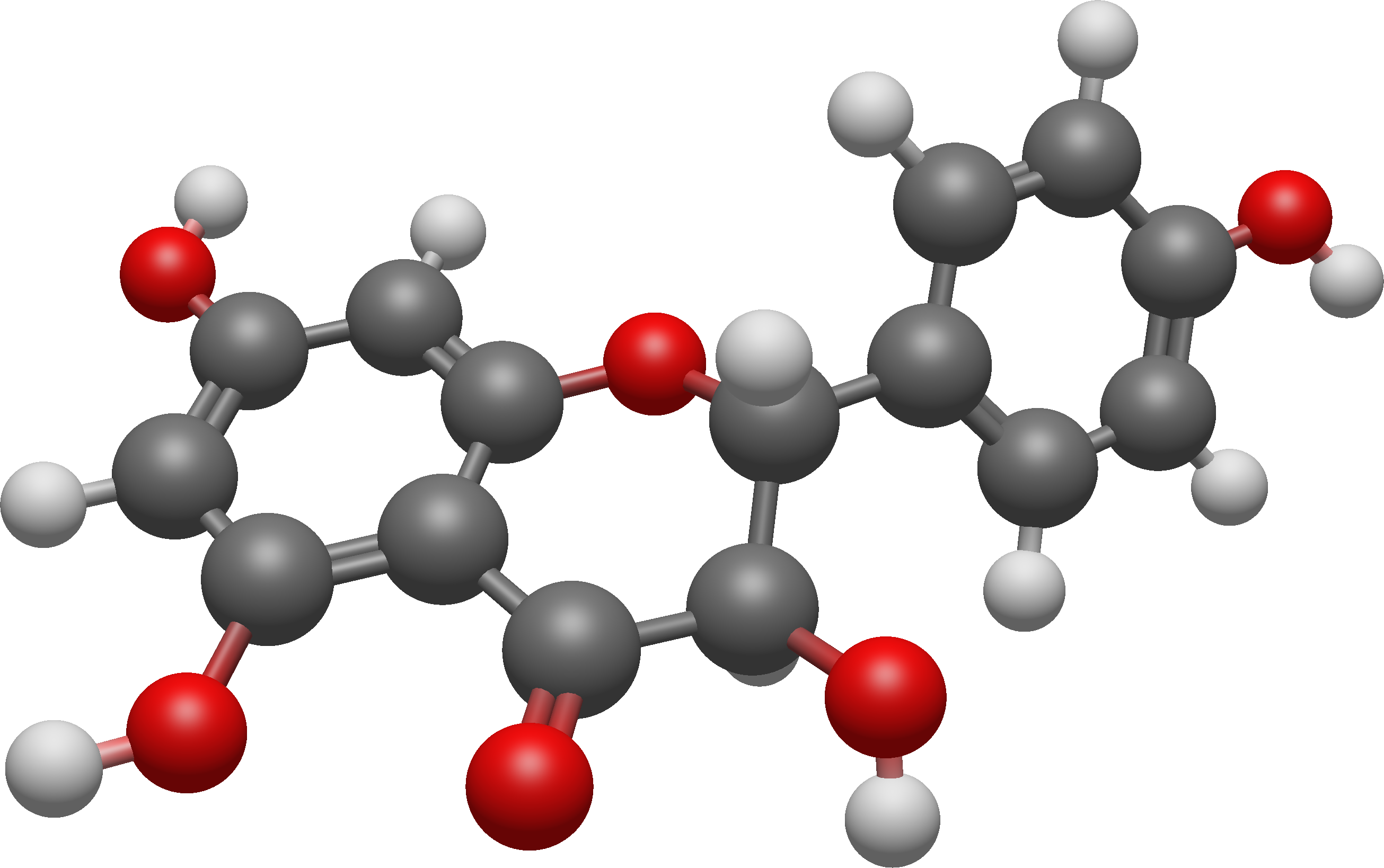

Names
- IUPAC name (2R,3R)-3,4′,5,7-Tetrahydroxyflavan-4-one
- Systematic IUPAC name (2R,3R)-3,5,7-Trihydroxy-2-(4-hydroxyphenyl)-2,3-dihydro-4H-1-benzopyran-4-one
- Other names Aromadendrin; Dihydrokaempferol; Aromadendrol (+)-Aromadendrin (+)-Dihydrokaempferol

Identifiers
CAS Number	480-20-6
3D model (JSmol)	Interactive image
ChEBI	CHEBI:15401
ChEMBL	ChEMBL9323
ChemSpider	109514
ECHA InfoCard	100.213.374
KEGG	C00974
PubChem CID	122850
UNII	7YA4640575
CompTox Dashboard (EPA)	DTXSID8075411
- InChI: InChI=1S/C15H12O6/c16-8-3-1-7(2-4-8)15-14(20)13(19)12-10(18)5-9(17)6-11(12)21-15/h1-6,14-18,20H/t14-,15+/m0/s1 Key: PADQINQHPQKXNL-LSDHHAIUSA-N
- SMILES: C1=CC(=CC=C1C2C(C(=O)C3=C(C=C(C=C3O2)O)O)O)O

Properties
Chemical formula	C_{15}H_{12}O_{6}
Molar mass	288.255 g·mol^{−1}
- Except where otherwise noted, data are given for materials in their standard state (at 25 °C [77 °F], 100 kPa). Infobox references

Aromadendrin (aromodendrin or dihydrokaempferol) is a flavanonol, a type of flavonoid. It can be found in the wood of Pinus sibirica.

== Biosynthesis ==
Flavonoid biosynthesis in plants uses a phenylpropanoid metabolic pathway in which the amino acid phenylalanine is converted to 4-coumaroyl-CoA. This is combined with three units of malonyl-CoA to yield a group of compounds called chalcones, which contain two phenyl rings. In the main pathway, the enzymes chalcone synthase and chalcone isomerase produce (S)-naringenin which is the immediate precursor for aromadendrin.

The enzyme flavanone 3-dioxygenase inserts a hydroxyl group into the dihydropyran ring:

naringenin
+ α-ketoglutaric acid
O_{2}
CO_{2}
aromadendrin
+ succinic acid

This alpha-ketoglutarate-dependent hydroxylase requires α-ketoglutaric acid, which is converted to succinic acid as a by-product.

== Metabolism ==
The enzyme dihydrokaempferol 4-reductase converts aromadendrin to leucopelargonidin, using nicotinamide adenine dinucleotide phosphate (NADPH) as its cofactor.

aromadendrin
+ NADPH
H^{+}
leucopelargonidin
+ NADP^{+}

Aromadendrin is alternatively converted to taxifolin in other pathways leading to anthocyanidins and anthocyanins.

=== Glycosides ===
(2R,3R)-trans-Aromadendrin-7-O-beta-D-glucopyranoside-6′′-(4′′′-hydroxy-2′′′-methylene butanoate) is an acylated glucoside of aromadendrin isolated from the stem bark of Afzelia bella (Fabaceae).

Phellamurin is the 8-prenyl 7-glucoside derivative of aromadendrin.

== Chemistry ==
(+)-Leucopelargonidin, can be synthesized from (+)-aromadendrin in the laboratory by sodium borohydride reduction.
