= Engelhardia danumensis =

Conservation status
- Vulnerable (IUCN 2.3)

Scientific classification
- Kingdom: Plantae
- Clade: Embryophytes
- Clade: Tracheophytes
- Clade: Angiosperms
- Clade: Eudicots
- Clade: Rosids
- Order: Fagales
- Family: Juglandaceae
- Genus: Engelhardia
- Species: E. danumensis

Binomial name
- Engelhardia danumensis E.J.F.Campb.

Species of tree

Engelhardia danumensis is a tree in the family Juglandaceae. It is named for the Danum Valley in Borneo.

== Description ==
Engelhardia danumensis grows up to 35 m (110 ft) tall, with a trunk diameter of up to 60 cm (24 in), with buttresses. The bark is dark brown. The leaves are elliptic and measure up to 7 cm (3 in) long.

== Distribution and habitat ==
Engelhardia danumensis is endemic to Borneo, where it is known only from the Ulu Segama Forest Reserve in Sabah. Its habitat is in lowland dipterocarp forests.
