= Taxifolin 8-monooxygenase =

Class of enzymes

Identifiers
- EC no.: 1.14.13.19
- CAS no.: 39307-19-2

Databases
- BRENDA: enzyme data
- ExPASy: NiceZyme view
- KEGG: enzyme entry
- MetaCyc: metabolic pathway
- Rhea: reactions
- PDB structures: RCSB PDB PDBe PDBsum
- Gene Ontology: AmiGO / QuickGO
Search
- PMC: articles
- PubMed: articles
- NCBI: proteins

Taxifolin 8-monooxygenase (EC 1.14.13.19) is an enzyme that catalyzes the chemical reaction

taxifolin
+ NADH + H^{+}
O_{2}
H_{2}O
dihydrogossypetin
+ NAD^{+}

The four substrates of this enzyme are taxifolin, reduced nicotinamide adenine dinucleotide (NADH), oxygen, and a proton. Its products are dihydrogossypetin, oxidised NAD^{+}, and water. Nicotinamide adenine dinucleotide phosphate can be used as an alternative cofactor.

The enzyme is a flavin-containing monooxygenase that uses molecular oxygen as oxidant and incorporates one of its atoms into the starting material. The systematic name of this enzyme class is phenol,NADPH:oxygen oxidoreductase (2-hydroxylating). Other names in common use include phenol hydroxylase, and phenol o-hydroxylase. It uses flavin adenine dinucleotide as a second cofactor. The systematic name of this enzyme class is taxifolin,NAD(P)H:oxygen oxidoreductase (8-hydroxylating). This enzyme is also called taxifolin hydroxylase.
