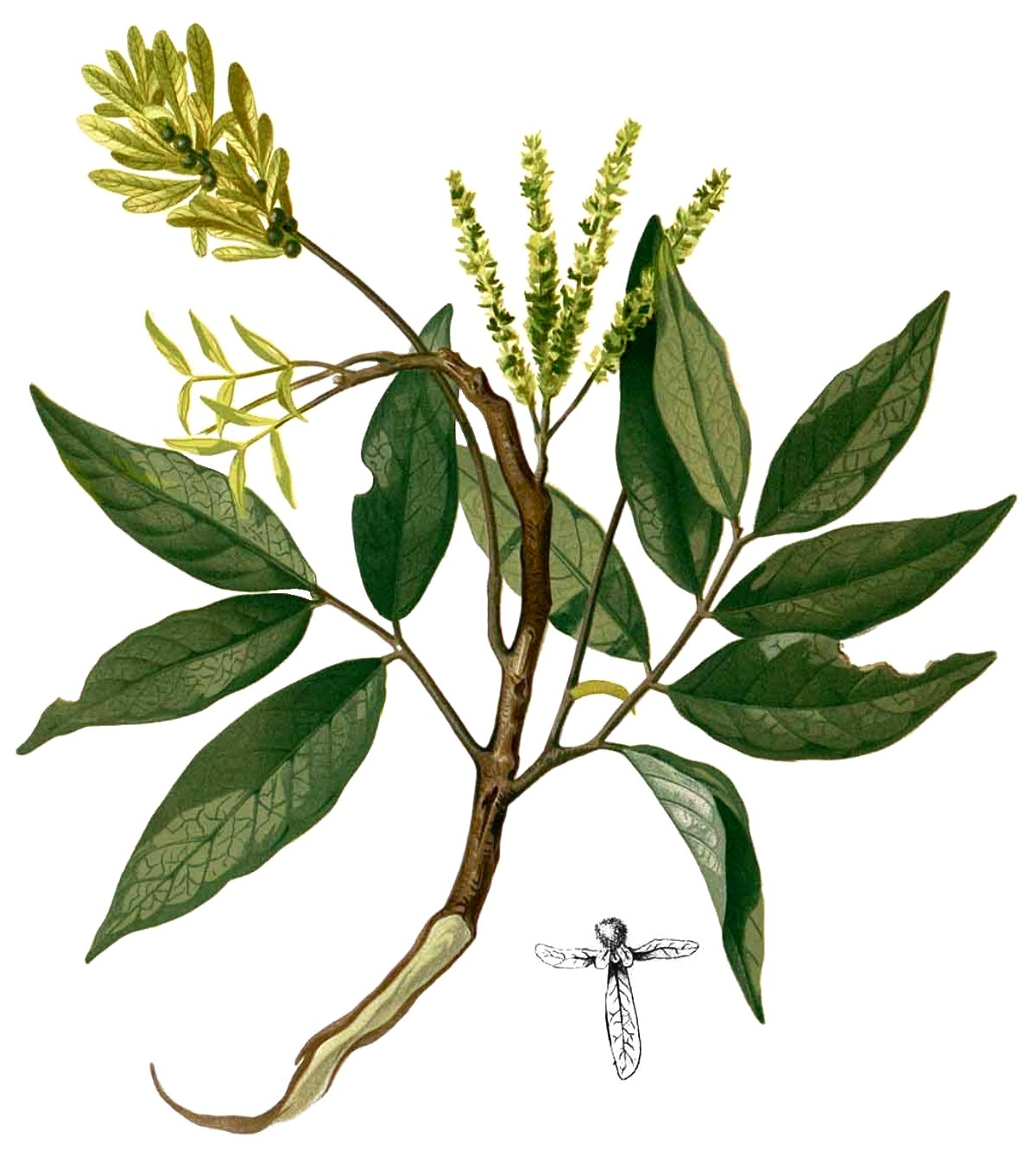

Conservation status
- Least Concern (IUCN 3.1)

Scientific classification
- Kingdom: Plantae
- Clade: Embryophytes
- Clade: Tracheophytes
- Clade: Angiosperms
- Clade: Eudicots
- Clade: Rosids
- Order: Fagales
- Family: Juglandaceae
- Genus: Engelhardia
- Species: E. spicata

Binomial name
- Engelhardia spicata Lesch. ex Blume

Varieties
- Engelhardia spicata var. integra (Kurz) W.E.Manning ex Steenis; Engelhardia spicata var. spicata

Synonyms
- Engelhardia pterococca var. spicata (Lechen ex Blume) Kuntze, nom. superfl.; Engelhardia spicata var. genuina Koord. & Valeton

= Engelhardia spicata =

Species of tree

Engelhardia spicata is a species of flowering plant in the Juglandaceae family. It is a tree native to the Indian subcontinent, Indochina, southern China, Peninsular Malaysia, Borneo, Sumatra, Java, the Lesser Sunda Islands, and the Philippines.

== Distribution and habitat ==
Pakistan, India, Nepal, Bhutan, China, Myanmar, Thailand, Laos, Vietnam, Malaysia, Indonesia, Philippines, New Guinea. From near sea level to 2100 m, in forests on mountain slopes and in valleys.

In Java it is found in primary evergreen forests and seems to prefer the mountains up to 2500 m, especially frequent in the Casuarina forests on the volcanoes in Central and East Java. It is known to locally form pure stands on the western side of Mount Jang in East Java. Similar local dominance has been observed on Mount Rindjani in Lombok, it has also been observed pioneering in mountain savannas composed of Pittosporum, Homalanthus giganteus, Vernonia arborea, Dodonaea and Wendlandia, It is often deciduous for a short time and then flowering, not in definite periods.

== Varieties ==
Two varieties are accepted.

- Engelhardia spicata var. integra (Kurz) W.E.Manning ex Steenis
- Engelhardia spicata var. spicata

== Fossil record ==
Pollen fossils of Engelhardia spicata have been recovered from strata of Messinian stage of the Miocene epoch in Western Georgia in the Caucasus region.

== Gallery ==
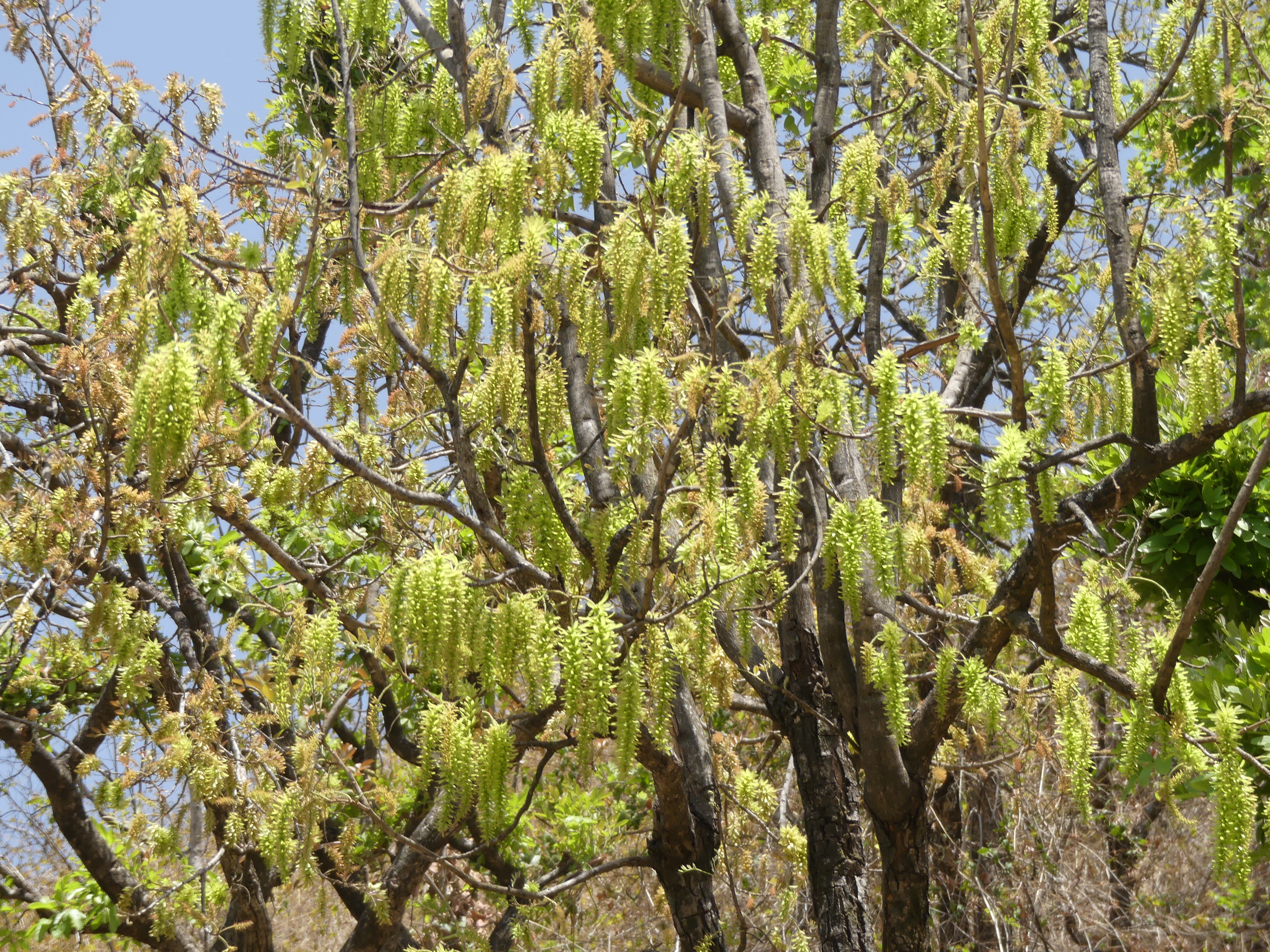
Engelhardia spicata in Ramnagar Forest, Uttarakhand, India

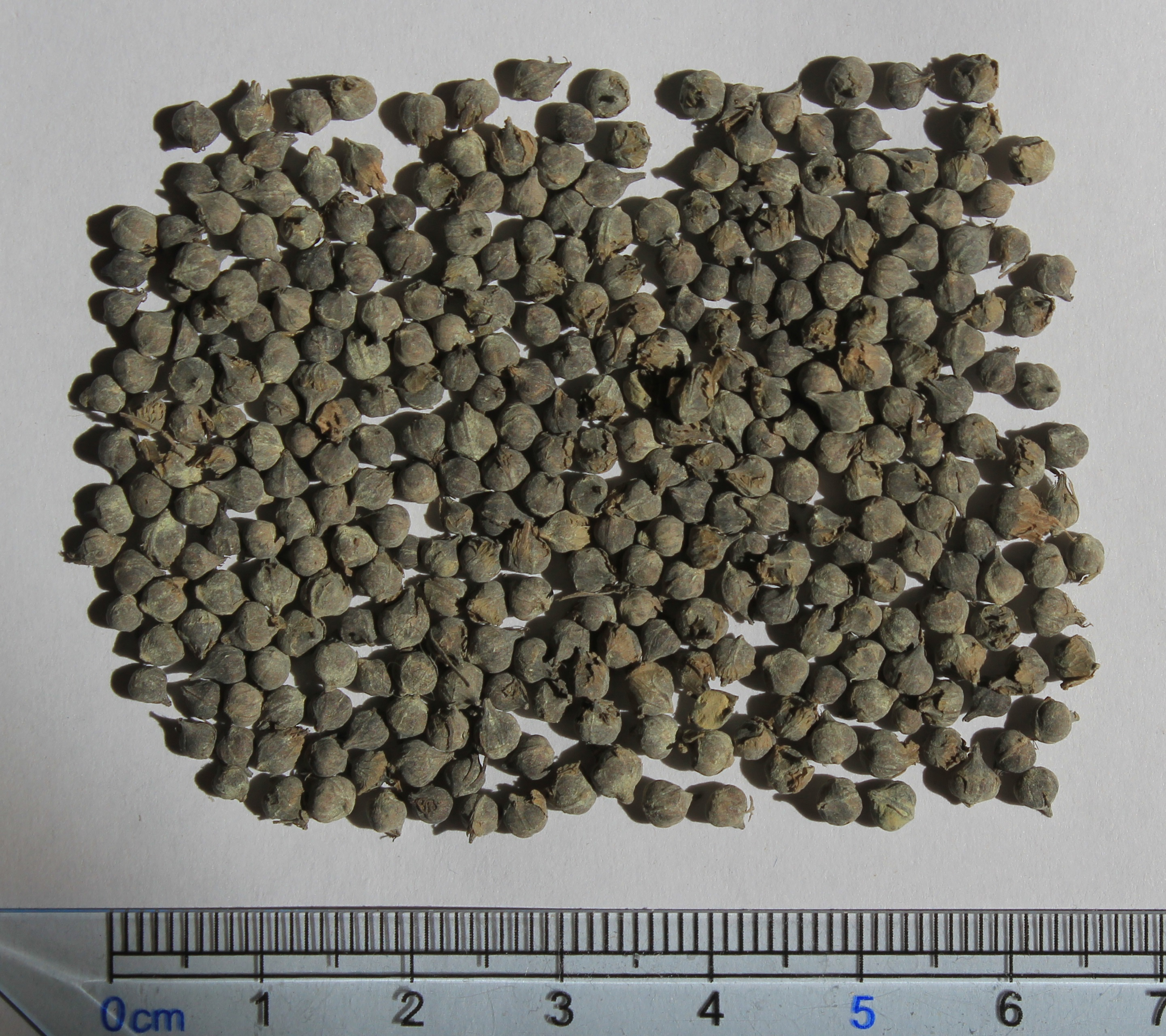
Seeds

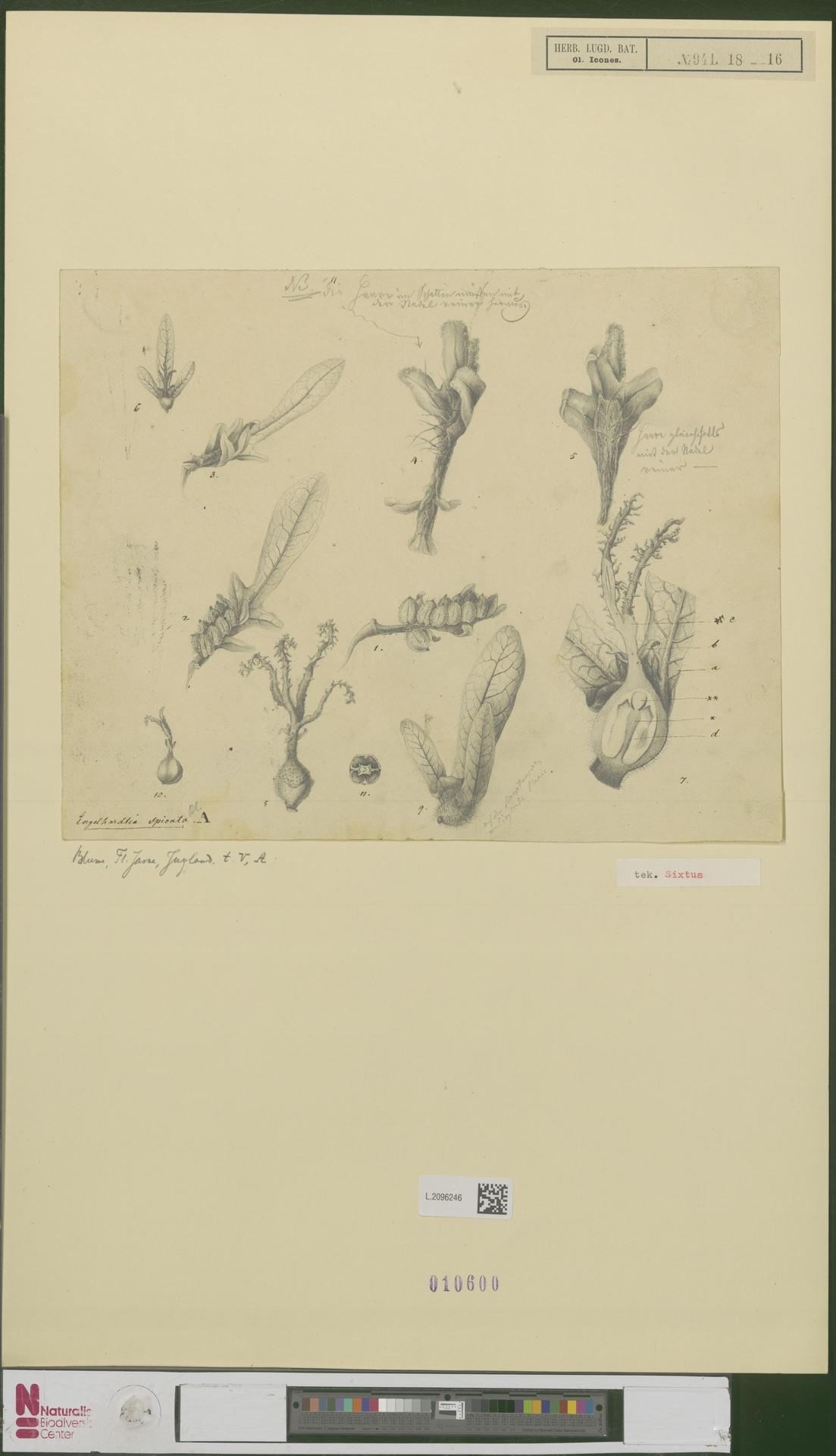
Artwork by Ernst Philipp Sixtus of Engelhardia spicata flowers
