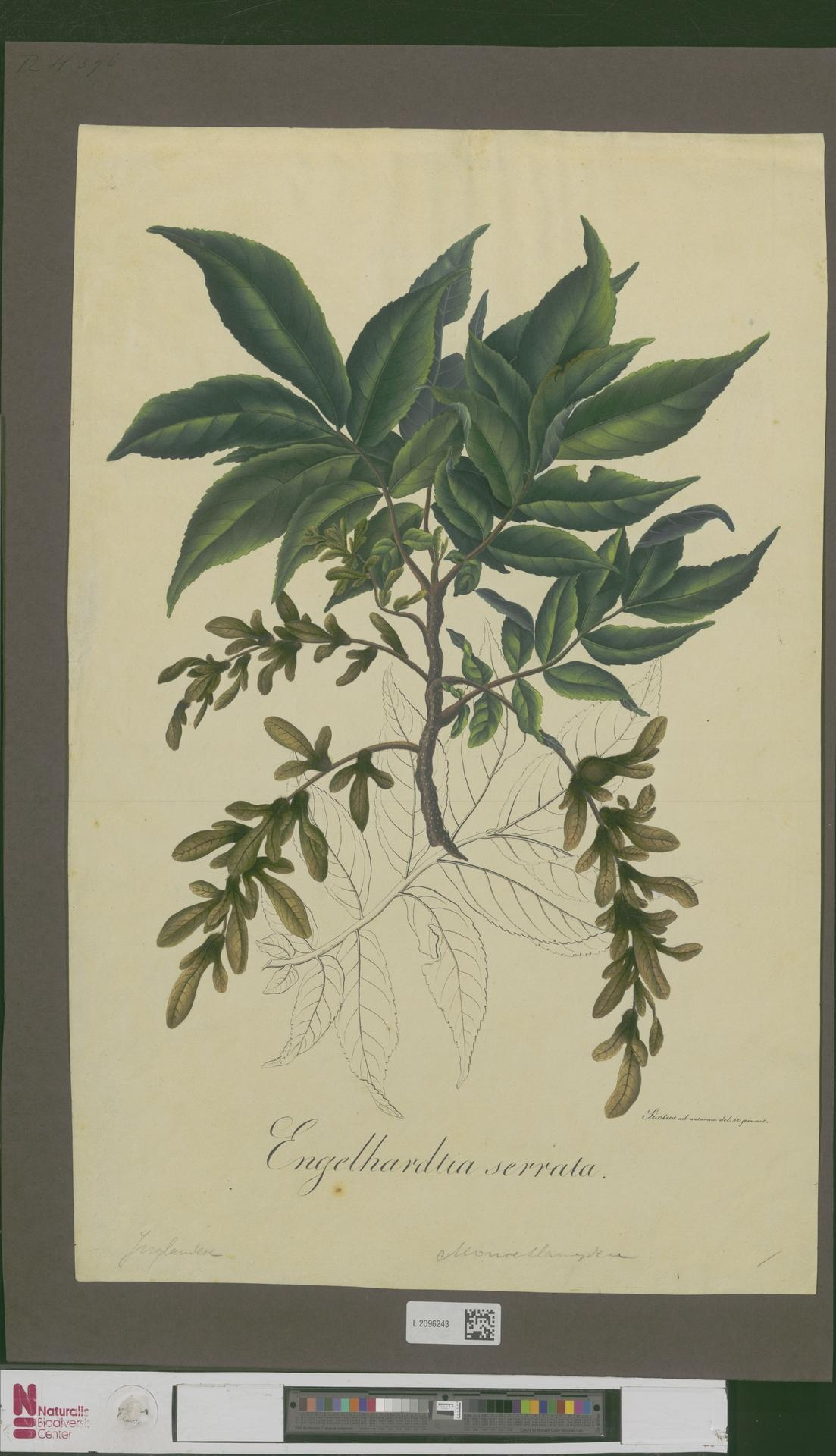

Conservation status
- Least Concern (IUCN 3.1)

Scientific classification
- Kingdom: Plantae
- Clade: Embryophytes
- Clade: Tracheophytes
- Clade: Angiosperms
- Clade: Eudicots
- Clade: Rosids
- Order: Fagales
- Family: Juglandaceae
- Genus: Engelhardia
- Species: E. serrata

Binomial name
- Engelhardia serrata Blume (1829)

Varieties
- Engelhardia serrata var. cambodiana W.E.Manning; Engelhardia serrata var. serrata

Synonyms
- synonyms of var. cambodiana: Engelhardia villosa Kurz; synonyms of var. serrata: Engelhardia nudiflora Hook.f.; Engelhardia nudiflora var. crenata Hook.f. ex Gamble; Engelhardia palembanica Miq.; Engelhardia parvifolia C.DC.; Engelhardia permicrophylla Elmer; Engelhardia serrata f. crenata (Hook.f. ex Gamble) W.E.Manning; Engelhardia serrata var. nudiflora (Hook.f.) W.E.Manning; Engelhardia serrata var. parvifolia (C.DC.) W.E.Manning

= Engelhardia serrata =

Species of tree

Engelhardia serrata is a species of tree in the family Juglandaceae. It is native to Indo-China, Peninsular Malaysia, Borneo, Java, Sumatra, Sulawesi, the Philippines, and southwestern Yunnan Province in south-central China.

== Varieties ==
The following are recognised:

- Engelhardia serrata var. serrata: from Indonesia and the Philippines
- Engelhardia serrata var. cambodica (Kurz) W.E. Manning: China (SW-Yunnan), Cambodia, India, Laos, Myanmar [Burma], Thailand and Vietnam

== Description ==
Engelhardia serrata is a tree growing up to 12 m tall. The leaves are pinnate, rarely unpaired, and 150–250 mm long. The petiole is 10–20 mm long and hairy; the rachis is also hairy. The 6 to 14 leaflets are seated or short stalked, the blade is elliptic to elliptic-lanceolate, 60–130 mm long and 25–45 mm wide, the underside is hairy. The leaf margin is irregularly or completely serrated, the end is pointed or briefly pointed.

The fruits are spherical nuts, about 3 mm in size and rough-haired, typically maturing is in April. The wings are rough-haired at the base, the middle wing is 20–25 mm long, others about 13 mm.
