= Flavanone 3-dioxygenase =

Class of enzymes

Naringenin 3-dioxygenase

Identifiers
- EC no.: 1.14.11.9
- CAS no.: 75991-43-4

Databases
- IntEnz: IntEnz view
- BRENDA: BRENDA entry
- ExPASy: NiceZyme view
- KEGG: KEGG entry
- MetaCyc: metabolic pathway
- PRIAM: profile
- PDB structures: RCSB PDB PDBe PDBsum
- Gene Ontology: AmiGO / QuickGO
Search
- PMC: articles
- PubMed: articles
- NCBI: proteins

Flavanone 3-dioxygenase (EC 1.14.11.9) is an enzyme that catalyzes several chemical reactions of flavanones. For example, naringenin is converted to aromadendrin:

naringenin
Fe(IV)=O
Fe(II)
aromadendrin

The enzyme is a member of a superfamily of alpha-ketoglutarate-dependent hydroxylases. Its substrates are a flavanone such as naringenin and oxygen. These are converted into a flavanonol.

This enzyme is an oxidase, with systematic name flavanone,2-oxoglutarate:oxygen oxidoreductase (3-hydroxylating). Other names in common use include naringenin 3-hydroxylase, flavanone 3-hydroxylase, flavanone 3beta-hydroxylase, flavanone synthase I, (2S)-flavanone 3-hydroxylase, and naringenin,2-oxoglutarate:oxygen oxidoreductase (3-hydroxylating). It is a non-heme iron protein with ferryl active site where Fe(IV)=O is the species that transfers its oxygen to the substrate.

The mechanism of action requires 2-oxoglutaric acid to activate the iron oxygen complex, and this gives succinic acid and carbon dioxide when the second atom of the molecular oxygen is removed. Ascorbic acid improves the turnover number of the enzyme.

2-oxoglutaric acid
[O]
CO_{2}
succinic acid
