= Engelhardia mendalomensis =

Conservation status
- Vulnerable (IUCN 2.3)

Scientific classification
- Kingdom: Plantae
- Clade: Embryophytes
- Clade: Tracheophytes
- Clade: Angiosperms
- Clade: Eudicots
- Clade: Rosids
- Order: Fagales
- Family: Juglandaceae
- Genus: Engelhardia
- Species: E. mendalomensis

Binomial name
- Engelhardia mendalomensis E.J.F.Campb.

Species of tree

Engelhardia mendalomensis is a tree in the family Juglandaceae. It is named for the Mendalom Forest Reserve in Borneo.

== Description ==
Engelhardia mendalomensis grows up to 35 m (110 ft) tall, with a trunk diameter of up to 80 cm (30 in). It has buttresses up to 3 m (10 ft) high and extending out to 4 m (13 ft). The bark is grey to brown. The leaves are falcate or lanceolate or ovate and measure up to 11 cm (4 in) long.

== Distribution and habitat ==
Engelhardia mendalomensis is native to Borneo (Sabah) and Papua New Guinea. Its habitat is mixed dipterocarp forests, to elevations of 550 m (1,800 ft).
