= Xeractinol =

Names
- IUPAC name (2R,3R)-6-(β-D-Glucopyranosyl)-3,3′,5,5′,7-pentahydroxyflavan-4-one
- Systematic IUPAC name (2R,3R)-2-(3,5-Dihydroxyphenyl)-3,5,7-trihydroxy-6-[(2S,3R,4R,5S,6R)-3,4,5-trihydroxy-6-(hydroxymethyl)oxan-2-yl]-4H-1-benzopyran-4-one

Identifiers
| 3D model (JSmol) | Interactive image |
| ChemSpider | 58838615 |
| PubChem CID | 165360123 |
| CompTox Dashboard (EPA) | DTXSID901336188 |
- InChI: InChI=1S/C21H22O12/c22-5-11-14(26)17(29)19(31)21(33-11)12-9(25)4-10-13(15(12)27)16(28)18(30)20(32-10)6-1-7(23)3-8(24)2-6/h1-4,11,14,17-27,29-31H,5H2/t11-,14-,17+,18+,19-,20-,21+/m1/s1 Key: DBEVFDSIUAOFPU-FWCPWLSYSA-N
- SMILES: c1c(cc(cc1O)O)[C@@H]2[C@H](C(=O)c3c(cc(c(c3O)[C@H]4[C@@H]([C@H]([C@@H]([C@H](O4)CO)O)O)O)O)O2)O

Properties
| Chemical formula | C_{21}H_{22}O_{12} |
| Molar mass | 466.39 g/mol |
- Except where otherwise noted, data are given for materials in their standard state (at 25 °C [77 °F], 100 kPa). verify (what is ?) Infobox references

Xeractinol is a flavanonol, a type of flavonoid. It is a glucoside that can be found in the leaves of Paepalanthus argenteus (Eriocaulaceae).
