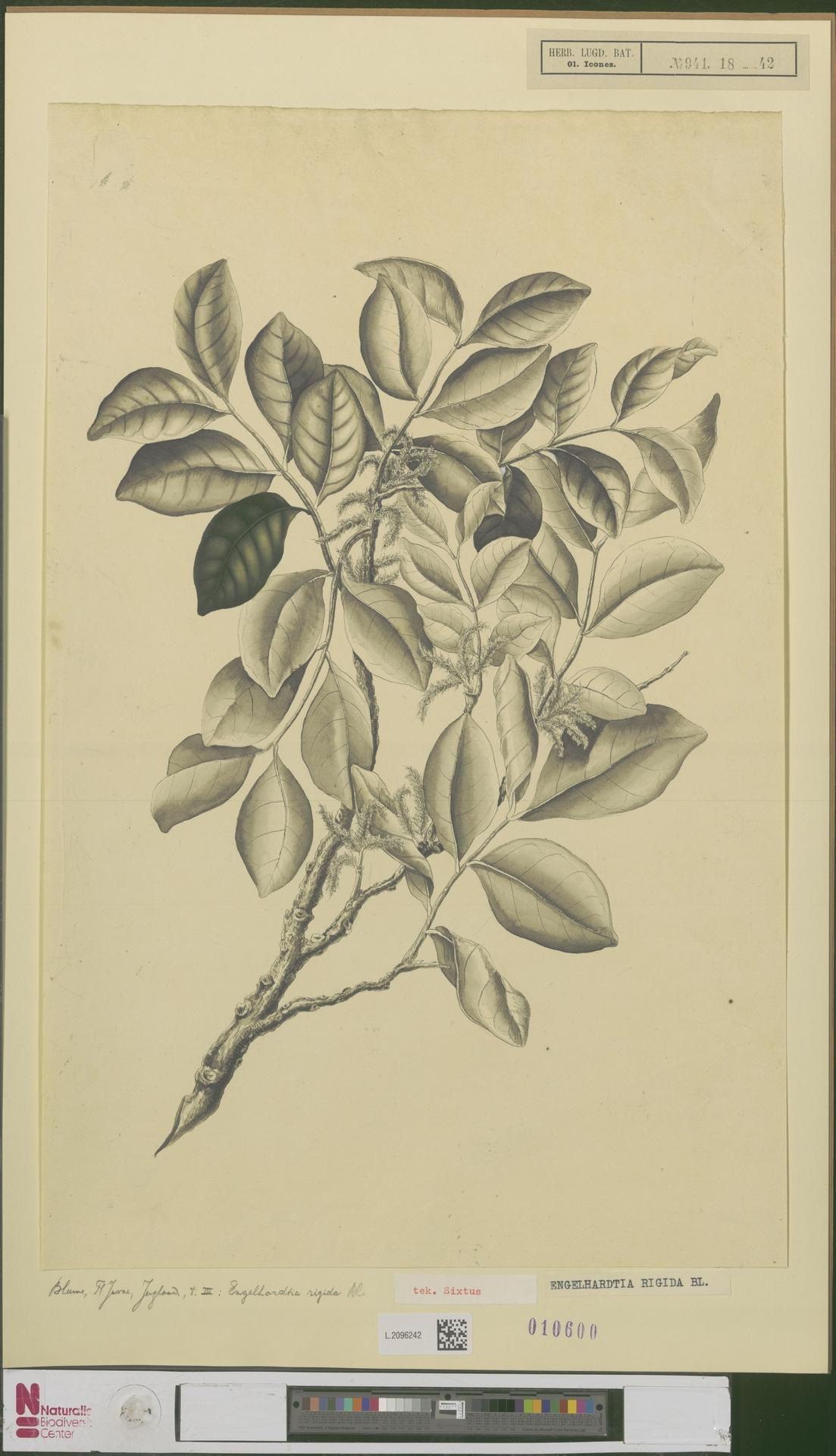
- Botanical drawing by Ernst Philipp Sixtus

Conservation status
- Least Concern (IUCN 3.1)

Scientific classification
- Kingdom: Plantae
- Clade: Embryophytes
- Clade: Tracheophytes
- Clade: Angiosperms
- Clade: Eudicots
- Clade: Rosids
- Order: Fagales
- Family: Juglandaceae
- Genus: Engelhardia
- Species: E. rigida

Binomial name
- Engelhardia rigida Blume

Synonyms
- Engelhardia lepidota Schltr.; Engelhardia subsimplicifolia Merr.; Engelhardia zambalensis Elmer

= Engelhardia rigida =

Species of tree

Engelhardia rigida is a tree in the family Juglandaceae. It is native to maritime Southeast Asia.

== Description ==
Engelhardia rigida grows up to 50 m (160 ft) tall, with a trunk diameter of up to 90 cm (40 in). It has buttresses up to 3 m (10 ft) high and extending out to 2 m (7 ft). The bark is reddish to grey. The papery leaves are elliptic to ovate and measure up to 7.1 cm (2.8 in) long, occasionally to 16.5 cm (6.5 in) long. The fruits are winged. The tree is sometimes harvested for its timber in Papua New Guinea.

== Taxonomy ==
Engelhardia rigida was described by German-Dutch botanist Carl Ludwig Blume in 1826. The type specimen was collected in Java. The specific epithet rigida means 'stiff', referring to the leaves.

== Distribution and habitat ==
Engelhardia rigida is native to Java, Borneo, Sulawesi, the Maluku Islands, the Philippines and New Guinea. Its habitat is mixed dipterocarp forests, to elevations of 2,500 m (8,000 ft). It is threatened by conversion of its habitat for urban development and agriculture.
