= Engelhardia apoensis =

Scientific classification
- Kingdom: Plantae
- Clade: Tracheophytes
- Clade: Angiosperms
- Clade: Eudicots
- Clade: Rosids
- Order: Fagales
- Family: Juglandaceae
- Genus: Engelhardia
- Species: E. apoensis

Binomial name
- Engelhardia apoensis Elmer ex Nagel

Species of tree

Engelhardia apoensis is a tree in the family Juglandaceae. It is named for Mount Apo in the Philippines.

== Description ==
Engelhardia apoensis grows up to 50 m (160 ft) tall, with a trunk diameter of up to 150 cm (60 in). It has buttresses up to 4 m (13 ft) high and extending out to 1.5 m (5 ft). The bark is reddish to grey. The papery leaves are lanceolate to ovate and measure up to 13 cm (5 in) long. The inflorescences feature catkins. The fruits are winged.

== Distribution and habitat ==
Engelhardia apoensis is native to Peninsular Malaysia, Borneo and the Philippines. Its habitat is mixed dipterocarp forests, at elevations of 700–1,300 m (2,000–4,000 ft).
