= Engelhardia mersingensis =

Scientific classification
- Kingdom: Plantae
- Clade: Tracheophytes
- Clade: Angiosperms
- Clade: Eudicots
- Clade: Rosids
- Order: Fagales
- Family: Juglandaceae
- Genus: Engelhardia
- Species: E. mersingensis

Binomial name
- Engelhardia mersingensis E.J.F.Campb.

Species of tree

Engelhardia mersingensis is a tree in the family Juglandaceae. It is named for Mount Mersing in Borneo.

== Description ==
Engelhardia mersingensis grows up to 30 m (100 ft) tall, with a trunk diameter of up to 70 cm (28 in). It has tall buttresses. The bark is brown to orange. The papery leaves are obovate to elliptic and measure up to 11 cm (4.3 in) long. The fruits are winged.

== Distribution and habitat ==
Engelhardia mersingensis is endemic to Borneo. Its habitat is mixed dipterocarp to submontane forests, at elevations of 600–1,000 m (2,000–3,300 ft).
