= Phellamurin =

Names
- IUPAC name (2R,3R)-7-(β-D-Glucopyranosyloxy)-3,4′,5-trihydroxy-8-(3-methylbut-2-en-1-yl)flavan-4-one
- Systematic IUPAC name (2R,3R)-3,5-Dihydroxy-2-(4-hydroxyphenyl)-8-(3-methylbut-2-en-1-yl)-7-{[(2S,3R,4S,5S,6R)-3,4,5-trihydroxy-6-(hydroxymethyl)oxan-2-yl]oxy}-2,3-dihydro-4H-1-benzopyran-4-one
- Other names Fellavine; 8-Prenyldihydrokaempferol 7-glucoside Epimedoside C

Identifiers
CAS Number	52589-11-4
3D model (JSmol)	Interactive image
ChEBI	CHEBI:8048
ChemSpider	168247
KEGG	C09808
MeSH	C016043
PubChem CID	193876
UNII	UXB86HY2NK
CompTox Dashboard (EPA)	DTXSID00200563
- InChI: InChI=1S/C26H30O11/c1-11(2)3-8-14-16(35-26-23(34)21(32)19(30)17(10-27)36-26)9-15(29)18-20(31)22(33)24(37-25(14)18)12-4-6-13(28)7-5-12/h3-7,9,17,19,21-24,26-30,32-34H,8,10H2,1-2H3/t17-,19-,21+,22+,23-,24-,26-/m1/s1 Key: GRDZTDZJQRPNCN-YIANMRPHSA-N; InChI=1/C26H30O11/c1-11(2)3-8-14-16(35-26-23(34)21(32)19(30)17(10-27)36-26)9-15(29)18-20(31)22(33)24(37-25(14)18)12-4-6-13(28)7-5-12/h3-7,9,17,19,21-24,26-30,32-34H,8,10H2,1-2H3/t17-,19-,21+,22+,23-,24-,26-/m1/s1 Key: GRDZTDZJQRPNCN-YIANMRPHBT
- SMILES: CC(=CCC1=C(C=C(C2=C1O[C@@H]([C@H](C2=O)O)C3=CC=C(C=C3)O)O)O[C@H]4[C@@H]([C@H]([C@@H]([C@H](O4)CO)O)O)O)C

Properties
Chemical formula	C_{26}H_{30}O_{11}
Molar mass	518.515 g·mol^{−1}
- Except where otherwise noted, data are given for materials in their standard state (at 25 °C [77 °F], 100 kPa). verify (what is ?) Infobox references

Phellamurin, a flavonoid, is the 7-O-β-D-glucopyranoside, 8-C-prenyl derivative of the flavan-on-ol Aromadendrin, and may be seen as the 7-O-glucoside of noricaritin. Being a flavanonol, it has two stereocenters on the C-ring, so four stereoisomers of phellamurin are possible.

It can be found in Commiphora africana and in Phellodendron amurense.

== Related compounds ==
6"′-O-acetyl phellamurin is found in the leaves of Phellodendron japonicum.
