= Flavonol synthase =

flavonol synthase

Identifiers
- EC no.: 1.14.20.6
- CAS no.: 146359-76-4

Databases
- IntEnz: IntEnz view
- BRENDA: BRENDA entry
- ExPASy: NiceZyme view
- KEGG: KEGG entry
- MetaCyc: metabolic pathway
- PRIAM: profile
- PDB structures: RCSB PDB PDBe PDBsum
- Gene Ontology: AmiGO / QuickGO
Search
- PMC: articles
- PubMed: articles
- NCBI: proteins

In enzymology, a flavonol synthase (EC 1.14.20.6) is an enzyme that catalyzes the following chemical reaction :

dihydroflavonol + 2-oxoglutarate + O_{2} $\rightleftharpoons$ a flavonol + succinate + CO_{2} + H_{2}O

The 3 substrates of this enzyme are dihydroflavonol, 2-oxoglutarate, and O_{2}, whereas its 4 products are flavonol, succinate, CO_{2}, and H_{2}O.

This enzyme belongs to the family of oxidoreductases, specifically those acting on paired donors, with O_{2} as oxidant and incorporation or reduction of oxygen. The oxygen incorporated need not be derived from O_{2} with 2-oxoglutarate as one donor, and incorporation of one atom of oxygen into each donor. The systematic name of this enzyme class is dihydroflavonol,2-oxoglutarate:oxygen oxidoreductase. This enzyme participates in flavonoid biosynthesis.
