= Hymenaea martiana =

Scientific classification
- Kingdom: Plantae
- Clade: Tracheophytes
- Clade: Angiosperms
- Clade: Eudicots
- Clade: Rosids
- Order: Fabales
- Family: Fabaceae
- Genus: Hymenaea
- Species: H. martiana

Binomial name
- Hymenaea martiana Hayne

Synonyms
- Hymenaea sellowiana Hayne

Species of legume

Hymenaea martiana is a tree species in the genus Hymenaea found in Brazil (Alagoas, Bahia, Ceara, Goias, Mato Grosso, Minas Gerais, Pernambuco) and Paraguay.

== Chemicals ==
The three rhamnosides eucryphin, astilbin and engelitin can be isolated from the bark of H. martiana.
