= Engelhardia hainanensis =

Scientific classification
- Kingdom: Plantae
- Clade: Embryophytes
- Clade: Tracheophytes
- Clade: Spermatophytes
- Clade: Angiosperms
- Clade: Eudicots
- Clade: Rosids
- Order: Fagales
- Family: Juglandaceae
- Genus: Engelhardia
- Species: E. hainanensis

Binomial name
- Engelhardia hainanensis Chen

Species of tree

Engelhardia hainanensis is a tree native to Hainan Province, China.
