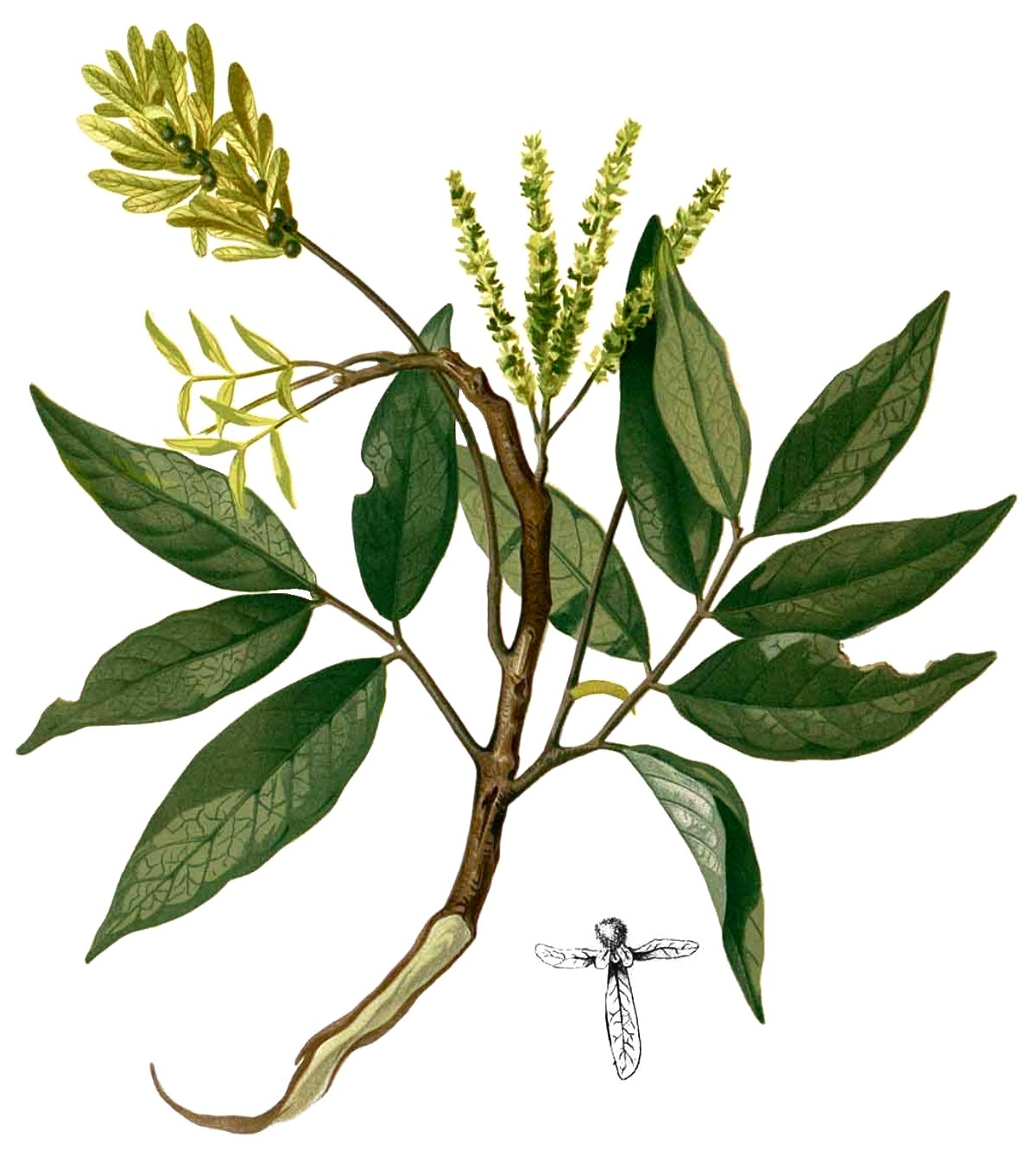
- Engelhardia spicata

Scientific classification
- Kingdom: Plantae
- Clade: Embryophytes
- Clade: Tracheophytes
- Clade: Angiosperms
- Clade: Eudicots
- Clade: Rosids
- Order: Fagales
- Family: Juglandaceae
- Subfamily: Engelhardioideae
- Genus: Engelhardia; Lesch. ex Blume

Synonyms
- Alfaropsis Iljinsk.; Pterilema Reinw.

= Engelhardia =

Genus of flowering plants

Engelhardia is a genus of trees in the family Juglandaceae, native to tropical Asia from northern India east to Taiwan, Indonesia and the Philippines. The genus name is commonly misspelled "Engelhardtia", a "correction" made by the original author Carl Ludwig Blume in 1829 and persistent until today, as it was thus entered in the Index Kewensis; the original spelling is Engelhardia.

== Fossil record ==
Engelhardia pollen has been found in deposits of Miocene Age in Denmark. †Engelhardia orsbergensis leaf fossils have been uncovered from rhyodacite tuff of Lower Miocene age in Southern Slovakia near the town of Lučenec. †Engelhardia orsbergensis and †Engelhardia macroptera fossils have been uncovered from late Miocene strata in Iceland.

== Species ==
As of August 2026, Plants of the World Online recognised the following species and varieties:

- Engelhardia anminiana H.H.Meng
- Engelhardia apoensis Elmer ex Nagel, native to Malaya, Borneo, the Philippines
- Engelhardia borneensis H.H.Meng
- Engelhardia danumensis E.J.F.Campb.
- Engelhardia hainanensis P.Y.Chen, native to China
- Engelhardia kinabaluensis E.J.F.Campb.
- Engelhardia mendalomensis E.J.F.Campb.
- Engelhardia mersingensis E.J.F.Campb.
- Engelhardia mollis Hu
- Engelhardia rigida Blume, native to Java, Borneo, New Guinea, the Philippines
- Engelhardia roxburghiana Lindl.
- Engelhardia serrata Blume, native to southwest China, Indochina, Indonesia, and the Philippines
  - Engelhardia serrata var. cambodiana W.E.Manning
  - Engelhardia serrata var. serrata
- Engelhardia spicata Lechen ex Blume, native to Nepal, southern Asia, the Philippines, and New Guinea
  - Engelhardia spicata var. integra (Kurz) W.E.Manning ex Steenis, Fl. Males. I, 6: 953 (1972); Grierson & Long, Notes Roy. Bot. Gard. Edinburgh 40: 133. (1982), isonym; syn. var. colebrookiana (Lindl.) Koorders & Valeton
  - Engelhardia spicata var. spicata
