= Engelhardia kinabaluensis =

Conservation status
- Vulnerable (IUCN 2.3)

Scientific classification
- Kingdom: Plantae
- Clade: Embryophytes
- Clade: Tracheophytes
- Clade: Angiosperms
- Clade: Eudicots
- Clade: Rosids
- Order: Fagales
- Family: Juglandaceae
- Genus: Engelhardia
- Species: E. kinabaluensis

Binomial name
- Engelhardia kinabaluensis E.J.F.Campb.

Species of tree

Engelhardia kinabaluensis is a tree in the family Juglandaceae. It is named for Mount Kinabalu in Borneo.

== Description ==
Engelhardia kinabaluensis grows up to 24 m (80 ft) tall, with a trunk diameter of up to 35 cm (14 in). The bark is black to grey. The leaves are falcate or obovate or elliptic and measure up to 6 cm (2.4 in) long.

== Distribution and habitat ==
Engelhardia kinabaluensis is endemic to Borneo, where it is known only from near Mount Kinabalu in Sabah. Its habitat is lowland dipterocarp forests, at elevations of 200–1,500 m (700–4,900 ft).
