= Dihydrokaempferol 4-reductase =

Identifiers
- EC no.: 1.1.1.219
- CAS no.: 98668-58-7

Databases
- IntEnz: IntEnz view
- BRENDA: BRENDA entry
- ExPASy: NiceZyme view
- KEGG: KEGG entry
- MetaCyc: metabolic pathway
- PRIAM: profile
- PDB structures: RCSB PDB PDBe PDBsum
- Gene Ontology: AmiGO / QuickGO
Search
- PMC: articles
- PubMed: articles
- NCBI: proteins

Dihydrokaempferol 4-reductase (EC 1.1.1.219) is an enzyme that catalyzes the chemical reaction

aromadendrin
+ NADPH
H^{+}
leucopelargonidin
+ NADP^{+}

The three substrates of this enzyme are aromadendrin ((+)-dihydrokaempferol), reduced nicotinamide adenine dinucleotide phosphate (NADPH), and a proton. Its products are leucopelargonidin and oxidised NADP^{+}.

This enzyme is an oxidoreductase with the systematic name cis-3,4-leucopelargonidin:NADP^{+} 4-oxidoreductase. Other names in common use include dihydroflavanol 4-reductase (DFR), dihydromyricetin reductase, NADPH-dihydromyricetin reductase, and dihydroquercetin reductase. It participates in flavonoid biosynthesis.

== Function ==
Dihydrokaempferol 4-reductase is part of the biosynthetic pathway to anthocyanidins and anthocyanins, which are common plant pigments.

In addition to converting aromadendrin to leucopelargonidin, it converts ampelopsin ((+)-dihydromyricetin) to leucodelphinidin.

ampelopsin
+ NADPH
H^{+}
leucodelphinidin
+ NADP^{+}

A cDNA for this reductase has been cloned from the orchid Bromheadia finlaysoniana.

Researchers in Japan have genetically manipulated roses by using RNA interference to knock out the endogenous enzyme and add a gene for an alternative reductase found in an iris; or add a gene for the blue pigment, delphinidin, to create a blue rose, which is being sold worldwide.

Dihydrokaempferol 4-reductase is also an enzyme on the lignin biosynthesis pathway. In Arabidopsis thaliana, the enzyme uses sinapaldehyde or coniferyl aldehyde or coumaraldehyde to produce sinapyl alcohol or coniferyl alcohol or coumaryl alcohol respectively.

== Structural studies ==
As of late 2007, two structures have been solved for this class of enzymes, with PDB accession codes 2C29 and 2IOD.
