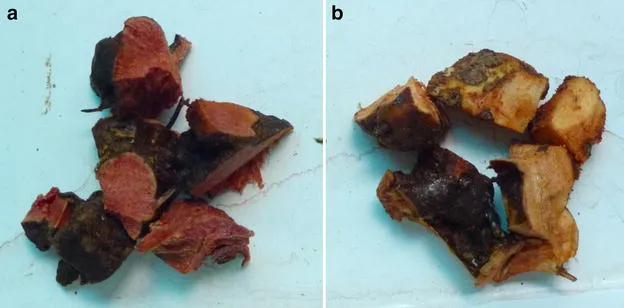

Scientific classification
- Kingdom: Plantae
- Clade: Tracheophytes
- Clade: Angiosperms
- Clade: Monocots
- Order: Liliales
- Family: Smilacaceae
- Genus: Smilax
- Species: S. glabra

Binomial name
- Smilax glabra Roxb.

Synonyms
- Smilax lanceolata Burm.f 1768 not L. 1753; Smilax hookeri Kunth; Smilax trigona Warb.; Smilax dunniana H.Lév.; Smilax blinii H.Lév.; Smilax mengmaensis R.H.Miao

= Smilax glabra =

Species of flowering plant

Smilax glabra, sarsaparilla, is a plant species in the genus Smilax. It is native to China, the Himalayas, and Indochina.

S. glabra is a traditional medicine in Chinese herbology, whence it is also known as tufuling (土茯苓) or chinaroot, china-root, and china root (a name it shares with the related S. china). Chinaroot is a key ingredient in the Chinese medical dessert guilinggao, which uses its ability to set certain kinds of jelly.

== Chemical composition ==
Dihydro-flavonol glycosides (astilbin, neoastilbin, isoastilbin, neoisoastilbin, (2R, 3R)-taxifolin-3'-O-beta-D-pyranoglucoside) have been identified in the rhizome of Smilax glabra as well as smitilbin, a flavanonol rhamnoside. Smiglabrone A and Smiglabrone B are phenylpropanoid-substituted epicatechins that have also been isolated from the root.

Sarsasapogenin, a steroidal sapogenin, can also be found in S. glabra.

== Use in traditional Chinese medicine ==
The root of S. glabra is used in traditional Chinese medicine (TCM) to treat dysentery, joint pain and colds. S. glabra is grown in Southern China. The rhizome of the plant is collected and dried during all seasons for herbal use. The dried root is mixed with water and taken orally. It is believed to cure Syphilis and restore balance in the body in response to yin disease by removing dampness and toxicity.
