= Smitilbin =

Names
- IUPAC name (2R,3S)-2-(3,5-dihydroxyphenyl)-5,7-dihydroxy-3-[(2S,3R,4R,6S)-3,4,5-trihydroxy-6-methyloxan-2-yl]oxy-2,3-dihydrochromen-4-one
- Other names Isoastilbin B

Identifiers
CAS Number	222846-33-5
3D model (JSmol)	Interactive image
ChemSpider	58539792
PubChem CID	9889962
CompTox Dashboard (EPA)	DTXSID80720698
- InChI: InChI=1S/C23H26O9/c1-9-4-10(2)16-15(5-9)31-21(12-6-13(24)8-14(25)7-12)22(18(16)27)32-23-20(29)19(28)17(26)11(3)30-23/h4-8,11,17,19-26,28-29H,1-3H3/t11-,17-,19+,20+,21+,22+,23-/m0/s1 Key: XIFOLBFVNYGHBL-SZGUTPPVSA-N
- SMILES: Cc1cc(c2c(c1)O[C@@H]([C@@H](C2=O)O[C@H]3[C@@H]([C@@H]([C@H]([C@@H](O3)C)O)O)O)c4cc(cc(c4)O)O)C

Properties
Chemical formula	C_{21}H_{22}O_{11}
Molar mass	450.39 g/mol
- Except where otherwise noted, data are given for materials in their standard state (at 25 °C [77 °F], 100 kPa). verify (what is ?) Infobox references

Smitilbin is a flavanonol, a type of flavonoid. It is a rhamnoside that can be isolated in Smilax glabra (Chinaroot, sarsaparilla).

== Uses ==
Smitilbin could be used for preventing immunological hepatocyte damage.

== Related compounds ==
Neosmitilbin

Neosmitilbin is a stereoisomer of smitilbin.
