= Astilbin =

Names
- IUPAC name (2R,3R)-3′,4′,5,7-Tetrahydroxy-3-(α-L-rhamnopyranosyloxy)flavan-4-one
- Systematic IUPAC name (2R,3R)-2-(3,4-Dihydroxyphenyl)-5,7-dihydroxy-3-{[(2S,3R,4R,5R,6S)-3,4,5-trihydroxy-6-methyloxan-2-yl]oxy}-2,3-dihydro-4H-1-benzopyran-4-one
- Other names Isoastilbin; Neoastilbin; Neoisoastilbin; Taxifolin 3-O-rhamnoside; Taxifolin 3-rhamnoside (2R-trans)-3-((6-Deoxy-alpha-L-mannopyranosyl)oxy)-2-(3,4- dihydroxyphenyl)-2,3-dihydro-5,7-dihydroxy-4H-1-benzopyran-4-one

Identifiers
CAS Number	54141-72-9
3D model (JSmol)	Interactive image
ChEBI	CHEBI:38200
ChEMBL	ChEMBL486017
ChemSpider	106533
ECHA InfoCard	100.222.924
KEGG	C17449
PubChem CID	119258
UNII	KA92CW3M68
CompTox Dashboard (EPA)	DTXSID501019948
- InChI: InChI=1S/C21H22O11/c1-7-15(26)17(28)18(29)21(30-7)32-20-16(27)14-12(25)5-9(22)6-13(14)31-19(20)8-2-3-10(23)11(24)4-8/h2-7,15,17-26,28-29H,1H3/t7-,15-,17+,18+,19+,20-,21-/m0/s1 Key: ZROGCCBNZBKLEL-MPRHSVQHSA-N; InChI=1/C21H22O11/c1-7-15(26)17(28)18(29)21(30-7)32-20-16(27)14-12(25)5-9(22)6-13(14)31-19(20)8-2-3-10(23)11(24)4-8/h2-7,15,17-26,28-29H,1H3/t7-,15-,17+,18+,19+,20-,21-/m0/s1 Key: ZROGCCBNZBKLEL-MPRHSVQHBV
- SMILES: O=C3c4c(O)cc(O)cc4O[C@H](c1ccc(O)c(O)c1)[C@H]3O[C@@H]2O[C@H]([C@H](O)[C@@H](O)[C@H]2O)C

Properties
Chemical formula	C_{21}H_{22}O_{11}
Molar mass	450.39 g/mol
Appearance	brown powder
- Except where otherwise noted, data are given for materials in their standard state (at 25 °C [77 °F], 100 kPa). verify (what is ?) Infobox references

Astilbin is a flavanonol, a type of flavonoid. Astilbin is the (2R-trans)-isomer; neoisoastilbin is the (2S-cis)-isomer and isoastilbin is the (2R-cis)-isomer.

== Natural occurrences ==
Astilbin can be found in St John's wort (Hypericum perforatum, Clusiaceae, subfamily Hypericoideae, formerly often considered a full family Hypericaceae), in Dimorphandra mollis (Fava d'anta, Fabaceae), in the leaves of Harungana madagascariensis (Hypericaceae), in the rhizome of Astilbe thunbergii, in the root of Astilbe odontophylla (Saxifragaceae), in the rhizome of Smilax glabra (Chinaroot, Smilacaceae) and in the bark of Hymenaea martiana.

In food

It can be isolated from Kohki tea processed from Engelhardtia chrysolepis (huang-qui). It is also present in certain wines.

== Uses ==
Astilbin can act as an insecticide against Anticarsia gemmatalis and Spodoptera frugiperda. It shows in vitro antibacterial activity and activity on burn wound healing. Astilbin is used in traditional Chinese medicine.

== Related compounds ==
3'-O-Methylastilbin shows an immunosuppressive activity against contact dermatitis.
