= Flavanonol =

Class of chemical compounds

Flavanonol, numbering

The flavanonols (with two "o"s a.k.a. 3-hydroxyflavanone or 2,3-dihydroflavonol) are a class of flavonoids that use the 3-hydroxy-2,3-dihydro-2-phenylchromen-4-one (IUPAC name) backbone.

Some examples include:

- Taxifolin (or Dihydroquercetin)
- Aromadedrin (or Dihydrokaempferol)
- Engeletin (or Dihydrokaempferol-3-rhamnoside)

== Metabolism ==
- Flavanone 3-dioxygenase
- Flavonol synthase
- Dihydroflavonol 4-reductase

== Glycosides ==
Glycosides (chrysandroside A and chrysandroside B) can be found in the roots of Gordonia chrysandra. Xeractinol, a dihydroflavonol C-glucoside, can be isolated from the leaves of Paepalanthus argenteus var. argenteus.

Dihydro-flavonol glycosides (astilbin, neoastilbin, isoastilbin, neoisoastilbin, (2R, 3R)-taxifolin-3'-O-β-D-pyranoglucoside) have been identified in the rhizome of Smilax glabra.
