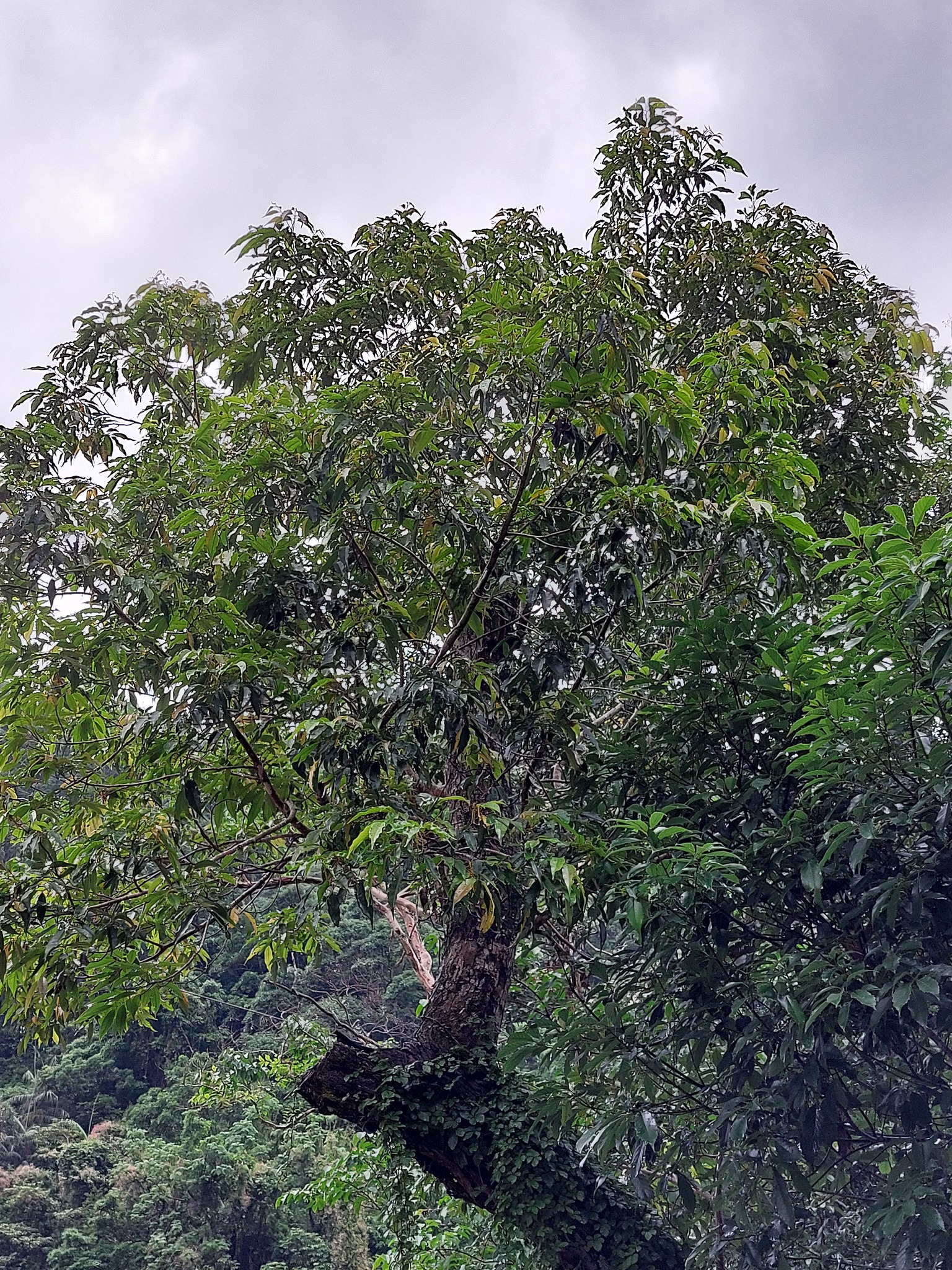
- In Taiwan

Conservation status
- Least Concern (IUCN 3.1)

Scientific classification
- Kingdom: Plantae
- Clade: Embryophytes
- Clade: Tracheophytes
- Clade: Angiosperms
- Clade: Eudicots
- Clade: Rosids
- Order: Fagales
- Family: Juglandaceae
- Genus: Engelhardia
- Species: E. roxburghiana

Binomial name
- Engelhardia roxburghiana Lindl.

Synonyms
- Synonymy: Alfaroa roxburghiana (Lindl.) Iljinsk.; Alfaropsis roxburghiana (Wall.) Iljinsk.; Engelhardia chrysolepsis Hance; Engelhardia fenzelii Merr.; Engelhardia formosana (Hayata) Hayata; Engelhardia polystachya Radlk.; Engelhardia pterococca (Roxb.) Kuntze; Engelhardia roxburghiana f. brevialata W.E.Manning; Engelhardia spicata var. formosana Hayata; Engelhardia unijuga Chun ex P.Y.Chen; Engelhardia wallichiana Lindl. ex C.DC.; Engelhardia wallichiana var. chrysolepis (Hance) C.DC.; Juglans pterococca Roxb.

= Engelhardia roxburghiana =

Species of flowering plant

Engelhardia roxburghiana is a tree in the family Juglandaceae. It is native mainly to tropical Asia.

== Description ==
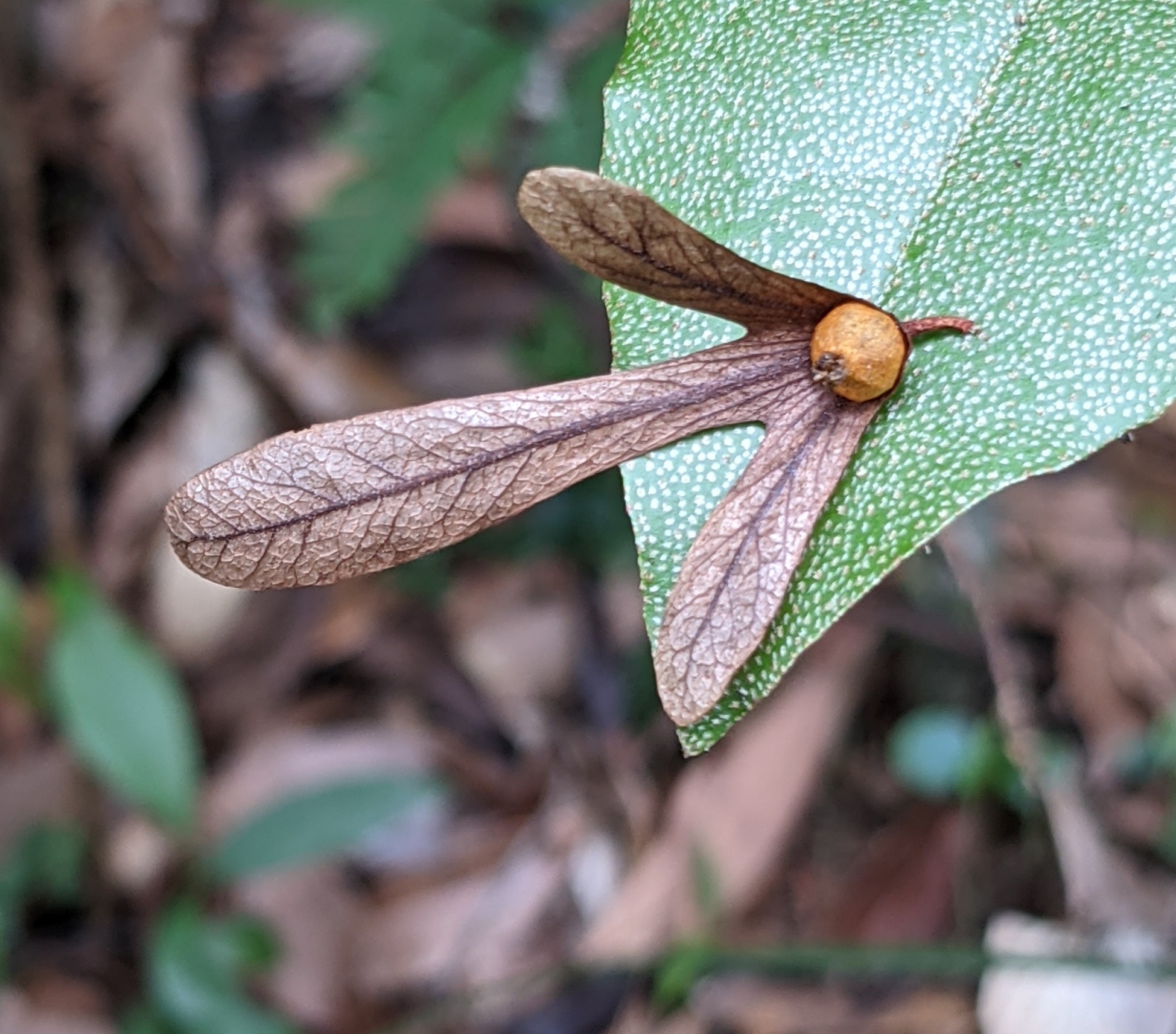
Winged fruit

Engelhardia roxburghiana grows as a tree measuring up to 35 m (110 ft) tall with a trunk diameter of up to 70 cm (30 in). The bark is fawn-coloured to dark brown to black. The inflorescences consist of eight to ten male catkins. The winged fruits measure up to 5.5 cm (2.2 in) wide.

== Taxonomy ==
Engelhardia roxburghiana was described by English botanist John Lindley in 1831. The type specimen was collected in Malaya. The species is named for the Scottish botanist William Roxburgh.

== Distribution and habitat ==
Engelhardia roxburghiana grows naturally from northeastern India and Bangladesh to Indochina, southern China, Taiwan, Sumatra, Peninsular Malaysia and Borneo. Its habitat is mixed tropical forest, including dipterocarp forest, from sea level to 1,750 m (5,700 ft) elevation. It is considered a pioneer species and is drought-resilient.

== Conservation ==
Engelhardia roxburghiana has been assessed as least concern on the IUCN Red List. It is considered abundant due to its large range.

== Uses ==
Engelhardia roxburghiana is harvested for its timber, which is suitable for furniture. Its leaves are used in Chinese traditional medicine.
