= Taxifolin =

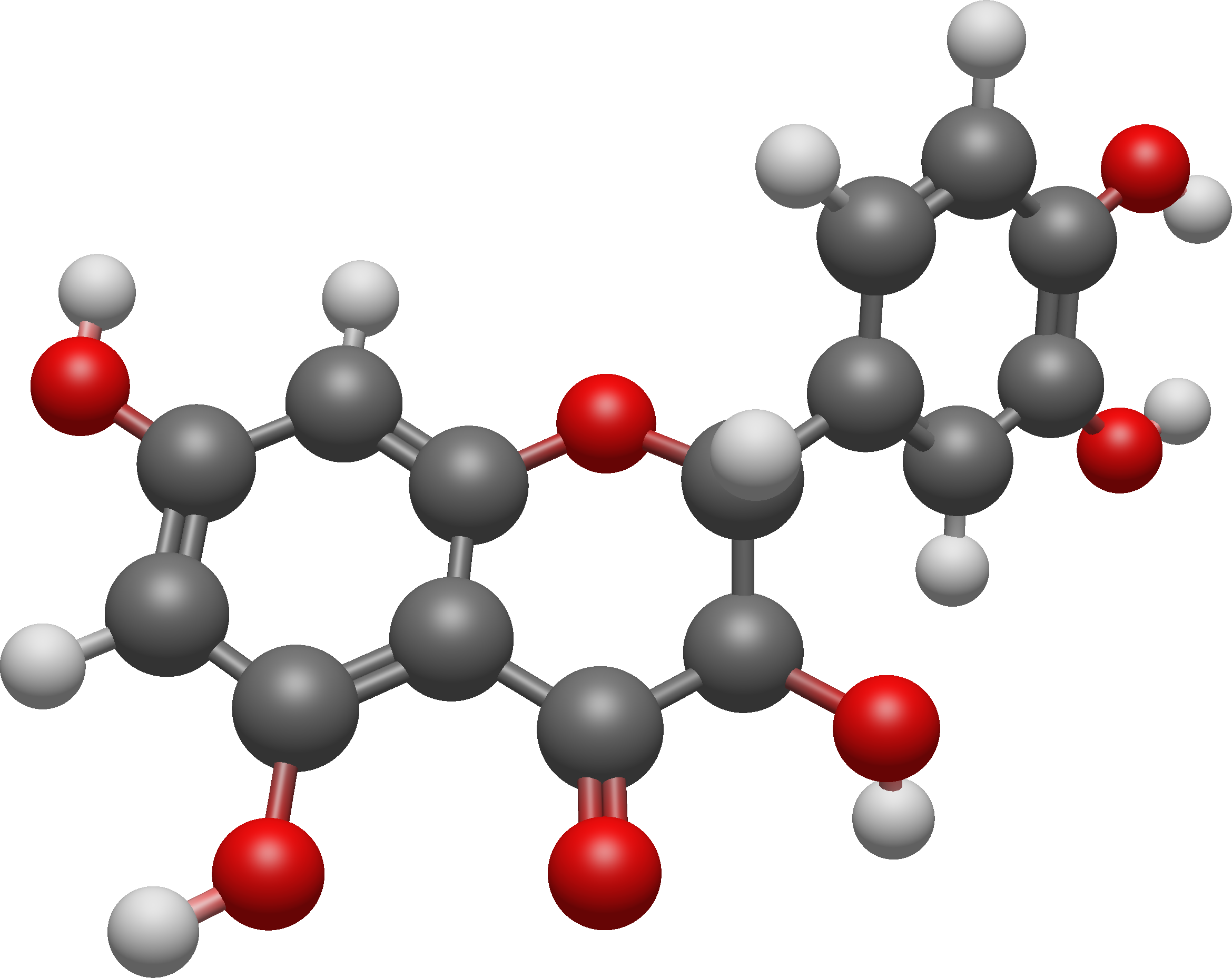

Names
- IUPAC name (2R,3R)-3,3′,4′,5,7-Pentahydroxyflavan-4-one
- Systematic IUPAC name (2R,3R)-2-(3,4-Dihydroxyphenyl)-3,5,7-trihydroxy-2,3-dihydro-4H-1-benzopyran-4-one
- Other names Dihydroquercetin; Taxifoliol; Distylin (+)-Taxifolin trans-Dihydroquercetin (+)-Dihydroquercetin

Identifiers
CAS Number	480-18-2
3D model (JSmol)	Interactive image
ChEBI	CHEBI:17948
ChEMBL	ChEMBL66
ChemSpider	388626
ECHA InfoCard	100.006.859
EC Number	207-543-4
KEGG	C01617
PubChem CID	439533
UNII	9SOB9E3987
CompTox Dashboard (EPA)	DTXSID8022450
- InChI: InChI=1S/C15H12O7/c16-7-4-10(19)12-11(5-7)22-15(14(21)13(12)20)6-1-2-8(17)9(18)3-6/h1-5,14-19,21H/t14-,15+/m0/s1 Key: CXQWRCVTCMQVQX-LSDHHAIUSA-N; InChI=1/C15H12O7/c16-7-4-10(19)12-11(5-7)22-15(14(21)13(12)20)6-1-2-8(17)9(18)3-6/h1-5,14-19,21H/t14-,15+/m0/s1 Key: CXQWRCVTCMQVQX-LSDHHAIUBE
- SMILES: OC1=C(C([C@H](O)[C@@H](C2=CC(O)=C(O)C=C2)O3)=O)C3=CC(O)=C1

Properties
Chemical formula	C_{15}H_{12}O_{7}
Molar mass	304.254 g·mol^{−1}
Appearance	Brown powder
Melting point	237 °C (459 °F; 510 K)
UV-vis (λ_{max})	290, 327 nm (methanol)
- Except where otherwise noted, data are given for materials in their standard state (at 25 °C [77 °F], 100 kPa). verify (what is ?) Infobox references

Taxifolin (5,7,3',4'-flavan-on-ol), also known as trans-dihydroquercetin （trans-DHQ), belongs to the subclass flavanonols in the flavonoids, which in turn is a class of polyphenols. It is extracted from plants such as Siberian larch and milk thistle.

(2R,3R)-DHQ is approved as a drug in Russia. It is considered a dietary supplement in the rest of the world.

== Stereocenters ==
Taxifolin has two stereocenters on the C-ring, as opposed to quercetin which has none. For example, (+)-taxifolin has (2R,3R)-configuration, making it one out of four stereoisomers that comprise two pairs of enantiomers.

trans-dihydroquercetin refers to the (2R,3R) and (2S,3S) forms, as opposed to (2R,3S)-DHQ and (2S,3R)-DHQ which are cis.

== Natural occurrences ==
Taxifolin is found in non-glutinous rice boiled with adzuki bean (adzuki-meshi).

It can be found in conifers like the Siberian larch, Larix sibirica, in Russia, in Pinus roxburghii, in Cedrus deodara and in the Chinese yew, Taxus chinensis var. mairei.

It is also found in the silymarin extract from the milk thistle seeds.

Taxifolin is present in vinegars aged in cherry wood.

Taxifolin, and flavonoids in general, can be found in many beverages and products. Specifically, taxifolin is found in plant-based foods like fruit, vegetables, wine, tea, and cocoa.

== Pharmacology ==
=== Cancer cell research ===
Taxifolin is not mutagenic and less toxic than the related compound quercetin. It acts as a potential chemopreventive agent by regulating genes via an ARE-dependent mechanism. Taxifolin has shown to inhibit the ovarian cancer cell growth in a dose-dependent manner. However, in this same study, taxifolin was the least effective flavonoid in the inhibition of VEGF expression. There is also a strong correlation (with a correlation coefficient of 0.93) between the antiproliferative effects of taxifolin derivatives on murine skin fibroblasts and human breast cancer cells.

Taxifolin has shown to have anti-proliferative effects on many types of cancer cells by inhibiting cancer cell lipogenesis. By inhibiting the fatty acid synthase in cancer cells, taxifolin is able to prevent the growth and spread of cancer cells.

Taxifolin also stops the effects of overexpression of P-glycoprotein, which prevents the development of chemoresistance. Taxifolin does this via inhibition of rhodamine 123 and doxorubicin.

=== Skin ===
The capacity of taxifolin to stimulate fibril formation and promote stabilization of fibrillar forms of collagen can be used in medicine. Also taxifolin inhibited the cellular melanogenesis as effectively as arbutin, one of the most widely used hypopigmenting agents in cosmetics.

=== Antimicrobial potential ===
Taxifolin also enhances the efficacy of conventional antibiotics such as levofloxacin and ceftazidime in vitro, which have potential for combinatory therapy of patients infected with methicillin-resistant Staphylococcus aureus (MRSA).

Like other flavonoids, taxifolin is able to function as an antifungal in vitro by blocking multiple pathways that promote the growth and proliferation of fungi.

=== Other ===
Taxifolin has also been found to reduce intestinal mobility in rodents. This effect is potentiated by verapamil and antagnoized by yohimbine.

Taxifolin has also been shown to be anti-hyperlipidemic in some animals by maintaining the normal lipid profile of the liver and keeping lipid excretion at normal levels. Taxifolin prevents hyperlipidemia by reducing the esterification of cellular cholesterol, phospholipid, and triacylglycerol synthesis.

Taxifolin shows promising pharmacological potentials in the management of inflammation, tumors, microbial infections, oxidative stress, cardiovascular, and liver disorders.

=== Molecular targets ===
Taxifolin, as well as many other flavonoids, has been found to act as a non-selective antagonist of the opioid receptors, albeit with somewhat weak affinity.

Taxifolin has been found to act as an agonist of the adiponectin receptor 2 (AdipoR2).

== Biosynthesis ==
The enzyme leucocyanidin oxygenase uses leucocyanidin, alpha-ketoglutarate, and O_{2} to produce cis-dihydroquercetin (epitaxifolin), taxifolin, succinate, CO_{2}, and H_{2}O.

=== Derivatives ===
The enzyme taxifolin 8-monooxygenase uses taxifolin, NADH, NADPH, H^{+}, and O_{2} to produce 2,3-dihydrogossypetin, NAD^{+}, NADP^{+}, and H_{2}O.

==== Glycosides ====
Astilbin is the 3-O-rhamnoside of taxifolin. Taxifolin deoxyhexose can be found in açai fruits.

Taxifolin 3-O-glucoside isomers have been separated from Chamaecyparis obtusa.

(-)-2,3-trans-Dihydroquercetin-3'-O-β-D-glucopyranoside, a taxifolin glucoside has been extracted from the inner bark of Pinus densiflora and can act as an oviposition stimulant in the cerambycid beetle Monochamus alternatus.

(2S,3S)-(-)-Taxifolin-3-O-β-D-glucopyranoside has been isolated from the root-sprouts of Agrimonia pilosa.

(2R,3R)-Taxifolin-3'-O-β-D-pyranoglucoside has been isolated from the rhizome of Smilax glabra.

Minor amount of taxifolin 4′-O-β-glucopyranoiside can be found in red onions.

(2R,3R)-Taxifolin 3-O-arabinoside and (2S,3S)-taxifolin 3-O-arabinoside have been isolated from the leaves of Trachelospermum jasminoides (star jasmine).

== Derived natural compounds ==
- Dihydroquercetin-3-O-rhamnoside (Astilbin)
- (+)-Leucocyanidin can be synthesized from taxifolin by sodium borohydride reduction.
